= K-116 (Kansas highway) =

State highway in Kansas, U.S.

K-116
- K-116 highlighted in red

Route information
- Maintained by KDOT
- Length: 26.146 mi (42.078 km)
- Existed: January 7, 1937–present

Major junctions
- West end: US-75 / K-16 in Holton
- US-159 north of Nortonville
- East end: US-59 southwest of Atchison

Location
- Country: United States
- State: Kansas
- Counties: Jackson, Atchison

Highway system
- Kansas State Highway System; Interstate; US; State; Spurs
← K-115	→ K-117

K-116 is a 26.146-mile-long (42.078 km) state highway in the northeast part of the U.S. state of Kansas. K-116's western terminus is at U.S. Route 75 (US-75) and K-16 in Holton, and the eastern terminus is at US-59 southwest of Atchison. The first 3.5 miles (5.6 km) of K-116 is co-designated with K-16. Also a brief section is co-designated with US-159 near the eastern terminus. The highway travels mostly through rural farmland and is a two-lane highway for its entire length.

Before state highways were numbered in Kansas there were an informal network of marked routes known as auto trails in the early 20th century. The section between US-159 and the eastern terminus was part of the former Southwest Trail. K-116 was assigned on January 7, 1937, by the Kansas State Highway Commission, now known as the Kansas Department of Transportation. A year later, K-16 was realigned to run directly north to K-116, then run west along K-116 into Holton. In 1958, K-116 was extended east to a new alignment of US-59 and K-4 that was constructed between Nortonville and Cummings.

== Route description ==
K-116's western terminus is at an intersection with US-75 and K-16 in Holton. The highway begins traveling concurrent with K-16 eastward along 4th Street. As the highway exits the city it crosses over Banner Creek. The roadway continues through farmland with scattered houses to an intersection with T Road. At this point K-16 turns south towards Birmingham, as K-116 continues east. The highway crosses Bills Creek before intersecting West Road, which heads south to Denison. K-116 continues eastward and enters Larkinburg at the Jackson–Atchison county line.

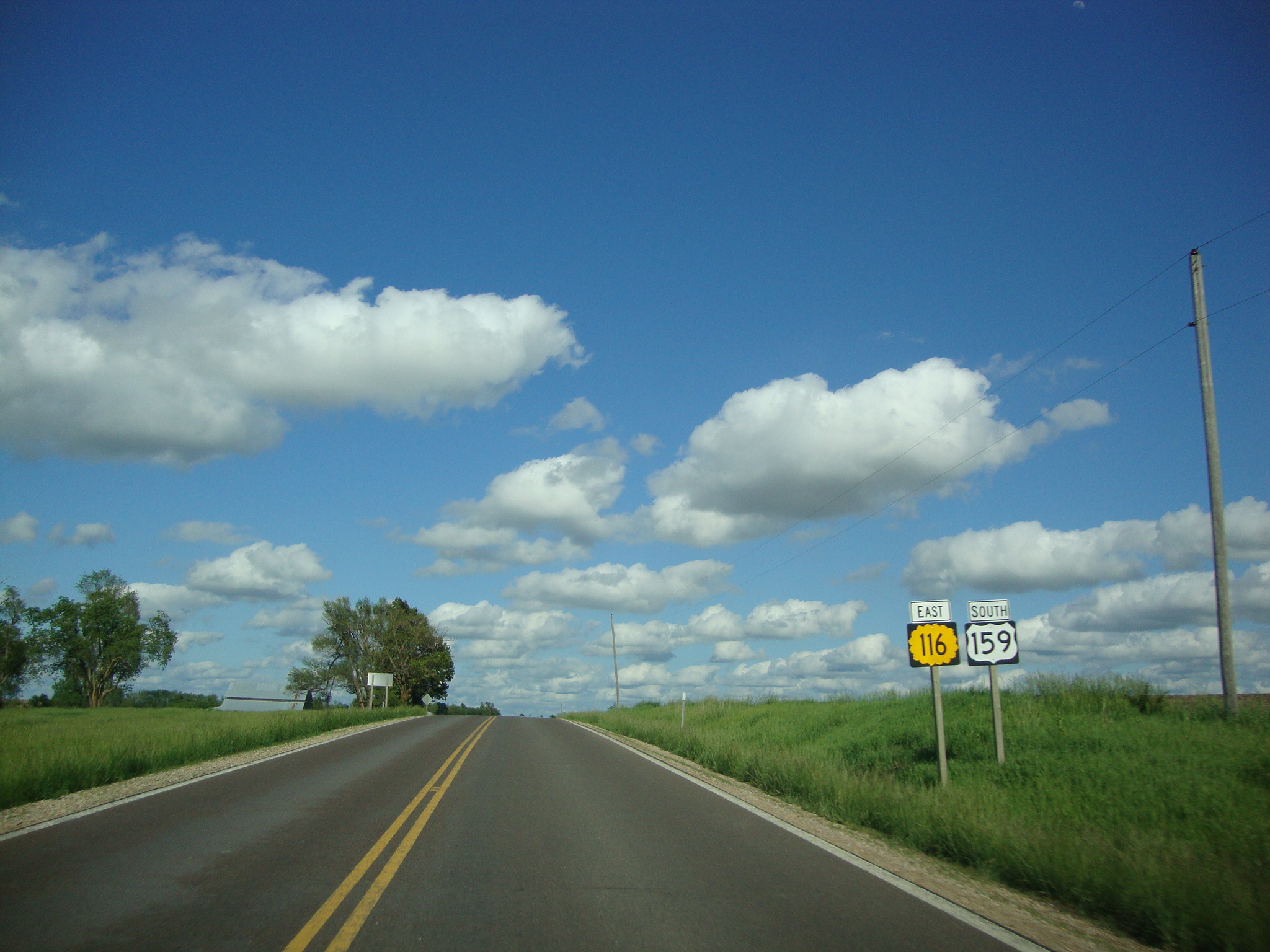
K-116 eastbound with US-159 north of Nortonville

As K-116 enters the county it crosses over Elk Creek, then shifts slightly to the south. K-116 crosses over the Delaware River then passes to the south of Arrington, before shifting back north. The highway continues east and soon intersects Bourbon Road, which runs north to Muscotah. The roadway proceeds to a crossing over Coal Creek, before entering Edwards Road, which goes north to Effingham. K-116 continues east and soon crosses over Little Stranger Creek, then reaches a junction with US-159, which it begins to overlap. The two routes continue east for roughly 0.7 miles (1.1 km), then US-159 turns south towards Nortonville, as K-116 continues east. K-116 proceeds through farmland, before reaching its eastern terminus at US-59 southwest of Atchison and west of Cummings.

The Kansas Department of Transportation (KDOT) tracks the traffic volumes on its highways. On K-116 in 2019, they determined that the annual average daily traffic ranged from 610 vehicles west of the overlap with US-159 to 2,110 vehicles east of Holton.

== History ==
Before state highways were numbered in Kansas there were auto trails. The section of K-116 between US-159 and the eastern terminus was part of the former Southwest Trail, which ran from Fort Worth north to Chicago. The western terminus connects to the former Omaha-Topeka Trail, Capitol Route which traveled from Austin north to Omaha, and Corn Belt Route which went from south of Marysville east to Bonner Springs.

K-116 was assigned by the Kansas Department of Transportation (KDOT), at the time State Highway Commission of Kansas (SHC), in a resolution approved on January 7, 1937. At that time it ran from its current western terminus to the western end of the overlap with US-159. In a separate resolution passed the same day, it was approved to realign K-16 to run directly north to K-116, then run west along K-116 into Holton. K-16 originally only overlapped K-116 from the western terminus to about Michigan Avenue in Holton. It then turned south and ran through what is now a commercial building and then followed 222 Road to the modern alignment of K-16, where it turned south. This realignment of K-16 was completed by January 1938. In late May 1941, the SHC asked for bids for new culverts, two new bridges and grading on K-116 in Jackson and Atchison counties. In early July 1941, the SHC accepted a bid for $54,589 (equivalent to $1.19 million in 2025) for the project.

It was approved in a resolution on August 7, 1941, to realign K-116 slightly near the crossing of Bills Creek to eliminate six sharp curves that were "deemed dangerous" by the SHC. It was approved in a resolution on July 10, 1957, to realign US-59 and K-4 between Nortonville and Cummings. Up to this point, K-116 had ended at the current west end of the overlap with US-159. The new alignment of US-59 and K-4 opened to traffic on August 30, 1958, at which time K-116 was extended east along US-159 and the former US-59 and K-4 to the new alignment. US-159 also was extended south along the former US-59 and K-4 to the new alignment. On December 1, 1994, K-4's eastern terminus was truncated to US-59 in Nortonville, which left K-116's eastern terminus solely, US-59.

== Major intersections ==
County	Location	mi	km	Destinations	Notes
Jackson	Holton	0.000	0.000	K-16 west (4th Street) to K-63	Continuation past US-75; western end of K-16 concurrency
Jackson	Holton	0.000	0.000	US-75 (Arizona Avenue) to US-36 – Topeka, Sabetha	Western terminus
Jackson	Franklin–Garfield township line	3.506	5.642	K-16 east (T Road) – Valley Falls	Eastern end of K-16 concurrency
Atchison	Center Township	21.659	34.857	US-159 north – Horton	Western end of US-159 concurrency
Atchison	Center Township	22.309	35.903	US-159 south – Oskaloosa	Eastern end of US-159 concurrency
Atchison	Center Township	26.146	42.078	US-59 – Atchison, Nortonville	Eastern terminus
1.000 mi = 1.609 km; 1.000 km = 0.621 mi: Concurrency terminus
