= Banner Township, Jackson County, Kansas =

Banner Township
- Township
- Location in Jackson County
- Coordinates: 39°26′00″N 95°50′56″W
- Country: United States
- State: Kansas
- County: Jackson

Area
  - Total: 36.02 sq mi (93.28 km^{2})
  - Land: 35.76 sq mi (92.62 km^{2})
  - Water: 0.25 sq mi (0.65 km^{2}) 0.7%
- Elevation: 1,296 ft (395 m)

Population (2020)
  - Total: 327
  - Density: 9.14/sq mi (3.53/km^{2})
- GNIS feature ID: 0478185

Banner Township is a township in Jackson County, Kansas, United States. As of the 2020 census, its population was 327. The southernmost part of the township is located within the Prairie Band Potawatomi Indian Reservation.

== Geography ==
Banner Township covers an area of 36.02 square miles (93.28 square kilometers); of this, 0.25 square miles (0.65 square kilometers) or 0.7 percent is water.

=== Adjacent townships ===
- Jefferson Township (north)
- Liberty Township (northeast)
- Franklin Township (east)
- Lincoln Township (south)
- Grant Township (west)
- Soldier Township (northwest)

=== Cemeterys ===
The township contains one cemetery, Hass.

=== Major highways ===
- K-16
