= Cedar Township, Jackson County, Kansas =

Cedar Township
- Township
- Location in Jackson County
- Coordinates: 39°21′20″N 95°39′51″W
- Country: United States
- State: Kansas
- County: Jackson

Area
  - Total: 39.94 sq mi (103.44 km^{2})
  - Land: 39.93 sq mi (103.41 km^{2})
  - Water: 0.015 sq mi (0.04 km^{2}) 0.04%
- Elevation: 1,102 ft (336 m)

Population (2020)
  - Total: 1,392
  - Density: 34.86/sq mi (13.46/km^{2})
- GNIS feature ID: 0478197

Cedar Township is a township in Jackson County, Kansas, United States. As of the 2020 census, its population was 1,392.

== History ==
The first permanent white settlement in Cedar Township was in 1855.

== Geography ==
Cedar Township covers an area of 39.94 square miles (103.44 square kilometers); of this, 0.01 square miles (0.04 square kilometers) or 0.04 percent is water. The stream of Morgan Creek runs through this township.

=== Communities ===
- Denison (southwestern edge)
- Mayetta

=== Adjacent townships ===
- Garfield Township (northeast)
- Delaware Township, Jefferson County (east)
- Douglas Township (south)
- Lincoln Township (west)
- Franklin Township (northwest)

=== Cemeteries ===
The township contains three cemeteries: Cedar Grove, South Cedar and South Denison.

=== Major highways ===
- U.S. Route 75
- K-16
