= Garfield Township, Jackson County, Kansas =

Garfield Township
- Township
- Location in Jackson County
- Coordinates: 39°26′00″N 95°37′36″W
- Country: United States
- State: Kansas
- County: Jackson

Area
  - Total: 34.00 sq mi (88.06 km^{2})
  - Land: 33.83 sq mi (87.62 km^{2})
  - Water: 0.17 sq mi (0.43 km^{2}) 0.49%
- Elevation: 1,112 ft (339 m)

Population (2020)
  - Total: 564
  - Density: 16.7/sq mi (6.44/km^{2})
- GNIS feature ID: 0478198

Garfield Township is a township in Jackson County, Kansas, United States. As of the 2020 census, its population was 564.

== Geography ==
Garfield Township covers an area of 34 square miles (88.06 square kilometers); of this, 0.17 square miles (0.43 square kilometers) or 0.49 percent is water. The stream of Bills Creek runs through this township.

=== Communities ===
- Denison (vast majority)
- Carbon (historical)

(This list is based on USGS data and may include former settlements.)

=== Adjacent townships ===
- Straight Creek Township (north)
- Kapioma Township, Atchison County (east)
- Delaware Township, Jefferson County (southeast)
- Cedar Township (south)
- Franklin Township (west)
- Liberty Township (northwest)

=== Major highways ===
- K-16
- K-116
