= Franklin Township, Jackson County, Kansas =

Franklin Township
- Township
- Location in Jackson County
- Coordinates: 39°26′00″N 95°44′21″W
- Country: United States
- State: Kansas
- County: Jackson

Area
  - Total: 33.42 sq mi (86.57 km^{2})
  - Land: 32.33 sq mi (83.73 km^{2})
  - Water: 1.10 sq mi (2.84 km^{2}) 3.28%
- Elevation: 1,125 ft (343 m)

Population (2020)
  - Total: 903
  - Density: 27.9/sq mi (10.8/km^{2})
- GNIS feature ID: 0478189

Franklin Township is a township in Jackson County, Kansas, United States. As of the 2020 census, its population was 903. The southwesternmost part of the township is located within the Prairie Band Potawatomi Indian Reservation.

== History ==
Franklin Township was formed in 1856. It was named for Ben Franklin.

== Geography ==
Franklin Township covers an area of 33.43 square miles (86.57 square kilometers); of this, 1.1 square miles (2.84 square kilometers) or 3.28 percent is water. The stream of Banner Creek runs through this township.

=== Communities ===
- Birmingham

(This list is based on USGS data and may include former settlements.)

=== Adjacent townships ===
- Liberty Township (north)
- Straight Creek Township (northeast)
- Garfield Township (east)
- Cedar Township (southeast)
- Lincoln Township (southwest)
- Banner Township (west)
- Jefferson Township (northwest)

=== Cemeteries ===
The township contains two cemeteries: Bruck and Holton.

=== Major highways ===
- U.S. Route 75
- K-16
- K-116
