= KS 4 =

KS 4 or KS4 or KS-4 may refer to:

- Key Stage 4, of British secondary education
- Kansas's 4th congressional district, United States House of Representatives
- K-4 (Kansas highway), American road
