= Oakland Expressway Bridge =

- Coordinates: 39.0808°N 95.6137°W
- Carries: K-4 (Oakland Expressway)
- Crosses: Kansas River
- Locale: Topeka, Kansas
- Maintained by: KDOT

Characteristics
- Design: Girder

The Oakland Expressway Bridge (sometimes called the East Topeka Interchange) is an automobile crossing of the Kansas River at Topeka, Kansas. It is open to traffic, and also carries K-4 as well. The bridge used drilled shaft construction technology when built in 1996.
