= Grant Township, Jackson County, Kansas =

Grant Township
- Township
- Location in Jackson County
- Coordinates: 39°26′30″N 95°57′31″W
- Country: United States
- State: Kansas
- County: Jackson

Area
  - Total: 42.00 sq mi (108.77 km^{2})
  - Land: 41.95 sq mi (108.66 km^{2})
  - Water: 0.042 sq mi (0.11 km^{2}) 0.1%
- Elevation: 1,184 ft (361 m)

Population (2020)
  - Total: 186
  - Density: 4.43/sq mi (1.71/km^{2})
- GNIS feature ID: 1729694

Grant Township is a township in Jackson County, Kansas, United States. As of the 2020 census, its population was 186. The southeasternmost part of the township is located within the Prairie Band Potawatomi Indian Reservation.

== History ==
Grant Township was formed in 1870.

== Geography ==
Grant Township covers an area of 42 square miles (108.77 square kilometers); of this, 0.04 square miles (0.11 square kilometers) or 0.1 percent is water.

=== Adjacent townships ===
- Soldier Township (north)
- Jefferson Township (northeast)
- Banner Township (east)
- Lincoln Township (southeast)
- Adrian Township (south)
- St. Clere Township, Pottawatomie County (southwest)
- Lincoln Township, Pottawatomie County (west)
- Grant Township, Pottawatomie County (northwest)

=== Cemeteries ===
The township contains two cemeteries: Boan and Olive Hill.

=== Major highways ===
- K-16
