= U.S. Route 59 in Kansas =

Segment of American highway

U.S. Highway 59
- US-59 highlighted in red

Route information
- Maintained by KDOT and the cities of Parsons, Lawrence and Atchison
- Length: 210.440 mi (338.670 km)

Major junctions
- South end: US 59 / SH-2 near Chetopa
- US-160 in Oswego; US-54 in Moran; I-35 / US-50 in Ottawa; US-56 four miles west of Baldwin City; US-40 in Lawrence; I-70 / Kansas Turnpike in Lawrence; US-24 / US-40 in Lawrence; US-24 in Williamstown; US-159 / K-4 Alt. in Nortonville; US-73 / K-7 in Atchison
- North end: US 59 at Atchison

Location
- Country: United States
- State: Kansas
- Counties: Labette, Neosho, Allen, Anderson, Franklin, Douglas, Jefferson, Atchison

Highway system
- United States Numbered Highway System; List; Special; Divided; Kansas State Highway System; Interstate; US; State; Spurs
← K-59	→ K-60
← K-5	K-6	→ K-7

U.S. Route 59 (US-59) is a part of the U.S. Highway System that runs from the Mexico–US border in Laredo, Texas, as a continuation of Mexican Federal Highway 85D north to the Lancaster–Tolstoi Border Crossing on the Canada–US border, where it continues as Manitoba Highway 59. In the U.S. state of Kansas, US-59 is a main north–south highway that travels from Chetopa to Atchison.

== Route description ==
US-59 is a 210-mile-long (340 km) highway which runs from south to north in eastern Kansas. It enters the state from Oklahoma south of Chetopa and passes through Parsons, Ottawa, Oswego, Moran, Garnett, and Lawrence. The route leaves Kansas for Missouri by crossing the Missouri River at Atchison. Most of the route climbs the cuestas of the Osage prairie, while north of the Kansas River, it cuts through the glaciated region.

Almost the entire length of US-59 in Kansas is maintained by the Kansas Department of Transportation (KDOT). The 4.469 miles (7.192 km) section within Parsons is maintained by the city. The section within Lawrence is maintained by the city. The 2.613 miles (4.205 km) section of US-59 within Atchison is maintained by the city. KDOT surveys the roads under its control on a regular basis to measure the amount of traffic using the state's highways. These traffic counts are expressed in terms of annual average daily traffic (AADT), a calculation of the average daily number of vehicles on a segment of roadway. For the 2012 survey, the stretch of road with the highest AADT was 8,249 vehicles per day south of the Lawrence city limits. The lowest was 380 vehicles per day at the Neosho–Allen county line. The statistic was not measured within large cities.

=== Southeastern Kansas ===
US-59 enters Kansas south of Chetopa along a two-lane highway. As it enters the town, it becomes known as 3rd Street. It intersects US-166, which runs along Maple Street. US-59 turns west along Maple and the two routes run together for 1.5 miles (2.4 km). After curving to the north and reaching the northern city limits, US 166 splits off to the west and US-59 continues north. Eight miles (13 km) to the north, it enters Oswego along Commerce Street where it crosses a line of the South Kansas & Oklahoma Railroad (SKOL). Near the Labette County courthouse, it meets 6th Street, which carries US-160. These two routes head west together and then to the northwest parallel to a single Union Pacific Railroad (UP) track. Northwest of Oswego, the two routes follow a curve to north and then to the west, which allows a safe crossing of the UP line. Just before reaching Altamont, US-59 splits off to the north leaving US-160 to continue west.

=== Eastern Kansas ===
After its intersection with US-54, US-59 continues north toward Mildred. In and around Mildred, the highway curves to once again parallel the UP railroad. The route enters Anderson County just north of Mildred and curves to the north. North of here, the route turns west and begins a concurrency with K-31. The highways continue west then bend to the north to bypass the city of Lone Elm. After trekking north, the routes warp to the west and intersect US-169. The three routes run concurrent until just south of Garnett, where US-169 splits off to the northeast at a roundabout. US-169 has a business route that begins at this roundabout and follows US-59 and K-31 north until 6th Street. Here, Bus. US-169 splits off to the east, while US-59 and K-31 continue north. The concurrency with K-31 ends in northern Garnett, as K-31 forks to the west at Park Street and US-59 continues north and leaves the city.

North of Garnett, US-59 bypasses a few small lakes by curving slightly to the west, then continues north and enters Franklin County. Immediately north of the county line is the small community of Richmond, which US-59 runs through the western portion of. A few miles north of here, a couple of curves take the highway northwest, and it heads north to the city of Princeton. The route continues north, through Princeton, and enters Ottawa near an interchange with Interstate 35 (I-35) and US-50. At this interchange, US-59 becomes concurrent with the two routes and becomes a freeway. The highways run east momentarily, then curve to the north and intersect K-68 and a business route of US-50. North of this interchange, the routes curve to the east, and US-59 leaves I-35 and US-50 at a trumpet interchange.

=== Northeastern Kansas ===
==== Ottawa to Lawrence ====
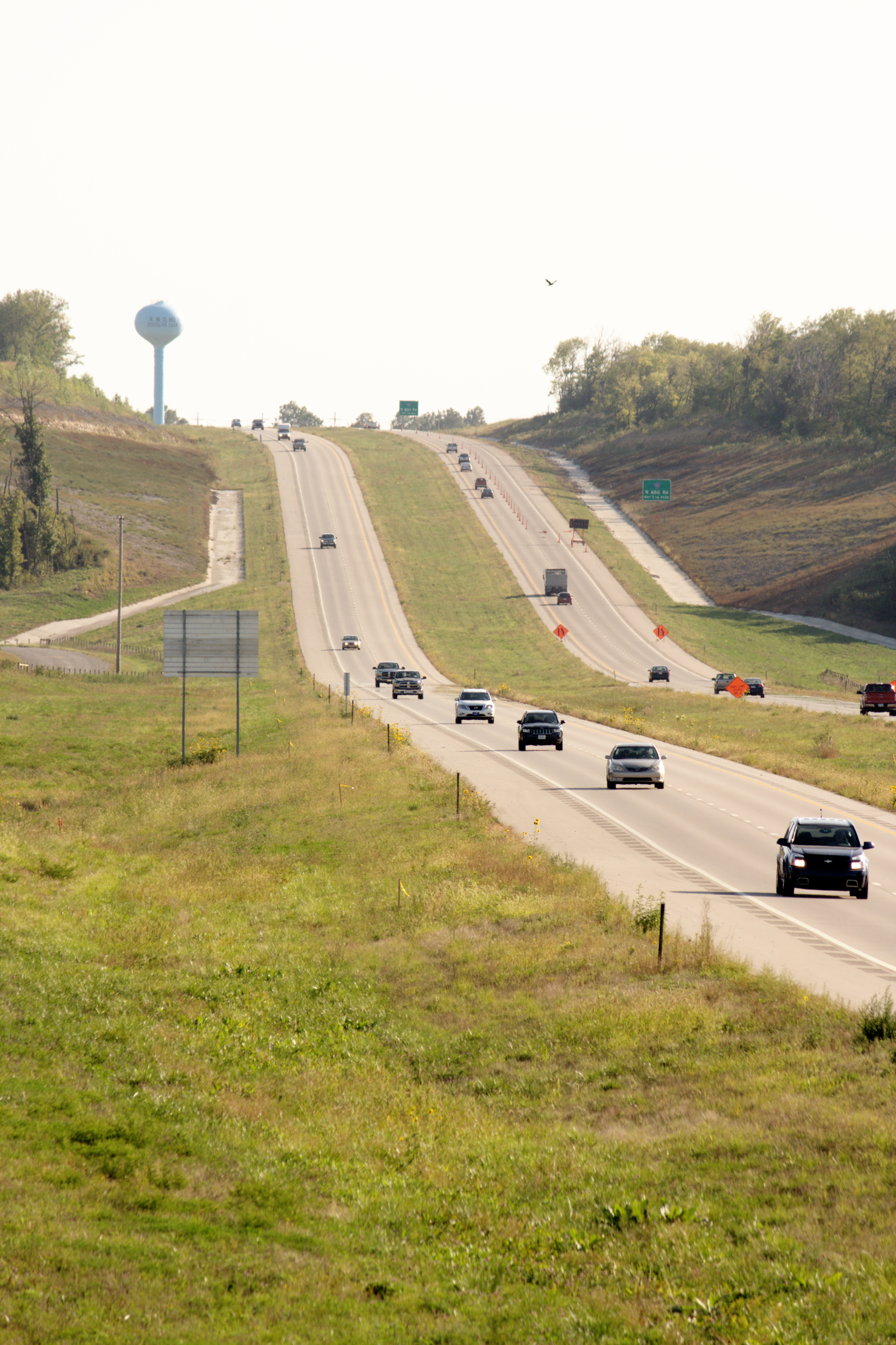
The newly upgraded U.S. Route 59 freeway between Ottawa, Kansas and Lawrence, Kansas

After leaving I-35/US-50, US-59 heads north as a controlled-access freeway. Previously, US-59 had run through Ottawa to Lawrence as a two-lane road. Due to high accident rates, this stretch of US-59 was converted into a divided highway, with the project reaching completion in 2012. The old road was turned over to Franklin and Douglas counties, with the Douglas County portion being re-designated as Douglas County highway 1045.

The US-59 freeway passes through rural Franklin County and crosses into Douglas County. Three miles north of the county line, it has an interchange with US-56, roughly four miles west of Baldwin City. It bypasses the unincorporated community of Pleasant Grove (the former alignment passed through the settlement). South of Lawrence, Douglas County highway 458 becomes concurrent with US-59 for a two-mile stretch. Following this interchange, the freeway downgrades to an expressway with at-grade intersections, and the speed limit drops from 70 to 55 mph. After CR-458 leaves US-59 at an at-grade intersection, US-59 reaches the south side of Lawrence and crosses K-10, known as the South Lawrence Trafficway, which heads west as a Super-2 toward Clinton Lake, the Kansas Turnpike, and Lecompton; and east as a divided freeway toward Olathe and Lenexa. Prior to November 2016, K-10 was merged with US-59 between the South Lawrence Trafficway and 23rd Street due to lawsuits over the completion of the road.

In Lawrence, US-59 runs along Iowa Street, home to many retail shopping centers and fast-food restaurants. North of 23rd Street/Clinton Parkway, US-59 runs along the western edge of the University of Kansas. After crossing 9th Street, travelers seeking access to the Kansas Turnpike can exit US-59 onto MacDonald Drive, while US-59 becomes concurrent with US-40 at 6th Street.

US-40/US-59 runs east along 6th Street until approaching Downtown Lawrence. At this point, the highway turns north and crosses the Kansas River into the district of North Lawrence, where the road forms parts of North 2nd Street and North 3rd Street. US-40/US-59 has an interchange with the Kansas Turnpike, signed as Interstate 70, at the Turnpike's East Lawrence plaza. After this, US-40/US-59 exits the Lawrence city limits.

==== Lawrence to Atchison ====
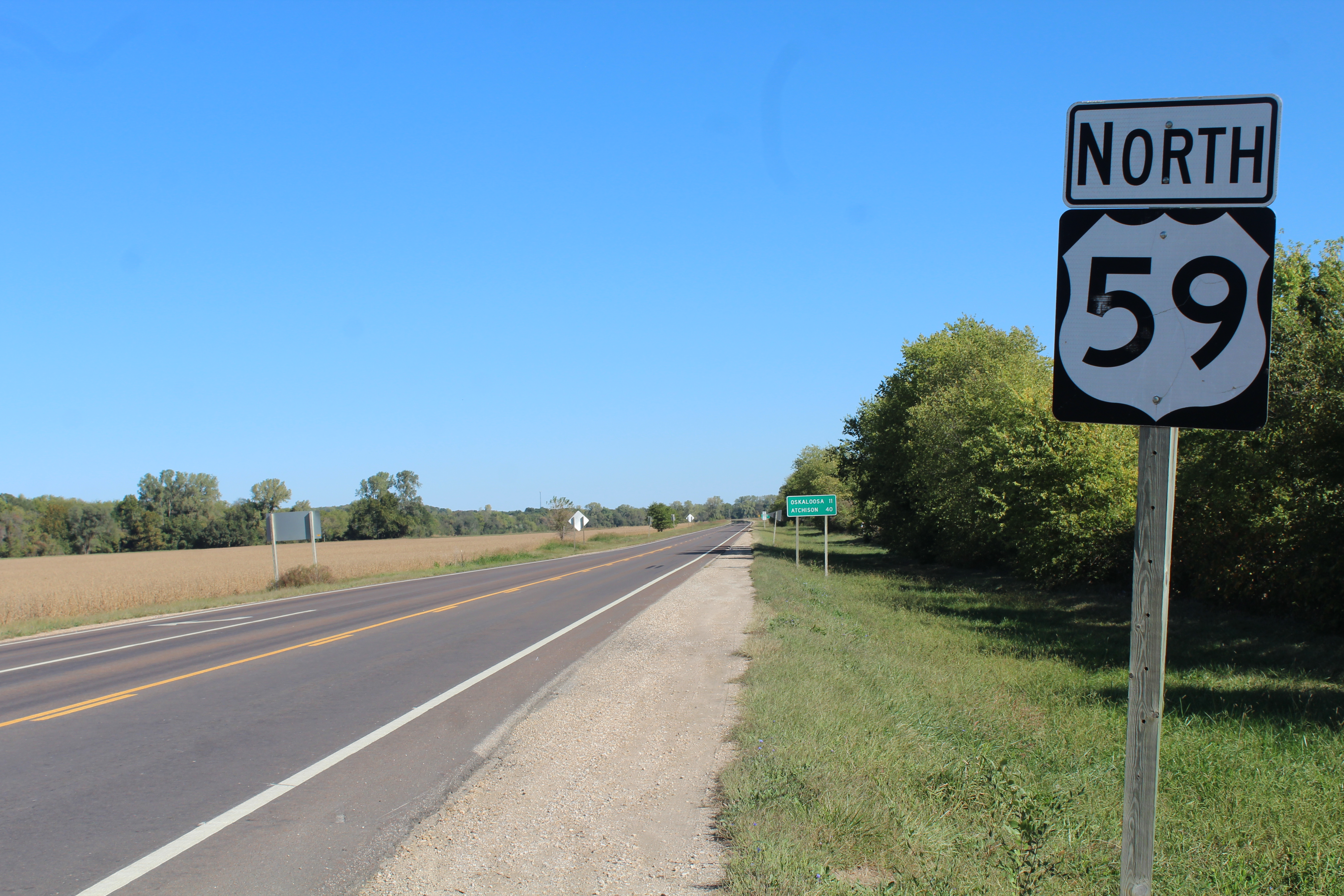
US 59 after concurring with US 24 north of Williamstown

After leaving Lawrence, US-40/US-59 meets US-24 at an intersection known locally as "Teepee Junction". US-40 joins with US-24 EB en route to Tonganoxie, while US-59 joins with US-24 WB en route to Oskaloosa and Topeka. US-24/US-59 runs northwest parallel to the Union Pacific Railroad as it crosses the Douglas/Jefferson county line. Then the road turns sharply north and then due west, passing a local cemetery, before approaching the unincorporated community of Williamstown. At this point, the two highways split off, with US-24 continuing west toward Perry and Topeka, while US-59 heads north toward Oskaloosa. Previously, this intersection also included K-76, a very short route which ran into Williamstown itself. K-76 was decommissioned in 2013, and all signage and reference to it has been removed.

From Williamstown, US-59 continues north as a two lane highway. This stretch of US-59 is part of "The Iron Men Of Metz Highway", a designation running from Topeka to Leavenworth and including the segment of US-59 between Williamstown and its junction with K-16/K-92 just outside of Oskaloosa. At this junction, K-16 and K-92 both become concurrent with US-59. The road enters Oskaloosa, and K-92 leaves the concurrency to head west toward Perry Lake. US-59/K-16 continues north until it meets a junction with K-192 west of Winchester, at which point K-16 leaves the road and heads west toward Valley Falls. From here US-59 continues north until reaching Nortonville. It forms the eastern terminus of K-4, then almost immediately has a junction with child route US-159, which heads north to Effingham. After this, US-59 crosses into Atchison County and takes a more northeasterly route as it crosses the county. Much of this stretch runs parallel to the BNSF Railroad. US-59 enters Atchison and becomes part of a wrong-way concurrency with US-73 as it runs through the western portion of town. This concurrency ends at a junction with K-7, as US-73 leaves US-59 to become concurrent with K-7 and run south to Leavenworth. US-59 continues east on its own through the rest of town and crosses the Amelia Earhart Memorial Bridge into Winthrop, Missouri, en route to St. Joseph.

== Major intersections ==
All exits are unnumbered.

County	Location	mi	km	Destinations	Notes
Labette	Richland Township	0.000	0.000	US 59 south – Vinita	Continuation into Oklahoma
Labette	Chetopa	2.579	4.150	US-166 east (Maple Street)	Southern end of US-166 concurrency
Labette	Chetopa	4.073	6.555	US-166 west	Northern end of US-166 concurrency
Labette	Oswego	12.193	19.623	US-160 east (6th Street)	Southern end of US-160 concurrency
Labette	Fairview–Mount Pleasant township line	22.051	35.488	US-160 west	Northern end of US-160 concurrency
Labette	Parsons	34.145	54.951	US-400 to US-69 – Fredonia	Diamond interchange
Neosho	Centerville Township	44.658	71.870	K-47 east	Southern end of K-47 concurrency
Neosho	Centerville Township	45.580	73.354	K-47 west	Northern end of K-47 concurrency
Neosho	Erie Township	50.842	81.822	K-146 east	Western terminus of K-146
Neosho	Big Creek Township	56.351	90.688	K-39 west	Southern end of K-39 concurrency
Neosho	Grant Township	61.525	99.015	K-201 east	Western terminus of K-201
Neosho	Grant Township	63.536	102.251	K-39 east	Northern end of K-39 concurrency
Allen	Moran	77.678	125.011	US-54	
Anderson	Rich Township	88.778	142.874	K-31 east	Southern end of K-31 concurrency
Anderson	Welda–Washington township line	100.915	162.407	US-169 south	Southern end of US-169 concurrency
Anderson	Washington Township	105.133	169.195	US-169 north / US 169 Bus. begins	Roundabout; northern end of US-169 concurrency; southern end of US-169 Bus. concurrency
Anderson	Garnett	106.554	171.482	US 169 Bus. (6th Avenue)	Northern end of US-169 Bus. concurrency
Anderson	Garnett	107.205	172.530	K-31 west	Northern end of K-31 concurrency
Franklin	Ottawa	127.449	205.109	I-35 south / US-50 west	Southern end of I-35 / US-50 concurrency; south end of freeway; diamond interchange; I-35 exit 183
Franklin	Harrison Township			15th Street	Diamond interchange; I-35 exit 185
Franklin	Ottawa			K-68 – Ottawa, Louisburg	Diamond interchange; I-35 exit 187
Franklin	Ottawa Township	133.025	214.083	I-35 north / US-50 east	Northern end of I-35 / US-50 concurrency; I-35 exit 188; trumpet interchange
Franklin	Ottawa Township			Montana Road	
Franklin	Hayes Township			Eisenhower Terrace (Old US 59)	Northbound entrance and southbound exit only
Franklin	Hayes Township			Stafford Road	
Douglas	Willow Springs Township	143.869	231.535	US-56 – Olathe, Council Grove	Supplemental signage indicates that US-56 also serves Baldwin City and Burlingame; diamond interchange
Douglas	Willow Springs Township	147.369	237.167	CR 460 (N. 650 Road)	
Douglas	Wakarusa Township	151.033	243.064	CR 458 east (N. 1000 Road)	Southern end of CR-458 concurrency; north end of freeway
Douglas	Wakarusa Township	152.702	245.750	CR 458 west (N. 1200 Road)	Northern end of CR-458 concurrency
Douglas	Wakarusa Township			K-10 (South Lawrence Trafficway) – Lecompton, Olathe	Formerly to westbound K-10 only; eastern portion of S. Lawrence Trafficway opened November 8, 2016
Douglas	Lawrence	157.130	252.876	US-40 west (W. 6th Street) – Topeka To I-70 / Kansas Turnpike / McDonald Drive north	Interchange with McDonald Dr., at-grade intersection with US-40; southern end of US-40 concurrency
Douglas	Lawrence	158.449	254.999	U.S. 40 and 59 Bridges over the Kansas River	
Douglas	Lawrence	159.738	257.073	I-70 / Kansas Turnpike – Topeka, Kansas City	I-70 exit 204
Douglas	Grant Township	160.368	258.087	US-24 east / US-40 east (N. 1800 Road)	Northern end of US-40 concurrency; southern end of US-24 concurrency
Jefferson	Williamstown	168.719	271.527	US-24 west – Perry, Topeka	Northern end of US-24 concurrency
Jefferson	Oskaloosa Township	178.850	287.831	K-16 east / K-92 east	Southern end of K-16 / K-92 concurrency
Jefferson	Oskaloosa	179.810	289.376	K-92 west (Jefferson Street)	Northern end of K-92 concurrency
Jefferson	Jefferson Township	187.916	302.421	K-16 west / K-192 east	Northern end of K-16 concurrency
Jefferson	Nortonville	193.589	311.551	K-4 west	Eastern terminus of K-4
Jefferson	Nortonville	193.888	312.032	US-159 north / K-4 Alt. west – Nortonville, Hiawatha	Southern terminus of US-159; eastern terminus of K-4 Alt.
Atchison	Center Township	198.928	320.144	K-116 west – Holton	Eastern terminus of K-116
Atchison	Shannon Township	208.247	335.141	US-73 north to K-7 north – Hiawatha	Southern end of US-73 concurrency; to K-7 north only signed northbound
Atchison	Atchison	209.660	337.415	US-73 south / K-7 (10th Street) – Troy, Leavenworth	Northern end of US-73 concurrency
Missouri River		210.440	338.670	Amelia Earhart Bridge; Kansas–Missouri state line	
Missouri River		210.440	338.670	US 59 north – St. Joseph	Continuation into Missouri
1.000 mi = 1.609 km; 1.000 km = 0.621 mi: Concurrency terminus; Incomplete access; Tolled

U.S. Route 59
Previous state: Oklahoma	Kansas	Next state: Missouri
