= Lincoln Township, Jackson County, Kansas =

Lincoln Township
- Township
- Location within Jackson County

- Location within the state of Kansas
- Coordinates: 39°20′25″N 95°51′31″W
- Country: United States
- State: Kansas
- County: Jackson

Area
  - Total: 98.35 sq mi (254.73 km^{2})
  - Land: 98.31 sq mi (254.62 km^{2})
  - Water: 0.046 sq mi (0.12 km^{2}) 0.05%
- Elevation: 1,089 ft (332 m)

Population (2020)
  - Total: 1,313
  - Density: 13.36/sq mi (5.157/km^{2})
- GNIS ID: 478183

Lincoln Township is a township in Jackson County, Kansas, United States. As of the 2020 census, its population was 1,313. The township is located entirely within the Prairie Band Potawatomi Indian Reservation.

== Geography ==
Lincoln Township covers an area of 98.35 square miles (254.73 square kilometers); of this, 0.04 square miles (0.12 square kilometers) or 0.05 percent is water. Big Elm Creek, Crow Creek, Little Elm Creek, and South Branch Soldier Creek streams run through this township.

=== Adjacent townships ===
- Banner Township (north)
- Franklin Township (northeast)
- Cedar Township (east)
- Douglas Township (southeast)
- Washington Township (southwest)
- Adrian Township (west)
- Grant Township (northwest)

=== Cemeteries ===
The township contains three cemeteries: Danceground, Mitchell, and Shipsee.

=== Major highways ===
- U.S. Route 75
