= U.S. 40 and 59 Bridges =

Bridge that crosses the Kansas river in Lawrence Kansas

U.S. 40 and U.S. 59 Bridges
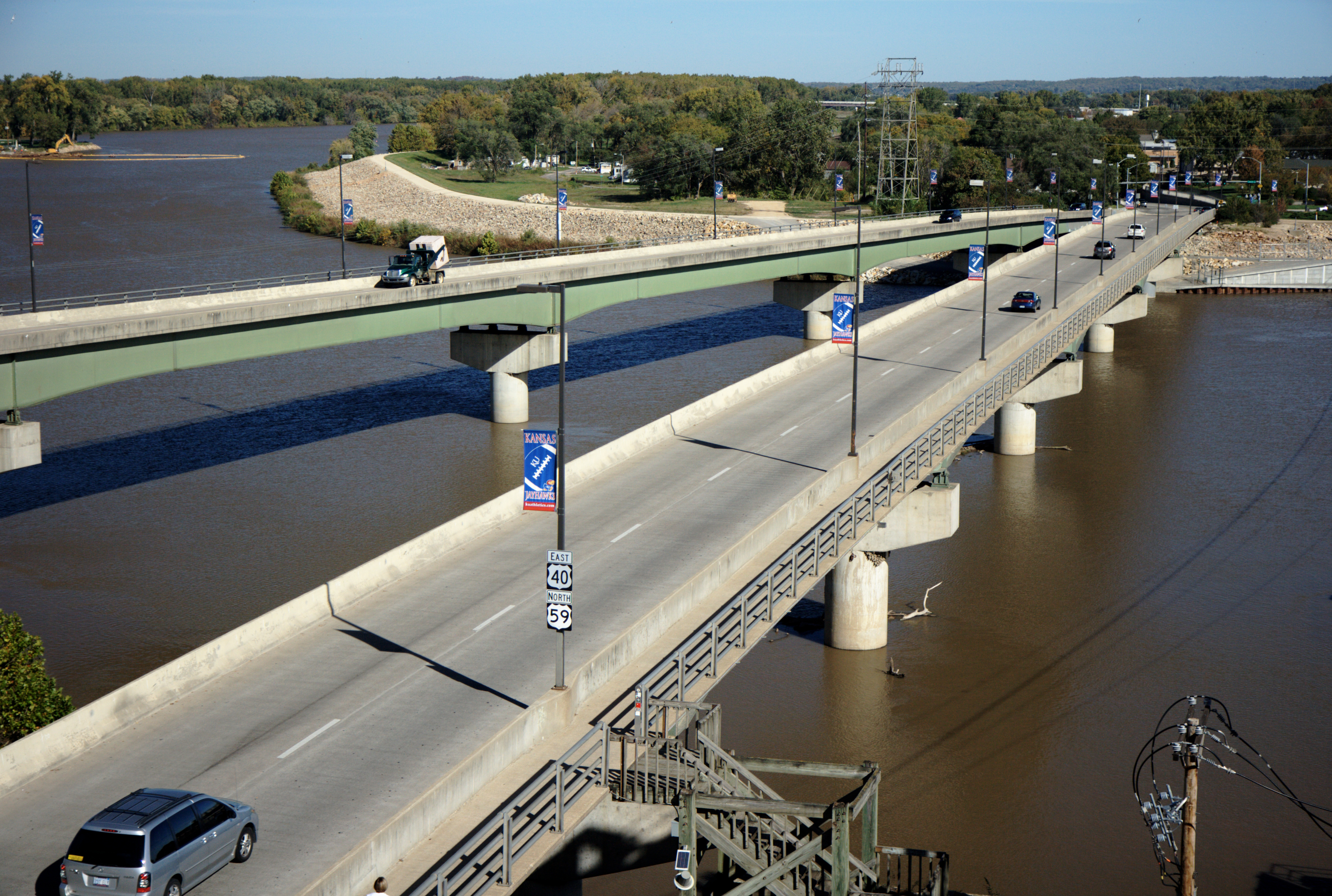
- The bridges as viewed from City Hall
- Coordinates: 38.9762°N 95.2357°W
- Carries: US-40 / US-59, Vermont Street, Massachusetts Street
- Crosses: Kansas River
- Locale: Lawrence, Kansas
- Maintained by: KDOT

Characteristics
- Design: Five-span Howe truss (original bridge); Concrete-deck arch (second bridge); Twin multi-beam girder bridges (current bridges)

History
- Opened: 1864 (original bridge); 1917 (second bridge); 1978 (current southbound bridge); 1980 (current northbound bridge)

Location
- Interactive map of U.S. 40 and U.S. 59 Bridges

The U.S. 40 and 59 Bridges are twin multi-beam girder bridges over the Kansas River at Lawrence, Kansas. The west bridge carries two lanes of southbound traffic, connecting to Vermont Street, while the east bridge carries two lanes of northbound traffic from Massachusetts Street. Both bridges converge on the north end to become North 2nd Street. The east bridge is also the third bridge to be built at this location.

== Original bridge ==
The first bridge was a 690-foot five-span Howe truss bridge built in 1864 by the Lawrence Bridge Company at a cost of $47,000. It was the first bridge across the Kansas River west of Kansas City. It was operated as a toll bridge until 1879, when the Kansas Supreme Court revoked the company's charter and seized the bridge on behalf of the state.

The first bridge was washed out by floods in 1876 and 1903 and rebuilt. By 1913, the bridge was determined to be unsafe, and was subsequently replaced with the second bridge.

== Second bridge ==
The second bridge, a 1,026 foot concrete arch bridge, was built by Douglas County and opened in January 1917. The bridge deck originally had a brick surface with a set of streetcar tracks down the center. The brick deck was later paved over.

By 1972, the bridge had begun to deteriorate due to years of road salt, and required patching of the south span across the Santa Fe Railway track. In addition, a water main had been placed on the west side of the bridge at rail height. The bridge was carrying 17,000 vehicles per day.

By 1973, Lawrence and Douglas County had agreed to hold a bond election for replacement of the Kansas River bridge. Initially proposed as a single four lane bridge at a cost of $3 million, plans were changed to a pair of two lane bridges, with the estimated costs increased to $5 million. Voters approved the bond issue to replace the Kansas River bridge in November 1974.

By January 1975, the spandrel beams on the deck had deteriorated to the point where an engineering consultant suggested that they may fail and cause a section of the bridge deck to drop. The consultant recommended that an eight-ton weight limit be imposed on the bridge, which was approved by the Lawrence City Commission over the opposition of truckers.

== Current bridges ==
Work began on the new Vermont Street bridge in April 1976. The winning contractor had bid $4.5 million, a figure that was considered "surprisingly low." Due to delays, the Vermont Street bridge was not completed and opened to traffic until April 4, 1978, at which time the old Massachusetts Street bridge was closed, and two-way traffic was temporally carried on the new bridge.

The old bridge was demolished manually, with some of the bridge material used as temporary fill as part of construction of the new bridge. Additional delays occurred on the new Massachusetts Street bridge; it was completed by January 1980, roughly a year and a half behind schedule. The bridge was not opened until March to allow the deck additional time to cure and not be exposed to winter salt treatments that could deteriorate the deck.

== Image gallery ==
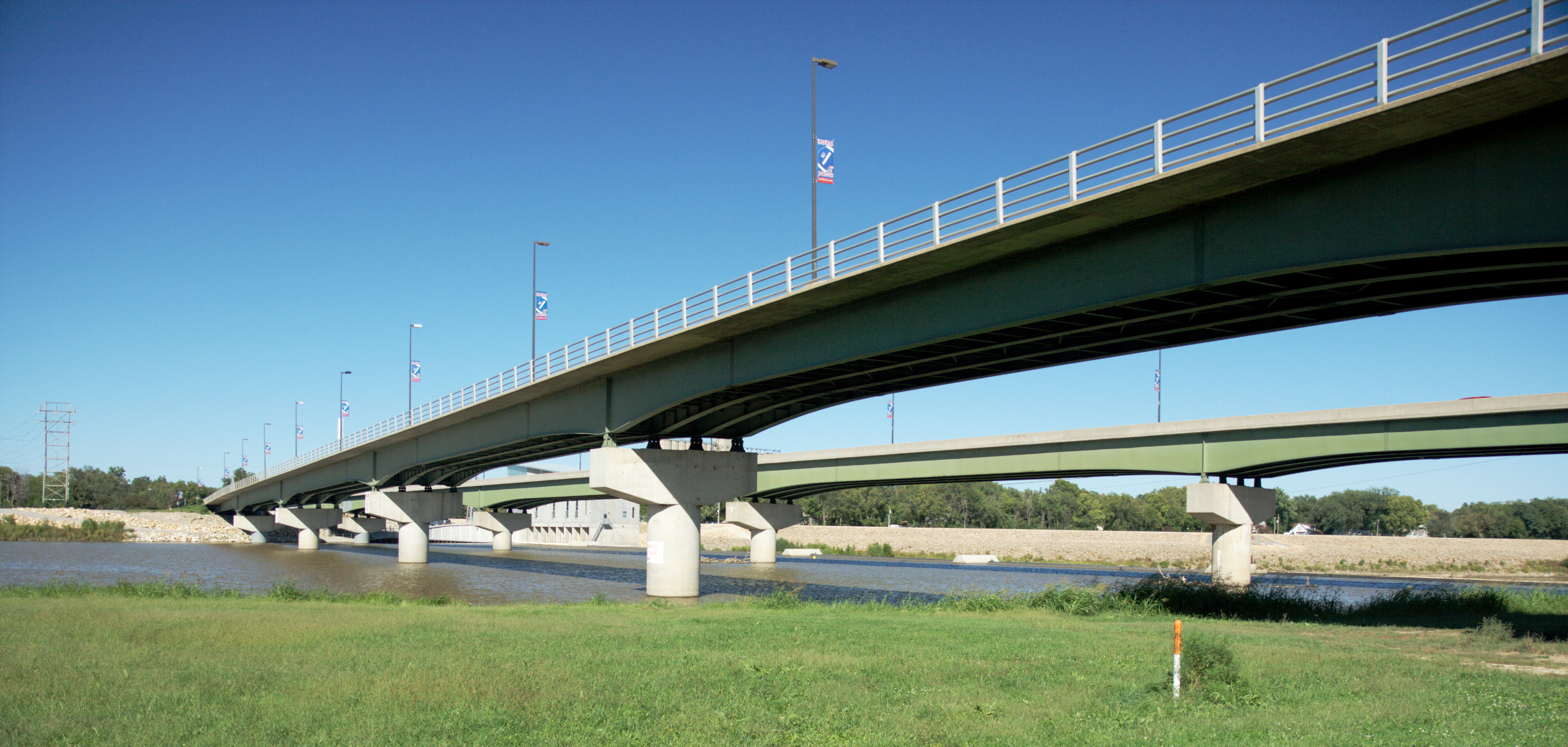
From the south bank, upstream of the bridges

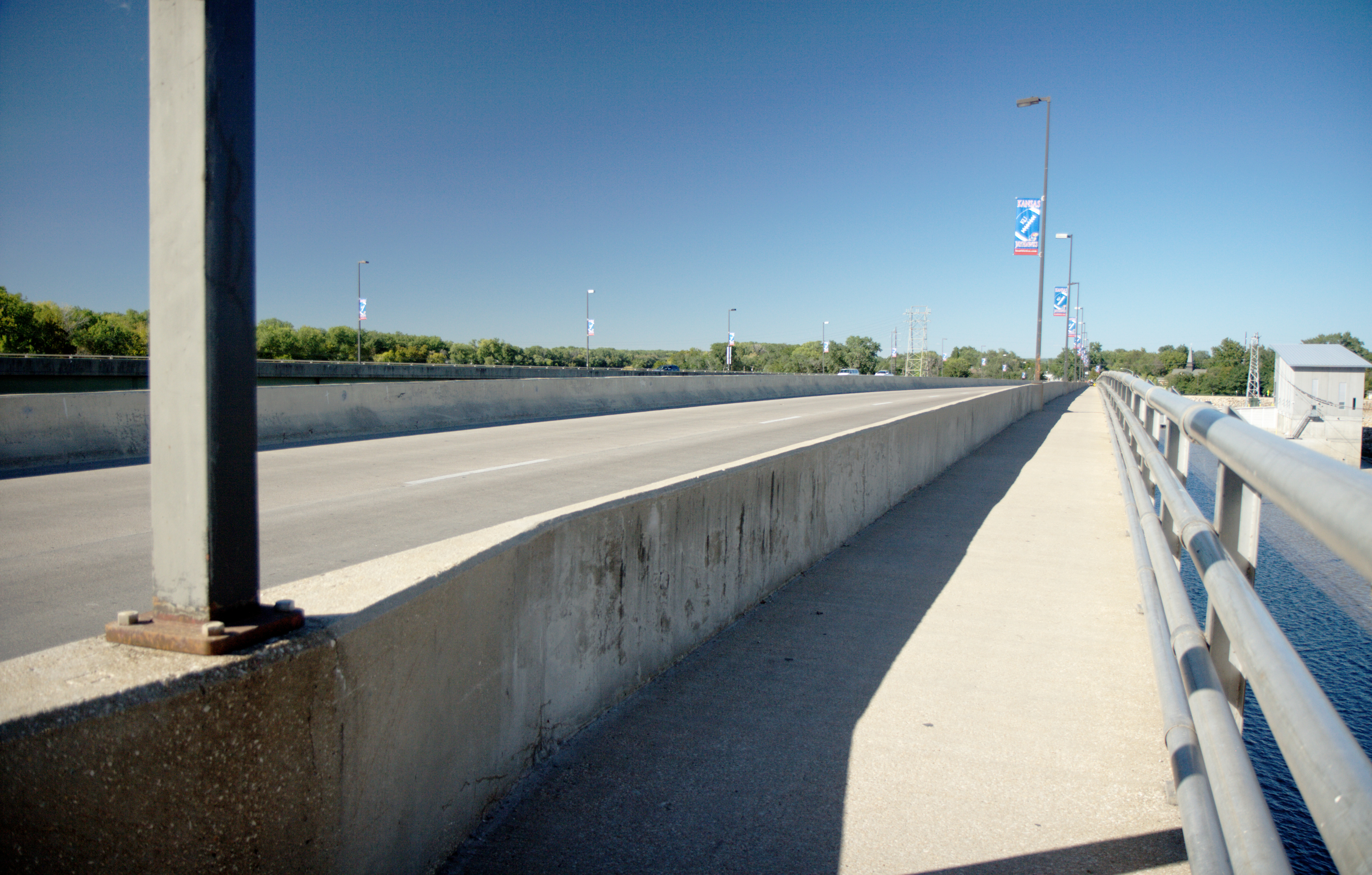
The pedestrian walkway on the east bridge

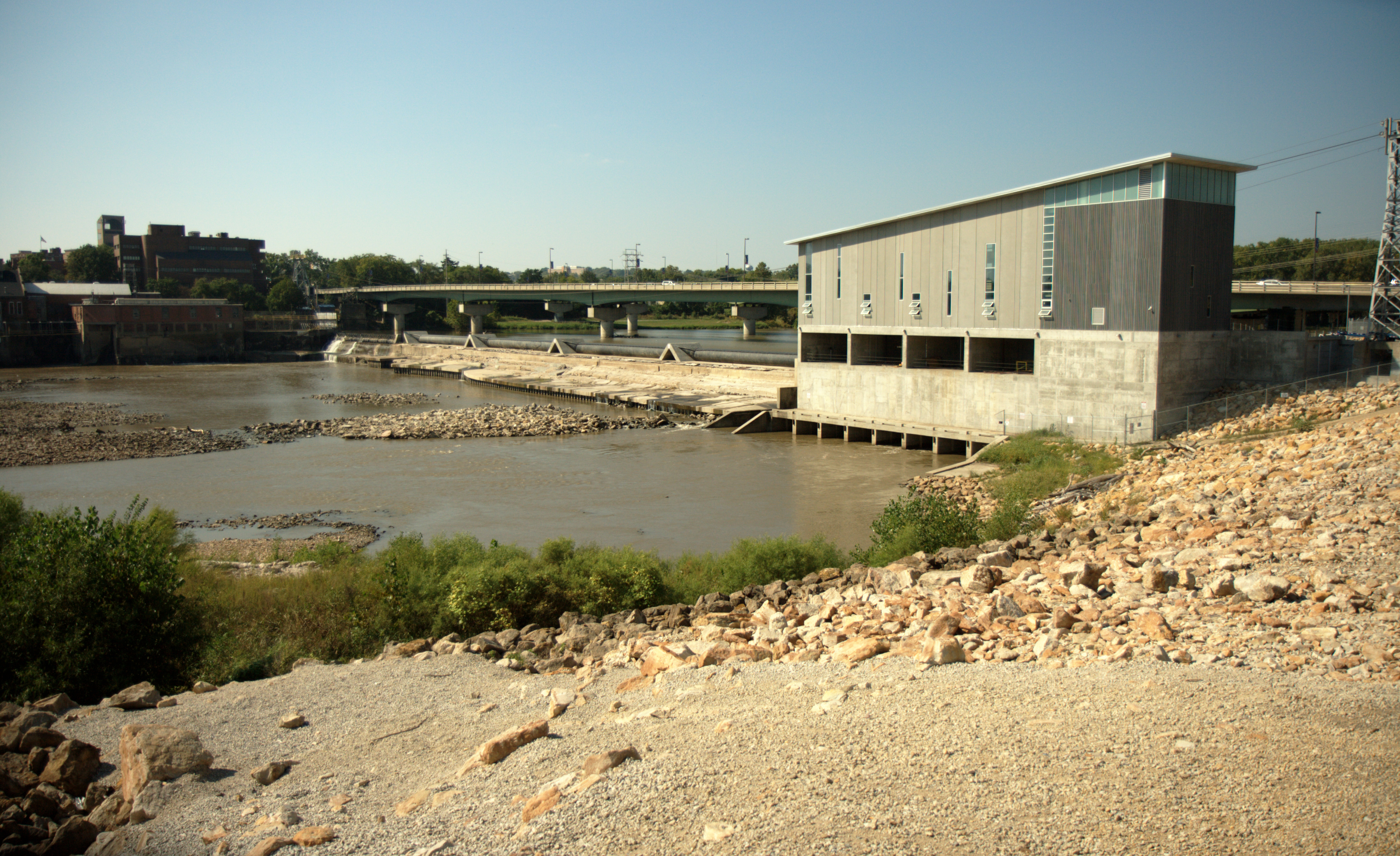
Bowersock Dam with the bridges in the background

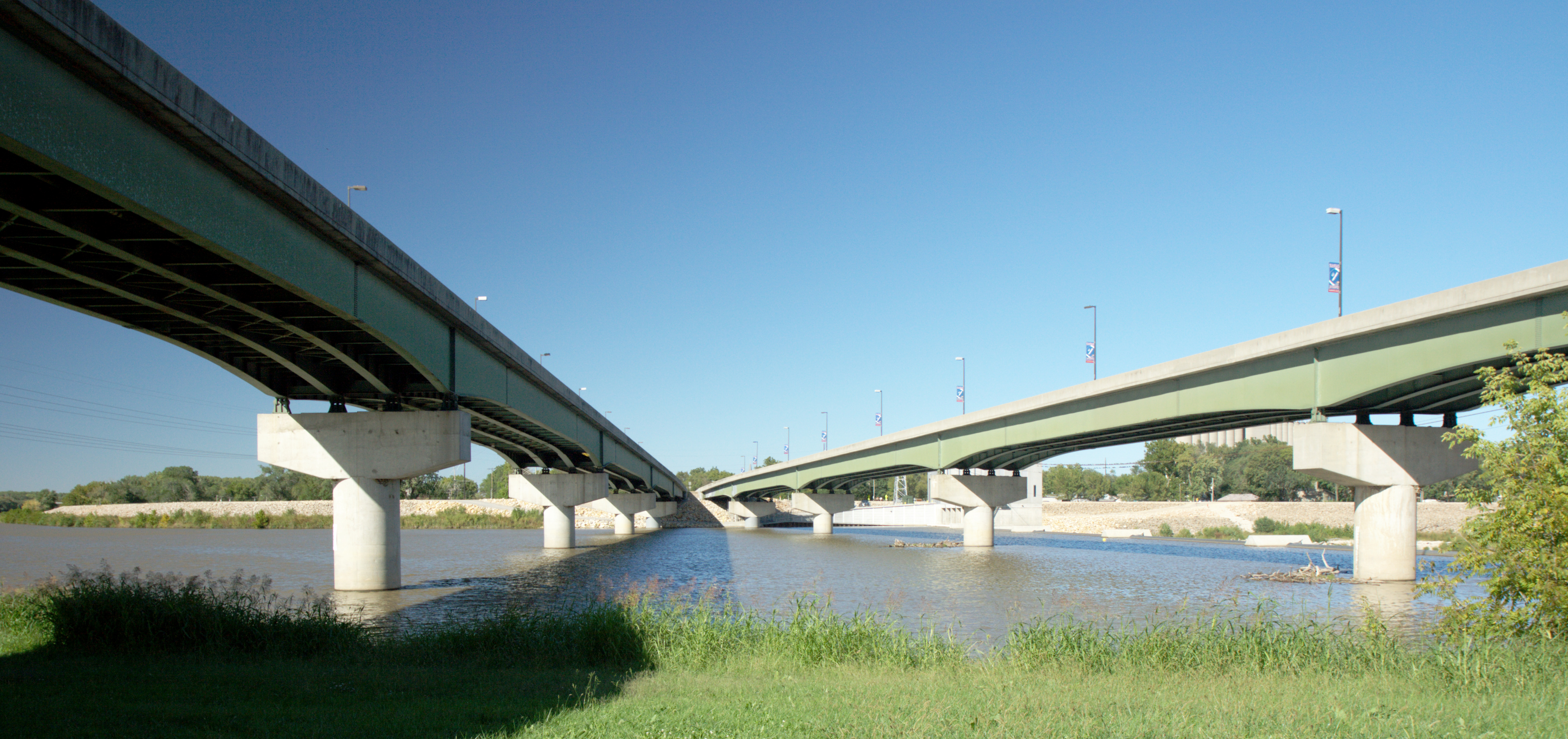
From the south bank, between the bridges

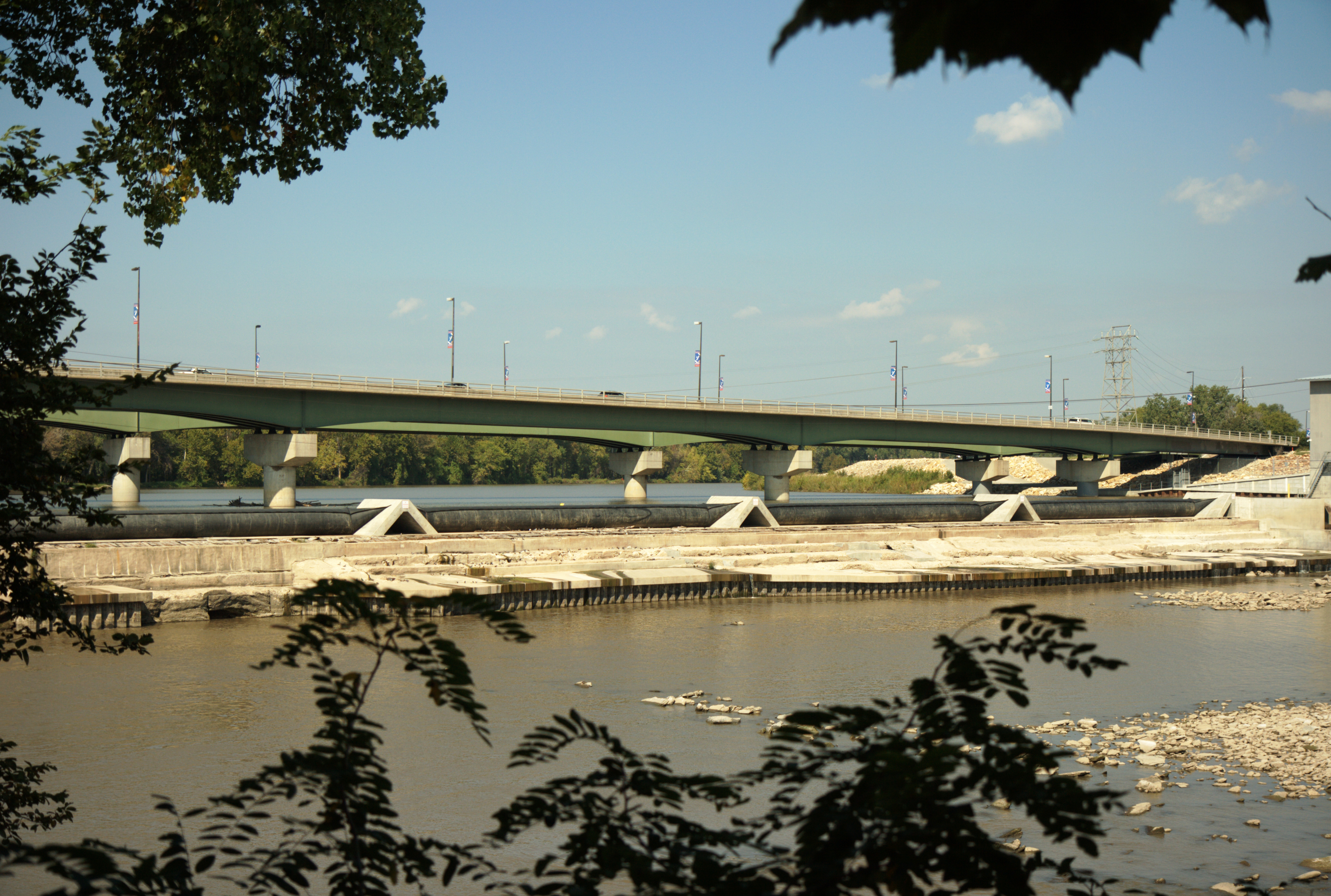
From the south bank, downstream of the bridges and dam

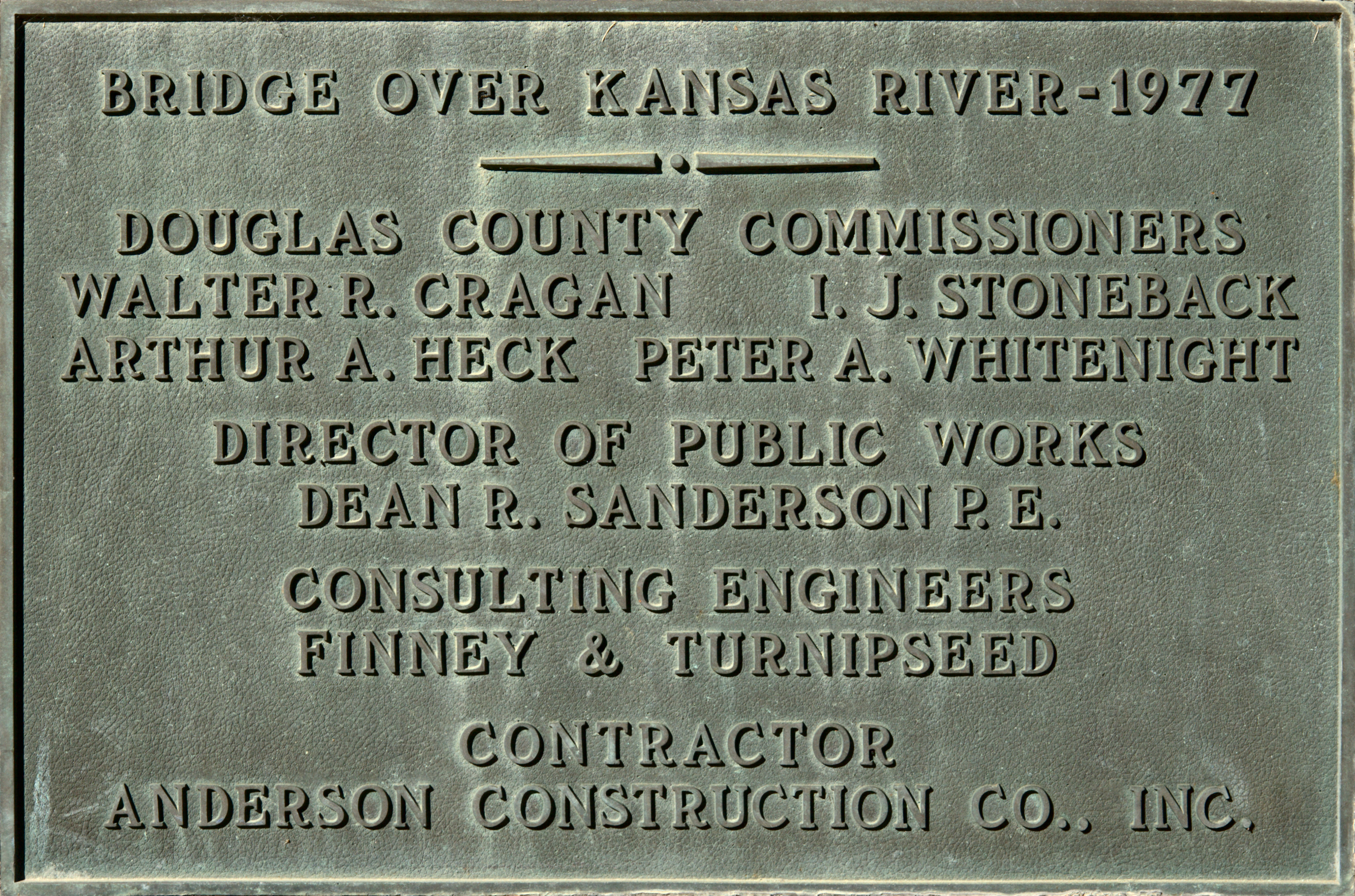
Plaque that commemorates the eastern bridge built in 1977

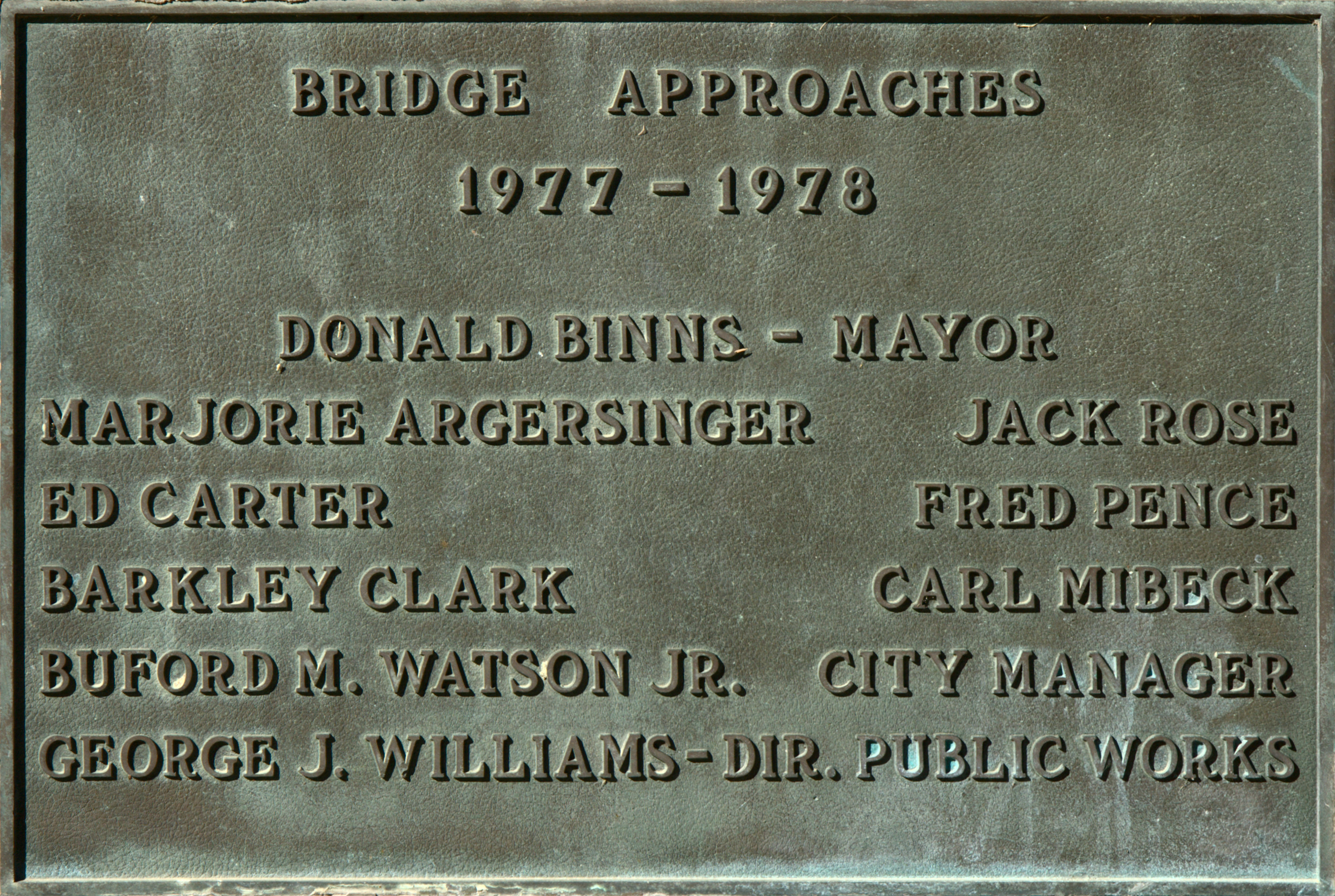
Plaque that commemorates the bridge approaches built in 1977 and 1978
