= Prairie Band Potawatomi Indian Reservation =

- Reservation
- Location of Reservation within Kansas

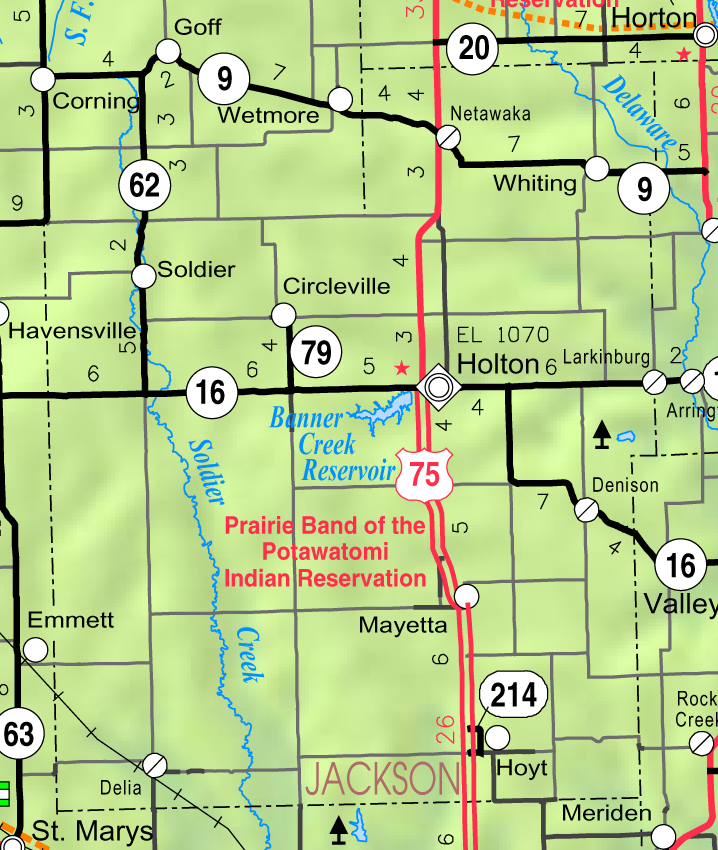
- KDOT map of Jackson County (legend)
- Coordinates: 39°20′27″N 95°50′24″W
- Country: United States
- State: Kansas
- County: Jackson
- Settled: 1837-1846

Government
  - Governing body: Tribal Council

Area
  - Total: 121.527 sq mi (314.754 km^{2})
  - Land: 121.430 sq mi (314.501 km^{2})
  - Water: 0.098 sq mi (0.253 km^{2}) 0.08%

Population (2000)
  - Total: 1,238
  - Density: 10.20/sq mi (3.936/km^{2})
- Time zone: UTC−6 (CST)
  - Summer (DST): UTC−5 (CDT)
- Area code: 785
- Website: pbpindiantribe.com

The Prairie Band Potawatomi Indian Reservation is an Indian reservation for the Prairie Band Potawatomi Nation in Jackson County, Kansas, United States. The Potawatomi used to be located in the Great Lakes area, but were forced to move west due to Europeans settling their land. The reservation encompasses all of Lincoln Township, plus parts of Banner Township, Franklin Township, and Grant Township.
