= Adrian Township, Kansas =

Adrian Township
- Township
- Location in Jackson County
- Coordinates: 39°21′00″N 95°59′16″W
- Country: United States
- State: Kansas
- County: Jackson

Area
  - Total: 29.83 sq mi (77.26 km^{2})
  - Land: 29.75 sq mi (77.06 km^{2})
  - Water: 0.077 sq mi (0.2 km^{2}) 0.26%
- Elevation: 1,138 ft (347 m)

Population (2020)
  - Total: 188
  - Density: 6.32/sq mi (2.44/km^{2})
- GNIS feature ID: 0476130

Adrian Township is a township in Jackson County, Kansas, United States. As of the 2020 census, its population was 188.

== Geography ==
Adrian Township covers an area of 29.83 square miles (77.26 square kilometers); of this, 0.08 square miles (0.2 square kilometers) or 0.26 percent is water. The stream of Long Branch runs through this township.

=== Adjacent townships ===
- Grant Township (north)
- Lincoln Township (east)
- Washington Township (south)
- Emmett Township, Pottawatomie County (west)
- St. Clere Township, Pottawatomie County (west)
- Lincoln Township, Pottawatomie County (northwest)

=== Cemeteries ===
The township contains two cemeteries: Adrian and Shields.
