= K-4 (Kansas highway) =

State highway in Kansas, U.S.

K-4
- K-4 highlighted in red

Route information
- Maintained by KDOT and the city of Lindsborg
- Length: 369.079 mi (593.975 km)
- Existed: 1927–present

Major junctions
- West end: US-83 north of Scott City
- US-283 in Ransom; US-183 in La Crosse; US-281 in Hoisington; I-135 / US-81 from Lindsborg to Assaria; US-77 in Herington; I-70 / US-40 west of Topeka; I-470 / US-75 in Topeka; US-75 in Topeka; I-70 / I-470 / Kansas Turnpike in Topeka; US-24 northeast of Topeka
- East end: US-59 in Nortonville

Location
- Country: United States
- State: Kansas
- Counties: Scott, Lane, Ness, Rush, Barton, Rice, Ellsworth, McPherson, Saline, Dickinson, Morris, Wabaunsee, Shawnee, Jefferson

Highway system
- Kansas State Highway System; Interstate; US; State; Spurs
← K-3	→ K-5

K-4 is the longest designated state highway in Kansas, at 369.079 miles (593.975 km). It begins north of Scott City at U.S. Route 83 (US-83) and travels eastward to US-59 near Nortonville in northeast Kansas. A segment of the highway in Saline County overlaps Interstate 135 (I-135) and US-81, and a section in Topeka runs concurrent with I-70. It also intersects several other major highways, including US-283 in Ransom, US-183 in La Crosse, US-281 in Hoisington, US-77 in Herington, I-470 and US-75 in Topeka, and US-24 northeast of Topeka.

K-4 was first designated by KDOT in 1927, and at that time ran from K-1 (now U.S. Route 183) in La Crosse eastward to the Missouri state line by Atchison. By 1932, the highway was extended westward along the former alignment of K-52 to its current western terminus. Then in December 1994, K-4 was truncated to US-59 in Nortonville.

== Route description ==
=== Western Kansas ===
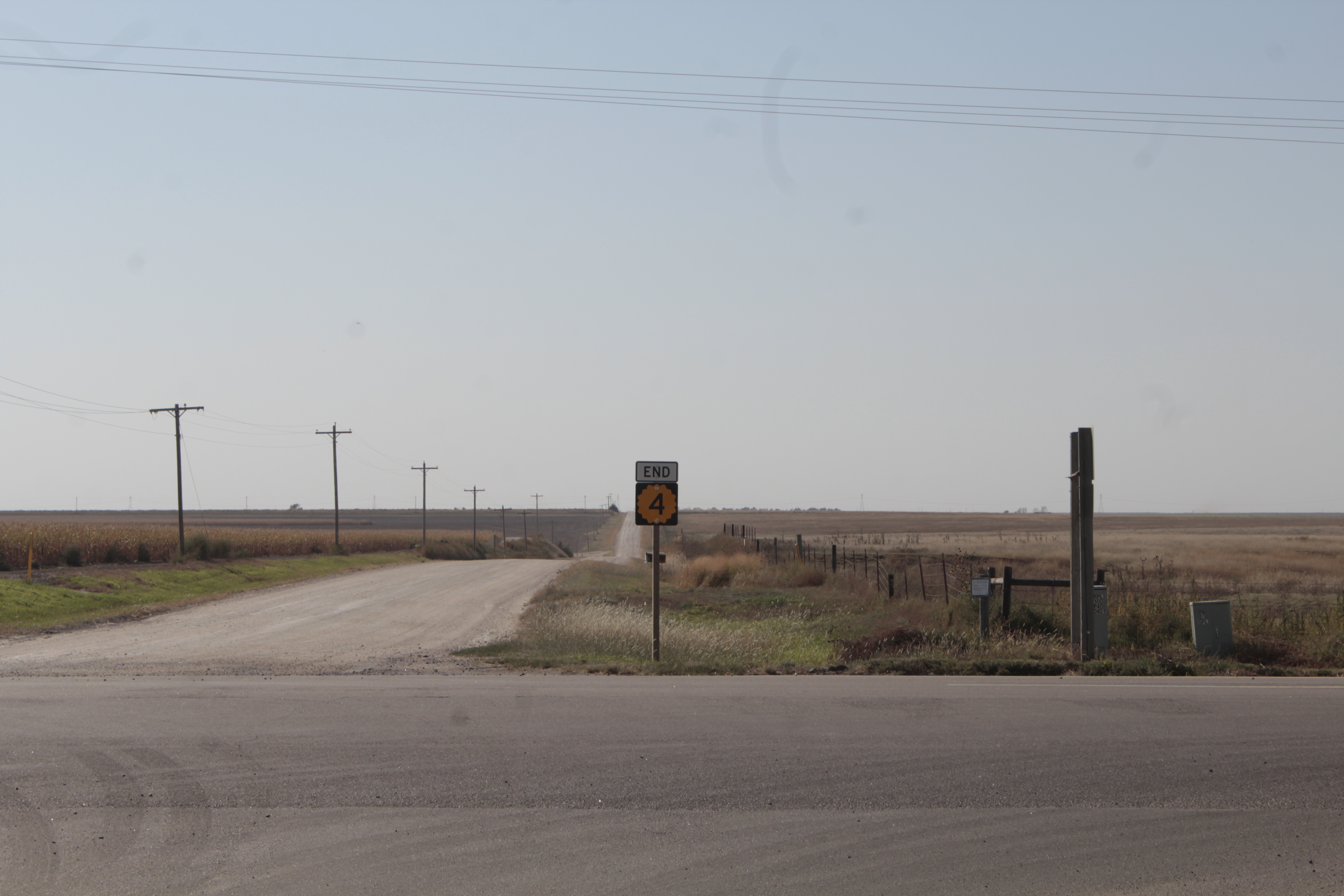
The western terminus of K-4 at US-83 North of Scott City

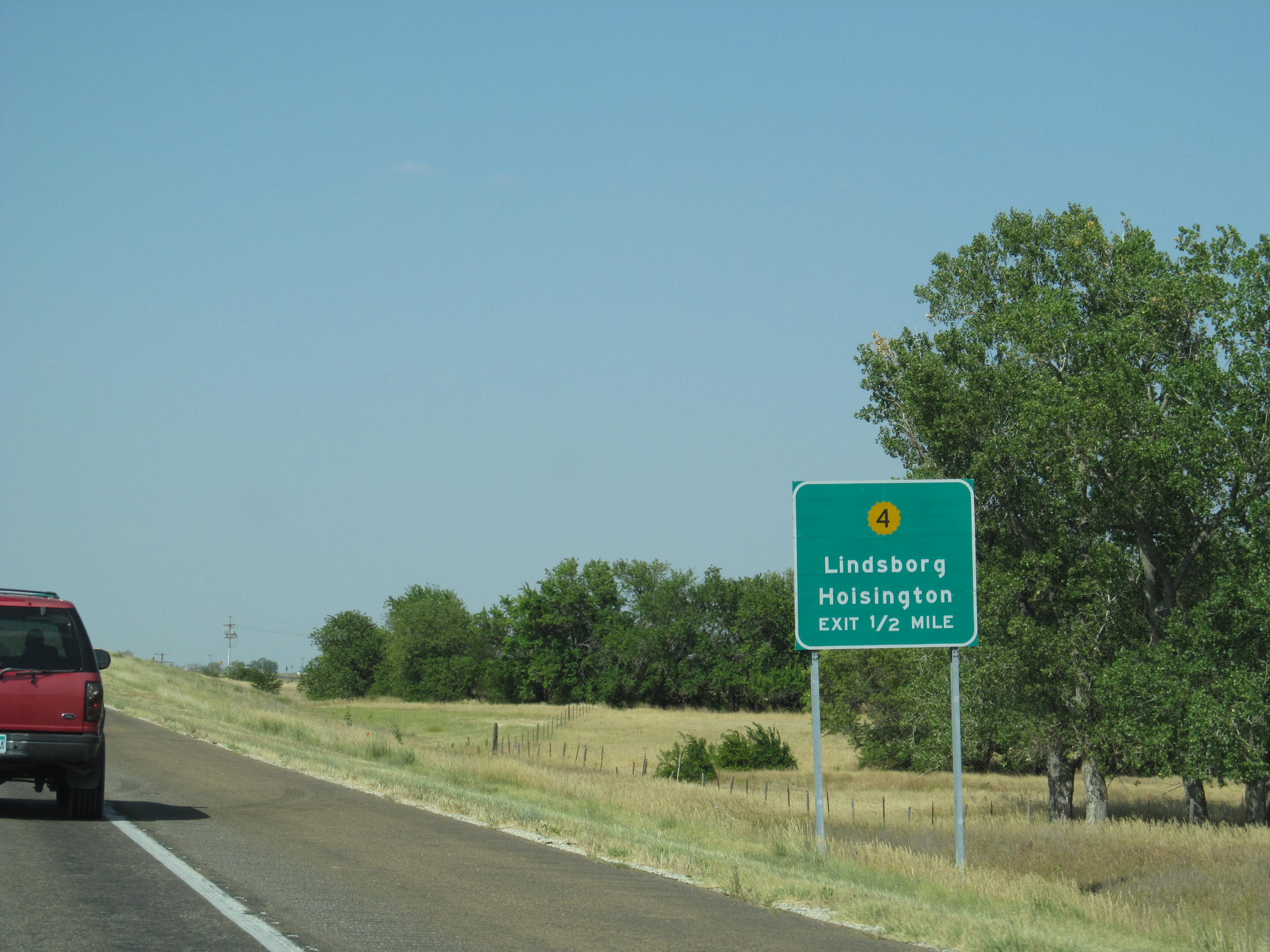
K-156 approaching K-4 interchange

K-4 runs to the north of K-96 between its western terminus and the K-14 junction in Rice County. The route begins in rural Scott County at an intersection with U.S. Route 83. Sixteen miles (26 km) east of here, it passes through the town of Healy. About six miles (9.7 km) further east, it has a two-mile-long (3.2 km) concurrency with K-23. From here, K-4 continues east as it serves the towns of Shields, Utica, Arnold, before reaching Ransom, where it intersects US-283. After passing through Brownell, K-4 serves as the southern terminus of K-147. K-4 then turns southward to bisect McCracken before turning to the east to cross US-183 in La Crosse, the county seat of Rush County.

From La Crosse, K-4 heads due east, running through Otis as it approaches the Barton County line. It then meets US-281 in a T-intersection and begins an overlap with it. This overlap carries the two routes through to Hoisington, where they split up. K-4 then runs through Redwing and Claflin. East of Claflin, K-4 has a full folded diamond interchange with K-156. K-4 bypasses Bushton (which can be accessed via K-171) and cuts through Frederick before having a junction with K-14. It then runs just north of Geneseo and along the Rice/Ellsworth County line. The highway then moves fully into Ellsworth County, where it meets the south end of K-141.

=== Central Kansas ===
K-4 then enters McPherson County. It runs just north of Marquette, which lies at the opposite end of the former K-175, before heading towards downtown Lindsborg. In Lindsborg, K-4 encounters former US-81 Business, before heading north out of town and into Saline County. It then heads north in a concurrency with I-135 and US-81. K-4 merges onto the northbound freeway at exit 78, then splits off again at exit 82. The highway then bypasses Assaria to the west before heading north to spawn a child route, K-104, after which it turns due east once again. K-4 next serves Gypsum and Carlton before intersecting K-15. It then continues east to Hope, serving as the southern terminus for K-43 in the latter.

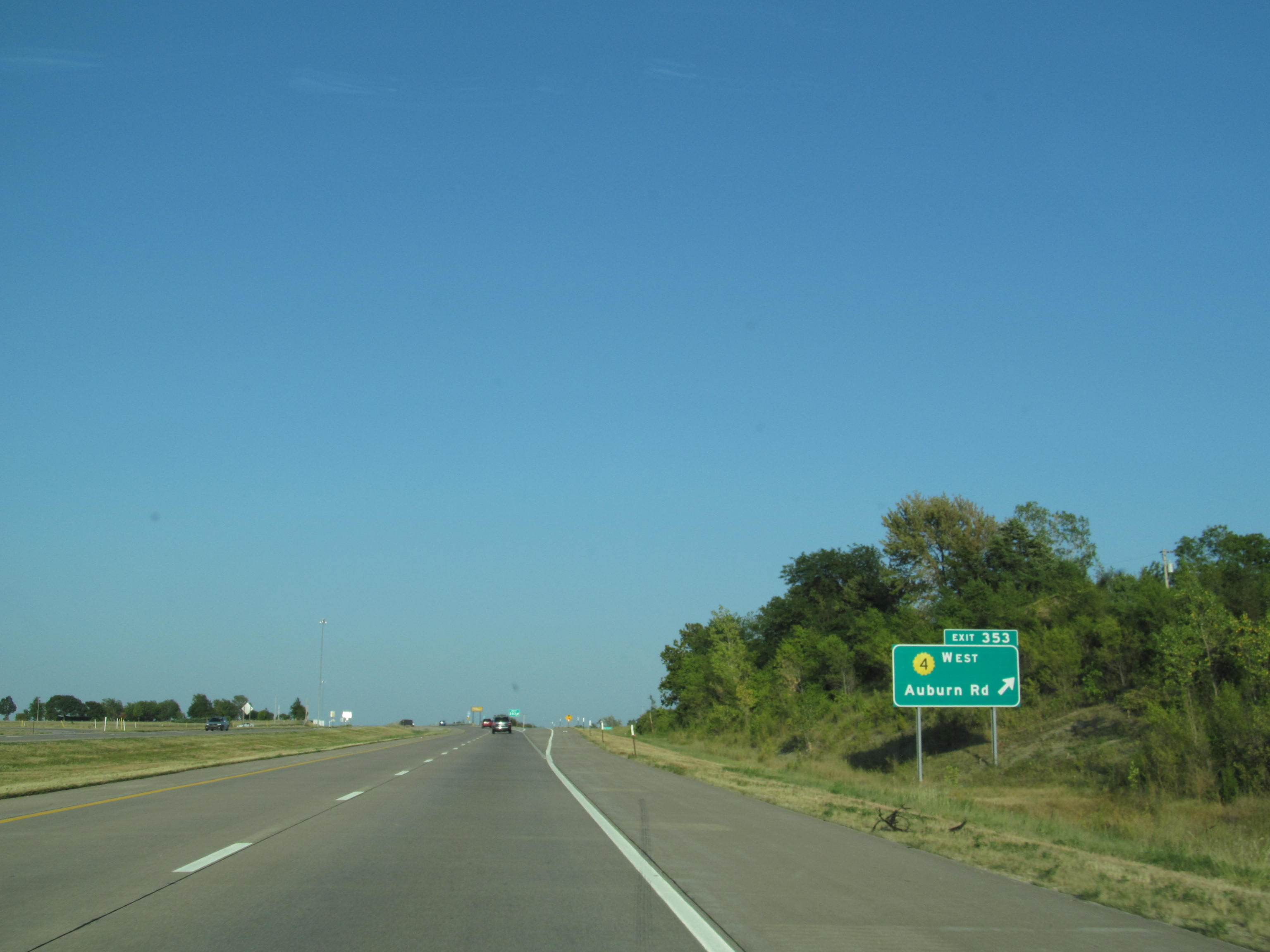
I-70 eastbound at west end of K-4 / I-70 overlap

K-4 then runs north of the town of Herington. Near Herington, K-4 junctions with two north–south highways that connect through town: K-218 and US-77. Also near Herington, K-4 gets within two miles (3.2 km) of US-56, but never actually intersects it. It then zig-zags northeast through Latimer before turning north at the northern end of K-149. The roadway then runs through White City and Dwight, where it intersects K-57. K-4 then has a brief concurrency with K-177, and 14 miles (23 km) after that concurrency ends, it forms another one with K-99. The two routes split apart in Eskridge. It then serves Dover before merging onto eastbound I-70 which is concurrent with US-40.

The freeway then enter the state capital, Topeka. The next interchange, is for I-470 and is also where US-75 joins, forming a four-way overlap. US-75 then splits off on its own freeway at exit 358A. The freeway then snakes around downtown Topeka. At the East Topeka interchange, the Kansas Turnpike joins the mainline, and I-70 merges onto it. US-40 and K-4 split off to the north to their own freeway.

=== East of Topeka ===
US-40 splits off K-4 at the first interchange north of I-70. K-4 then downgrades to a Super-2 freeway. The next interchange (with Seward Avenue) serves Philip Billard Municipal Airport. K-4 then crosses the Kansas River and merges onto the US-24 expressway before splitting off again at the next interchange. K-4 then returns to its normal rural highway configuration.

K-4 then curves southeast of Meriden (the former state route K-245 existed to connect the town to K-4 until dissolved in 2014). It then passes the west end of K-92 near Rock Creek. It then has a brief overlap with K-16 in the Valley Falls area. K-4 then angles northeast to pass just south of Nortonville. Finally, K-4 comes to an end at US-59 just southeast of Nortonville.

== History ==
=== Original alignment ===
K-4 was first designated by KDOT in 1927, and at that time began at K-1 (now US-183) in La Crosse. From La Crosse, K-4 followed its current alignment east to Herington. Past Herington, K-4 continued east on US-50N (now US-56) to Council Grove, where it then followed a series of now unnumbered roadways to rejoin its present alignment at Eskridge. From Eskridge to west of Topeka, K-4 was identical to its current routing; however, at the intersection of SW Auburn Road and SW 21st Street, where K-4 currently continues north to access I-70, K-4 turned east, following SW 21st Street into Topeka. At Topeka Boulevard, K-4 turned north, following the street out of the city.

K-4 remained on Topeka Boulevard north to an intersection with NE 82nd Street south of the Shawnee–Jackson county line. K-4 headed east on 82nd to Meriden, where it rejoined its modern routing near the modern intersection of K-4 and Butler Road east of Meriden. From Meriden to Valley Falls, K-4 did not follow its current alignment. Instead of bypassing Rock Creek, K-4 continued into Rock Creek on (what is now) Rock Creek Rd. K-4 continued North and curved to the east on 114th. From there K-4 continued east until Decatur Rd. where it curved back to the North. From there it continued north until curving back to the east on 134th, continuing on to Edwards Road where it curved to the north. From there K-4 went north to 142nd before curving back to the east. From here, it continued on to Valley Falls.

Past Valley Falls, K-4 followed 162nd Street and modern K-16 east to Osage Road, where the route intersected K-16. At the time, K-4 and K-16 overlapped northward along Osage Road to Nortonville, then followed the modern alignments of US-159 and K-116 to Cummings. Between Cummings and Atchison, K-4 and K-16 zig-zagged across several roadways surrounding the current alignment of US-59 before joining the modern routing of US-59 just west of Atchison. In Atchison, K-16 split from K-4 and headed northward on modern K-7 while K-4 continued to the Missouri state line on current US-59.

=== Extensions and realignments ===
K-52
- Location: North of Scott City–La Crosse
- Existed: 1927–1932

By 1932, K-4 was extended westward from La Crosse, along the former K-52, to US-83 north of Scott City. Then in a May 5, 1940 resolution, it was extended two miles (3.2 km) farther west to meet a new alignment of US-83. From Herington to Eskridge, as well as between Topeka and Meriden, the modern routing of K-4 was unnumbered. Past Meriden, most of K-4's current roadway was unbuilt.

In a June 19, 1936 resolution, K-4 was realigned slightly within La Crosse, which eliminated a short overlap with K-1 (modern US-183). In an August 7, 1941 resolution, the highway was realigned to the south of Ransom, which eliminated two railroad crossings. In a separate August 7, 1941 resolution, K-4 was realigned from Shields northeastward to Pendennis to eliminate four sharp curves. In a June 5, 1945 resolution, K-4 was realigned Healy to east end of overlap with K-23. This realignment also eliminated a few railroad crossings. In a June 5, 1946 resolution, K-4 was realigned slightly north by Otis to eliminate two railroad crossings. In a June 24, 1953 resolution, K-4 was realigned slightly west, from Langley to northwest of Marquette. In a February 25, 1953 resolution, it was realigned from the former curve north of Bushton to K-14 east of frederick. This created an overlap with K-14 to meet its old alignment. Then in a July 14, 1954 resolution, K-4 was realigned slightly north, to the north side of Geneseo. This realignment also eliminated the overlap with K-14. Before 1956, K-4 originally followed US-50N (now US-56) from Herington to Council Grove, then northeast along now locally maintained highways to Eskridge. Then in a February 9, 1956 resolution, it was realigned to follow and replace K-10 to K-99, then continue east to meet its old alignment in Eskridge. In an October 6, 1958 resolution, K-4 and US-59 was realigned between Cummings and Atchison to eliminate several sharp curves. Then in a July 10, 1957 resolution, K-4 and US-59 was realigned further southwestward from Cummings to Nortonville. In a February 25, 1959 resolution, K-4 was realigned between Meriden and Valley Falls to remove some dangerous curves.

In a March 22, 1960 resolution, K-4 Alternate was to be established from K-4 north to US-40 and I-70, west of Topeka. But then in a July 11, 1962 resolution, it was rescinded and K-4 had been extended north to US-40 and I-70 along the proposed K-4 Alternate. In an August 10, 1960 resolution, K-4 and US-59 was realigned to the east of Nortonville, and US-159 alternate was created. Then roughly 20 years later, K-4 Alternate was created and replaced US-159 Alternate. K-4 originally travelled west from Meriden to US-75, which it then followed south to US-24 in Topeka. Then in a December 4, 1963 resolution, it was realigned to continue south from Meriden to US-24, then followed US-24 west into Topeka. In an April 21, 1967 resolution, K-4 and K-16 was realigned in and around Valley Falls to make way for the new Perry Reservoir. Also at this time a short K-4 spur was created, and when extended was to become a new alignment of K-4 between Valley Falls and Nortonville. In a September 9, 1969 resolution, K-4 was realigned slightly within Lindsborg and onto US-81. In a January 4, 1982 resolution, US-81, along K-4 from Lindsborg to US-81 in Bridgeport, was redesignated as US-81 Business. In an October 10, 1991 resolution, K-4 was extended south from US-24 to US-40 west of Tecumseh.

Between 1968 and 1997, K-4 was aligned along US-75 between I-70/US-40 and US-24 and then US-24 in Topeka. In 1997, the Oakland Expressway, serving eastern Topeka, was opened and K-4 gained its current route through Topeka. On December 1, 1994, K-4's eastern terminus was truncated to US-59 in Nortonville.

== Future ==
In May 2020, KDOT's Eisenhower Legacy Transportation Plan was announced. One project included in the statewide plan will reconstruct K-4 from 0.5 miles (0.80 km) west of Simpson Road to 400 feet (120 m) east of Niles Road.

== Major intersections ==
County	Location	mi	km	Exit	Destinations	Notes
Scott		0.00	0.00		US-83 (Western Vistas Historic Byway) – Scott City, Oakley	Western terminus; road continues as Road 230 (unpaved)
Lane		21.84	35.15		K-23 north	Western end of K-23 concurrency
Lane		23.86	38.40		K-23 south	Eastern end of K-23 concurrency
Ness	Ransom	55.12	88.71		US-283	
Ness		64.11	103.18		K-147 north	Southern terminus of K-147
Rush	La Crosse	93.67	150.75		US-183	
Barton		118.77	191.14		US-281 north	Western end of US-281 concurrency
Barton	Hoisington	123.36	198.53		US-281 south	Eastern end of US-281 concurrency
Barton		138.14	222.31		K-156	Folded diamond interchange
Rice	Geneseo	154.74	249.03		K-14	
Ellsworth		169.59	272.93		K-141 north	Southern terminus of K-141
McPherson	No major junctions					
Saline		190.40	306.42		I-135 / US-81 south – Wichita	I-135 exit 78; western end of concurrency with I-135/US-81
Saline	Assaria	194.49	313.00		I-135 / US-81 north – Salina	I-135 exit 82; eastern end of concurrency with I-135/US-81
Saline		197.04	317.11		K-104 north	Southern terminus of K-104
Dickinson	Elmo	220.03	354.10		K-15	
Dickinson	Hope	229.04	368.60		K-43 north	Southern terminus of K-43
Dickinson	Herington	234.78	377.84		K-218 south	Northern terminus of K-218
Dickinson	Herington	236.79	381.08		US-77	
Morris		249.06	400.82		K-149 south	Northern terminus of K-149
Morris	Dwight	264.06	424.96		K-57 north	Southern terminus of K-57
Morris–Wabaunsee county line		269.05	432.99		K-177 south – Council Grove	Western end of K-177 concurrency
Morris–Wabaunsee county line		270.05	434.60		K-177 north – Manhattan	Eastern end of K-177 concurrency
Wabaunsee		283.97	457.01		K-99 north	Western end of K-99 concurrency
Wabaunsee	Eskridge	294.12	473.34		K-99 south	Eastern end of K-99 concurrency
Shawnee		321.53	517.45		I-70 / US-40 west – Salina	I-70 exit 353; western end of concurrency with I-70/US-40
Shawnee	Topeka	323.62	520.82	355	I-470 east / US-75 south – Topeka	Western end of concurrency with US-75; western terminus of I-470; exit numbers follow I-70
Shawnee	Topeka	324.52	522.26	356	Wanamaker Road	
Shawnee	Topeka	325.65	524.08	357A	Fairlawn Road	Signed as exit 357 eastbound
Shawnee	Topeka	326.12	524.84	357B	Danbury Lane	Westbound exit only
Shawnee	Topeka	326.16	524.90	358A	US-75 north	Eastern end of concurrency with US-75; signed as exit 358 eastbound
Shawnee	Topeka	326.54	525.52	358B	Gage Boulevard	Signed as exit 358 eastbound
Shawnee	Topeka	327.56	527.16	359	MacVicar Avenue	
Shawnee	Topeka	329.23	529.84	361A	1st Avenue	Provides access to Topeka Boulevard. Eastbound exit and westbound entrance.
Shawnee	Topeka	329.94	530.99	361B	3rd Street, Monroe Street	Eastbound exit and westbound entrance
Shawnee	Topeka	330.04– 330.66	531.15– 532.15	362A	4th Street	Westbound exit and eastbound entrance
Shawnee	Topeka	330.04– 330.66	531.15– 532.15	362B	8th Avenue	Signed as exit 362 eastbound
Shawnee	Topeka	330.04– 330.66	531.15– 532.15	362C	10th Avenue, Madison Street	Westbound exit and eastbound entrance
Shawnee	Topeka	331.11	532.87	363	Adams Street, Branner Trafficway	
Shawnee	Topeka	332.08	534.43	364A	California Avenue	
Shawnee	Topeka	332.82	535.62	364B	Carnahan Avenue, Deer Creek Trafficway	
Shawnee	Topeka	333.58	536.84	365	Rice Road	
Shawnee	Topeka	334.39	538.15	—	I-70 / Kansas Turnpike east – Kansas City	I-70 exit 366; eastern end of I-70 concurrency
Shawnee	Topeka	334.39	538.15	West end of super two		
Shawnee	Topeka	335.44	539.84	—	US-40 east (6th Street)	Eastern end of US-40 concurrency
Shawnee	Topeka	336.48	541.51	—	Seward Avenue	
Shawnee		339.01	545.58	—	US-24 west – Manhattan	Western end of US-24 concurrency
Shawnee		339.01	545.58	East end of super two		
Shawnee		339.66	546.63	—	US-24 east – Lawrence	Diamond interchange; eastern end of US-24 concurrency
Jefferson	Meriden	346.34	557.38		K-245 north	Southern terminus of K-245
Jefferson		350.80	564.56		K-92 east	Western terminus of K-92
Jefferson	Valley Falls	360.26	579.78		K-16 west	Western end of K-16 concurrency
Jefferson	Valley Falls	361.07	581.09		K-16 east	Eastern end of K-16 concurrency
Jefferson	Nortonville	368.62	593.24		K-4 Alt. east (Osage Street) – Nortonville, Hiawatha	Western terminus of K-4 Alt.
Jefferson	Nortonville	369.08	593.98		US-59 – Atchison, Oskaloosa	Eastern terminus; highway continues north as US-59
1.000 mi = 1.609 km; 1.000 km = 0.621 mi: Concurrency terminus; Incomplete access; Route transition

== Alternate route ==
K-4 Alternate
- Location: Nortonville
- Length: 1.100 mi (1.770 km)
- Existed: April 1, 1981–present

K-4 Alternate is a 1.100-mile-long (1.770 km) alternate route of K-4 that serves Nortonville. It begins at K-4 and travels north to an intersection with US-159. At US-159, K-4 Alt. turns eastward and the two highways run east together and end at an intersection on the east Nortonville city line at US-59. K-4 Alt. was designated on April 1, 1981, and its alignment has not changed since.
