= Birmingham, Kansas =

Unincorporated community in Jackson County, Kansas

Coordinates: 39°24′33″N 95°40′57″W

Birmingham is an unincorporated community in Franklin Township, Jackson County, Kansas, United States.

== History ==
A post office was opened in Birmingham in 1888, and remained in operation until it was discontinued in 1942.
