= Denison, Kansas =

City in Jackson County, Kansas

- City
- Location within Jackson County and Kansas

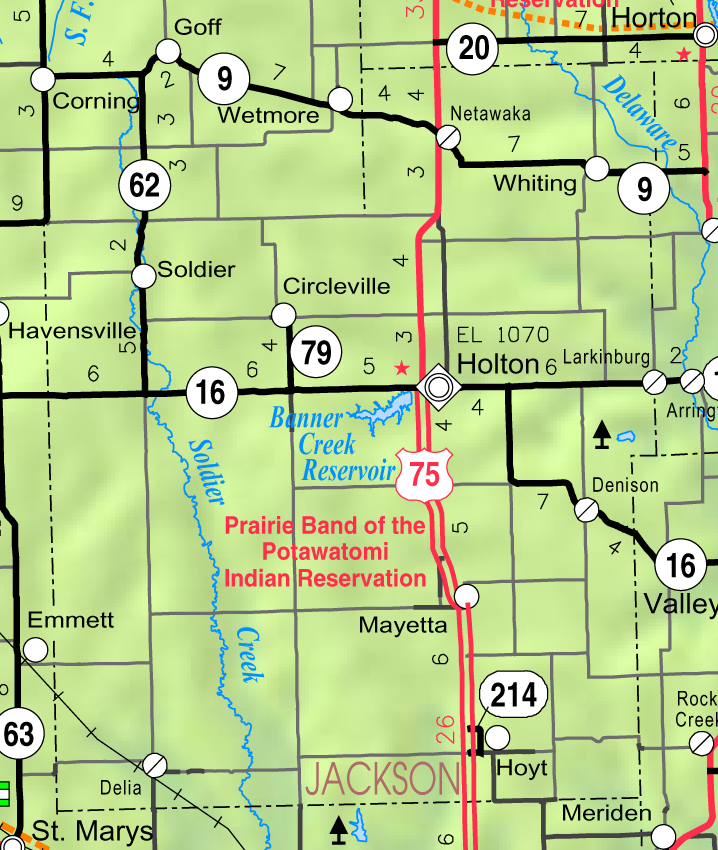
- KDOT map of Jackson County (legend)
- Coordinates: 39°23′38″N 95°37′42″W
- Country: United States
- State: Kansas
- County: Jackson
- Township: Garfield & Cedar
- Founded: 1887
- Incorporated: 1904

Area
  - Total: 0.11 sq mi (0.29 km^{2})
  - Land: 0.11 sq mi (0.29 km^{2})
  - Water: 0 sq mi (0.00 km^{2})
- Elevation: 1,056 ft (322 m)

Population (2020)
  - Total: 146
  - Density: 1,300/sq mi (500/km^{2})
- Time zone: UTC-6 (CST)
  - Summer (DST): UTC-5 (CDT)
- ZIP Code: 66419
- Area code: 785
- FIPS code: 20-17625
- GNIS ID: 2394515

Denison is a city in Jackson County, Kansas, United States. As of the 2020 census, the population of the city was 146.

== History ==
=== 19th century ===
Denison was founded as a result of the Kansas City, Wyandotte and Northwestern Railway laying tracks that would connect the communities of Valley Falls and Holton. The railroad was slated to come through one mile south of an existing village, Tippinville, and in September 1887, A.D. Walker and Hollis Tucker, land speculators, laid out lots for a new town, which was named after Tucker's hometown of Denison, Ohio. Most of the houses and two churches in Tippinville were physically moved to the new townsite, which is primarily in Garfield Township, with a small portion in Cedar Township (it was all Cedar Township at first). By August 1890, Tippinvile had been officially vacated and by 1894 Denison had a population of 150.

A number of Civil War veterans are buried in the Denison Cemetery (and nearby cemeteries, North and South Cedar Cemeteries), and there is one veteran of the Mexican–American War, G. W. White, buried at Denison. Eliza Cody Myers (Mrs. George Myers), sister of William F. "Buffalo Bill" Cody is also buried there.

A post office, named North Cedar, was established in 1867. The first school, built of logs, was established in 1858 south of present-day Denison, on the site of the North Cedar Cemetery. The first church in the area, of the Christian denomination was founded in 1856 by the Rev. J.T. Gardiner. The Reformed Presbyterian Church was established in 1871, with the Rev. J.S.T. Milligan the founding pastor; the United Presbyterian Church, in 1880; and the Denison Methodist Episcopal Church, in 1889. The Christian, United Presbyterian and Methodist churches united to become the Denison Union Church in 1958, and later became the Denison Bible Church. The Denison Christian Church building, erected in 1878, now houses the Denison Historical Museum, and is one of three Jackson Co. buildings included in the State Register of Historic Places.

=== 20th century ===
The Denison State Bank was founded in 1901, and after its second robbery, in 1938, was moved to Holton, the county seat, where it thrives today under the same name. The Denison Rural High School was established in 1916, and a brick building was erected. It burned in 1938 and a new school building was completed in 1941. Due to school district unification, the last class to graduate from Denison High School was in 1969. However the school continued to serve lower grades until it closed its doors in 1990. Area students now attend schools in Holton.

== Geography ==
According to the United States Census Bureau, the city has a total area of 0.11 square miles (0.28 km^{2}), all land.

== Demographics ==
Historical population
Census	Pop.	Note	%±
1910	295		—
1920	240		−18.6%
1930	202		−15.8%
1940	176		−12.9%
1950	166		−5.7%
1960	184		10.8%
1970	248		34.8%
1980	231		−6.9%
1990	225		−2.6%
2000	231		2.7%
2010	187		−19.0%
2020	146		−21.9%
U.S. Decennial Census

Denison is part of the Topeka, Kansas Metropolitan Statistical Area.

=== 2020 census ===
The 2020 United States census counted 146 people, 63 households, and 42 families in Denison. The population density was 1,303.6 per square mile (503.3/km^{2}). There were 82 housing units at an average density of 732.1 per square mile (282.7/km^{2}). The racial makeup was 89.73% (131) white or European American (89.04% non-Hispanic white), 0.68% (1) black or African-American, 2.74% (4) Native American or Alaska Native, 0.0% (0) Asian, 0.0% (0) Pacific Islander or Native Hawaiian, 0.0% (0) from other races, and 6.85% (10) from two or more races. Hispanic or Latino of any race was 0.68% (1) of the population.

Of the 63 households, 31.7% had children under the age of 18; 42.9% were married couples living together; 23.8% had a female householder with no spouse or partner present. 28.6% of households consisted of individuals and 17.5% had someone living alone who was 65 years of age or older. The average household size was 1.9 and the average family size was 2.8. The percent of those with a bachelor's degree or higher was estimated to be 2.1% of the population.

22.6% of the population was under the age of 18, 11.6% from 18 to 24, 24.0% from 25 to 44, 28.1% from 45 to 64, and 13.7% who were 65 years of age or older. The median age was 38.0 years. For every 100 females, there were 94.7 males. For every 100 females ages 18 and older, there were 101.8 males.

The 2016–2020 5-year American Community Survey estimates show that the median household income was $48,889 (with a margin of error of +/- $20,930) and the median family income was $85,000 (+/- $40,191). The median income for those above 16 years old was $24,844 (+/- $12,517). Approximately, 11.5% of families and 24.0% of the population were below the poverty line, including 35.3% of those under the age of 18 and 12.5% of those ages 65 or over.

=== 2010 census ===
As of the census of 2010, there were 187 people, 76 households, and 50 families residing in the city. The population density was 1,700.0 inhabitants per square mile (656.4/km^{2}). There were 87 housing units at an average density of 790.9 per square mile (305.4/km^{2}). The racial makeup of the city was 96.3% White, 0.5% Native American, and 3.2% from two or more races. Hispanic or Latino of any race were 1.1% of the population.

There were 76 households, of which 31.6% had children under the age of 18 living with them, 46.1% were married couples living together, 11.8% had a female householder with no husband present, 7.9% had a male householder with no wife present, and 34.2% were non-families. 30.3% of all households were made up of individuals, and 11.8% had someone living alone who was 65 years of age or older. The average household size was 2.46 and the average family size was 2.94.

The median age in the city was 31.8 years. 27.8% of residents were under the age of 18; 8.6% were between the ages of 18 and 24; 24.6% were from 25 to 44; 26.8% were from 45 to 64; and 12.3% were 65 years of age or older. The gender makeup of the city was 46.5% male and 53.5% female.

=== 2000 census ===
As of the census of 2000, there were 231 people, 82 households, and 62 families residing in the city. The population density was 1,973.8 inhabitants per square mile (762.1/km^{2}). There were 88 housing units at an average density of 751.9 per square mile (290.3/km^{2}). The racial makeup of the city was 93.94% White, 1.30% African American, 2.60% Native American, 1.73% from other races, and 0.43% from two or more races. Hispanic or Latino of any race were 1.73% of the population.

There were 82 households, out of which 34.1% had children under the age of 18 living with them, 59.8% were married couples living together, 12.2% had a female householder with no husband present, and 23.2% were non-families. 19.5% of all households were made up of individuals, and 11.0% had someone living alone who was 65 years of age or older. The average household size was 2.77 and the average family size was 3.19.

In the city, the population was spread out, with 28.1% under the age of 18, 12.1% from 18 to 24, 24.7% from 25 to 44, 23.8% from 45 to 64, and 11.3% who were 65 years of age or older. The median age was 33 years. For every 100 females, there were 100.9 males. For every 100 females age 18 and over, there were 102.4 males.

The median income for a household in the city was $27,500, and the median income for a family was $33,250. Males had a median income of $24,375 versus $17,778 for females. The per capita income for the city was $13,378. About 9.3% of families and 15.0% of the population were below the poverty line, including 36.6% of those under the age of eighteen and 5.6% of those 65 or over.

== Education ==
The community is served by Holton USD 336 public school district.
