= Larkinburg, Kansas =

Unincorporated community in Jackson County, Kansas

Coordinates: 39°31′07″N 95°18′35″W

Larkinburg is an unincorporated community in Atchison and Jackson counties of Kansas in the United States.

== History ==
Larkinburg was laid out in 1880. It was named for M. E. Larkin, who owned land near the original town site.
