= K-16 (Kansas highway) =

State highway in Kansas, U.S.

K-16
- K-16 highlighted in red

Route information
- Maintained by KDOT
- Length: 114.460 mi (184.206 km)

Major junctions
- West end: US-77 / CR 378 north of Randolph
- K-13 near Fostoria; K-99 near Blaine; K-63 south of Havensville; K-62 south of Soldier; US-75 in Holton; K-4 near Valley Falls; US-59 from west of Winchester to south of Oskaloosa
- East end: US-24 / US-40 in Tonganoxie

Location
- Country: United States
- State: Kansas
- Counties: Riley, Pottawatomie, Jackson, Jefferson, Leavenworth

Highway system
- Kansas State Highway System; Interstate; US; State; Spurs
| ← K-15 | → K-17 |

K-16 is a 114.460-mile-long (184.206 km) state highway in the U.S. State of Kansas. K-16's western terminus is at a junction with U.S. Route 77 (US-77) just north of Randolph and the eastern terminus is at US-24 and US-40 in Tonganoxie. Along the way K-4 intersects many major thoroughfares including US-75 in Holton, K-4 near Valley Falls and US-59 from west of Winchester to south of Oskaloosa.

== Route description ==
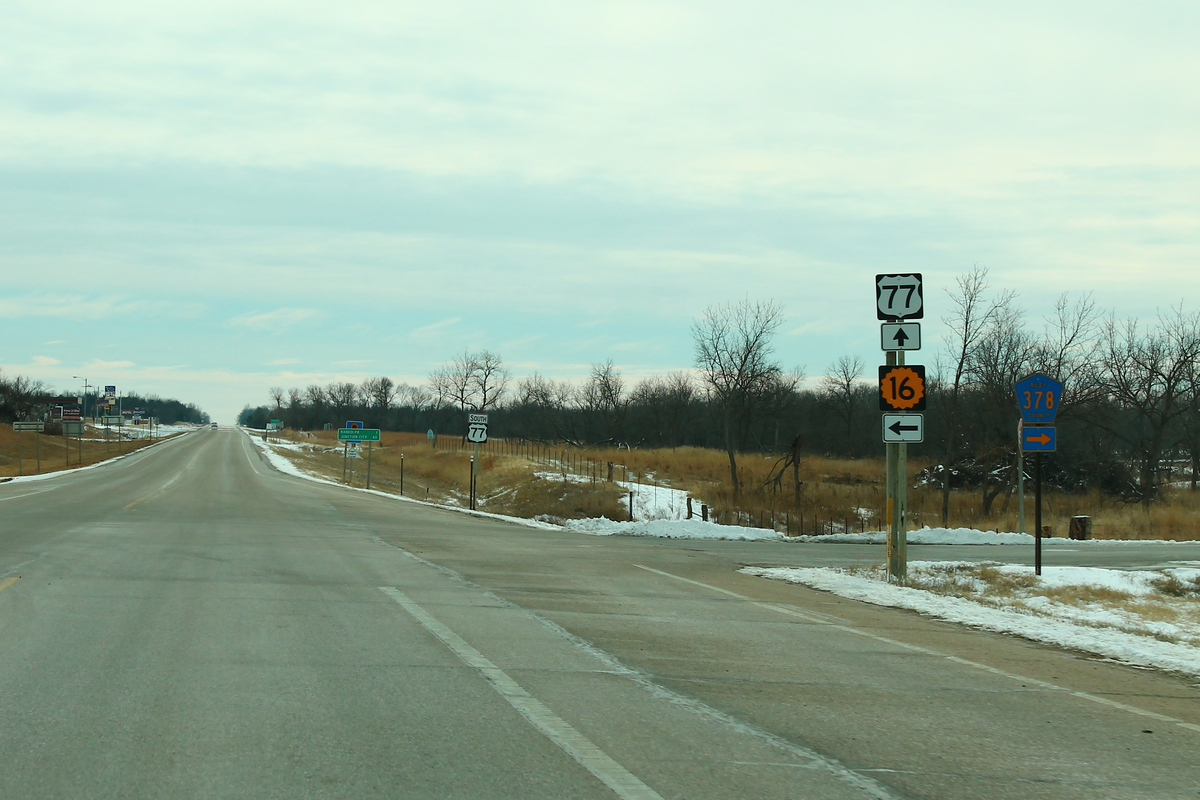
US-77 at its junction with K-16

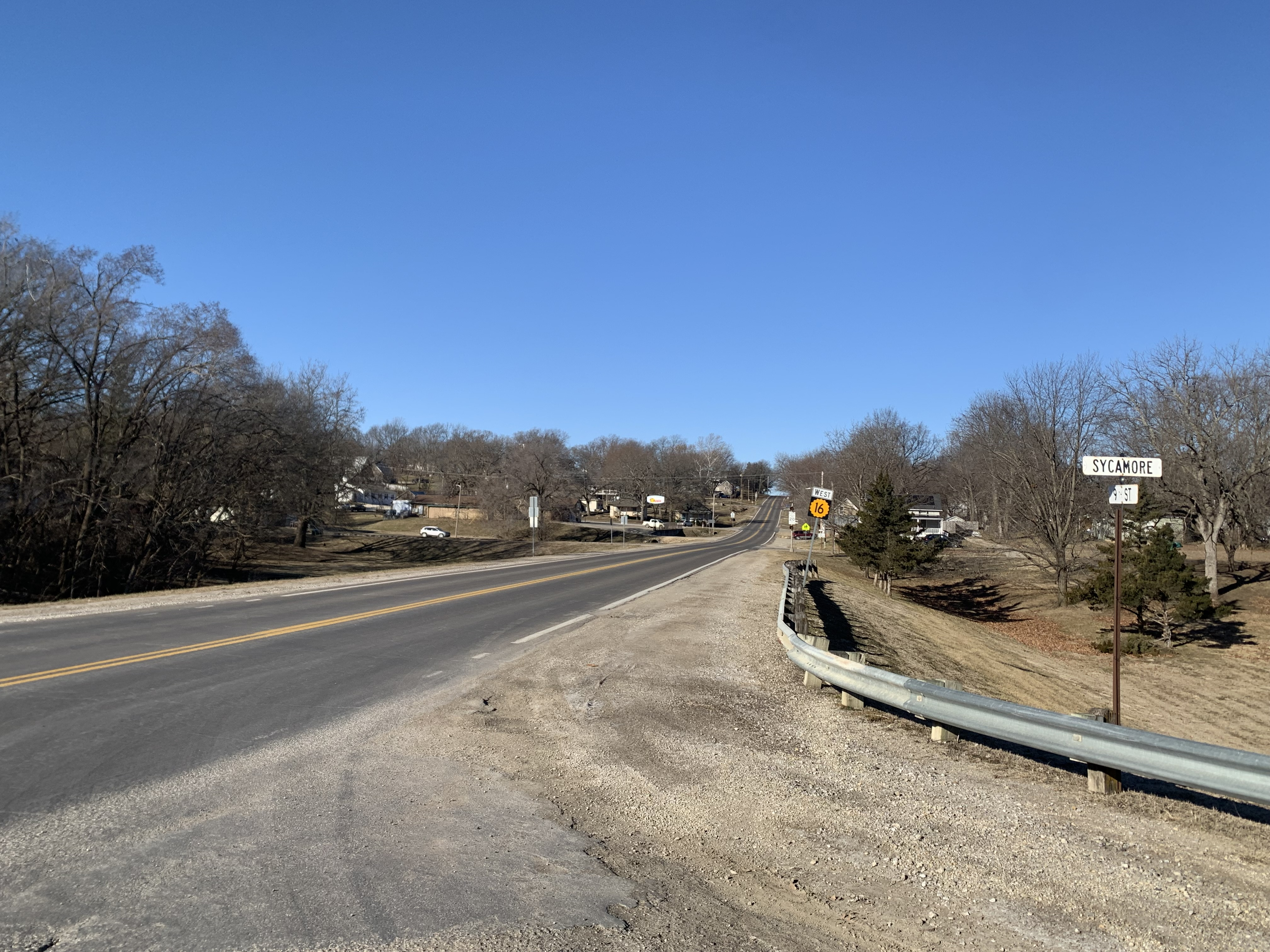
Kansas Highway 16 in Valley Falls, Kansas

K-16 begins north of Randolph on US-77 and crosses Tuttle Creek Lake. Near the town of Blaine, K-16 crosses The Oregon Trail. K-16 continues through Holton until turning south. K-116 continues to head eastward through Larkinburg and Arrington until ending at Cummings in Atchison County.

K-16 continues through Valley Falls, crossing the Delaware River until meeting with US-59. K-16 then runs concurrent with US 59 through Oskaloosa until heading east again through McLouth and winding through Leavenworth County until coming to an end at an intersection with US-24 and US-40 in Tonganoxie.

== History ==
Between 1927 and 1935, K-16 was located in Atchison County and Doniphan County, starting at US-73 in Atchison and ending at US-36 in Troy.

A southern terminus was located in Montgomery County and Neosho County starting in Chanute and ending at the Oklahoma state line in Coffeyville. In 1932, the southern section was replaced by US 169. In 1935, the remainder of K-16 became part of K-7. K-16 was reassigned as a renumbering of K-24 because of the extension of US-24 into Kansas.

== Major intersections ==
| County | Location | mi | km | Destinations | Notes |
|---|---|---|---|---|---|
| Riley | Randolph | 0.000 | 0.000 | US-77 (Tuttle Creek Boulevard) / CR 378 west (Green Randolph Road) | Western terminus; road continues as CR-378 (Green Randolph Rd.) |
| Pottawatomie | | 13.122 | 21.118 | K-13 south | Northern terminus of K-13 |
| Pottawatomie | Blaine | 21.271 | 34.232 | K-99 south | Western end of K-99 overlap |
| Pottawatomie | Blaine | 21.672 | 34.878 | K-99 north | Eastern end of K-99 overlap |
| Pottawatomie | | 40.910 | 65.838 | K-63 north | Western end of K-63 overlap |
| Pottawatomie | | 41.736 | 67.168 | K-63 south | Eastern end of K-63 overlap |
| Jackson | | 47.753 | 76.851 | K-62 north | Southern terminus of K-62 |
| Jackson | | 53.745 | 86.494 | K-79 north | Southern terminus of K-79 |
| Jackson | Holton | 59.106 | 95.122 | US-75 (Arizona Avenue) / K-116 begins – Topeka | Western end of K-116 overlap; western terminus of K-116; US-75 serves Holton Community Hospital |
| Jackson | | 62.612 | 100.764 | K-116 east – Atchison | Eastern end of K-116 overlap |
| Jefferson | Valley Falls | 80.741 | 129.940 | K-4 south | Western end of K-4 overlap |
| Jefferson | Valley Falls | 81.543 | 131.231 | K-4 north | Eastern end of K-4 overlap |
| Jefferson | | 89.240 | 143.618 | US-59 north / K-192 east | Western end of US-59 overlap; western terminus of K-192 |
| Jefferson | Oskaloosa | 97.346 | 156.663 | K-92 west – Ozawkie | Western end of K-92 overlap |
| Jefferson | | 98.306 | 158.208 | US-59 south | Eastern end of US-59 overlap |
| Jefferson | McLouth | 104.217 | 167.721 | K-92 east (Union Street) – Leavenworth | Eastern end of K-92 overlap |
| Leavenworth | Tonganoxie | 114.460 | 184.206 | US-24 / US-40 (Chieftain Road) | Eastern terminus; road continues as 4th Street |
1.000 mi = 1.609 km; 1.000 km = 0.621 mi: Concurrency terminus

== See also ==
- List of state highways in Kansas
