= Jackson County, Kansas =

County in Kansas, United States

- County
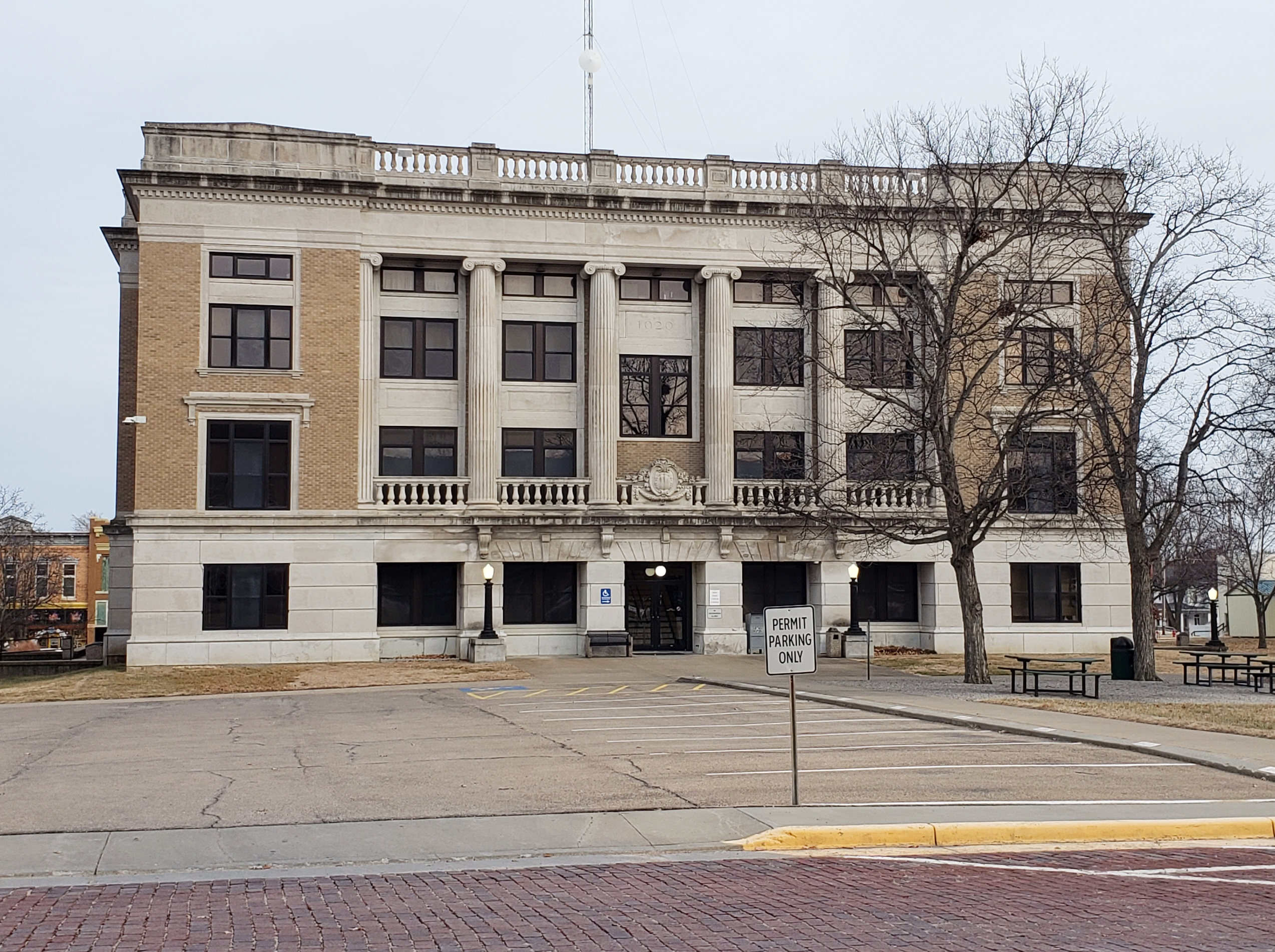
- Jackson County Courthouse in Holton (2023)

- Location within the U.S. state of Kansas
- Country: United States
- State: Kansas
- Founded: February 11, 1859
- Named for: Andrew Jackson
- Seat: Holton
- Largest city: Holton

Area
  - Total: 658 sq mi (1,700 km^{2})
  - Land: 656 sq mi (1,700 km^{2})
  - Water: 1.8 sq mi (4.7 km^{2}) 0.3%

Population (2020)
  - Total: 13,232
  - Estimate (2025): 13,438 ▲
  - Density: 20.2/sq mi (7.79/km^{2})
- Time zone: UTC−6 (Central)
  - Summer (DST): UTC−5 (CDT)
- Congressional districts: 1st, 2nd
- Website: jacksoncountyks.com

Jackson County is a county in the U.S. state of Kansas. Its county seat and most populous city is Holton. As of the 2020 census, the county population was 13,232. The county, first named Calhoun County for pro-slavery South Carolina Senator John C. Calhoun, was renamed in 1859 for President Andrew Jackson. The Prairie Band Potawatomi Indian Reservation, near the center of the county, comprises about 18.5% of the county's area.

== History ==
=== Early history ===
For many millennia, the Great Plains of North America was inhabited by nomadic Native Americans. From the 16th century to 18th century, the Kingdom of France claimed ownership of large parts of North America. In 1762, after the French and Indian War, France secretly ceded New France to Spain, per the Treaty of Fontainebleau.

=== 19th century ===
In 1802, Spain returned most of the land to France, but keeping title to about 7,500 sq mi (19,000 km^{2}). In 1803, most of the land for modern day Kansas was acquired by the United States from France as part of the 828,000 sq mi (2,140,000 km^{2}) Louisiana Purchase for 2.83 cents per acre.

In 1854, the Kansas Territory was organized, then in 1861 Kansas became the 34th U.S. state. In 1859, Jackson County was established.

== Geography ==
According to the U.S. Census Bureau, the county has an area of 658 square miles (1,700 km^{2}), of which 656 square miles (1,700 km^{2}) is land and 1.8 square miles (4.7 km^{2}) (0.3%) is water.

=== Adjacent counties ===
- Brown County (northeast)
- Atchison County (east)
- Jefferson County (southeast)
- Shawnee County (south)
- Pottawatomie County (west)
- Nemaha County (northwest)

== Demographics ==
Jackson County is included in the Topeka metropolitan area.

Historical population
Census	Pop.	Note	%±
1860	1,936		—
1870	6,053		212.7%
1880	10,718		77.1%
1890	14,626		36.5%
1900	17,117		17.0%
1910	16,861		−1.5%
1920	15,495		−8.1%
1930	14,776		−4.6%
1940	13,382		−9.4%
1950	11,098		−17.1%
1960	10,309		−7.1%
1970	10,342		0.3%
1980	11,644		12.6%
1990	11,525		−1.0%
2000	12,657		9.8%
2010	13,462		6.4%
2020	13,232		−1.7%
2025 (est.)	13,438	▲	1.6%
U.S. Decennial Census; 1790-1960 1900-1990; 1990-2000 2010-2020

Jackson County, Kansas – Racial composition
Race (NH = Non-Hispanic)	2020	2010	2000	1990	1980
White alone (NH)	79.6% (10,534)	85.9% (11,559)	89.6% (11,344)	92.6% (10,668)	94.4% (10,988)
Black alone (NH)	0.7% (95)	0.5% (69)	0.5% (66)	0.3% (39)	0.2% (19)
American Indian alone (NH)	8.3% (1,098)	7.2% (974)	6.5% (819)	5.9% (681)	4.5% (523)
Asian alone (NH)	0.2% (29)	0.4% (48)	0.2% (20)	0.1% (9)	0.1% (15)
Pacific Islander alone (NH)	0.1% (18)	0% (1)	0% (3)		
Other race alone (NH)	0.3% (37)	0% (6)	0% (2)	0% (2)	0% (0)
Multiracial (NH)	6% (791)	2.7% (367)	1.7% (214)	—	—
Hispanic/Latino (any race)	4.8% (630)	3.3% (438)	1.5% (189)	1.1% (126)	0.9% (99)

=== 2020 census ===
As of the 2020 census, the county had a population of 13,232, a median age of 41.3 years, 25.6% of residents under the age of 18, and 19.4% of residents 65 years of age or older.

For every 100 females there were 99.4 males and for every 100 females age 18 and over there were 96.7 males age 18 and over; 0.0% of residents lived in urban areas, while 100.0% lived in rural areas.

The racial makeup of the county was 81.1% White, 0.8% Black or African American, 9.2% American Indian and Alaska Native, 0.3% Asian, 0.1% Native Hawaiian and Pacific Islander, 1.2% from some other race, and 7.3% from two or more races. Hispanic or Latino residents of any race comprised 4.8% of the population.

There were 5,036 households in the county, of which 32.1% had children under the age of 18 living with them and 22.8% had a female householder with no spouse or partner present. About 26.2% of all households were made up of individuals and 13.4% had someone living alone who was 65 years of age or older.

There were 5,583 housing units, of which 9.8% were vacant. Among occupied housing units, 77.7% were owner-occupied and 22.3% were renter-occupied. The homeowner vacancy rate was 1.9% and the rental vacancy rate was 6.6%.

The most reported ancestries in 2020 were:

- German (28%)
- English (19.4%)
- Irish (16.1%)
- Prairie Band Potawatomi Nation (6.3%)
- Scottish (3%)
- Mexican (3%)
- Potawatomi (2.1%)
- Swedish (2.1%)
- French (2%)
- Dutch (1.6%)

=== 2000 census ===
As of the 2000 census, there were 12,657 people, 4,727 households, and 3,507 families residing in the county. The population density was 19 people per square mile (7.3 people/km^{2}). There were 5,094 housing units at an average density of 8 per square mile (3.1/km^{2}). The county's racial makeup was 90.21% White, 6.84% Native American, 0.53% Black or African American, 0.17% Asian, 0.02% Pacific Islander, 0.39% from other races, and 1.84% from two or more races. Hispanic or Latino of any race were 1.49% of the population.

There were 4,727 households, of which 35.20% had children under the age of 18 living with them, 62.30% were married couples living together, 8.20% had a female householder with no husband present, and 25.80% were non-families. 22.70% of all households were made up of individuals, and 11.50% had someone living alone who was 65 years of age or older. The average household size was 2.63 and the average family size was 3.09.

28.30% of the county's residents were under the age of 18, 6.80% were from 18 to 24, 26.70% were from 25 to 44, 23.40% were from 45 to 64, and 14.90% were 65 years of age or older. The median age was 37 years. For every 100 females, there were 96.80 males. For every 100 females age 18 and over, there were 93.80 males.

The county's median household income was $40,451, and the median family income was $46,520. Males had a median income of $32,195 versus $22,305 for females. The county's per capita income was $18,606. About 6.40% of families and 8.80% of the population were below the poverty line, including 12.50% of those under age 18 and 9.20% of those age 65 or over.

== Government ==
=== Presidential elections ===
Jackson County has supported the Republican Party candidate in every presidential election from 1936 onward. Democratic Party candidates for president have only won the county twice since 1880, in 1912 & 1932.

Presidential election results

United States presidential election results for Jackson County, Kansas
Year	Republican		Democratic		Third party(ies)	
Year	No.	%	No.	%	No.	%
1888	1,979	59.90%	1,220	36.92%	105	3.18%
1892	1,825	52.93%	0	0.00%	1,623	47.07%
1896	2,158	52.05%	1,955	47.15%	33	0.80%
1900	2,291	56.17%	1,745	42.78%	43	1.05%
1904	2,547	70.03%	919	25.27%	171	4.70%
1908	2,201	58.65%	1,494	39.81%	58	1.55%
1912	1,027	26.18%	1,565	39.89%	1,331	33.93%
1916	3,451	53.43%	2,914	45.12%	94	1.46%
1920	3,753	70.20%	1,562	29.22%	31	0.58%
1924	4,391	71.09%	1,419	22.97%	367	5.94%
1928	4,811	74.55%	1,602	24.83%	40	0.62%
1932	3,271	48.11%	3,442	50.63%	86	1.26%
1936	3,680	52.88%	3,265	46.92%	14	0.20%
1940	4,306	63.92%	2,397	35.58%	34	0.50%
1944	3,665	69.72%	1,567	29.81%	25	0.48%
1948	3,166	61.30%	1,958	37.91%	41	0.79%
1952	4,161	75.28%	1,358	24.57%	8	0.14%
1956	3,469	71.72%	1,356	28.03%	12	0.25%
1960	3,279	67.46%	1,567	32.24%	15	0.31%
1964	2,334	53.83%	1,971	45.46%	31	0.71%
1968	2,678	60.71%	1,225	27.77%	508	11.52%
1972	3,363	71.98%	1,191	25.49%	118	2.53%
1976	2,725	54.85%	2,129	42.85%	114	2.29%
1980	3,211	63.33%	1,537	30.32%	322	6.35%
1984	3,466	66.92%	1,667	32.19%	46	0.89%
1988	2,759	54.36%	2,261	44.55%	55	1.08%
1992	1,970	35.48%	1,639	29.52%	1,943	35.00%
1996	2,682	49.12%	1,983	36.32%	795	14.56%
2000	3,001	57.16%	1,990	37.90%	259	4.93%
2004	3,730	63.35%	2,064	35.05%	94	1.60%
2008	3,811	60.95%	2,308	36.91%	134	2.14%
2012	3,527	63.42%	1,901	34.18%	133	2.39%
2016	3,939	67.70%	1,512	25.99%	367	6.31%
2020	4,517	68.61%	1,881	28.57%	186	2.83%
2024	4,557	70.39%	1,799	27.79%	118	1.82%

=== Laws ===
Following an amendment to the Kansas Constitution in 1986, the county remained a prohibition, or "dry", county until 2004, when voters approved the sale of alcoholic liquor by the individual drink with a 30% food sales requirement. The food sales requirement was removed in 2020.

The county voted "No" on the 2022 Kansas abortion referendum, an anti-abortion ballot measure, by 52% to 48% despite backing Donald Trump with 69% of the vote to Joe Biden's 29% in the 2020 presidential election.

== Education ==
=== Unified school districts ===
- Jackson Heights USD 335
- Holton USD 336
- Royal Valley USD 337

== Communities ==
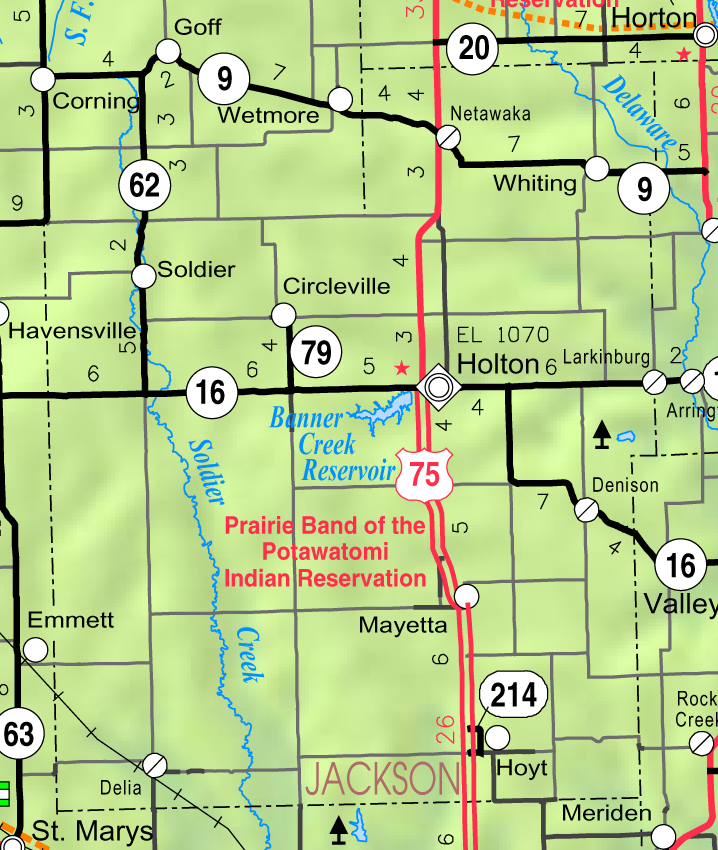
2005 map of Jackson County (map legend)

List of townships / incorporated cities / unincorporated communities / extinct former communities within Jackson County.

=== Cities ===
- Circleville
- Delia
- Denison
- Holton (county seat)
- Hoyt
- Mayetta
- Netawaka
- Soldier
- Whiting

=== Unincorporated communities ===
‡ means a community has portions in an adjacent county.

- Birmingham
- Larkinburg‡

=== Indian reservations ===
- Kickapoo Reservation‡
- Prairie Band Potawatomi Indian Reservation

=== Townships ===
Jackson County is divided into fifteen townships. The city of Holton is considered governmentally independent and is excluded from the census figures for the townships. In the following table, the population center is the largest city (or cities) included in that township's population total, if it is of a significant size.

Township	FIPS	Population center	Population	Population density /km^{2} (/sq mi)	Land area km^{2} (sq mi)	Water area km^{2} (sq mi)	Water %	Geographic coordinates
Adrian	00350		150	2 (5)	77 (30)	0 (0)	0.25%	39°21′17″N 95°59′43″W
Banner	04025		300	3 (8)	93 (36)	1 (0)	0.70%	39°26′5″N 95°50′25″W
Cedar	11275		1,254	12 (31)	103 (40)	0 (0)	0.03%	39°20′53″N 95°40′44″W
Douglas	18350		2,135	13 (33)	168 (65)	0 (0)	0.07%	39°15′34″N 95°41′2″W
Franklin	24400		776	9 (24)	84 (32)	3 (1)	3.28%	39°26′41″N 95°44′35″W
Garfield	25625		624	7 (18)	88 (34)	0 (0)	0.49%	39°25′35″N 95°38′9″W
Grant	27700		212	2 (5)	109 (42)	0 (0)	0.10%	39°26′47″N 95°58′14″W
Jefferson	35225		494	5 (14)	94 (36)	0 (0)	0.12%	39°31′0″N 95°50′38″W
Liberty	40125		513	6 (15)	92 (35)	0 (0)	0.16%	39°31′3″N 95°44′36″W
Lincoln	40750		1,046	4 (11)	255 (98)	0 (0)	0.05%	39°19′40″N 95°50′26″W
Netawaka	49975		361	4 (10)	93 (36)	0 (0)	0.13%	39°36′42″N 95°43′47″W
Soldier	66200		403	4 (9)	110 (43)	0 (0)	0.17%	39°31′22″N 95°58′27″W
Straight Creek	68475		158	2 (4)	95 (37)	0 (0)	0.30%	39°31′24″N 95°37′0″W
Washington	75625		516	4 (10)	139 (54)	0 (0)	0.13%	39°15′5″N 95°58′1″W
Whiting	78125		362	4 (10)	93 (36)	0 (0)	0.11%	39°36′4″N 95°36′57″W
Sources: "Census 2000 U.S. Gazetteer Files". U.S. Census Bureau, Geography Division. Archived from the original on August 2, 2002.

== See also ==
- National Register of Historic Places listings in Jackson County, Kansas

Community information for Kansas

- Kansas locations by per capita income
- List of counties in Kansas
- List of townships in Kansas
- List of cities in Kansas
- List of unincorporated communities in Kansas
- List of ghost towns in Kansas
