= Cummings, Kansas =

- Unincorporated community
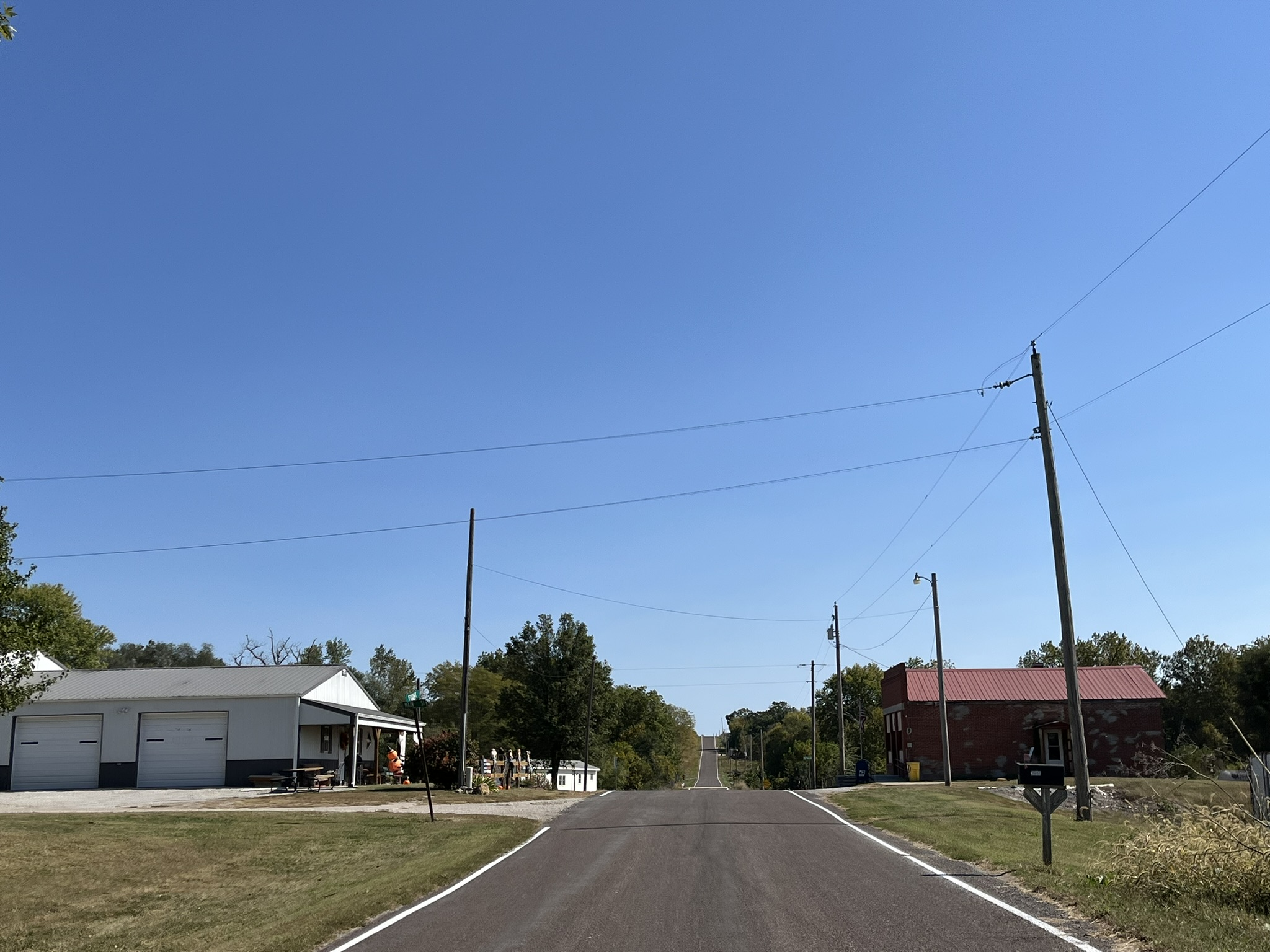
- Front Street (2024)

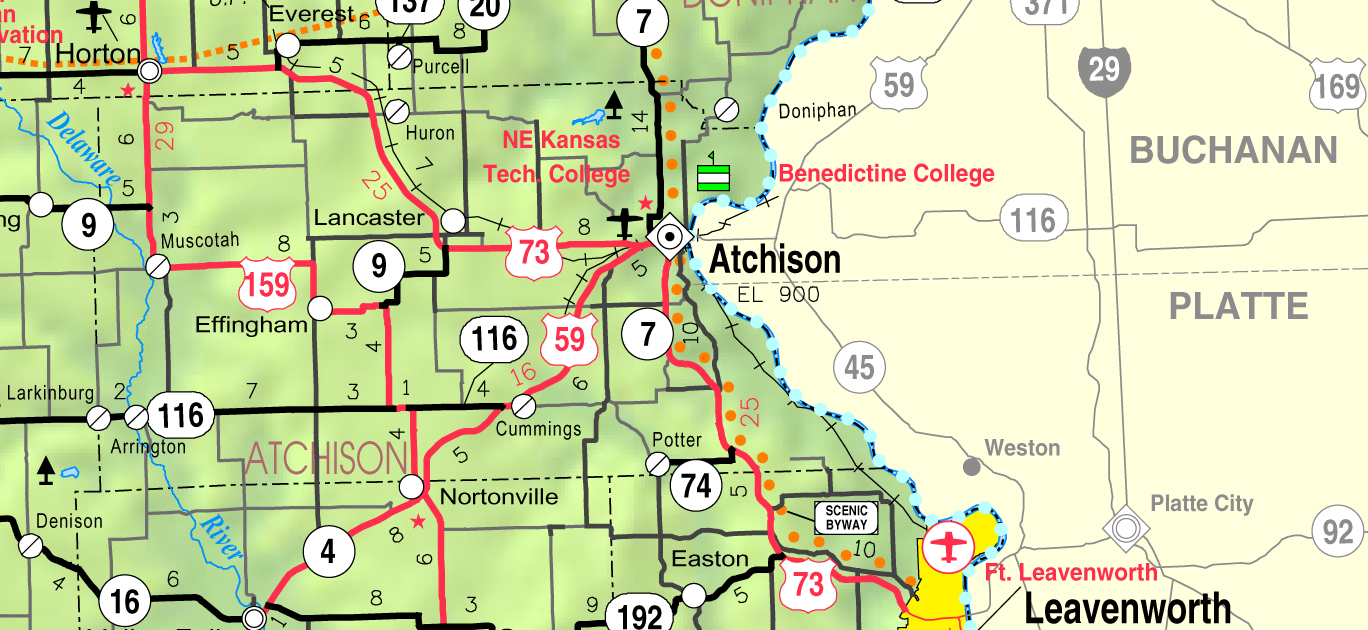
- KDOT map of Atchison County (legend)
- Coordinates: 39°27′46″N 95°14′51″W
- Country: United States
- State: Kansas
- County: Atchison
- Township: Center
- Platted: 1883
- Named for: William Cummings
- Elevation: 991 ft (302 m)
- Time zone: UTC-6 (CST)
  - Summer (DST): UTC-5 (CDT)
- ZIP Code: 66016
- Area code: 913
- FIPS code: 20-16750
- GNIS ID: 478259

Cummings is an unincorporated community in Center Township, Atchison County, Kansas, United States. Cummings is 9.5 miles (15.3 km) southwest of Atchison.

== History ==
Cummings (formerly Cummingsville) was platted in 1883. It was named for its founder, William Cummings.

Cummings has a post office with ZIP Code 66016.
