= 103.9 FM =

FM radio frequency

The following radio stations broadcast on FM frequency 103.9 MHz:

== Albania ==
- BBC World Service in Tirana

== Argentina ==
- LRI319 del Rosario in Rosario, Santa Fe
- Radio María in Sauce, Corrientes

== Australia ==
- ABC Classic in Adelaide, South Australia
- Good News Radio in Ballarat, Victoria
- 3GCB in Latrobe Valley
- 3SEY Seymour, Central Victoria

== Canada (Channel 280) ==
- CBAF-FM-13 in Chéticamp, Nova Scotia
- CBBP-FM in Peterborough, Ontario
- CBRQ-FM in Lake Louise, Alberta (formerly VF2105)
- CBRF-FM in Calgary, Alberta
- CBTM-FM in Masset, British Columbia
- CFCK-FM in Canoe Lake, Saskatchewan
- CFFD-FM in Laforge-2, Quebec
- CFIN-FM-1 in Armagh, Quebec
- CFJH-FM in Burns Lake, British Columbia
- CFQM-FM in Moncton, New Brunswick
- CHNO-FM in Sudbury, Ontario
- CHOA-FM-2 in La Sarre, Quebec
- CHOK-1-FM in Sarnia, Ontario
- CHVO-FM in Carbonear, Newfoundland and Labrador
- CIFM-FM-3 in Merritt, British Columbia
- CIME-FM in St-Jerome, Quebec
- CIMS-FM in Campbellton, New Brunswick
- CISN-FM in Edmonton, Alberta
- CJAW-FM in Moose Jaw, Saskatchewan
- CJBC-FM-1 in Windsor, Ontario
- CKOV-FM in Kelowna, British Columbia
- CKDK-FM in Woodstock, Ontario
- CKWE-FM in Maniwaki, Quebec
- CKXX-FM in Corner Brook, Newfoundland and Labrador
- VF2015 in Chetwynd, British Columbia
- VF2103 in Fort St. James, British Columbia
- VF2155 in Poste Laverendrye, Quebec
- VF2294 in Rainbow Lake, Alberta
- VF2371 in Kemess Mine Site, British Columbia
- VF2377 in Campbell Road, British Columbia

== China ==
- Beijing Traffic Radio in Beijing
- CNR Music Radio in Yuxi
- CNR The Voice of China in Daqing and Shaoxing
- CRI News Radio in Changsha (stopped airing in 2016)
- Mexican Radio in Meixian, Meizhou

== Colombia ==
- La X (HJG54) in Medellín, Antioquía
- La X (HJVU) in Bogotá, Cundinamarca

== Mexico ==
- XHCA-FM in El Barrio Lagunas, Oaxaca
- XHDQ-FM in San Andrés Tuxtla, Veracruz
- XHESC-FM in Escárcega, Campeche
- XHESOL-FM in El Jaral (Cd. Hidalgo), Michoacán
- XHEWA-FM in San Luis Potosí, San Luis Potosí
- XHEZM-FM in Zamora, Michoacán
- XHLD-FM in Autlán de Navarro, Jalisco
- XHMTS-FM in Tampico, Tamaulipas
- XHPEC-FM in San Bartolo Tutotepec, Hidalgo
- XHPJAL-FM in Jalpa, Zacatecas
- XHPO-FM in Acapulco, Guerrero
- XHRF-FM in Ciudad Acuña, Coahuila
- XHRUY-FM in Mérida, Yucatán
- XHSFJ-FM in San Felipe Jalapa de Díaz, Oaxaca
- XHURS-FM in Ures, Sonora
- XHVF-FM in Villaflores, Chiapas

== Philippines ==
- DWHB-FM in Baguio City
- DWVM in Lucena City
- DWAR-FM in Puerto Princesa City
- DWOP in Naga City
- DYSF in Naval, Biliran
- DYRR in Pinamungajan, Cebu
- DXFO in Cagayan de Oro City
- DXLK in General Santos City
- DXAP in Butuan City
- Juander Radyo in Tandag City

== United Kingdom ==
- BBC Radio 4 in Rostrevor Forest and Kilkeel
- BBC Radio Cornwall (Redruth)

== United States (Channel 280) ==
- KAAJ-LP in Monticello, Utah
- KBAV-LP in Coos Bay, Oregon
- KBBD in Spokane, Washington
- KBDS in Taft, California
- KBGZ in Spring Creek, Nevada
- KBHL in Osakis, Minnesota
- KBQQ in Smiley, Texas
- KCNU in Silver City, Idaho
- KCXX in Comanche, Texas
- KDFG in Seaside, California
- KDJK in Mariposa, California
- KDKI-LP in Twin Falls, Idaho
- KDOC-FM in Eyota, Minnesota
- KERL in Earle, Arkansas
- KFFI-LP in Boise, Idaho
- KGBB in Edwards, California
- KGCC in Gillette, Wyoming
- KGNT in Smithfield, Utah
- KGRT-FM in Las Cruces, New Mexico
- KHTI in Lake Arrowhead, California
- KHYM in Copeland, Kansas
- KIDD in Fort Mohave, Arizona
- KJJS in Zapata, Texas
- KKIX in Fayetteville, Arkansas
- KLPH-LP in Alliance, Nebraska
- KLVB in Lincoln, California
- KMCR in Montgomery City, Missouri
- KMHT in Marshall, Texas
- KMIS-FM in Gideon, Missouri
- KMSM-FM in Butte, Montana
- KMVA in Gilbert, Arizona
- KNLV-FM in Ord, Nebraska
- KNUQ in Paauilo, Hawaii
- KNZA in Hiawatha, Kansas
- KOMB in Fort Scott, Kansas
- KOSG in Pawhuska, Oklahoma
- KPGG in Ashdown, Arkansas
- KQHK in McCook, Nebraska
- KQXC-FM in Wichita Falls, Texas
- KRCD (FM) in Inglewood, California
- KRFS-FM in Superior, Nebraska
- KRIA in Plainview, Texas
- KRKA in Severance, Colorado
- KRLI in Malta Bend, Missouri
- KRXP in Pueblo West, Colorado
- KSNO in Snowmass Village, Colorado
- KSVM-LP in Walla Walla, Washington
- KSYC in Yreka, California
- KTDZ in College, Alaska
- KTHP in Hemphill, Texas
- KTNX (FM) in Arcadia, Missouri
- KUOO in Spirit Lake, Iowa
- KVAS-FM in Ilwaco, Washington
- KVLX in Franklin, Texas
- KWGF in Vaughn, Montana
- KZMI in Garapan-Saipan, Northern Mariana Islands
- KZMN in Kalispell, Montana
- KZTK in Arthur, North Dakota
- WAIP-LP in Gulfport, Mississippi
- WANC in Ticonderoga, New York
- WAWY in Dundee, Illinois
- WBZX in Big Rapids, Michigan
- WCLD-FM in Cleveland, Mississippi
- WCMW in Harbor Springs, Michigan
- WCNM in Hazlet, New Jersey
- WCOP in Eldred, Pennsylvania
- WDBT in Fort Rucker, Alabama
- WDDK in Greensboro, Georgia
- WDEB-FM in Jamestown, Tennessee
- WDKX in Rochester, New York
- WDPT-LP in Panama City, Florida
- WEWZ-LP in Waycross, Georgia
- WFTP-LP in Fort Payne, Alabama
- WGLH in Hawkinsville, Georgia
- WGMF-FM in Laporte, Pennsylvania
- WHQV-LP in Hendersonville, Tennessee
- WHXT in Orangeburg, South Carolina
- WIAF-LP in Antioch, Tennessee
- WIMC in Crawfordsville, Indiana
- WJKR in Worthington, Ohio
- WJOE in Vienna, West Virginia
- WJUP-LP in Jupiter, Florida
- WKHV-LP in Kingston, New York
- WKPE in South Yarmouth, Massachusetts
- WLCV-LP in Ludington, Michigan
- WLEN in Adrian, Michigan
- WLFM in Lawrenceburg, Tennessee
- WLSW in Scottdale, Pennsylvania
- WLTD-LP in Dickson, Tennessee
- WLYH-FM in Big Island, Virginia
- WNNL in Fuquay-Varina, North Carolina
- WNOA-LP in Marquette, Michigan
- WNOI in Flora, Illinois
- WOZO-LP in Knoxville, Tennessee
- WOZW-LP in Knoxville, Tennessee
- WPBZ-FM in Rensselaer, New York
- WPPL in Blue Ridge, Georgia
- WPHI in Jenkintown, Pennsylvania
- WQCY in Quincy, Illinois
- WQJZ-LP in Murfreesboro, Tennessee
- WQWY in Bellwood, Pennsylvania
- WRBI in Batesville, Indiana
- WRBR-FM in South Bend, Indiana
- WRCN in Riverhead, New York
- WRDE-FM in Berlin, Maryland
- WRFM in Drakesboro, Kentucky
- WRKA in Louisville, Kentucky
- WRSR in Owosso, Michigan
- WSEN in Mexico, New York
- WSHP-FM in Easley, South Carolina
- WSRK in Oneonta, New York
- WSWD-LP in Tifton, Georgia
- WTLP in Braddock Heights, Maryland
- WTPN in Westby, Wisconsin
- WTYB in Bluffton, South Carolina
- WVBN in Bronxville, New York
- WVBO in Winneconne, Wisconsin
- WVOM-FM in Howland, Maine
- WWEL in London, Kentucky
- WWEO-LP in DeFuniak Springs, Florida
- WWFW in Fort Wayne, Indiana
- WWIZ in West Middlesex, Pennsylvania
- WWKZ in Okolona, Mississippi
- WWND-LP in White Stone, Virginia
- WXAN in Ava, Illinois
- WXIS in Erwin, Tennessee
- WXKB in Cape Coral, Florida
- WXKQ-FM in Whitesburg, Kentucky
- WXRD in Crown Point, Indiana
- WYAB in Pocahontas, Mississippi
- WYFT in Luray, Virginia
- WZDA in Beavercreek, Ohio
