= KCNM =

KCNM may refer to:

- KCNM (AM), a defunct radio station (1080 AM) licensed to Saipan, Northern Mariana Islands
- KNUT, a radio station (101.1 FM) licensed to Garapan-Saipan, Northern Mariana Islands, which held the call sign KCNM-FM from 1999 to 2010
- the ICAO code for Cavern City Air Terminal
