= KLZA =

- Falls City, Nebraska; United States
- Frequency: 101.3 MHz
- Branding: Sunny 101.3

Programming
- Format: Adult contemporary
- Affiliations: Fox News Radio

Ownership
- Owner: KNZA, Inc.
- Sister stations: KAIR-FM; KMZA; KNZA; KOZA; KTNC

History
- First air date: 1998
- Call sign meaning: Similar to KNZA

Technical information
- Licensing authority: FCC
- Facility ID: 35286
- Class: C3
- ERP: 25,000 watts
- HAAT: 100 meters (330 ft)
- Transmitter coordinates: 40°6′54″N 95°39′6″W

Links
- Public license information: Public file; LMS
- Webcast: Listen live
- Website: www.sunny1013.com

KLZA (101.3 FM, "Sunny 101.3") is a radio station licensed to serve Falls City, Nebraska, United States. The station is owned by KNZA, Inc.

KLZA broadcasts an adult contemporary music format.

== History ==
This station received its original construction permit from the Federal Communications Commission (FCC) on March 6, 1997. The new station was assigned the KLZA call sign by the FCC on April 11, 1997. KLZA received its license to cover from the FCC on October 16, 1998.
