= Muscotah, Kansas =

- City
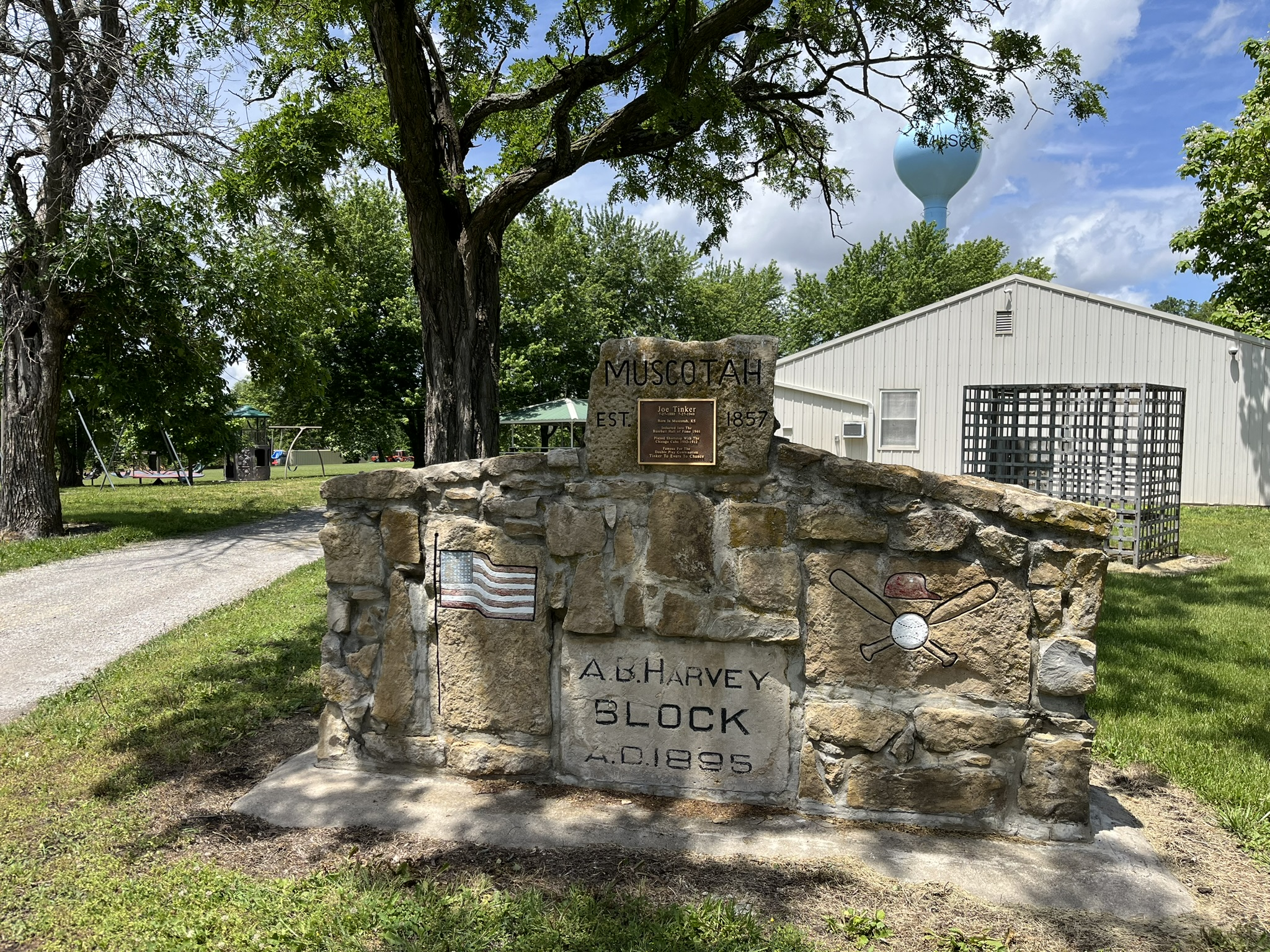
- Muscotah Park with old city jail in foreground (2024)

- Location within Atchison County and Kansas

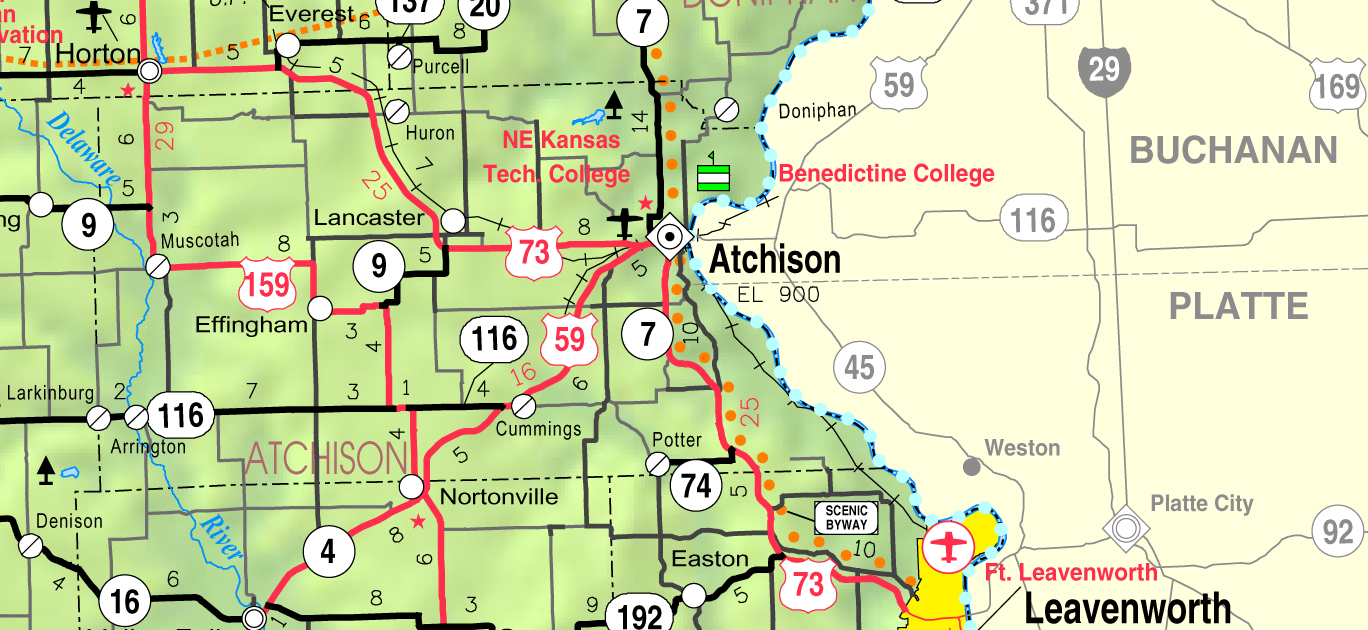
- KDOT map of Atchison County (legend)
- Coordinates: 39°33′13″N 95°31′14″W
- Country: United States
- State: Kansas
- County: Atchison
- Township: Grasshopper
- Platted: 1857

Government
  - Type: Mayor–Council
  - Mayor: Brian Higley

Area
  - Total: 0.33 sq mi (0.86 km^{2})
  - Land: 0.33 sq mi (0.86 km^{2})
  - Water: 0 sq mi (0.00 km^{2})
- Elevation: 1,014 ft (309 m)

Population (2020)
  - Total: 155
  - Density: 470/sq mi (180/km^{2})
- Time zone: UTC−6 (CST)
  - Summer (DST): UTC−5 (CDT)
- ZIP Code: 66058
- Area code: 785
- FIPS code: 20-49325
- GNIS ID: 2395144

Muscotah is a city in Grasshopper Township, Atchison County, Kansas, United States. As of the 2020 census, the population of the city was 155. Muscotah was named after the Kickapoo Native American word for "prairie".

== History ==
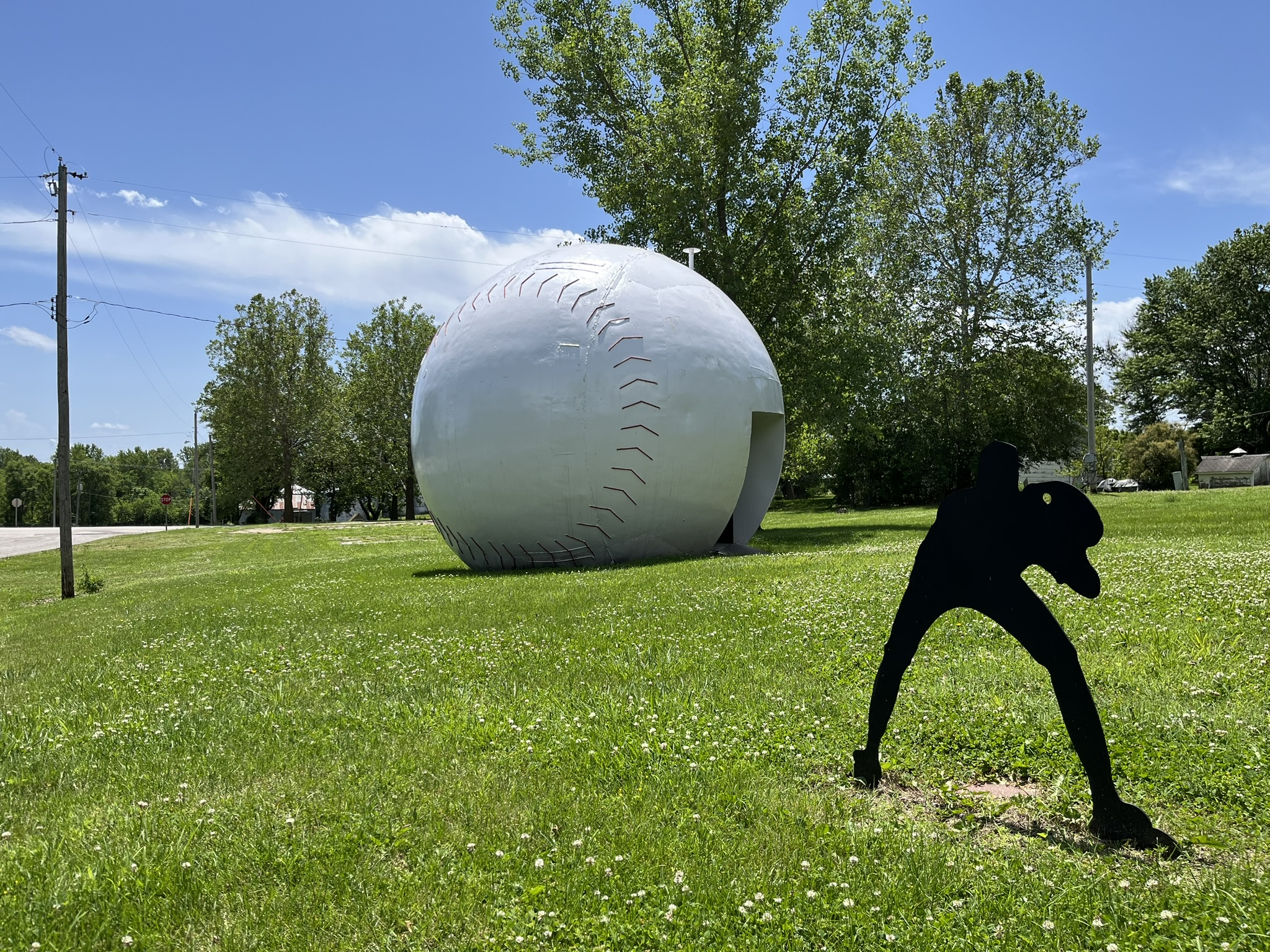
Muscotah Baseball Sculpture

Muscotah was platted in 1857. The original location of the town was about two and a half miles northeast of the current location of the town. Soon after the town was founded in its original location, it was determined that the Central Branch Union Pacific Railroad line would pass just to the south, so a new town was built on the railroad line near the Delaware River.

In 2013, the former water tower tank was converted into the World's Largest Baseball Sculpture in memory of Joe Tinker.

== Geography ==
According to the United States Census Bureau, the city has a total area of 0.34 square miles (0.88 km^{2}), all land.

== Demographics ==
Historical population
Census	Pop.	Note	%±
1880	412		—
1890	524		27.2%
1900	462		−11.8%
1910	491		6.3%
1920	427		−13.0%
1930	366		−14.3%
1940	331		−9.6%
1950	248		−25.1%
1960	228		−8.1%
1970	206		−9.6%
1980	248		20.4%
1990	194		−21.8%
2000	200		3.1%
2010	176		−12.0%
2020	155		−11.9%
U.S. Decennial Census

=== 2020 census ===
The 2020 United States census counted 155 people, 58 households, and 40 families in Muscotah. The population density was 465.5 per square mile (179.7/km^{2}). There were 72 housing units at an average density of 216.2 per square mile (83.5/km^{2}). The racial makeup was 92.26% (143) white or European American (92.26% non-Hispanic white), 0.0% (0) black or African-American, 0.65% (1) Native American or Alaska Native, 0.0% (0) Asian, 0.0% (0) Pacific Islander or Native Hawaiian, 3.23% (5) from other races, and 3.87% (6) from two or more races. Hispanic or Latino of any race was 1.94% (3) of the population.

Of the 58 households, 36.2% had children under the age of 18; 51.7% were married couples living together; 19.0% had a female householder with no spouse or partner present. 25.9% of households consisted of individuals and 10.3% had someone living alone who was 65 years of age or older. The average household size was 2.0 and the average family size was 2.7. The percent of those with a bachelor's degree or higher was estimated to be 6.5% of the population.

28.4% of the population was under the age of 18, 2.6% from 18 to 24, 12.3% from 25 to 44, 37.4% from 45 to 64, and 19.4% who were 65 years of age or older. The median age was 50.4 years. For every 100 females, there were 74.2 males. For every 100 females ages 18 and older, there were 73.4 males.

The 2016–2020 5-year American Community Survey estimates show that the median household income was $51,250 (with a margin of error of +/- $32,412) and the median family income was $68,500 (+/- $6,702). Males had a median income of $32,750 (+/- $7,905) versus $28,056 (+/- $2,704) for females. The median income for those above 16 years old was $30,694 (+/- $2,639). Approximately, 6.5% of families and 7.5% of the population were below the poverty line, including 0.0% of those under the age of 18 and 8.1% of those ages 65 or over.

=== 2010 census ===
As of the census of 2010, there were 176 people, 69 households, and 46 families residing in the city. The population density was 517.6 inhabitants per square mile (199.8/km^{2}). There were 90 housing units at an average density of 264.7 per square mile (102.2/km^{2}). The racial makeup of the city was 99.4% White and 0.6% from two or more races. Hispanic or Latino of any race were 3.4% of the population.

There were 69 households, of which 31.9% had children under the age of 18 living with them, 44.9% were married couples living together, 13.0% had a female householder with no husband present, 8.7% had a male householder with no wife present, and 33.3% were non-families. 27.5% of all households were made up of individuals, and 11.6% had someone living alone who was 65 years of age or older. The average household size was 2.55 and the average family size was 3.11.

The median age in the city was 36.3 years. 26.7% of residents were under the age of 18; 5.7% were between the ages of 18 and 24; 28.4% were from 25 to 44; 23.3% were from 45 to 64; and 15.9% were 65 years of age or older. The gender makeup of the city was 52.3% male and 47.7% female.

== Government ==
The Muscotah government consists of a mayor and five council members. The council meets the 2nd Monday of each month at 7PM.

- City Hall, 604 Kansas Ave.

== Education ==
Muscotah Schools operated for over 130 years. The final class of Muscotah High School graduated in 1939. It was reduced to 8th grade, then later to 6th grade. The Muscotah Grade School closed in 1990. The school mascot was the Mustangs and the colors were red and white. Muscotah students currently attend Atchison County USD 377 public schools in the city of Effingham.

== Notable people ==
- E.K. Gaylord (1873-1974), longtime owner of The Daily Oklahoman newspaper; born on a farm near Muscotah.
- Joe Tinker (1880-1948), Major League Baseball player for the Chicago Cubs and Cincinnati Reds. Playing shortstop for the Cubs, Tinker was part of the famous trio, "Tinker to Evers to Chance." He was elected to the National Baseball Hall of Fame in 1946. A monument in the Muscotah city park honors Tinker.

== See also ==
- Central Branch Union Pacific Railroad
