= XHESOL-FM =

Radio station in Ciudad Hidalgo, Michoacán, Mexico

- Ciudad Hidalgo, Michoacán; Mexico
- Frequency: 103.9 FM
- Branding: Sol FM

Programming
- Format: Regional Mexican

Ownership
- Owner: Medios Radiofónicos Michoacán; (Radio Sol, S.A. de C.V.)
- Sister stations: XHCHM-FM

History
- First air date: July 13, 1967 (concession); 2011 (FM)
- Call sign meaning: Sol

Technical information
- ERP: 25 kW
- HAAT: -159.1 meters
- Transmitter coordinates: 19°42′16″N 100°32′28″W

Links
- Webcast: Listen live
- Website: radio-mejor.com

XHESOL-FM is a radio station on 103.9 FM in Ciudad Hidalgo, Michoacán. XHESOL is owned by Medios Radiofónicos Michoacán and carries a Regional Mexican format known as Sol FM.

== History ==
XHESOL began as XESOL-AM 1190, which was owned by Maximiliano García Tellez. It was moved to FM in 2011.
