= KAIR-FM =

- Horton, Kansas; United States
- Broadcast area: Atchison; St. Joseph, Missouri; Northwest part of Kansas City Metro
- Frequency: 93.7 MHz

Programming
- Format: Country music
- Affiliations: Fox News Radio

Ownership
- Owner: KNZA Inc.
- Sister stations: KLZA, KMZA, KNZA, KOZA, KTNC

History
- First air date: 1993
- Former call signs: KADF (1993–1994); KERE-FM (1994–1996)

Technical information
- Licensing authority: FCC
- Facility ID: 33397
- Class: C3
- ERP: 25,000 watts
- HAAT: 100.0 meters (328.1 ft)
- Transmitter coordinates: 39°37′43″N 95°18′53″W

Links
- Public license information: Public file; LMS
- Webcast: Listen live
- Website: www.kairfm.com

Predecessor station
- KAIR
- Atchison, Kansas; United States
- Frequency: 1470 kHz

History
- First air date: 1939
- Last air date: April 17, 2019
- Former call signs: KVAK (1939–1950); KARE (1950–1986); KERE (1986–1996)

Technical information
- Facility ID: 33398
- Class: B
- Power: 1,000 watts
- Transmitter coordinates: 39°37′9″N 94°59′27″W

KAIR-FM (93.7 MHz) is a radio station broadcasting a country music format. Licensed to Horton, Kansas, United States, the station is currently owned by KNZA Inc. and features locally originating programming from its studio in Atchison, Kansas.

== Programming ==
A three-hour local morning show is broadcast from 6:00 am until 9:00 am Monday through Friday, and includes such content as local news, sports, and weather reports. The news is locally originated, with an emphasis on the coverage area of northeast Kansas and northwest Missouri. The content is shared with the other stations in the corporate group and posted online at mscnews.net. Sports includes an emphasis on local and regional high school and college teams, including providing play-by-play of local athletic competitions.

== KAIR-FM history ==
The station was assigned call sign KADF on June 9, 1993. On October 31, 1994, the station changed its call sign to KERE-FM, and on August 19, 1996 to KAIR-FM.

== KAIR (AM) history ==
The license for KAIR (1470 AM) was cancelled by the Federal Communications Commission on April 17, 2019.
