= KUSG =

KUSG may refer to:

- KUSG (AM), a radio station (1350 AM) licensed to serve Agana, Guam
- KMYU, a television station (channel 9, virtual 12) licensed to serve St. George, Utah, United States
