= KTNC (AM) =

Radio station in Falls City, Nebraska, United States

- Falls City, Nebraska; United States
- Frequency: 1230 kHz
- Branding: Oldies 1230

Programming
- Format: Oldies
- Affiliations: Fox News Radio

Ownership
- Owner: KNZA Inc.
- Sister stations: KAIR-FM, KLZA, KMZA, KNZA, KOZA

History
- First air date: August 3, 1957

Technical information
- Licensing authority: FCC
- Facility ID: 8081
- Class: C
- Power: 500 watts day; 1,000 watts night
- Transmitter coordinates: 40°3′57.00″N 95°36′55.00″W
- Translator: 107.1 K296HK (Falls City)

Links
- Public license information: Public file; LMS
- Webcast: Listen Live
- Website: KTNC Online

KTNC (1230 MHz) is an AM radio station broadcasting an oldies music format. Licensed to Falls City, Nebraska, United States, the station is currently owned by KNZA Inc. and features programming from Fox News Radio.
