= Port William =

Port William may refer to several places:

- Port William, Falkland Islands, an inlet in the Falkland Islands
- Port William, New Zealand, an inlet on Stewart Island
- Port William, Dumfries and Galloway, a fishing village in Scotland
- Port William, Ohio, a village in the U.S. state of Ohio
- Port William, Kentucky, a fictional location in the writing of Wendell Berry

== See also ==
- Port Williams (disambiguation)
- Puerto Williams
