= Shannon, Kansas =

Unincorporated community in Kansas, U.S.

Coordinates: 39°33′55″N 95°14′36″W

Shannon is an unincorporated community in Atchison County, Kansas, United States.

== History ==
Shannon was platted in 1883.

A post office was opened in Shannon in 1882, and remained in operation until it was discontinued in 1941.

== See also ==
- Shannon Township, Atchison County, Kansas
