= KAIR =

KAIR may refer to:

- KAIR-FM, a radio station (93.7 FM) licensed to Horton, Kansas
- KAIR (AM), a former radio station (1470 AM) licensed to Atchison, Kansas, United States, which was deleted in 2019
- KFFN, a radio station (1490 AM) licensed to serve Tucson, Arizona, United States, which held the call sign KAIR from 1956 to 1989
