= ACCHS =

ACCHS may refer to:

- Aboriginal community-controlled health services, modelled on AMS Redfern in Sydney, Australia
- Allentown Central Catholic High School, located in Allentown, Pennsylvania
- Atchison County Community High School, located in Effingham, Kansas
