= KNZA =

Radio station in Hiawatha, Kansas

Coordinates: 39.578°N 95.563°W

- Hiawatha, Kansas; United States
- Frequency: 103.9 MHz
- Branding: KanzaLand Country

Programming
- Format: Country
- Affiliations: Fox News Radio; Kansas State Wildcats

Ownership
- Owner: MSC Radio Group; (KNZA, Inc.)
- Sister stations: KAIR-FM; KLZA; KMZA; KOZA; KTNC

History
- First air date: 1977
- Call sign meaning: Kansas

Technical information
- Licensing authority: FCC
- Facility ID: 35285
- Class: C2
- ERP: 50,000 watts
- HAAT: 150 meters (490 ft)

Links
- Public license information: Public file; LMS
- Webcast: Listen live
- Website: www.knzafm.com

KNZA (103.9 FM) is a commercial radio station in Hiawatha, Kansas. The station broadcasts with 50,000 watts effective radiated power from a 584-foot tower giving it a strong signal throughout Northeast Kansas.

== History ==
KNZA was originally built by Mike Carter in 1977, in a field 6 miles (9.7 km) south of Hiawatha, Kansas. Carter and his staff stressed personalized rapport with the listening audience, with a country music and farm information format, and quickly built a faithful audience at a time when few cars or homes had FM radios. The station placed heavy emphasis in community involvement, broadcasting the play by play of as many as 100 regional high school football and basketball games every year.

In 1985, Carter sold his interest in KNZA to two employees, Gregory Buser and Robert Hilton, who operated with the same successful philosophy.

In 2021, Justin Fluke purchased KNZA Inc. from Hilton and Buser. The company, including the five sister stations (KNZA, KMZA, KAIR-FM, KLZA, and KTNC) and its two websites, continue to focus on local news and weather, local and regional sports coverage and providing an affordable advertising options for local businesses in its coverage area.
