= Atchison County, Kansas =

County in Kansas, United States

- County
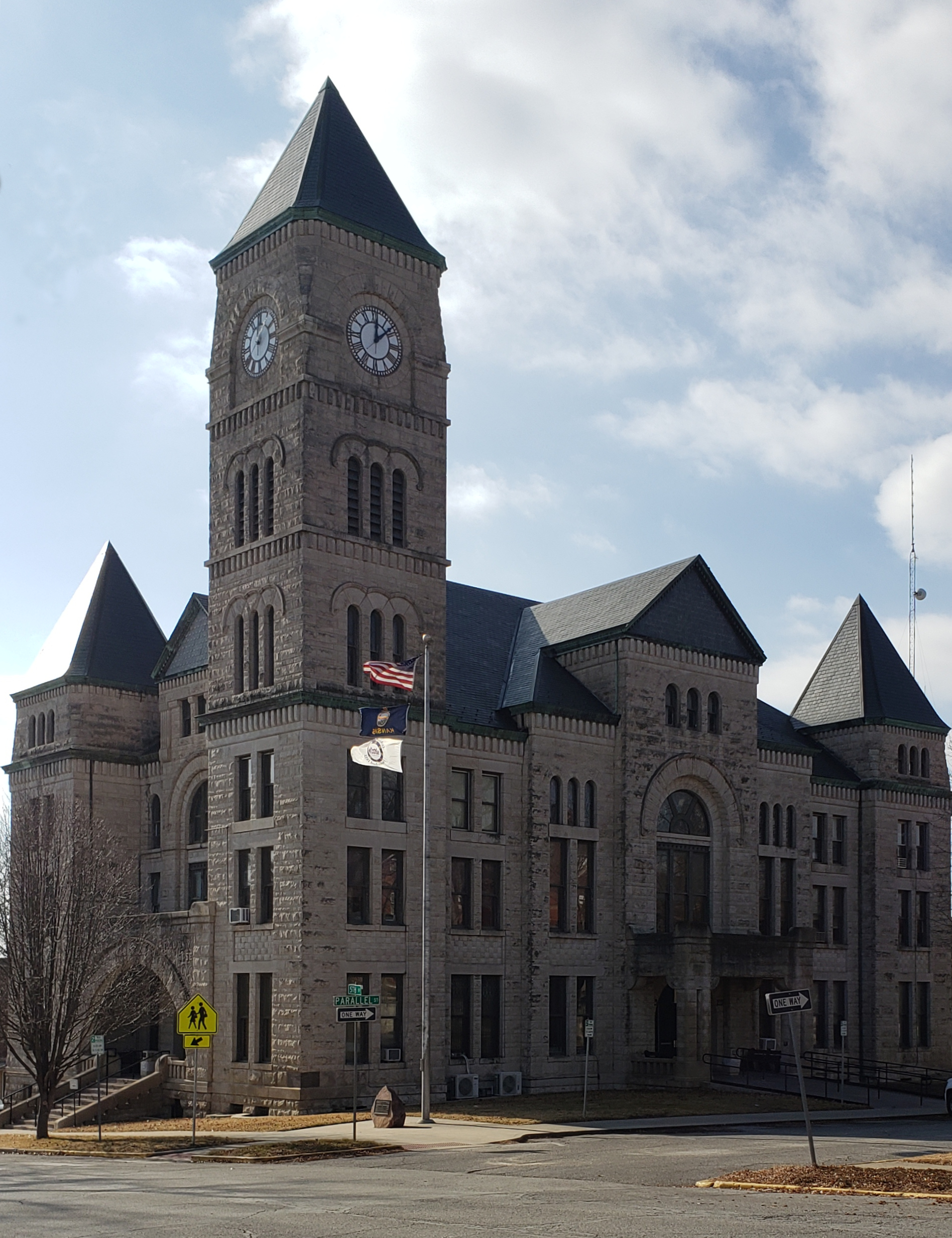
- Atchison County Courthouse in Atchison (2023)

- Flag Logo

- Location within the U.S. state of Kansas
- Country: United States
- State: Kansas
- Founded: August 25, 1855
- Named for: David Rice Atchison
- Seat: Atchison
- Largest city: Atchison

Area
  - Total: 434 sq mi (1,120 km^{2})
  - Land: 431 sq mi (1,120 km^{2})
  - Water: 2.6 sq mi (6.7 km^{2}) 0.6%

Population (2020)
  - Total: 16,348
  - Estimate (2025): 16,172 ▼
  - Density: 37.9/sq mi (14.6/km^{2})
- Time zone: UTC−6 (Central)
  - Summer (DST): UTC−5 (CDT)
- Area code: 913
- Congressional district: 2nd
- Website: AtchisonCountyKS.org

Atchison County is a county located in the northeastern portion of the U.S. state of Kansas. Its county seat and most populous city is Atchison. As of the 2020 census, the county population was 16,348. The county was named in honor of David Atchison, a U.S. Senator from Missouri and border ruffian during the "Bleeding Kansas" era.

== History ==
Atchison County was established in 1855, named for David Rice Atchison, a U.S. Senator from Missouri known for his pro-slavery views, which reflected the county's early political leanings during the Kansas Territory's tumultuous "Bleeding Kansas" period. The area was first explored by European traders and later by the Lewis and Clark Expedition in 1804, who celebrated the first Independence Day in the area. The first settlers, largely from Missouri, arrived in 1854, founding the town of Atchison that same year, which quickly became a hub due to its strategic location on the Missouri River, facilitating trade and transportation.

The Civil War era saw Atchison County as a center of pro-slavery sentiment, yet it also contributed soldiers to both sides of the conflict, reflecting the divided loyalties of the time. The county's economy was significantly shaped by its river port facilities, which were vital for the steamboat trade and later for railroad development. By 1860, the Atchison and Topeka Railroad was chartered, and by 1870, Atchison was a major railroad hub, with the Atchison, Topeka and Santa Fe Railway (Santa Fe) starting from there in 1868. This infrastructure, combined with Kansas Statehood in 1861 and the end of the Civil War in 1865, boosted the local economy and made Atchison a key point for westward expansion.

Moving into the late 19th century, Atchison County faced challenges like economic downturns and natural disasters, including floods, but it continued to grow as an industrial and agricultural center. The county became known for its flour milling, due to its proximity to wheat fields, and its manufacturing industries, particularly after the Civil War, when life normalized, and new enterprises sprang up.

== Geography ==
According to the U.S. Census Bureau, the county has a total area of 434 square miles (1,120 km^{2}), of which 431 square miles (1,120 km^{2}) is land and 2.6 square miles (6.7 km^{2}) (0.6%) is water. It is the fourth-smallest county by area in Kansas.

On July 4, 1804, to mark Independence Day, the Lewis and Clark Expedition named Independence Creek (River) located near the city of Atchison (see Timeline of the Lewis and Clark Expedition).

=== Adjacent counties ===
- Doniphan County (north)
- Buchanan County, Missouri (northeast)
- Leavenworth County (southeast)
- Platte County, Missouri (east)
- Jefferson County (south)
- Jackson County (west)
- Brown County (northwest)

=== Major highways ===
Sources: National Atlas, U.S. Census Bureau

- US-59
- US-73 / Lewis and Clark Trail
- US-159
- K-7
- K-9
- K-116

== Demographics ==
Historical population
| Census | Pop. | Note | %± |
|---|---|---|---|
| 1860 | 7,729 | | — |
| 1870 | 15,507 | | 100.6% |
| 1880 | 26,668 | | 72.0% |
| 1890 | 26,758 | | 0.3% |
| 1900 | 28,606 | | 6.9% |
| 1910 | 28,107 | | −1.7% |
| 1920 | 23,411 | | −16.7% |
| 1930 | 23,945 | | 2.3% |
| 1940 | 22,222 | | −7.2% |
| 1950 | 21,496 | | −3.3% |
| 1960 | 20,898 | | −2.8% |
| 1970 | 19,165 | | −8.3% |
| 1980 | 18,397 | | −4.0% |
| 1990 | 16,932 | | −8.0% |
| 2000 | 16,774 | | −0.9% |
| 2010 | 16,924 | | 0.9% |
| 2020 | 16,348 | | −3.4% |
| 2025 (est.) | 16,172 | ▼ | −1.1% |
U.S. Decennial Census; 1790-1960 1900-1990; 1990-2000 2010-2020

Atchison County comprises the Atchison, KS Micropolitan Statistical Area, which is also included in the Kansas City-Overland Park-Kansas City, MO-KS Combined Statistical Area.

=== Racial and ethnic composition ===
Atchison County, Kansas – Racial and ethnic composition Note: the US Census treats Hispanic/Latino as an ethnic category. This table excludes Latinos from the racial categories and assigns them to a separate category. Hispanics/Latinos may be of any race.
| Race / Ethnicity (NH = Non-Hispanic) | Pop 1980 | Pop 1990 | Pop 2000 | Pop 2010 | Pop 2020 | % 1980 | % 1990 | % 2000 | % 2010 | % 2020 |
|---|---|---|---|---|---|---|---|---|---|---|
| White alone (NH) | 16,841 | 15,426 | 15,170 | 15,152 | 13,925 | 91.54% | 91.11% | 90.44% | 89.53% | 85.18% |
| Black or African American alone (NH) | 1,141 | 931 | 883 | 844 | 785 | 6.20% | 5.50% | 5.26% | 4.99% | 4.80% |
| Native American or Alaska Native alone (NH) | 71 | 72 | 88 | 86 | 78 | 0.39% | 0.43% | 0.52% | 0.51% | 0.48% |
| Asian alone (NH) | 47 | 128 | 57 | 70 | 80 | 0.26% | 0.76% | 0.34% | 0.41% | 0.49% |
| Native Hawaiian or Pacific Islander alone (NH) | x | x | 9 | 8 | 6 | x | x | 0.05% | 0.05% | 0.04% |
| Other race alone (NH) | 19 | 5 | 11 | 16 | 49 | 0.10% | 0.03% | 0.07% | 0.09% | 0.30% |
| Mixed race or Multiracial (NH) | x | x | 229 | 365 | 842 | x | x | 1.37% | 2.16% | 5.15% |
| Hispanic or Latino (any race) | 278 | 370 | 327 | 383 | 583 | 1.51% | 2.19% | 1.95% | 2.26% | 3.57% |
| Total | 18,397 | 16,932 | 16,774 | 16,924 | 16,348 | 100.00% | 100.00% | 100.00% | 100.00% | 100.00% |

=== 2020 census ===
As of the 2020 census, the county had a population of 16,348. The median age was 36.9 years. 22.0% of residents were under the age of 18 and 17.8% of residents were 65 years of age or older. For every 100 females there were 95.4 males, and for every 100 females age 18 and over there were 94.1 males age 18 and over. 66.7% of residents lived in urban areas, while 33.3% lived in rural areas.

The racial makeup of the county was 86.3% White, 4.8% Black or African American, 0.5% American Indian and Alaska Native, 0.5% Asian, 0.0% Native Hawaiian and Pacific Islander, 1.6% from some other race, and 6.1% from two or more races. Hispanic or Latino residents of any race comprised 3.6% of the population.

There were 6,109 households in the county, of which 28.8% had children under the age of 18 living with them and 26.7% had a female householder with no spouse or partner present. About 32.0% of all households were made up of individuals and 13.7% had someone living alone who was 65 years of age or older.

There were 6,814 housing units, of which 10.3% were vacant. Among occupied housing units, 66.7% were owner-occupied and 33.3% were renter-occupied. The homeowner vacancy rate was 1.9% and the rental vacancy rate was 10.5%.

=== 2000 census ===
As of the 2000 census, there were 16,774 people, 6,275 households, and 4,279 families residing in the county. The population density was 39 people per square mile (15 people/km^{2}). There were 6,818 housing units at an average density of 16 units per square mile (6.2 units/km^{2}). The racial makeup of the county was 91.62% White, 5.32% Black or African American, 0.55% Native American, 0.34% Asian, 0.06% Pacific Islander, 0.51% from other races, and 1.59% from two or more races. Hispanic or Latino of any race were 1.95% of the population.

There were 6,275 households, out of which 32.40% had children under the age of 18 living with them, 54.30% were married couples living together, 10.00% had a female householder with no husband present, and 31.80% were non-families. 27.60% of all households were made up of individuals, and 12.80% had someone living alone who was 65 years of age or older. The average household size was 2.51 and the average family size was 3.05.

In the county, the population was spread out, with 26.70% under the age of 18, 11.30% from 18 to 24, 24.50% from 25 to 44, 21.40% from 45 to 64, and 16.20% who were 65 years of age or older. The median age was 36 years. For every 100 females there were 93.30 males. For every 100 females age 18 and over, there were 90.30 males.

The median income for a household in the county was $34,355, and the median income for a family was $40,614. Males had a median income of $29,481 versus $20,485 for females. The per capita income for the county was $15,207. About 7.90% of families and 13.30% of the population were below the poverty line, including 13.80% of those under age 18 and 17.90% of those age 65 or over.

== Government ==
=== Presidential elections ===
Atchison County has been a swing county for most of its history. It has had multiple extended streaks of being a bellwether county, the first running from 1896 to 1936. After voting more Republican than the nation in the 1940s and voting for losing candidate Richard Nixon in 1960, another bellwether streak ran from 1964 to 2004. Since then, the county has become significantly more Republican, with Barack Obama failing to win the county in both of his victories and Hillary Clinton losing it by over 30 percent to Donald Trump in 2016. Obama was the last Democratic nominee to get over 40% of the vote, in 2008.

Presidential election results

United States presidential election results for Atchison County, Kansas
| Year | Republican | | Democratic | | Third party(ies) | |
| Year | No. | % | No. | % | No. | % |
|---|---|---|---|---|---|---|
| 1888 | 3,219 | 52.10% | 2,603 | 42.13% | 357 | 5.78% |
| 1892 | 2,666 | 49.17% | 0 | 0.00% | 2,756 | 50.83% |
| 1896 | 3,326 | 52.65% | 2,963 | 46.91% | 28 | 0.44% |
| 1900 | 3,390 | 55.54% | 2,682 | 43.94% | 32 | 0.52% |
| 1904 | 3,542 | 64.25% | 1,854 | 33.63% | 117 | 2.12% |
| 1908 | 3,244 | 54.94% | 2,593 | 43.91% | 68 | 1.15% |
| 1912 | 1,535 | 27.40% | 2,449 | 43.72% | 1,618 | 28.88% |
| 1916 | 4,624 | 48.61% | 4,634 | 48.72% | 254 | 2.67% |
| 1920 | 5,872 | 65.02% | 3,082 | 34.13% | 77 | 0.85% |
| 1924 | 6,246 | 63.83% | 2,199 | 22.47% | 1,341 | 13.70% |
| 1928 | 6,647 | 63.67% | 3,756 | 35.98% | 37 | 0.35% |
| 1932 | 4,778 | 45.18% | 5,640 | 53.33% | 157 | 1.48% |
| 1936 | 5,312 | 47.60% | 5,817 | 52.12% | 31 | 0.28% |
| 1940 | 5,921 | 56.07% | 4,557 | 43.15% | 82 | 0.78% |
| 1944 | 4,731 | 58.58% | 3,325 | 41.17% | 20 | 0.25% |
| 1948 | 4,141 | 51.04% | 3,910 | 48.19% | 62 | 0.76% |
| 1952 | 6,004 | 64.59% | 3,283 | 35.32% | 9 | 0.10% |
| 1956 | 5,608 | 64.08% | 3,134 | 35.81% | 9 | 0.10% |
| 1960 | 4,793 | 52.33% | 4,336 | 47.34% | 31 | 0.34% |
| 1964 | 3,147 | 38.24% | 5,037 | 61.21% | 45 | 0.55% |
| 1968 | 3,644 | 46.00% | 3,379 | 42.65% | 899 | 11.35% |
| 1972 | 5,471 | 67.83% | 2,404 | 29.80% | 191 | 2.37% |
| 1976 | 4,030 | 48.30% | 4,108 | 49.23% | 206 | 2.47% |
| 1980 | 4,084 | 53.87% | 3,063 | 40.40% | 434 | 5.72% |
| 1984 | 4,537 | 62.54% | 2,641 | 36.40% | 77 | 1.06% |
| 1988 | 3,243 | 49.03% | 3,177 | 48.03% | 194 | 2.93% |
| 1992 | 2,521 | 33.48% | 2,959 | 39.30% | 2,050 | 27.22% |
| 1996 | 2,828 | 43.25% | 2,926 | 44.75% | 784 | 11.99% |
| 2000 | 3,378 | 48.96% | 3,171 | 45.96% | 351 | 5.09% |
| 2004 | 3,880 | 54.51% | 3,120 | 43.83% | 118 | 1.66% |
| 2008 | 3,791 | 52.72% | 3,241 | 45.07% | 159 | 2.21% |
| 2012 | 3,917 | 58.69% | 2,567 | 38.46% | 190 | 2.85% |
| 2016 | 4,049 | 61.58% | 1,989 | 30.25% | 537 | 8.17% |
| 2020 | 4,906 | 65.94% | 2,359 | 31.71% | 175 | 2.35% |
| 2024 | 4,911 | 67.69% | 2,201 | 30.34% | 143 | 1.97% |

=== Laws ===
Atchison County was a prohibition, or "dry", county until the Kansas Constitution was amended in 1986 and voters approved the sale of alcoholic liquor by the individual drink with a 30% food sales requirement.

== Education ==
=== Unified school districts ===
- Atchison County USD 377
- Atchison USD 409

== Communities ==
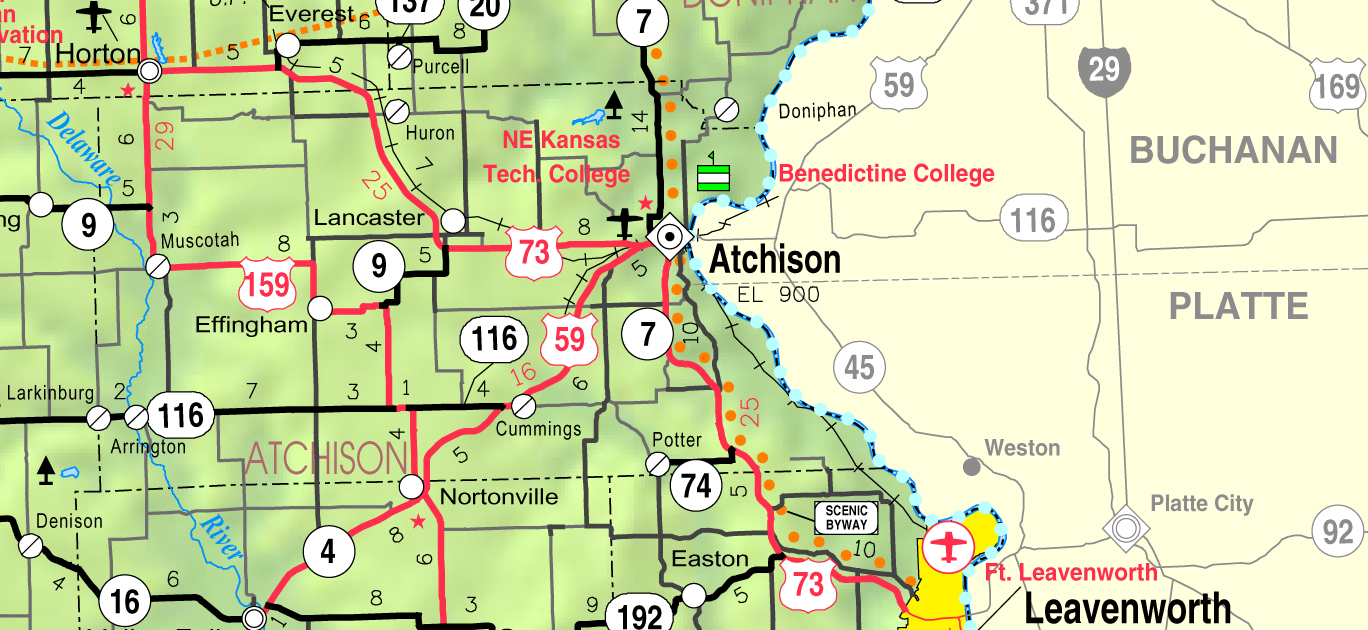
2005 map of Atchison County (map legend)

List of townships / incorporated cities / unincorporated communities / extinct former communities within Atchison County.

=== Cities ===
- Atchison (county seat)
- Effingham
- Huron
- Lancaster
- Muscotah

=== Unincorporated communities ===
‡ means a community has portions in an adjacent county.

- Arrington
- Cummings
- Eden
- Farmington
- Good Intent
- Kennekuk
- Larkinburg‡
- Monrovia
- Oak Mills
- Parnell
- Port Williams
- Potter
- St. Pats
- Shannon

=== Ghost towns ===
- Mount Pleasant
- Pardee

=== Indian reservation ===
- Kickapoo Indian Reservation of Kansas‡

=== Townships ===
Atchison County is divided into eight townships. The city of Atchison is considered governmentally independent and is excluded from the census figures for the townships. In the following table, the population center is the largest city (or cities) included in that township's population total, if it is of a significant size.

| Township | FIPS | Population center | Population | Population density /km^{2} (/sq mi) | Land area km^{2} (sq mi) | Water area km^{2} (sq mi) | Water % | Geographic coordinates |
|---|---|---|---|---|---|---|---|---|
| Benton | 06150 | Effingham | 1,076 | 7 (18) | 156 (60) | 0 (0) | 0.25% | 39°30′20″N 95°23′37″W |
| Center | 11550 | | 676 | 5 (13) | 139 (54) | 0 (0) | 0.15% | 39°28′52″N 95°16′54″W |
| Grasshopper | 28225 | Muscotah | 588 | 3 (9) | 170 (66) | 1 (0) | 0.52% | 39°35′12″N 95°30′4″W |
| Kapioma | 36100 | | 271 | 2 (6) | 123 (48) | 0 (0) | 0.05% | 39°29′6″N 95°31′8″W |
| Lancaster | 38350 | Lancaster | 922 | 6 (15) | 156 (60) | 0 (0) | 0.28% | 39°35′56″N 95°18′38″W |
| Mount Pleasant | 48925 | | 829 | 7 (17) | 124 (48) | 0 (0) | 0.09% | 39°29′17″N 95°11′3″W |
| Shannon | 64275 | | 1,753 | 12 (32) | 140 (54) | 2 (1) | 1.16% | 39°35′15″N 95°9′26″W |
| Walnut | 74800 | | 427 | 5 (12) | 94 (36) | 2 (1) | 2.34% | 39°27′55″N 95°5′3″W |
Sources: "Census 2000 U.S. Gazetteer Files". U.S. Census Bureau, Geography Division. Archived from the original on August 2, 2002.

== See also ==
- National Register of Historic Places listings in Atchison County, Kansas

Community information for Kansas

- Kansas locations by per capita income
- List of counties in Kansas
- List of townships in Kansas
- List of cities in Kansas
- List of unincorporated communities in Kansas
- List of ghost towns in Kansas
