= WWEO =

WWEO may refer to:

- WWEO-LP, a low-power radio station (103.9 FM) licensed to serve DeFuniak Springs, Florida, United States
- WWEO-CD, a low-power television station (channel 24) licensed to serve DeFuniak Springs, Florida
