= Mount Pleasant, Kansas =

Ghost Town in Kansas, United States

Coordinates: 39°26′52″N 95°08′16″W

Mount Pleasant is a ghost town in Atchison County, Kansas, United States. It was located approximately 1.5 miles north of Potter along Rawlins Rd.

== History ==
The first settlement at Mount Pleasant was made in 1854. A post office called Mount Pleasant was in operation from 1855 until 1900.

== See also ==
- List of ghost towns in Kansas
