= WLCV =

WLCV may refer to:

- WLCV-LP, a low-power radio station (103.9 FM) licensed to serve Ludington, Michigan, United States
- the student radio station at the University of Louisville
