= KCNM (AM) =

Radio station in Saipan, Northern Mariana Islands (1984–2020)

- Saipan, Northern Mariana Islands; United States
- Frequency: 1080 kHz

Programming
- Format: Defunct (formerly talk)
- Affiliations: Fox News Radio

Ownership
- Owner: Cecilia Lifoifoi; (Holonet Corporation)
- Sister stations: KZMI, KCNM-FM

History
- First air date: September 1, 1984
- Last air date: November 8, 2017
- Former call signs: WSZE (1978-1984)

Technical information
- Facility ID: 28864
- Class: B
- Power: 1,100 watts
- Transmitter coordinates: 15°09′0.00″N 145°42′52.00″E

KCNM (1080 AM) was a radio station licensed to Saipan, Northern Mariana Islands, which aired a talk format. It was an affiliate of Fox News Radio. The final owner was Cecilia Lifoifoi, through licensee Holonet Corporation.

== History ==
The station was first licensed, as WSZE, on 1053 kHz. The station was assigned the KCNM call letters by the Federal Communications Commission on September 1, 1984. In 1995, KCNM applied to move to 1080 kHz.

The station usually played country music, and once provided broadcasting in chamorro and carolinian at a limited time period. It became a news station from 2002.

The station's license was deleted on March 6, 2020; it had been off the air since at least November 8, 2017.
