= Dick Farrel =

American talk radio host and anti-vaccine activist (1956–2021)

- Born: Farrel Austin Levitt; August 1, 1956; New York City, U.S.
- Died: August 4, 2021 (aged 65); West Palm Beach, Florida, U.S.
- Cause of death: COVID-19
- Education: Queens College, City University of New York
- Occupations: Conservative media personality; anti-vaccine activist

Farrel Austin Levitt (August 1, 1956 – August 4, 2021), known professionally as Dick Farrel, was an American conservative media personality and anti-vaccine activist. Born and raised in Queens, New York City, he graduated from Queens College and began a career in radio broadcasting in the New York City area before moving to Florida in 1983. Farrel was working for WJUP in Jupiter and WFLN in Arcadia (today WCXS). Farrel was known as a shock jock with a provocative style, and also played a role in local Republican Party politics. His right-wing talk radio commentary led to a lawsuit for libel in 2002. He later served as a substitute host for Newsmax.

During the COVID-19 pandemic, Farrel was a prolific spreader of COVID-19 misinformation via social media. He mocked the pandemic as a "scam", encouraged people to avoid COVID-19 vaccination, and attacked Anthony Fauci as a "power tripping lying freak". Farrel became ill with COVID-19 in summer 2021, and his condition rapidly deteriorated. Once hospitalized, his friends said that he expressed regret about refusing vaccination and about his role in encouraging others to do so. He died from complications of the virus in West Palm Beach, Florida, on August 4, 2021, at age 65.
