= KTNC =

KTNC may refer to:

- KTNC-TV, a television station (channel 42 analog/63 digital) licensed to Concord, California, United States
- KTNC (AM), a radio station (1230 AM) licensed to Falls City, Nebraska, United States
