= XHPAT-FM =

Radio station in Pátzcuaro, Michoacán

- Pátzcuaro, Michoacán; Mexico
- Frequency: 106.5 MHz
- Branding: Clasics FM

Programming
- Format: Defunct

Ownership
- Owner: Medios Radiofónicos Michoacán; (Flavio René Acevedo)

History
- First air date: August 1, 2012 (permit)
- Last air date: January 8, 2020
- Call sign meaning: PATzcuaro

Technical information
- ERP: 2.603 kW

Links
- Webcast: radiomejor.com

XHPAT-FM was a noncommercial radio station on 106.5 FM in Pátzcuaro, Michoacán. It was owned by Medios Radiofónicos Michoacán through permitholder Flavio René Acevedo and carries its Clasics format, which was carried on MRM's three permit stations in the state.

XHPAT received its permit on August 1, 2012. MRM turned in the social concession and that of XHCHM-FM Ciudad Hidalgo on January 8, 2020, citing the state of the regional economy.
