= XHMTS-FM =

Radio station in Tampico, Tamaulipas

- Tampico, Tamaulipas; Mexico
- Frequency: 103.9 FM
- RDS: FORMULA
- Branding: Radio Fórmula

Programming
- Format: News/Talk and English classic hits

Ownership
- Owner: Grupo Fórmula; (Transmisora Regional Radio Fórmula, S.A. de C.V.)

History
- First air date: April 18, 1986 (concession)
- Former call signs: XEMTS-AM
- Former frequencies: 1590 kHz, 780 kHz
- Call sign meaning: Ciudad Madero TamaulipaS

Technical information
- Licensing authority: CRT
- Class: B1
- ERP: 25 kW
- HAAT: 66.88 m (219.4 ft)
- Transmitter coordinates: 22°21′36″N 97°54′54.7″W

Links
- Webcast: Listen live
- Website: radioformula.com.mx

XHMTS-FM is a radio station in Tampico, Tamaulipas, Mexico. It is an owned and operated station of Radio Fórmula, broadcasting on 103.9 MHz.

== History ==
Despite having been made available for commercial use on 1590 kHz from Ciudad Madero in 1976, XEMTS-AM 780 received its concession on April 18, 1986. XEMTS was owned by Radio de Teponaztli de Tampico, S.A. de C.V. and broadcast with 1,000 watts day and 250 at night. Radio Fórmula bought XEMTS in 2000 and converted it to FM in 2011.

On March 3, 2019, an operating agreement with Grupo GAPE Radio ended, and with it, the use of the "Fórmula NotiGAPE" name.
