= Port Williams =

Port Williams may refer to:

- In Nova Scotia
  - Port Williams, Nova Scotia (Kings County)
  - Port Williams, Annapolis County, see Port Lorne
- Port Williams, Alaska, location of Port Williams Seaplane Base
- Port Williams, Kansas
- Port Williams, Washington
- Puerto Williams, at the southern end of Chile
