= Kennekuk, Kansas =

Unincorporated community in Atchison County, Kansas

Coordinates: 39°31′07″N 95°18′35″W

Kennekuk is an unincorporated community in Atchison County, Kansas, United States.

== History ==
Kennekuk was platted in 1858. It was named for Kennekuk, a Kickapoo medicine man.

A post office was opened in Kennekuk in 1857, and remained in operation until it was discontinued in 1900.
