= Oak Mills, Kansas =

Unincorporated community in Kansas, U.S.

Coordinates: 39°26′44″N 95°00′38″W

Oak Mills is an unincorporated community in Atchison County, Kansas, United States.

== History ==
Oak Mills was located on the Missouri Pacific Railroad.

A post office was opened in Plum Grove (an extinct community) in 1862, but it was moved to Oak Mills in 1868 and remained in operation until it was discontinued in 1945.
