= KIJI =

Radio station in Tumon, Guam

- Tumon, Guam; Guam
- Broadcast area: Guam
- Frequency: 104.3 MHz (HD Radio)
- Branding: Boss 104.3

Programming
- Format: Adult contemporary
- Subchannels: HD3: KUSG simulcast (News/Talk)

Ownership
- Owner: Choice Broadcasting; (Guam Broadcast Services, Inc.)
- Sister stations: KNUT, KUSG (AM)

History
- First air date: September 1, 2005

Technical information
- Licensing authority: FCC
- Facility ID: 164176
- Class: C3
- ERP: 12,500 watts
- HAAT: 89 meters
- Transmitter coordinates: 13.432806°N 144.712556°E
- Translator: (93.3 MHz) K227CT (Agat)

Links
- Public license information: Public file; LMS
- Website: https://boss104.gu/

KIJI (104.3 FM), known as Boss 104.3, is a radio station based in the village of Tumon in the United States territory of Guam inside the La Casa de Colina building. It broadcasts an adult contemporary radio format from the 1980s, 1990s and 2000s.

== History ==
According to Pacific Daily News, the station signed on September 1, 2005, to provide news to Japanese tourists, who were currently staying on Guam. The station would also help Guam residents to learn Japanese language and culture. The branded station was FM104.

In late 2006, KIJI began programming a rhythmic-dance oldies format that was known as "Retro Radio" or "TenFour", which featured classic party tunes from the 1970s, 1980s, and 1990s. The format proved to be a favorite with listeners, resulting in KIJI going full-time with the format.

On March 5, 2012, KIJI changed to classic rock as Boss 104.3.

In May 2016 KIJI switched back to classic hits. In 2021, KIJI switched to adult contemporary.
