= Arrington, Kansas =

Human settlement in Atchison County, Kansas, United States

Coordinates: 39°27′46″N 95°32′11″W

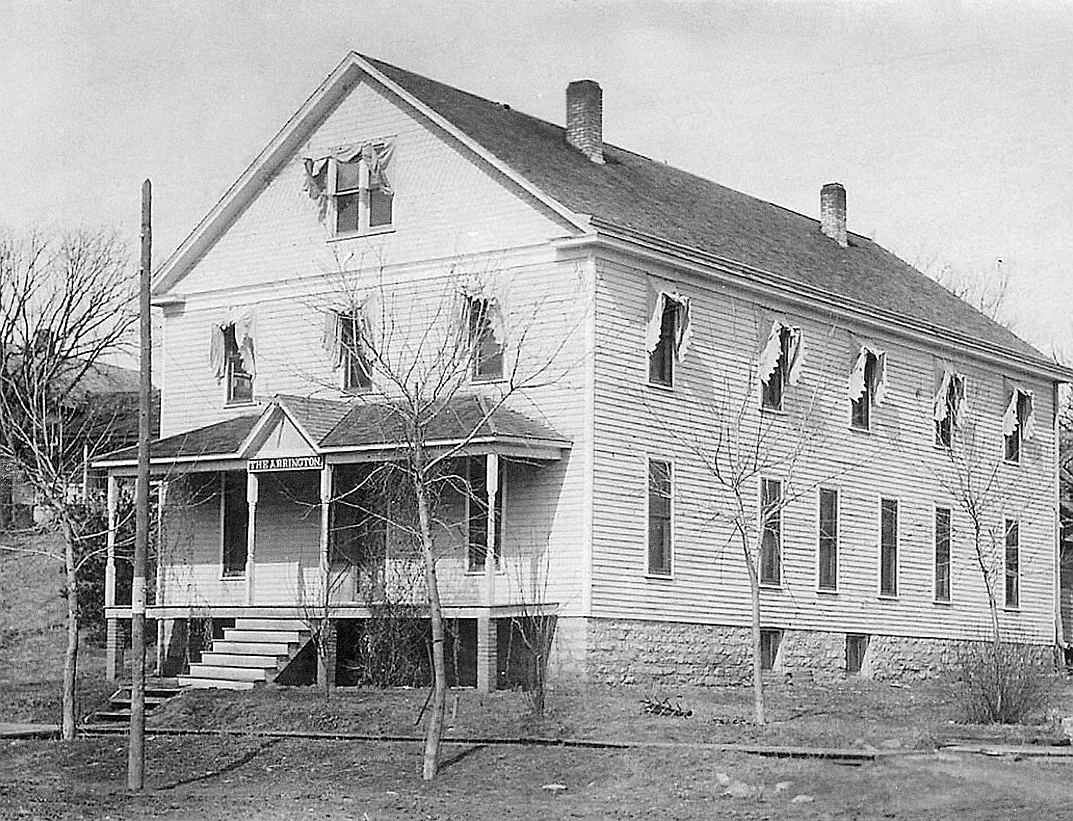
The Arrington Hotel was built in 1901, and razed in 1953

Arrington is an unincorporated community in Kapioma Township, Atchison County, Kansas, United States.

== History ==
Arrington was platted in 1884.
