= XHVF-FM =

Radio station in Chiapas, Mexico

- Villaflores, Chiapas, Mexico; Mexico
- Frequency: 103.9 FM
- Branding: Extremo Grupero

Programming
- Format: Grupera

Ownership
- Owner: Radio Núcleo; (Óscar Fonseca Alfaro)

History
- First air date: June 11, 1967
- Call sign meaning: "Villaflores"

Technical information
- ERP: 25 kW
- Transmitter coordinates: 16°12′40.2″N 92°14′49″W

Links
- Website: www.extremovillaflores.com

XHVF-FM is a radio station on 103.9 FM in Villaflores, Chiapas, Mexico. The station is owned by Radio Núcleo and carries its grupera format known as Extremo Grupero.

== History ==
XHVF began as XEVF-AM 1540, which came on air June 11, 1967. It was operated by José Narváez Rincón, who had earlier founded XEWM in San Cristóbal de las Casas. The station broadcast with 500 watts and was registered to Martín Glustein Cruz. Óscar Fonseca Alfaro, now a director at Radio Núcleo, became concessionaire in 1985.

In June 1994, XEVF moved from 1540 kHz to 730 in order to raise its power from 5,000 to 10,000 watts. It was one of the first AM stereo stations in southeastern Mexico.

On November 3, 2010, XEVF was cleared for AM-FM migration as XHVF-FM on 103.9 MHz.
