= Huron, Kansas =

- City
- Location within Atchison County and Kansas

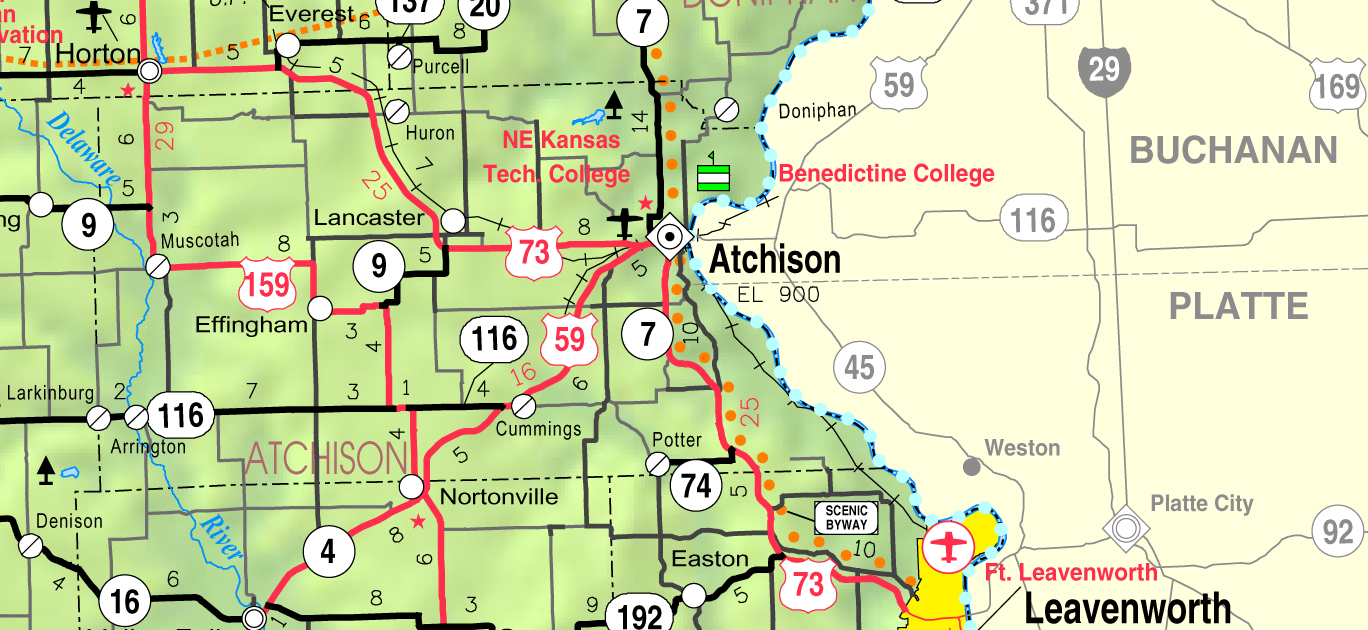
- KDOT map of Atchison County (legend)
- Coordinates: 39°38′18″N 95°21′04″W
- Country: United States
- State: Kansas
- County: Atchison
- Township: Lancaster
- Platted: 1882

Area
  - Total: 0.073 sq mi (0.19 km^{2})
  - Land: 0.073 sq mi (0.19 km^{2})
  - Water: 0 sq mi (0.00 km^{2})
- Elevation: 1,161 ft (354 m)

Population (2020)
  - Total: 74
  - Density: 1,000/sq mi (390/km^{2})
- Time zone: UTC−6 (CST)
  - Summer (DST): UTC−5 (CDT)
- ZIP Code: 66041
- Area code: 913
- FIPS code: 20-33575
- GNIS ID: 2394458

Huron is a city in Lancaster Township, Atchison County, Kansas, United States. As of the 2020 census, the population of the city was 74.

== History ==
Huron was platted in 1882 when the railroad was extended to that point. The city was named for Col. Anthony Huron, an original owner of the town site.

== Geography ==
According to the United States Census Bureau, the city has a total area of 0.85 square miles (2.20 km^{2}), all land.

== Demographics ==
Historical population
Census	Pop.	Note	%±
1900	200		—
1910	200		0.0%
1920	188		−6.0%
1930	149		−20.7%
1940	163		9.4%
1950	128		−21.5%
1960	119		−7.0%
1970	106		−10.9%
1980	107		0.9%
1990	75		−29.9%
2000	87		16.0%
2010	54		−37.9%
2020	74		37.0%
U.S. Decennial Census

=== 2020 census ===
The 2020 United States census counted 74 people, 30 households, and 20 families in Huron. The population density was 1,027.8 per square mile (396.8/km^{2}). There were 32 housing units at an average density of 444.4 per square mile (171.6/km^{2}). The racial makeup was 97.3% (72) white or European American (97.3% non-Hispanic white), 1.35% (1) black or African-American, 0.0% (0) Native American or Alaska Native, 0.0% (0) Asian, 0.0% (0) Pacific Islander or Native Hawaiian, 1.35% (1) from other races, and 0.0% (0) from two or more races. Hispanic or Latino of any race was 1.35% (1) of the population.

Of the 30 households, 36.7% had children under the age of 18; 43.3% were married couples living together; 16.7% had a female householder with no spouse or partner present. 33.3% of households consisted of individuals and 10.0% had someone living alone who was 65 years of age or older. The average household size was 2.4 and the average family size was 3.8. The percent of those with a bachelor's degree or higher was estimated to be 5.4% of the population.

23.0% of the population was under the age of 18, 10.8% from 18 to 24, 17.6% from 25 to 44, 33.8% from 45 to 64, and 14.9% who were 65 years of age or older. The median age was 43.5 years. For every 100 females, there were 100.0 males. For every 100 females ages 18 and older, there were 90.0 males.

The 2016–2020 5-year American Community Survey estimates show that the median household income was $35,625 (with a margin of error of +/- $26,281) and the median family income was $43,750 (+/- $23,989). The median income for those above 16 years old was $33,125 (+/- $12,052). Approximately, 0.0% of families and 5.8% of the population were below the poverty line, including 16.7% of those under the age of 18 and 6.7% of those ages 65 or over.

=== 2010 census ===
As of the census of 2010, there were 54 people, 20 households, and 13 families residing in the city. The population density was 63.5 inhabitants per square mile (24.5/km^{2}). There were 25 housing units at an average density of 29.4 per square mile (11.4/km^{2}). The racial makeup of the city was 98.1% White and 1.9% from two or more races. Hispanic or Latino of any race were 1.9% of the population.

There were 20 households, of which 40.0% had children under the age of 18 living with them, 50.0% were married couples living together, 10.0% had a female householder with no husband present, 5.0% had a male householder with no wife present, and 35.0% were non-families. 30.0% of all households were made up of individuals, and 10% had someone living alone who was 65 years of age or older. The average household size was 2.70 and the average family size was 3.23.

The median age in the city was 41 years. 31.5% of residents were under the age of 18; 5.6% were between the ages of 18 and 24; 27.9% were from 25 to 44; 27.8% were from 45 to 64; and 7.4% were 65 years of age or older. The gender makeup of the city was 51.9% male and 48.1% female.
