= XHESC-FM =

Radio station in Escárcega, Campeche, Mexico

Escárcega, Campeche, Mexico; Mexico
- Frequency: 103.9 MHz
- Branding: La Ke Buena

Programming
- Format: Grupera
- Affiliations: Radiópolis

Ownership
- Owner: Núcleo Comunicación del Sureste; (Radio Escárcega, S.A.)

History
- First air date: 1980
- Call sign meaning: ESCárcega

Technical information
- ERP: 6 kW
- Transmitter coordinates: 18°36′55″N 90°43′23″W

Links
- Webcast: Listen live
- Website: ncscampeche.com/radiochannel/ke-buena-escarcega/

XHESC-FM is a radio station in Escárcega, Campeche, Mexico. Broadcasting on 103.9 FM, XHESC is owned by Núcleo Comunicación del Sureste and broadcasts La Ke Buena national grupera format.

== History ==
XEESC-AM 820 was licensed in June 1980 for operation with 750 watts of power and migrated to FM with an authorization in 2011. Alberto Arceo Corcuera sold the station to Radio Escárcega, S.A., in 2015.
