= Benton Township, Atchison County, Kansas =

Benton Township
- Township
- Location in Atchison County
- Coordinates: 39°28′05″N 095°24′41″W
- Country: United States
- State: Kansas
- County: Atchison

Area
  - Total: 60.3 sq mi (156.3 km^{2})
  - Land: 60.2 sq mi (155.9 km^{2})
  - Water: 0.15 sq mi (0.4 km^{2}) 0.26%
- Elevation: 1,109 ft (338 m)

Population (2010)
  - Total: 1,014
  - Density: 17/sq mi (6.5/km^{2})
- GNIS feature ID: 0473478

Benton Township is a township in Atchison County, Kansas, United States. As of the 2010 census, its population was 1,014.

== Geography ==
Benton Township covers an area of 60.3 square miles (156.3 km^{2}) and contains one incorporated settlement, Effingham. According to the USGS, it contains four cemeteries: Maple Grove, Monrovia, Neill and Pleasant Grove.

The stream of North Fork Stranger Creek runs through this township.
