= Lancaster, Kansas =

- City
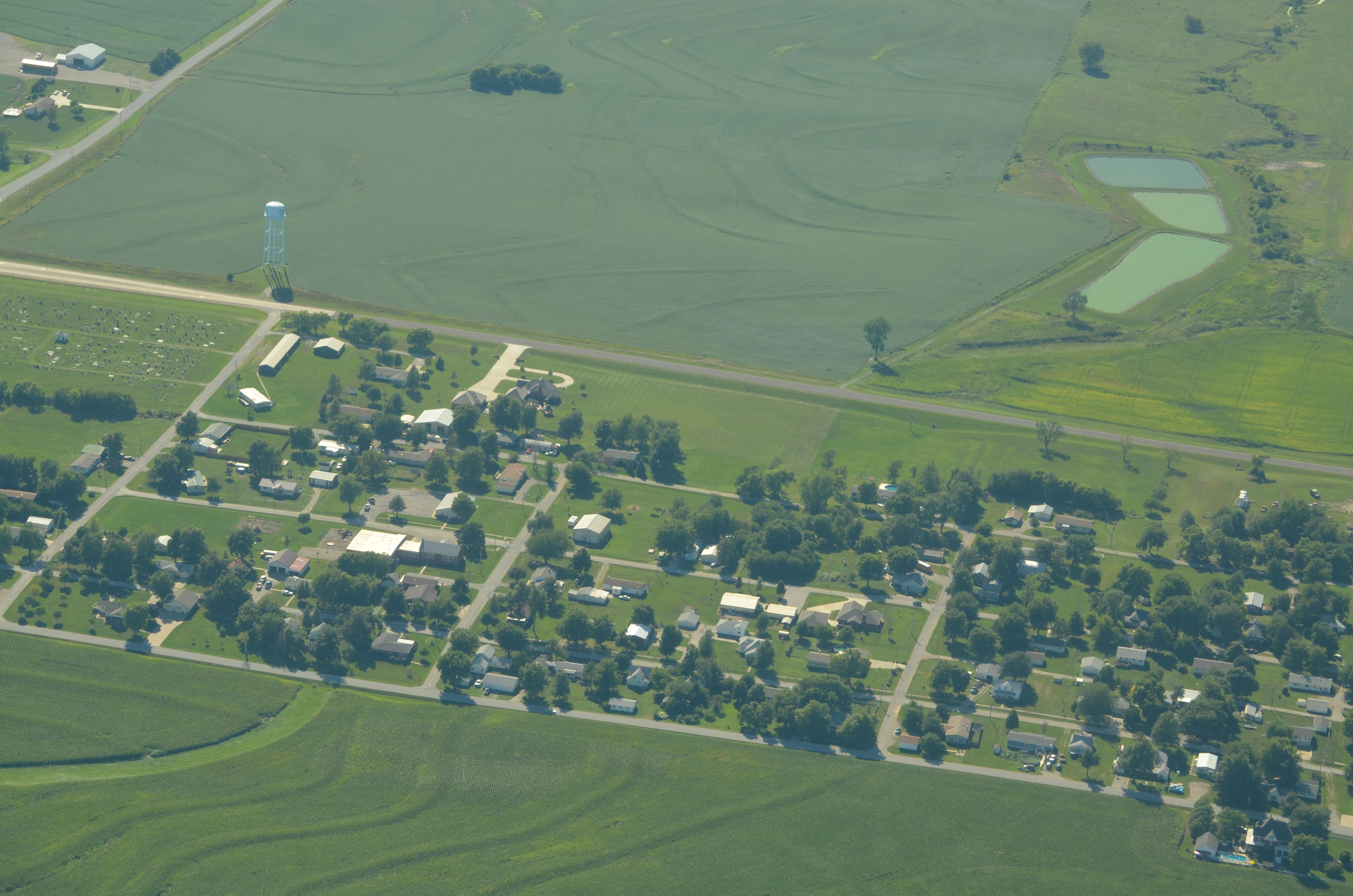
- Aerial view of Lancaster (2013)

- Location within Atchison County and Kansas

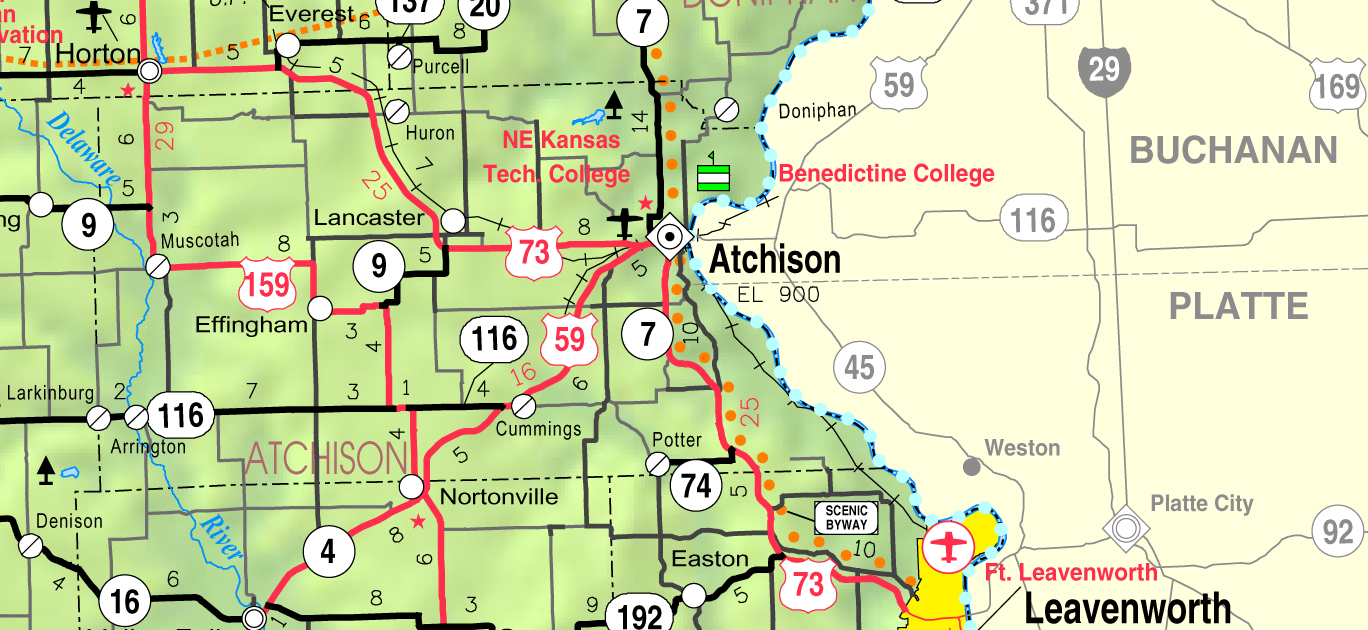
- KDOT map of Atchison County (legend)
- Coordinates: 39°34′16″N 95°18′13″W
- Country: United States
- State: Kansas
- County: Atchison
- Township: Lancaster
- Founded: 1850s
- Platted: 1857
- Named for: Lancaster, Pennsylvania

Area
  - Total: 0.20 sq mi (0.52 km^{2})
  - Land: 0.20 sq mi (0.52 km^{2})
  - Water: 0 sq mi (0.00 km^{2})
- Elevation: 1,161 ft (354 m)

Population (2020)
  - Total: 246
  - Density: 1,200/sq mi (470/km^{2})
- Time zone: UTC−6 (CST)
  - Summer (DST): UTC−5 (CDT)
- ZIP Code: 66041
- Area code: 913
- FIPS code: 20-38325
- GNIS ID: 2395625

Lancaster is a city in Lancaster Township, Atchison County, Kansas, United States. As of the 2020 census, the population of the city was 246.

== History ==
Lancaster was platted in 1857. It may have been named after Lancaster, Pennsylvania. Lancaster was an early contender for county seat. Lancaster was a station on the Missouri Pacific Railroad.

In 1915, Lancaster contained seven stores, a school, three churches, a grain elevator, a lumber yard, and a hotel.

== Geography ==
According to the United States Census Bureau, the city has a total area of 0.22 square miles (0.57 km^{2}), all land.

== Demographics ==
Historical population
Census	Pop.	Note	%±
1900	292		—
1910	220		−24.7%
1920	184		−16.4%
1930	188		2.2%
1940	163		−13.3%
1950	200		22.7%
1960	196		−2.0%
1970	279		42.3%
1980	274		−1.8%
1990	299		9.1%
2000	291		−2.7%
2010	298		2.4%
2020	246		−17.4%
U.S. Decennial Census

=== 2020 census ===
The 2020 United States census counted 246 people, 109 households, and 73 families in Lancaster. The population density was 1,236.2 per square mile (477.3/km^{2}). There were 109 housing units at an average density of 547.7 per square mile (211.5/km^{2}). The racial makeup was 96.34% (237) white or European American (95.12% non-Hispanic white), 0.0% (0) black or African-American, 0.0% (0) Native American or Alaska Native, 0.0% (0) Asian, 0.0% (0) Pacific Islander or Native Hawaiian, 0.0% (0) from other races, and 3.66% (9) from two or more races. Hispanic or Latino of any race was 1.63% (4) of the population.

Of the 109 households, 39.4% had children under the age of 18; 46.8% were married couples living together; 24.8% had a female householder with no spouse or partner present. 29.4% of households consisted of individuals and 10.1% had someone living alone who was 65 years of age or older. The average household size was 2.8 and the average family size was 3.8. The percent of those with a bachelor's degree or higher was estimated to be 4.9% of the population.

21.1% of the population was under the age of 18, 10.2% from 18 to 24, 21.1% from 25 to 44, 31.3% from 45 to 64, and 16.3% who were 65 years of age or older. The median age was 43.6 years. For every 100 females, there were 95.2 males. For every 100 females ages 18 and older, there were 90.2 males.

The 2016–2020 5-year American Community Survey estimates show that the median household income was $35,000 (with a margin of error of +/- $15,966) and the median family income was $60,000 (+/- $27,460). Males had a median income of $40,078 (+/- $14,878) versus $22,833 (+/- $8,285) for females. The median income for those above 16 years old was $24,938 (+/- $3,612). Approximately, 10.3% of families and 17.0% of the population were below the poverty line, including 25.9% of those under the age of 18 and 6.2% of those ages 65 or over.

=== 2010 census ===
As of the census of 2010, there were 298 people, 108 households, and 87 families residing in the city. The population density was 1,354.5 inhabitants per square mile (523.0/km^{2}). There were 117 housing units at an average density of 531.8 per square mile (205.3/km^{2}). The racial makeup of the city was 98.0% White, 0.3% African American, 1.0% Native American, and 0.7% Asian.

There were 108 households, of which 38.9% had children under the age of 18 living with them, 65.7% were married couples living together, 10.2% had a female householder with no husband present, 4.6% had a male householder with no wife present, and 19.4% were non-families. 16.7% of all households were made up of individuals, and 10.2% had someone living alone who was 65 years of age or older. The average household size was 2.76 and the average family size was 3.08.

The median age in the city was 40 years. 27.9% of residents were under the age of 18; 6.4% were between the ages of 18 and 24; 23.8% were from 25 to 44; 29.6% were from 45 to 64; and 12.4% were 65 years of age or older. The gender makeup of the city was 50.7% male and 49.3% female.
