= Grasshopper Township, Kansas =

Grasshopper Township
- Township
- Location in Atchison County
- Coordinates: 39°35′48″N 095°26′15″W
- Country: United States
- State: Kansas
- County: Atchison

Area
  - Total: 66.0 sq mi (170.9 km^{2})
  - Land: 65.7 sq mi (170.2 km^{2})
  - Water: 0.27 sq mi (0.7 km^{2}) 0.41%
- Elevation: 1,076 ft (328 m)

Population (2010)
  - Total: 567
  - Density: 8.5/sq mi (3.3/km^{2})
- GNIS feature ID: 0473240

Grasshopper Township is a township in Atchison County, Kansas, United States. As of the 2010 census, its population was 567.

== History ==
Grasshopper Township was established in 1855 as one of the three original townships of Atchison County.

== Geography ==
Grasshopper Township covers an area of 66.0 square miles (170.9 km^{2}) and contains one incorporated settlement, Muscotah. According to the USGS, it contains three cemeteries: Brush Creek, Forest Grove and Wheatland.

The streams of Brush Creek, Clear Creek, Little Delaware River, Little Grasshopper Creek, Mission Creek, Otter Creek and South Creek run through this township.
