= XHLD-FM =

Radio station in Autlán de Navarro, Jalisco

- Autlán, Jalisco; Mexico
- Frequencies: 103.9 FM; 780 AM
- Branding: Radio Costa

Programming
- Format: Regional Mexican

Ownership
- Owner: XELD Radio Autlán, S.A. de C.V.

History
- First air date: October 22, 1962 (concession)

Technical information
- Licensing authority: CRT
- Class: B
- ERP: 25 kW
- HAAT: 556.2 m (1,825 ft)
- Transmitter coordinates: 19°45′55.1″N 104°16′19.4″W

Links
- Website: radiocosta.com.mx

XHLD-FM / XELD-AM is a radio station on 103.9 FM and 780 AM in Autlán, Jalisco. It is owned by XELD Radio Costa and carries a Regional Mexican format known as Radio Costa.

== History ==
XELD-AM received its concession (a broadcast license) on October 22, 1962. It was owned by Ernesto Medina Lima and broadcast on 1240 kHz with 1,000 watts during the day and 100 at night. In 1972, it was transferred to XELD Radio Autlán.

In the 1980s, XELD was moved to 780 kHz with 5,000 watts.

XELD was authorized to migrate to FM in 2012 as XHLD-FM on 103.9. However, it was required to maintain its AM frequency in operation.
