= Potter, Kansas =

Unincorporated community in Atchison County, Kansas

- Unincorporated community
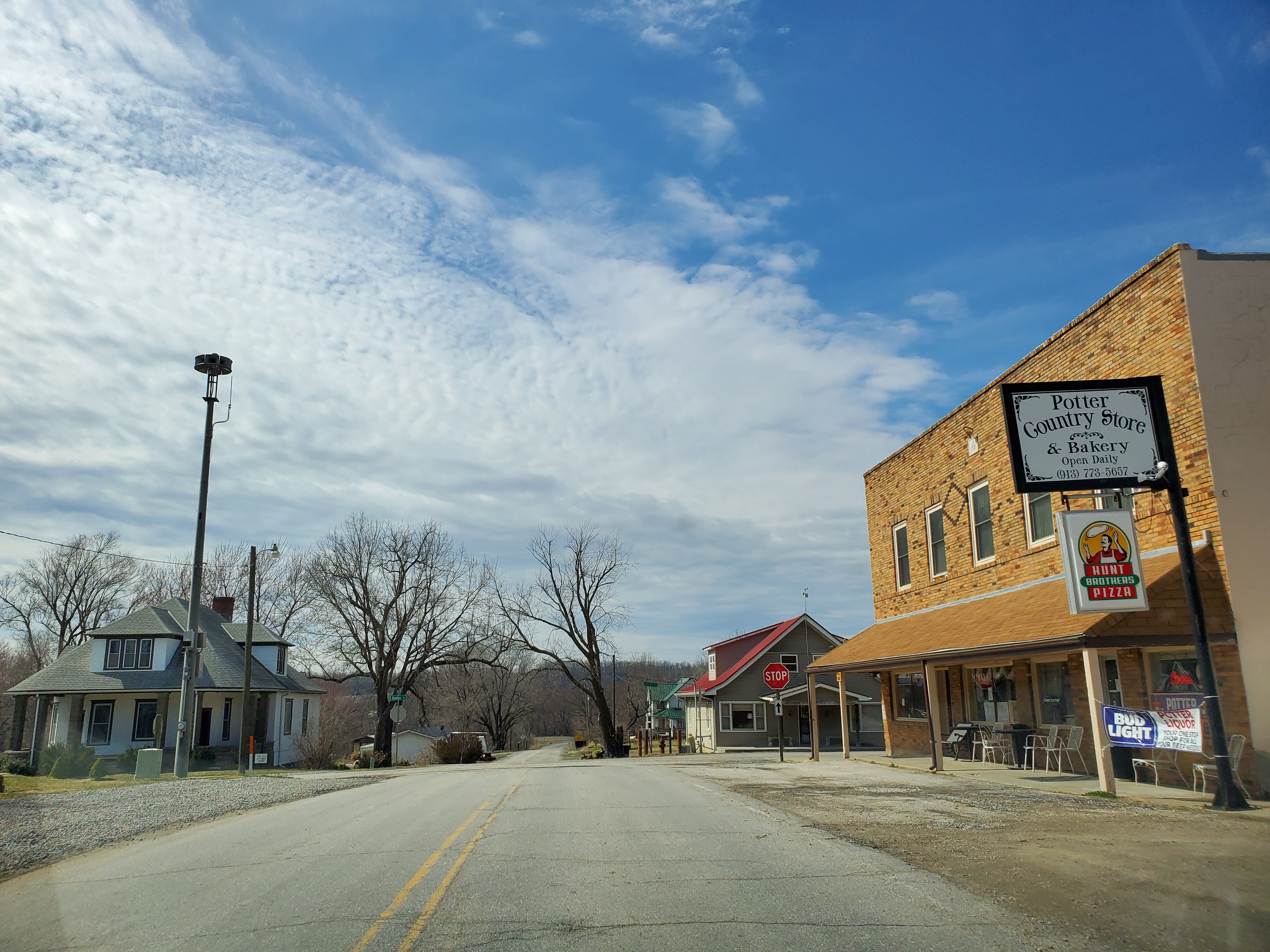
- Intersection in Potter (2020)

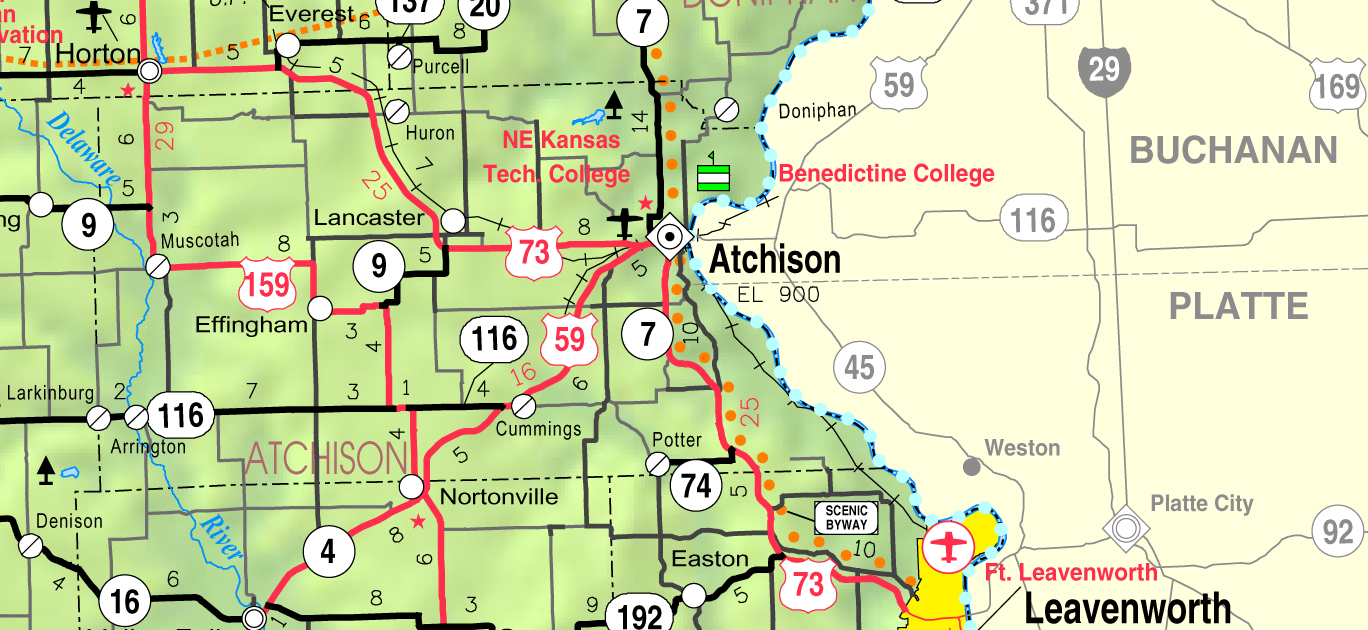
- KDOT map of Atchison County (legend)

- Location within Kansas Location within the United States
- Coordinates: 39°25′33″N 95°08′31″W
- Country: United States
- State: Kansas
- County: Atchison
- Township: Mount Pleasant
- Founded: 1886
- Named for: Joseph Potter
- Elevation: 968 ft (295 m)
- Time zone: UTC-6 (CST)
  - Summer (DST): UTC-5 (CDT)
- ZIP Code: 66062
- Area code: 913
- FIPS code: 20-57275
- GNIS ID: 478256

Potter is an unincorporated community in Mount Pleasant Township, Atchison County, Kansas, United States. It is located at the intersection of 210th Rd (formerly K-74 highway) and Rawlins Rd, approximately 9.5 miles (15.3 km) south of Atchison.

== History ==
Potter had its start in the year 1886 by the building of the railroad through that territory. It was named for Joseph Potter, a pioneer settler.

Potter had a post office with ZIP Code 66077, which opened on May 14, 1865, and closed on May 16, 2009.
