= Lancaster Township, Kansas =

Lancaster Township
- Township
- Location in Atchison County
- Coordinates: 39°36′03″N 095°18′43″W
- Country: United States
- State: Kansas
- County: Atchison

Area
  - Total: 60.3 sq mi (156.2 km^{2})
  - Land: 60.1 sq mi (155.7 km^{2})
  - Water: 0.15 sq mi (0.4 km^{2}) 0.28%
- Elevation: 1,053 ft (321 m)

Population (2010)
  - Total: 818
  - Density: 14/sq mi (5.3/km^{2})
- GNIS feature ID: 0473252

Lancaster Township is a township in Atchison County, Kansas, United States. As of the 2010 census, its population was 818.

== Geography ==
Lancaster Township covers an area of 60.3 square miles (156.2 km^{2}) and contains two incorporated settlements: Huron and Lancaster. According to the USGS, it contains two cemeteries: Alderson and Old Huron.
