= Pardee, Kansas =

Coordinates: 39°29′07″N 95°17′16″W

Pardee is a ghost town in Atchison County, Kansas, United States.

== History ==
Pardee was platted in 1857, and named for Pardee Butler, a local reverend and abolitionist. A post office was established at Pardee in 1858, and remained in operation until it was discontinued in 1903.

== See also ==
- List of ghost towns in Kansas
