= Good Intent, Kansas =

Unincorporated community in Kansas, U.S.

Coordinates: 39°36′00″N 95°13′01″W

Good Intent is an unincorporated community in Atchison County, Kansas, United States.

== History ==
A post office was opened in Good Intent in 1872, and remained in operation until it was discontinued in 1900.
