= Parnell, Kansas =

Unincorporated community in Kansas, U.S.

Coordinates: 39°30′23″N 95°12′24″W

Parnell is an unincorporated community in Atchison County, Kansas, United States.

== History ==
Parnell was platted in 1883. It was named for James L. Parnell, a member of the 13th Kansas Militia Infantry Regiment, who was killed in the Civil War.

Parnell had a post office from 1883 until 1923.
