= Eden, Kansas =

Unincorporated community in Kansas, U.S.

Coordinates: 39°38′05″N 95°15′51″W

Eden is an unincorporated community in Atchison County, Kansas, United States. It is approximately five miles west and north of Atchison. It lies at the present-day intersection of Labette, 322nd and 326th Roads.

== History ==
A post office was opened in Eden in 1858, and remained in operation until it was discontinued in 1900.
