= WXAN =

Coordinates: 37°51′19.1″N 89°28′6.3″W

- Ava, Illinois; United States
- Broadcast area: Carbondale, Illinois; Murphysboro, Illinois; Du Quoin, Illinois; Pinckneyville, Illinois
- Frequency: 103.9 MHz

Programming
- Format: Southern gospel

Ownership
- Owner: Danny Hood; (Mountain Valley Media LLC)

Technical information
- Licensing authority: FCC
- Facility ID: 26173
- Class: A
- ERP: 2,900 watts
- HAAT: 143 meters (469 ft)

Links
- Public license information: Public file; LMS
- Webcast: Listen live
- Website: wxanfm.com

WXAN is a radio station airing a Southern Gospel Music format licensed to Ava, Illinois, broadcasting on 103.9 FM. The station serves the areas of Carbondale, Illinois, Murphysboro, Illinois, Du Quoin, Illinois, and Pinckneyville, Illinois and is owned by Danny Hood, through licensee Mountain Valley Media LLC.

The station was founded in 1982 by Harold and Carlene Lawder. In 2021, Danny and Lee Ann Hood purchased WXAN. Specific programming includes nationally syndicated preachers and pastors Adrian Rodgers, Charles Stanley, Jack Graham, and David Jeremiah. The General Manager of WXAN is Will Stephens. Stephens hosts "The Will Stephens Show" weekdays from 12 noon - 1 pm. The shoe features interviews with Illinois newsmakers. WXAN is also the voice of Pinckneyville Panther sports.
