= XHCHM-FM =

Radio station in Ciudad Hidalgo, Michoacán

Ciudad Hidalgo, Michoacán; Mexico
- Frequency: 97.7 MHz
- Branding: Clasics FM

Ownership
- Owner: Medios Radiofónicos Michoacán; (Blanca Estela Castañeda Terán)

History
- First air date: April 30, 2013 (permit)
- Last air date: January 8, 2020 (surrender)
- Call sign meaning: Ciudad Hidalgo Michoacán

Technical information
- Class: A
- ERP: 3 kW
- HAAT: -85.51 meters
- Transmitter coordinates: 19°42′38.93″N 100°32′44.35″W

Links
- Webcast: radiomejor.com

XHCHM-FM was a noncommercial radio station on 97.7 FM in Ciudad Hidalgo, Michoacán. It is owned by Medios Radiofónicos Michoacán through permitholder Blanca Estela Castañeda Terán and carries its Clasics format, which was carried on MRM's three permit stations in the state.

XHCHM received its permit on April 30, 2013. MRM turned in the social concession and that of XHPAT-FM Pátzcuaro on January 8, 2020, citing the state of the regional economy.
