= KERL =

- Earle, Arkansas; United States
- Frequency: 103.9 MHz
- Branding: 103.9 The Hog

Programming
- Format: Country

Ownership
- Owner: Bobby Caldwell; (Bobby D. Caldwell Revocable Trust)

History
- First air date: 2004 (as KCJF)
- Former call signs: KCJF (2001–2019); KHGA (2019–2024)

Technical information
- Licensing authority: FCC
- Facility ID: 78214
- Class: C3
- ERP: 12,500 watts
- HAAT: 143 meters (469 ft)
- Transmitter coordinates: 35°27′1″N 90°42′11″W

Links
- Public license information: Public file; LMS

KERL (103.9 FM, "103.9 The Hog") is a country music radio station licensed to Earle, Arkansas, United States. The station is owned by Bobby Caldwell's East Arkansas Broadcasters, through licensee Bobby D. Caldwell Revocable Trust.
