= WXIS =

Coordinates: 36.138°N 82.383°W

- Erwin, Tennessee; United States
- Broadcast area: Johnson City; Kingsport; Elizabethton; Bristol, TN-VA; Greeneville
- Frequency: 103.9 MHz
- Branding: News 103.9 LiveWire Radio

Programming
- Format: News/talk
- Affiliations: CBS News Radio; ABC News Radio; The Weather Channel; Bloomberg Radio

Ownership
- Owner: Jet Broadcasting, Inc.

History
- First air date: 1968

Technical information
- Facility ID: 71481
- Class: A
- ERP: 6,000 watts
- HAAT: 100 meters (330 ft)
- Translator: 92.3 W222AG (Johnson City)

Links
- Webcast: Listen Live
- Website: 103.9 Livewire Radio Website

WXIS (103.9 FM) is an all-news radio station serving Elizabethton, Greeneville, and the Tri-Cities region of Johnson City, Kingsport and Bristol in Tennessee, as well as Bristol in Virginia. The WEMB outlet operates with an ERP of 6 kW and is licensed and based in Erwin, Tennessee.

In September 2024, the station's studio and tower were both destroyed by Hurricane Helene.
