= Port Williams, Kansas =

Unincorporated community in Kansas, U.S.

Coordinates: 39°27′23″N 95°01′58″W

Port Williams is an unincorporated community in Atchison County, Kansas, United States.

== History ==
Port Williams was located on the Missouri Pacific Railroad. Port Williams, or Port William, had a post office from 1856 until 1860.
