= Kapioma Township, Kansas =

Kapioma Township
- Township
- Location in Atchison County
- Coordinates: 39°27′30″N 095°32′01″W
- Country: United States
- State: Kansas
- County: Atchison

Area
  - Total: 47.48 sq mi (122.97 km^{2})
  - Land: 47.45 sq mi (122.90 km^{2})
  - Water: 0.023 sq mi (0.06 km^{2}) 0.05%
- Elevation: 928 ft (283 m)

Population (2010)
  - Total: 292
  - Density: 6.2/sq mi (2.4/km^{2})
- GNIS feature ID: 1729699

Kapioma Township is a township in Atchison County, Kansas, United States. As of the 2010 census, its population was 292.

== History ==
Kapioma Township was named for a chief of the Kickapoo Indians.

== Geography ==
Kapioma Township covers an area of 47.5 square miles (123.0 km^{2}) and contains no incorporated settlements. According to the USGS, it contains two cemeteries: Earnst and Miller.

The streams of Catamount Creek, Elk Creek, Nebo Creek, Negro Creek and Straight Creek run through this township.

== Transportation ==
Kapioma Township contains one airport or landing strip, Strafuss Airport.
