= KDKI-LP =

- Twin Falls, Idaho; United States
- Broadcast area: Metro Twin Falls
- Frequency: 103.9 MHz
- Branding: 103.9 KDKI

Programming
- Format: Adult standards, jazz, big band and swing

Ownership
- Owner: Tamarack Community Broadcasting, Inc.

History
- First air date: September 16, 2014

Technical information
- Licensing authority: FCC
- Facility ID: 192885
- Class: L1
- ERP: 100 watts
- HAAT: −9 meters (−30 ft)
- Transmitter coordinates: 42°32′34.70″N 114°25′54.40″W

Links
- Public license information: LMS
- Webcast: Listen live
- Website: kdki.org

KDKI-LP is an Adult Standards, Jazz, Big Band, and Swing formatted broadcast radio station licensed to and serving Twin Falls, Idaho. KDKI-LP is owned and operated by Tamarack Community Broadcasting, Inc.
