= KMSM-FM =

Radio station at Montana Tech University in Butte, Montana

Butte, Montana; United States
- Frequency: 103.9 MHz
- Branding: 103.9 The Zone

Programming
- Format: Active rock

Ownership
- Owner: Cameron Maxwell; (Desert Mountain Broadcasting Licenses LLC)

History
- First air date: September 10, 1973
- Former frequencies: 91.5 MHz (1973–1995); 106.9 MHz (1995–2003); 107.1 MHz (2003–2011)
- Call sign meaning: Montana School of Mines, former owner

Technical information
- Licensing authority: FCC
- Facility ID: 3042
- Class: A
- ERP: 185 watts
- HAAT: −68 meters
- Transmitter coordinates: 46°00′23″N 112°26′31″W

Links
- Public license information: Public file; LMS
- Website: thezone1039.com

KMSM-FM (103.9 MHz) is a radio station licensed to serve Butte, Montana. The station is owned and operated by Cameron Maxwell, through licensee Desert Mountain Broadcasting Licenses LLC, and airs an active rock format.

This station began broadcasting in 1973 as the student-run station at Montana Technological University, owned by its students association. It operated on several frequencies but faced declining interest in the 2000s. The students cut funding for the station in 2019 and took it off the air in January 2020. The broadcast license was then sold to Desert Mountain and converted to private commercial operation.

== History ==
On November 21, 1972, the Associated Students of Montana Tech received a construction permit for a new radio station to operate with 10 watts on 91.5 MHz in Butte. Award of the permit came more than two years after a feasibility committee was formed to evaluate the possibility of an FM radio station on the Montana Tech campus. The new station adopted the university's second choice of call sign, as KTEK-FM was not available, and was set up with a Model Cities Program grant. The original studios, used throughout its history, were located on the lower level of the Student Union Building on campus; records were donated by stations in Butte and Great Falls.

KMSM-FM signed on September 10, 1973, broadcasting nine hours a day. Its programming primarily consisted of rock and jazz music.

The transmitter and antenna, originally located on the old gymnasium, moved to the Student Union Building in 1983 as a result of renovations. At the same time, the station received several new pieces of equipment and a stronger transmitter and began stereo broadcasts. By 1987, there were 60 student disc jockeys; less than two years later, that number had risen to 74.

In 1995, KMSM-FM moved to 106.9 MHz. At the same time, it increased power again and adopted its present the "King of the Hill" slogan. The frequency change had been approved by the FCC in 1994 at Montana Tech's request to reduce potential interference concerns with Butte's channel 6 television station, KTVM.

KMSM-FM spent much of the 2000s in decline, though it did move to 107.1 MHz in August 2003. However, declining student interest led Montana Tech to consider using KMSM's studio space for storage. A new general manager assisted in restoring the station and was instrumental in installing automation equipment that converted it into a 24-hour operation for the first time, airing music when no student shows were on the air.

In the 2010s, KMSM-FM moved again, this time to 103.9 MHz in 2011. Station management made a controversial cut of 18 volunteer non-student DJs in 2013 without formally notifying them, opting to run the station entirely on automation for a time. Student-produced programs returned in 2014.

After a poll in December 2019, the Associated Students of Montana Tech cut funding for KMSM-FM, forcing it off the air by February; the move came after the survey indicated low interest in the student-run outlet. Associated Students of Montana Tech did file a license renewal application for KMSM-FM in December 2020, in which it noted the station's silence and several omissions in its public inspection file.

Effective October 18, 2022, Associated Students of Montana sold KMSM-FM to Cameron Maxwell's Desert Mountain Broadcasting Licenses LLC for $45,000.

On June 8, 2023, KMSM-FM launched an active rock format under the branding "103.9 The Zone".
