= Shannon Township, Atchison County, Kansas =

Shannon Township
- Township
- Location in Atchison County
- Coordinates: 39°35′28″N 095°10′06″W
- Country: United States
- State: Kansas
- County: Atchison

Area
  - Total: 52.9 sq mi (137.0 km^{2})
  - Land: 52.4 sq mi (135.7 km^{2})
  - Water: 0.50 sq mi (1.3 km^{2}) 0.97%
- Elevation: 1,024 ft (312 m)

Population (2010)
  - Total: 1,282
  - Density: 25/sq mi (9.5/km^{2})
- GNIS feature ID: 0473281

Shannon Township is a township in Atchison County, Kansas, United States. As of the 2010 census, its population was 1,282.

== History ==
Shannon Township was established in 1855 as one of the three original townships of Atchison County.

== Geography ==
Shannon Township covers an area of 52.9 square miles (137.0 km^{2}) around the north and west of the county seat of Atchison. According to the USGS, it contains five cemeteries: Cummings, Mount Calvary, Mount Vernon, Myers and Taylor.

The streams of Deer Creek and Independence Creek run through this township.
