= KZMI =

Radio station in Garapan-Saipan, Northern Mariana Islands

- Garapan-Saipan, Northern Mariana Islands; United States
- Broadcast area: Northern Mariana Islands
- Frequency: 103.9 MHz

Programming
- Format: Adult contemporary

Ownership
- Owner: Cecilia Lifoifoi; (Holonet Corporation)
- Sister stations: KNUT

History
- First air date: September 1, 1984
- Former call signs: WSZE-FM

Technical information
- Licensing authority: FCC
- Facility ID: 28865
- Class: C3
- ERP: 3,200 watts
- HAAT: 252 meters (827 ft)
- Transmitter coordinates: 15°11′0″N 145°44′06″E

Links
- Public license information: Public file; LMS
- Webcast: Listen live
- Website: kzmi1039.com

KZMI (103.9 FM) is a radio station broadcasting an adult contemporary music format. Licensed to Garapan-Saipan, Northern Mariana Islands, the station is currently owned by Cecilia Lifoifoi, through licensee Holonet Corporation.

The station was assigned the KZMI call letters by the Federal Communications Commission on September 1, 1984.
