= Life FM (Gippsland) =

Coordinates: 38°6′31″S 147°3′56″E

Life FM Gippsland

Australia
- Broadcast area: Gippsland, Australia
- Frequency: 103.9 MHz FM
- Branding: 103.9 Life FM

Programming
- Format: Christian

History
- First air date: 29 October 2003
- Call sign meaning: GCB – Gippsland Christian Broadcasters

Technical information
- Class: Community radio

Links
- Website: www.lifefm.com.au

Life FM (call sign: 3GCB) is a community Christian radio station in the Victorian region of Gippsland that first aired early on 29 October 2003. On the FM band at 103.9 MHz from Mt. Tassie near Traralgon, with a studio and office in Sale, it broadcasts a variety of uplifting and family-friendly music and messages to encourage and inspire the region's Christian audience.

== Programs ==
- Gippsland Extra – local affairs program, hosted by Deb Bye
- A Different Perspective – Daily messages by Berni Bymet
- Christian Working Women – hosted by Mary Whelchel
- Focus on the Family – an American imported program, hosted by Dr. James Dobson
- Insight for Living – another American import, hosted by Chuck Swindoll
- Radio Dramas, including:
  - Father Gilbert Mysteries
  - Left Behind – Radio adaptation of the popular Christian novelisation series
  - Amazing Grace
- Gippsland Perspective – local news and events
- Light Up Latrobe
- Make Gippsland Great Again

== Leadership ==
Deb Bye, a former manager at ABC Gippsland, played a crucial role in the launching of Life FM and was the chief executive of the organization behind the radio station, Gippsland Christian Broadcasters, from 1999 until 2015.

David Braithwaite is the current station manager.
