= DXAP =

Defunct radio station in Butuan, Philippines

- Butuan; Philippines
- Broadcast area: Agusan del Norte and surrounding areas
- Frequency: 103.9 MHz

Programming
- Format: Silent

Ownership
- Owner: Image Broadcasting Corporation

History
- First air date: 2011
- Last air date: 2023
- Former names: Radyo Trumpeta (2011-2023)
- Call sign meaning: Amy Pagaspas (owner)

Technical information
- Licensing authority: NTC

DXAP (103.9 FM) was a radio station owned and operated by Image Broadcasting Corporation, a company owned by Norbert B. Pagaspas.

It first went on air as Radyo Trumpeta 103.9 in 2011. During its existence, it was located along J. C. Aquino Ave. in Butuan. It went off air in 2023 after being closed by City Government of Butuan due to the expired franchise of the owner's frequency. In October 2024, it was relaunched in Cagayan de Oro via 96.3 FM owned by Soundstream Broadcasting Corporation. It currently broadcasts on 95.7 FM owned by FBS Radio Network.
