= Mount Pleasant Township, Atchison County, Kansas =

Mount Pleasant Township
- Township
- Location in Atchison County
- Coordinates: 39°28′05″N 095°10′31″W
- Country: United States
- State: Kansas
- County: Atchison

Area
  - Total: 47.74 sq mi (123.64 km^{2})
  - Land: 47.71 sq mi (123.56 km^{2})
  - Water: 0.035 sq mi (0.09 km^{2}) 0.07%
- Elevation: 1,040 ft (317 m)

Population (2010)
  - Total: 864
  - Density: 18/sq mi (7/km^{2})
- GNIS feature ID: 0473489

Mount Pleasant Township is a township in Atchison County, Kansas, United States. As of the 2010 census, its population was 864.

== History ==
Mount Pleasant Township was established in 1855 as one of the three original townships of Atchison County.

== Geography ==
Mount Pleasant Township covers an area of 47.7 square miles (123.6 km^{2}) and contains no incorporated settlements. According to the USGS, it contains two cemeteries: Fairview and Round Mound.

The streams of Camp Creek, Crooked Creek and Spring Creek run through this township.
