= DWOP =

Defunct radio station in Camarines Sur, Philippines

- Camaligan; Philippines
- Broadcast area: Camarines Sur and surrounding areas
- Frequency: 103.9 MHz

Programming
- Format: Silent

Ownership
- Owner: Kaissar Broadcasting Network

History
- First air date: March 19, 2007
- Last air date: March 2023
- Former call signs: DWOS (2007–2014)
- Former names: DWOS (March 19, 2007-May 2019); Boom FM (May 2019-2021); DWOP (September 2022-March 2023)

Technical information
- Licensing authority: NTC

DWOP (103.9 FM) was a radio station owned by Kaissar Broadcasting Network.

The station was formerly managed by Sonia O. Leano's SOL Broadcasting from March 19, 2007 to 2021, when it went off the air. At that time, it was located along Magsaysay Ave., Naga, Camarines Sur. In September 2022, Family Radio Broadcasting leased the station. In March 2023, it went off the air. At that time, it was located at Brgy. Tarosanan, Camaligan.
