= WWND-LP =

- White Stone, Virginia; United States
- Broadcast area: White Stone, Virginia; Irvington, Virginia; Kilmarnock, Virginia; Deltaville, Virginia
- Frequency: 103.9 MHz
- Branding: Windy 103.9

Programming
- Format: Classic Hits; Classic Top 40; Carolina Beach; Oldies

Ownership
- Owner: White Stone Radio, Inc.

History
- First air date: April 14, 2016
- Call sign meaning: Windy

Technical information
- Licensing authority: FCC
- Facility ID: 194308
- Class: L1
- ERP: 100 watts
- HAAT: 28.7 meters (94 ft)
- Transmitter coordinates: 37°37′56.50″N 76°24′25.80″W

Links
- Public license information: LMS
- Webcast: Listen live
- Website: www.wwndradiofm.com

WWND-LP is a Classic Hits, Classic Top 40, Carolina Beach, and Oldies formatted broadcast radio station. The station is licensed to White Stone, Virginia and serving White Stone, Irvington, Kilmarnock, and Deltaville on the Northern Neck of Virginia. WWND-LP is owned and operated by White Stone Radio, Inc.
