= Atchison County Community High School =

High school in Kansas, United States

Atchison County Community Junior-Senior High School

Location
- 908 Tiger Road; Effingham, Kansas 66023; United States; 39°31′35″N 95°23′32″W

Information
- School type: Public, High School
- School district: USD 377
- CEEB code: 170855
- Principal: Brian Malm
- Grades: 7–12
- Enrollment: 258 (2023–2024)
- Campus: Rural
- Colors: Orange and black
- Athletics conference: Northeast Kansas League
- Mascot: Tiger
- Website: www.usd377.org/jr-sr-high-school

Atchison County Community High School is a public secondary school in Effingham, Kansas, United States, serving students in grades 7–12. It is operated by Atchison County USD 377 public school district. The school colors are orange and black. The average annual enrollment is approximately 325 students.

== Extracurricular activities ==
ACCHS is a member of the Kansas State High School Activities Association and offers a variety of sports programs. Athletic teams compete in the 3A division and are known as the "Tigers". Extracurricular activities are also offered in the form of performing arts, school publications, and clubs. Throughout its history, ACCHS has won a few state championships in various sports.

=== State championships ===
State Championships
Season	Sport	Number of Championships	Year
Winter	Basketball, Boys	1	1994
	Wrestling	4	1982, 1983, 2000, 2001
Total		5	

=== Sports and activities offered ===
- Fall
  - Football
  - Volleyball
  - Boys' Cross-Country
  - Girls' Cross-Country
  - Cheerleading
  - Dance
  - Fall Musical
- Winter
  - Boys' Basketball
  - Girls' Basketball
  - Wrestling
  - Cheerleading
  - Dance
  - Scholars' Bowl (Competitive Academic Contest)
  - Forensics (Competitive Speech and Drama)
- Spring
  - Baseball
  - Softball
  - Boys' Track and Field
  - Girls' Track and Field
  - Spring Play
  - Forensics (Competitive Speech and Drama)

== See also ==
- List of high schools in Kansas
- List of unified school districts in Kansas
