= WNOI =

- Flora, Illinois; United States
- Frequency: 103.9 MHz (HD Radio)
- Branding: MIX-FM 103.9

Programming
- Format: Adult contemporary
- Subchannels: HD2: Country
- Affiliations: Fox News Radio

Ownership
- Owner: H & R Communications, Inc.

History
- First air date: May 21, 1971

Technical information
- Licensing authority: FCC
- Facility ID: 25753
- Class: A
- ERP: 3,300 watts
- HAAT: 91 meters (299 ft)
- Translator: HD2: 99.3 W257DT (Flora)

Links
- Public license information: Public file; LMS
- Webcast: Listen live
- Website: wnoi.com

WNOI (103.9 FM) is a radio station licensed to Flora, Illinois, United States. The station airs an adult contemporary format, and is currently owned by H & R Communications, Inc.
