= WGLH =

Coordinates: 32.168°N 83.631°W

- Hawkinsville, Georgia; United States
- Frequency: 103.9 MHz

Programming
- Format: Contemporary Christian (K-Love)
- Network: K-Love

Ownership
- Owner: Educational Media Foundation

History
- First air date: 1968 (as WCEH-FM)
- Former call signs: WCEH-FM (1968–1993); WQSY (1993–2004); WRPG (2004–2008); WQXZ (2008–2020)

Technical information
- Licensing authority: FCC
- Facility ID: 67693
- Class: C3
- ERP: 10,500 watts
- HAAT: 151 meters

Links
- Public license information: Public file; LMS

WGLH (103.9 FM) is a Christian radio station licensed to Hawkinsville, Georgia, broadcasting at 103.9 MHz.

The station previously went by the call letters WCEH-FM, WQSY, WRPG and WQXZ.

In March 2017, WQXZ was sold to Educational Media Foundation (EMF) by Georgia Eagle Media for $150,000. The station was turned off for the format change on May 5 at 6 PM.

A few days later, the station returned to air broadcasting the contemporary Christian (K-Love) format. The purchase by EMF was consummated on May 10, 2017.
