= KRKA (FM) =

Air 1 radio station in Severance–Fort Collins, Colorado

- Severance, Colorado; United States
- Broadcast area: Fort Collins-Greeley; Northglenn, Colorado
- Frequency: 103.9 MHz
- Branding: Air1

Programming
- Format: Christian worship
- Network: Air1

Ownership
- Owner: Educational Media Foundation

History
- First air date: 2013
- Former call signs: KYEN (2007–2013)

Technical information
- Licensing authority: FCC
- Facility ID: 164151
- Class: C1
- ERP: 16,500 watts
- HAAT: 372 meters (1,220 ft)
- Transmitter coordinates: 40°37′3″N 105°19′40″W
- Translators: 89.1 K206EO (Granite, WY); 94.5 K233CH (Greeley); 103.9 K266CC (Cheyenne, WY); 104.1 K281DD (Cheyenne, WY)

Links
- Public license information: Public file; LMS
- Webcast: Listen live
- Website: air1.com

KRKA (103.9 FM) is a worship music formatted radio station licensed to Severance, Colorado, United States. The station serves the Ft. Collins - Greeley area. The station is owned by the Educational Media Foundation and broadcasts EMF's Air1 worship music format.
