= KZTK =

Coordinates: 47.122°N 97.325°W

- Arthur, North Dakota; United States
- Broadcast area: Casselton/Fargo–Moorhead
- Frequency: 103.9 MHz
- Branding: 103.9 The Truck

Programming
- Format: Commercial; Country

Ownership
- Owner: James A. Babbitt III; (Vision Media Incorporated)

History
- First air date: 1992 (as KCQV at 96.7)
- Former call signs: KCQV (1992–1998); KOCL (1998–1999); KVMI (1999–2014)
- Former frequencies: 96.7 MHz (1992–2003)

Technical information
- Licensing authority: FCC
- Facility ID: 41898
- Class: C3
- ERP: 25,000 watts
- HAAT: 100 meters

Links
- Public license information: Public file; LMS
- Webcast: Listen Live
- Website: 1039thetruck.com

KZTK, known as 103.9 The Truck, is a radio station serving Cass County, North Dakota that airs a country music format. They are licensed to Arthur, North Dakota with studios in Casselton, North Dakota broadcasting to the Fargo–Moorhead Arbitron market (#290).

== History ==
The station originally signed on 96.7 FM in 1992 as KCQV with an oldies format as "Kool 96.7". Kool 96.7 later changed its format. In 2003, the then-KVMI moved from its 5 kilowatt 96.7 signal to a new 25 kilowatt 103.9 frequency at a new transmitter site.

The move to 103.9 also encountered a format change back to oldies as "Kool 103.9". KVMI changed its format to adult contemporary as "Star 103.9" in 2004. The station has since changed to 103.9 "The Truck" and is a hot country format & features The Ben & Jim Show airing 7 AM to 9 AM Weekdays. The station changed its call sign to the current KZTK on March 13, 2014.

== Programming ==
KVMI changed to a country music brand posing as "103.9 The Truck" in January 2006, along with relocating the studios from Fargo, North Dakota to Casselton, North Dakota. The Truck also broadcasts to rural Cass County and has updates and programming from the Red River Farm Network, where they super serve agriculture communities in rural Cass County. KZTK are the call letters, known as 103.9 The Truck, yet KVMI Radio LLC is the business name and is owned by Vision Media Inc. Vision Media Inc. has as-sole owner since 1999, James A. Babbitt III. The Hot Country Programming is delivered via satellite by Westwood One/Dial Global in Colorado Springs, Colorado.
