= KUSG (AM) =

Radio station in Hagåtña, Guam

Hagåtña, Guam; Guam
- Broadcast area: Guam
- Frequency: 1350 kHz
- Branding: The Point

Programming
- Language: English
- Format: News/Talk radio
- Affiliations: Fox News Radio, Westwood One, Genesis Communications Network

Ownership
- Owner: Choice Broadcasting; (Management Advisory Services, Inc.)
- Sister stations: KNUT, KIJI

History
- First air date: July 9, 2012

Technical information
- Licensing authority: FCC
- Facility ID: 160741
- Class: B
- Power: 250 watts (unlimited)
- Transmitter coordinates: 13°27′24″N 144°40′20″E
- Translator: 93.3 K227CT (Agat)
- Repeater: 104.3 KIJI-HD3 (Tumon)

Links
- Public license information: Public file; LMS
- Website: thepoint.gu

KUSG (1350 AM) is a radio station licensed to serve the community of Hagåtña, Guam. The station is owned by Choice Broadcasting and carries a talk format known as "The Point".

The Point also airs on KUSG's FM translator, K227CT at 93.3 FM, and on the HD3 subchannel of KIJI 104.3 FM.

== History ==
MASI applied in 2004 for a new construction permit for a radio station on 1350 at Hagåtña. The application was approved on July 2, 2009; three years later on July 9, 2012, the new station began operations.

In 2017, KUSG was taken silent due to transmitter site problems and remained so for nearly a year. When it returned, it broadcast with 90 watts power because of a vandalized ground system. Delays related to elections in Guam kept a new lease from being secured. At 6p.m. Chamorro Standard Time on October 18, 2019, KUSG was taken silent, with MASI and its partner Choice awaiting necessary approval from the U.S. Army Corps of Engineers to clear the ground and rebuild; Choice is to buy the station from MASI when it returns to air.

== Programming ==
Initially known as "The Pulse", KUSG relaunched as "The Point" in 2017 under Choice operations. The station revamped its lineup, bringing The Rush Limbaugh Show, Sean Hannity and other conservative talkers back to the island's radio dial.
