= KJJS =

Radio station in Zapata, Texas

Zapata, Texas; United States
- Broadcast area: Zapata County, Texas
- Frequency: 103.9 MHz
- Branding: 'La Rancherita'

Programming
- Format: Regional Mexican

Ownership
- Owner: Hispanic Target Media, Inc.

Technical information
- Licensing authority: FCC
- Facility ID: 162400
- Class: A
- ERP: 4,500 Watts
- HAAT: 115 meters (377 ft)
- Transmitter coordinates: 26°55′02″N 99°15′00″W

Links
- Public license information: Public file; LMS
- Webcast: Listen Live

KJJS (103.9 FM "La Rancherita 103.9") is a radio station that serves the Laredo, Texas market, in rural Zapata County, Texas, United States. Its transmitter is located in Zapata, Texas and broadcasts regional Mexican music with a power of 4.5 kW. The station's signal does not reach Laredo, Texas because the signal is too weak.

KJJS is owned by Hispanic Target Media Inc.
