= KAAJ-LP =

- Monticello, Utah; United States
- Broadcast area: Metro Monticello
- Frequency: 103.9 MHz
- Branding: 103.9 KAAJ

Programming
- Format: Religious
- Affiliations: USA Radio News

Ownership
- Owner: First Baptist Church of Monticello, Utah; (First Baptist Church)

History
- First air date: August 2, 2006
- Call sign meaning: Knowing and Adoring Jesus (is Life's Purpose)

Technical information
- Licensing authority: FCC
- Facility ID: 123728
- Class: L1
- ERP: 100 watts
- HAAT: −55 meters (−180 ft)
- Transmitter coordinates: 37°52′42.90″N 109°20′27.40″W

Links
- Public license information: LMS
- Webcast: Listen live

KAAJ-LP is a religious radio station in Monticello in Utah. KAAJ-LP is owned by First Baptist Church of Monticello, Utah, and operated under their First Baptist Church licensee.

== History ==
This station received its original construction permit for 103.5 FM from the Federal Communications Commission on May 7, 2001. The new station was assigned the call letters KAAJ-LP by the FCC on August 23, 2001. KAAJ-LP received its license to cover at 103.5 FM from the FCC on January 28, 2003.

In June 2005, KAAJ-LP applied to change its licensed broadcast frequency to 103.9 FM. It received a new construction permit from the FCC on September 7, 2005. KAAJ-LP received its license to cover at 103.9 FM from the FCC on August 2, 2006. The station applied for and received the renewal of its license on September 27, 2013.

== Programming ==
The station airs a religious format including a mix of nationally syndicated religious teaching programs, syndicated music programs and talk shows, local news and community information, plus hourly news updates from USA Radio News. In addition, KAAJ-LP airs live broadcasts of Monticello City Council sessions and of Monticello High School football and basketball games.
