= WPPL =

- Blue Ridge, Georgia; United States
- Frequency: 103.9 MHz
- Branding: Mountain Country 103.9 & 94.3

Programming
- Format: Country music
- Affiliations: AP Radio; Dial Global

Ownership
- Owner: Peter Michael Galinski; (WPPL Mountain Country Radio, LLC)

Technical information
- Licensing authority: FCC
- Facility ID: 21152
- Class: A
- ERP: 5,500 watts
- HAAT: 104.0 meters
- Transmitter coordinates: 34°52′3.00″N 84°20′2.00″W
- Translator: 94.3 W232BD (Blairsville)

Links
- Public license information: Public file; LMS
- Website: mountaincountryradio.com

WPPL (103.9 FM) is a radio station broadcasting a country music format. Licensed to Blue Ridge, Georgia, United States, the station is currently owned by Peter Michael Galinski, through licensee WPPL Mountain Country Radio, LLC, and features programming from AP Radio and Dial Global.

Former logo
