= WJUP-LP =

Radio station in Florida, United States

- Jupiter, Florida; United States
- Frequency: 103.9 MHz

Ownership
- Owner: Jupiter Community Radio

History
- Former call signs: WJTW-LP (2003–2015)
- Former frequencies: 100.3 MHz (2003–2013)
- Call sign meaning: JUPiter

Technical information
- Licensing authority: FCC
- Facility ID: 133909
- Class: L1
- ERP: 100 watts
- HAAT: 23.0 meters (75.5 ft)
- Transmitter coordinates: 26°55′34.20950″N 80°05′54.15210″W

Links
- Public license information: LMS

WJUP-LP (103.9 FM) is a radio station licensed to Jupiter, Florida, United States. The station is currently owned by Jupiter Community Radio.
