= WWEO-LP =

- DeFuniak Springs, Florida; United States
- Broadcast area: Ft. Walton Beach, Florida
- Frequency: 103.9 MHz

Programming
- Format: Religious

Ownership
- Owner: Emanuel Communications

Technical information
- Licensing authority: FCC
- Facility ID: 134645
- Class: L1
- ERP: 26 watts
- HAAT: 56.8 meters
- Transmitter coordinates: 30°44′18.00″N 86°06′22.00″W

Links
- Public license information: LMS

WWEO-LP (103.9 FM) is a radio station broadcasting a religious radio format. Licensed to DeFuniak Springs, Florida, United States, the station serves the Ft. Walton Beach, Florida, area. The station is currently owned by Emanuel Communications.
