= WLCV-LP =

- Ludington, Michigan; United States
- Frequency: 103.9 MHz
- Branding: Ludington Catholic Voice

Programming
- Format: Catholic radio

Ownership
- Owner: Ludington Area Catholic School

History
- Call sign meaning: W Ludington Catholic Voice

Technical information
- Licensing authority: FCC
- Facility ID: 196488
- Class: LP1
- ERP: 58 watts
- HAAT: 40 metres (130 ft)
- Transmitter coordinates: 43°56′57.0″N 86°27′00.3″W

Links
- Public license information: LMS
- Webcast: Listen live
- Website: stsimonchurch.com/ludington-catholic-voice-radio-1039-fm

WLCV-LP (103.9 FM, "Ludington Catholic Voice") is a radio station licensed to serve the community of Ludington, Michigan. The station is owned by Ludington Area Catholic School and airs a Catholic radio format.

The station was assigned the WLCV-LP call letters by the Federal Communications Commission on October 5, 2015.
