= Effingham, Kansas =

- City
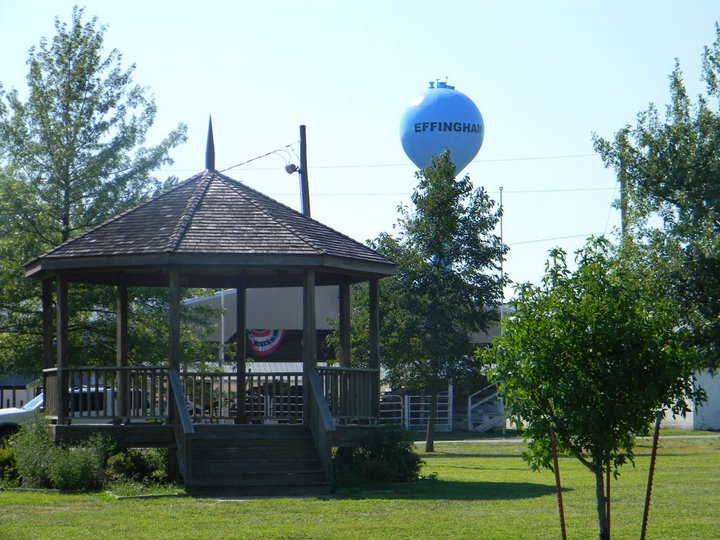
- Effingham Water Tower (2010)

- Location within Atchison County and Kansas

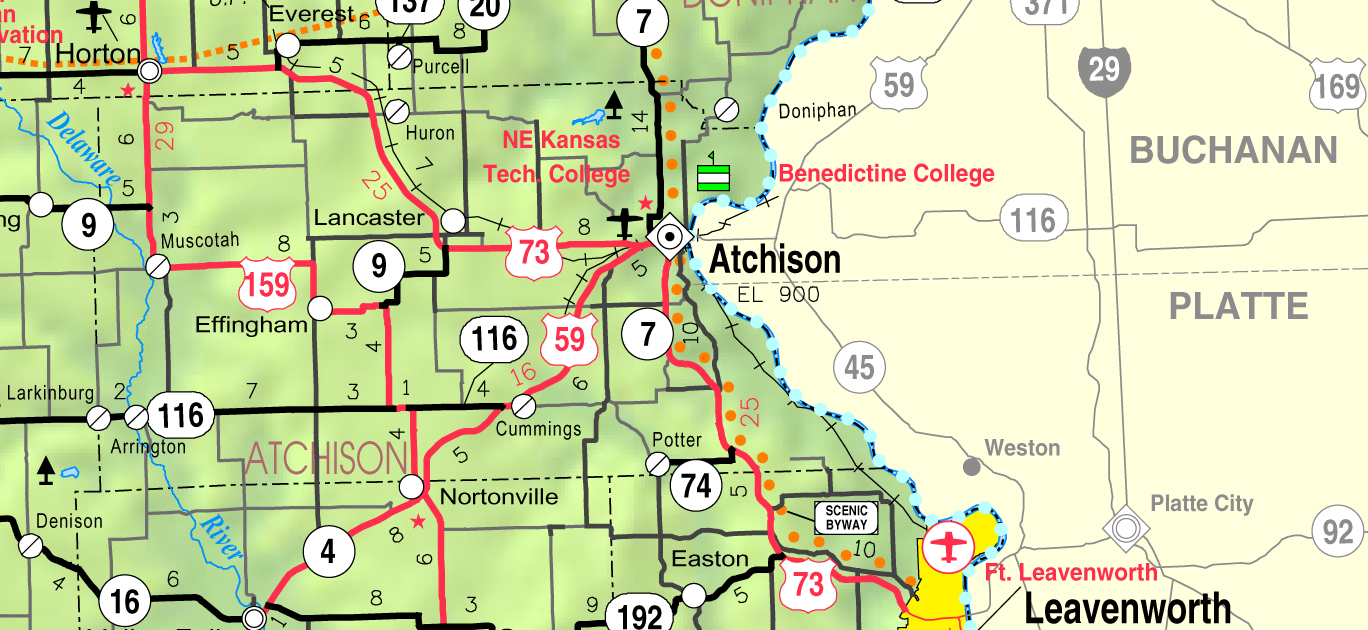
- KDOT map of Atchison County (legend)
- Coordinates: 39°31′22″N 95°23′49″W
- Country: United States
- State: Kansas
- County: Atchison
- Township: Benton

Area
  - Total: 0.62 sq mi (1.60 km^{2})
  - Land: 0.62 sq mi (1.60 km^{2})
  - Water: 0 sq mi (0.00 km^{2})
- Elevation: 1,139 ft (347 m)

Population (2020)
  - Total: 495
  - Density: 801/sq mi (309/km^{2})
- Time zone: UTC−6 (CST)
  - Summer (DST): UTC−5 (CDT)
- ZIP Code: 66023
- Area code: 913
- FIPS code: 20-20025
- GNIS ID: 2394629

Effingham is a city in Benton Township, Atchison County, Kansas, United States. As of the 2020 census, the population was 495.

== History ==
The first post office in Effingham was established in 1868. The current city experienced growth when the Central Branch Union Pacific Railroad was built through the neighborhood and by the 1880s was a thriving village. It was named in honor of Effingham H. Nichols, an early promoter of the Central Branch Union Pacific Railroad.

== Geography ==
According to the United States Census Bureau, the city has a total area of 0.53 square miles (1.37 km^{2}), all land.

== Demographics ==
Historical population
Census	Pop.	Note	%±
1880	187		—
1890	361		93.0%
1900	634		75.6%
1910	674		6.3%
1920	616		−8.6%
1930	646		4.9%
1940	676		4.6%
1950	525		−22.3%
1960	564		7.4%
1970	605		7.3%
1980	634		4.8%
1990	540		−14.8%
2000	588		8.9%
2010	546		−7.1%
2020	495		−9.3%
U.S. Decennial Census

=== 2020 census ===
The 2020 United States census counted 495 people, 202 households, and 132 families in Effingham. The population density was 799.7 per square mile (308.8/km^{2}). There were 233 housing units at an average density of 376.4 per square mile (145.3/km^{2}). The racial makeup was 90.91% (450) white or European American (90.3% non-Hispanic white), 1.01% (5) black or African-American, 0.61% (3) Native American or Alaska Native, 0.2% (1) Asian, 0.0% (0) Pacific Islander or Native Hawaiian, 0.0% (0) from other races, and 7.27% (36) from two or more races. Hispanic or Latino of any race was 1.41% (7) of the population.

Of the 202 households, 33.2% had children under the age of 18; 47.5% were married couples living together; 25.7% had a female householder with no spouse or partner present. 30.2% of households consisted of individuals and 18.8% had someone living alone who was 65 years of age or older. The average household size was 2.0 and the average family size was 2.8. The percent of those with a bachelor's degree or higher was estimated to be 8.7% of the population.

28.3% of the population was under the age of 18, 7.3% from 18 to 24, 22.4% from 25 to 44, 22.6% from 45 to 64, and 19.4% who were 65 years of age or older. The median age was 38.8 years. For every 100 females, there were 98.8 males. For every 100 females ages 18 and older, there were 111.3 males.

The 2016-2020 5-year American Community Survey estimates show that the median household income was $45,714 (with a margin of error of +/- $4,857) and the median family income was $65,833 (+/- $6,492). Males had a median income of $32,308 (+/- $11,951) versus $22,083 (+/- $5,782) for females. The median income for those above 16 years old was $28,684 (+/- $5,740). Approximately, 1.7% of families and 6.1% of the population were below the poverty line, including 6.9% of those under the age of 18 and 9.2% of those ages 65 or over.

=== 2010 census ===
As of the census of 2010, there were 546 people, 217 households, and 141 families living in the city. The population density was 1,030.2 inhabitants per square mile (397.8/km^{2}). There were 252 housing units at an average density of 475.5 per square mile (183.6/km^{2}). The racial makeup of the city was 96.0% White, 1.6% African American, 0.9% Native American, 0.4% from other races, and 1.1% from two or more races. Hispanic or Latino of any race were 2.9% of the population.

There were 217 households, of which 35.0% had children under the age of 18 living with them, 51.6% were married couples living together, 10.1% had a female householder with no husband present, 3.2% had a male householder with no wife present, and 35.0% were non-families. 31.3% of all households were made up of individuals, and 15.7% had someone living alone who was 65 years of age or older. The average household size was 2.52 and the average family size was 3.23.

The median age in the city was 36.6 years. 30.2% of residents were under the age of 18; 5.2% were between the ages of 18 and 24; 26.4% were from 25 to 44; 19.7% were from 45 to 64; and 18.5% were 65 years of age or older. The gender makeup of the city was 49.3% male and 50.7% female.

== Education ==
The community is served by Atchison County USD 377 public school district. Older students attend Atchison County Community High School.
