= KOZA (FM) =

- Effingham, Kansas; United States
- Broadcast area: Topeka; Lawrence
- Frequency: 96.9 MHz
- Branding: 96.9 Pulse Radio

Programming
- Format: Hot adult contemporary
- Affiliations: Compass Media Networks

Ownership
- Owner: Many Signals Communications; (KNZA, Inc.)

History
- First air date: March 12, 2008 (as KDVB)
- Former call signs: KDVB (2008–2022); KQRB (2022–2024)

Technical information
- Licensing authority: FCC
- Facility ID: 164159
- Class: C2
- ERP: 50,000 watts
- HAAT: 114 meters (374 ft)
- Transmitter coordinates: 39°15′41″N 95°39′21″W

Links
- Public license information: Public file; LMS
- Webcast: Listen live
- Website: kozafm.com

KOZA (96.9 MHz) is a commercial FM radio station licensed to Effingham, Kansas, and serving the Topeka and Lawrence areas of Northeast Kansas. It airs a hot adult contemporary format and is owned by Many Signals Communications. The studios are located on Southwest 29th Street in Topeka.

KOZA has an effective radiated power (ERP) of 50,000 watts. The transmitter is on U4 Road at 118th Road in Hoyt.

== History ==
The station, originally KDVB, was formerly owned and operated by Cumulus Media. Cumulus won the station's license in a U.S. Federal Communications Commission (FCC) auction in 2004 where it was originally to operate on 96.7 FM in Humboldt, Nebraska. Cumulus applied to move it to Effingham, Kansas, as a Class C2 in 2007, but only built it out as a low-powered Class A. That happened once Cumulus canceled its plans to move KMAJ-FM into the Kansas City market (as Cumulus acquired Susquehanna Broadcasting the year prior). That prevented the company from fitting KDVB within the ownership limits in its Topeka cluster. During its time under Cumulus ownership, KDVB operated as a repeater of KDVV. Cumulus had obtained a construction permit from the FCC for a power increase to 8,100 watts effective radiated power. The permit expired on January 11, 2013. A new application was filed that day.

On September 30, 2021, Cumulus Media sold KDVB for $300,000 to Intrepid Companies. Intrepid was managed by Don Sherman, previously the owner of KSJM in the Wichita market. Nine days later, KDVB went silent. Intrepid filed an application with the Federal Communications Commission to move the station's transmitter to a site near Hoyt, re-classify the station as a Class C2, and upgrade the station's power to 50,000 watts. The application was approved on April 25, 2022. On June 26, radio news website RadioInsight disclosed that Intrepid had applied to change the station's callsign to KQRB. The change took effect on June 28. On July 11, the station, now with the KQRB call letters, returned to the air and began stunting with a broad mix of music and construction sounds ahead of a new format set to launch on July 14 at noon. At that time, KQRB debuted an urban format consisting of a mix of hip-hop, R&B, and old school music branded as "96.9 The Beat", which launched with 1,969 songs commercial free, with "In the Stone" by Earth, Wind & Fire being the first song played. The station featured the syndicated DeDe in the Morning, Big Boy's Neighborhood in middays, The Baka Boyz Daily in evenings, and Sunday Night Slow Jams with R. Dub on weeknights and Sunday nights.

On March 29, 2024, Intrepid announced they would sell KQRB to Hiawatha-based Many Signals Communications, which owns five radio stations in Northeast Kansas and Southeast Nebraska, for $670,000. Ahead of the closing of the sale, Intrepid and Many Signals agreed to coordinate on a call letter change to KOZA for the station, which would take effect upon the closing of the sale. In addition, Many Signals announced the station would flip to a hot adult contemporary format.

On June 17, 2024, Many Signals closed on the purchase of KQRB, and flipped the station to hot AC, branded as "96.9 Pulse Radio". In addition, the station changed call letters to KOZA the following day.
