= KNUT =

Radio station in Tamuning, Guam

- Tamuning, Guam; Guam
- Frequency: 101.1 MHz
- Branding: Star 101 FM

Programming
- Format: Rhythmic contemporary

Ownership
- Owner: Choice Broadcasting Company
- Sister stations: KIJI, KUSG (AM)

History
- First air date: 1999 (as KBLB)
- Former call signs: KBLB (1999); KCNM-FM (1999-2010)

Technical information
- Licensing authority: FCC
- Facility ID: 77695
- Class: C2
- ERP: 8,000 watts
- HAAT: 193 meters (633 ft)
- Transmitter coordinates: 15°11′0″N 145°44′6″E

Links
- Public license information: Public file; LMS
- Website: https://star101.gu/

KNUT (101.1 FM), branded as "Star 101 FM", is a radio station broadcasting as a Rhythmic top 40 format, and it is now located in Tamuning, Guam area. The station is currently owned by Choice Broadcasting Company.

== History ==
=== KBLB and KCNM-FM (1999–2010) ===
The station was launched in 1999 as KBLB in Saipan, Northern Mariana Islands and operated under that name through most of the year. The FM station was assigned the callsign KCNM-FM by the Federal Communications Commission on October 7, 1999, and changed them to the current KNUT on July 14, 2010, for the Island music.

=== Fun 101 FM (2012–2016) ===
As of February 15, 2012, KNUT was transfer from Saipan, Northern Mariana Islands to Tamuning, Guam and became as "Fun 101 FM" for the Original Pilipino Music, Top 40, and K-pop for the Filipino station.

=== Star 101 ===
On October 3, 2016, at around 3 AM, KNUT flipped to Top 40/CHR as "Star 101," giving Guam its fourth Top 40.

In September 2019, the station switch to its current Rhythmic CHR format

== DJs ==
=== Current ===
- JED
- Jon Palau
- Shawnzy B.

=== Former ===
- Kristine "Kai" Young
- Donna D (moved to KIJI and KUSG (AM))
- Aaron Tamayo
- Blake Watson
- The Real Joe Cruz
- Ryan the Mixologist
- Kyle Mandapat
