= KMZA =

- Seneca, Kansas; United States
- Frequency: 92.1 MHz
- Branding: Kanzaland Radio

Programming
- Format: Classic country
- Affiliations: Fox News Radio

Ownership
- Owner: KNZA, Inc.

History
- First air date: 1992

Technical information
- Licensing authority: FCC
- Facility ID: 35287
- Class: A
- ERP: 4,000 watts
- HAAT: 123 meters (404 ft)
- Transmitter coordinates: 39°49′33″N 96°01′46″W

Links
- Public license information: Public file; LMS
- Webcast: Listen live
- Website: www.kmzafm.com

KMZA (92.1 FM) is a radio station airing a classic country format licensed to Seneca, Kansas, United States. The station is owned by KNZA, Inc.
