= List of defunct colleges and universities in Kansas =

The following is a list of defunct universities and colleges in Kansas. This list includes accredited, degree-granting institutions and bona fide institutions of higher learning that operated before accreditation existed. All have hosted their primary campus within the state of Kansas, and all have since discontinued operations or their operations were taken over by another similar institution of higher learning.

== List details ==
=== Time of operation ===
==== Length of operation ====
Eight of the schools operated for more than 50 years. Brown Mackie College was able to function for 125 years before closing. The shortest length of operation was less than two years by Bethel Bible College (1900–1901), followed by three years for Concordia Normal School (1874–1876). At least four of the schools began operations before Kansas was admitted into the union (January 29, 1861).

Records for several of the schools have yet to be located and verified at this time of this writing to accurately determine how long the schools operated.

One school, Garfield University, actually opened and closed its doors twice.

==== Earliest and latest ====
The earliest verified to open was St. Mary's College in 1848, while the most recent to open was The Way College of Emporia in 1975. The earliest on record to close was Blue Mont Central College in 1863. The most recent four-year college closure was St. Mary of the Plains College in 1992. The most recent two-year programs to close are Wright Career College in 2016 and Brown Mackie College in 2017.

=== University vs college/school ===
Of the 64 institutes on the list, each chose a different method of naming itself:

- 45 took the name "college"
- 6 claimed "university" in their title
- 6 named themselves a "school"
- 2 were called a "seminary"
- 2 were "conservatories"
- 1 was an "institute"
- 1 did not have any such name in its title (Mount St. Scholastica) but was considered a "college"

=== Name considerations and locations ===
Three of the schools have some variation of "Saint Mary" in the name of the school: St. Mary's College, St. Mary of the Plains College, and Marymount. This can become even more confusing because there are two active colleges/universities in Kansas that have some variation of "Saint Mary" in their names: University of Saint Mary (Leavenworth) and St. Mary's College (St. Marys), the latter which is at the same location of one of the previous "Saint Mary" colleges.

Also in the same location and with similar names were The College of Emporia and The Way College of Emporia. The first school ceased operations and then sold the grounds to The Way International, which operated a school afterward. Critics accused the second school of attempting to use the history of the first to give a perception of value and credibility on the second.

Other colleges with similar names include the several normal schools and business colleges. The College of the Sisters of Bethany is somewhat similar in name but otherwise unrelated to Bethany College in Lindsborg.

Aside from the two Emporia colleges, schools that shared locations were the former Kansas Technical Institute and the current Kansas State University – Salina; the site for Garfield University later became Friends University; and St. John's College was located just a few blocks from Southwestern College. Other schools may also have shared property/buildings during location and relocation efforts during closing of the schools.

One school relocated outside of the state: Midland College originated in Atchison and then relocated to Wahoo, Nebraska where it eventually merged with other schools.

=== Athletic programs ===
See List of college athletic programs in Kansas

Several of the schools maintained active athletic programs during their time of operation.

Team	School	City	Conference (at time of discontinuation)
Brown Mackie-Salina Lions	Brown Mackie College	Salina	Independent
College of Emporia Fighting Presbies	College of Emporia	Emporia	Heart of America
Marymount Spartans	Marymount	Salina	
St. John's Johnnies	St. John's College	Winfield	Kansas
St. Mary of the Plains Cavaliers	St. Mary of the Plains	Dodge City	Kansas

=== Included exceptions ===
There are a few inclusions in the list that are exceptions to the inclusion rule—most noticeably Utopia College. Utopia did not grant "degrees" but operated as a "college" for an extended period of time. Also, there are multiple business colleges that may not have been considered degree-granting institutions. In the interest of being as complete as possible, such schools are listed.

== Defunct colleges and universities in Kansas ==
This list may be incomplete. You can help Wikipedia by expanding it.

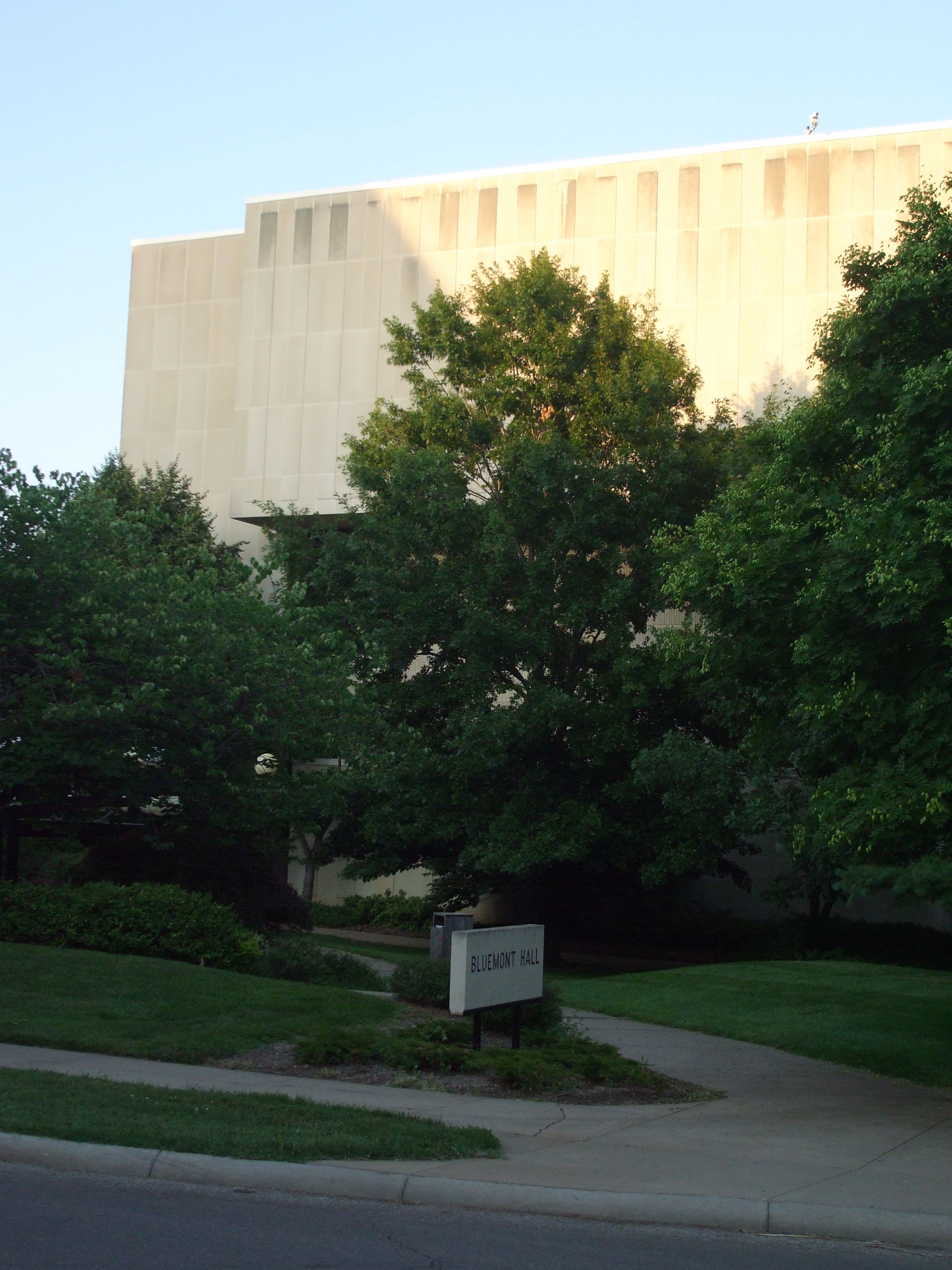
Bluemont Hall at Kansas State University, named to honor Blue Mont Central College

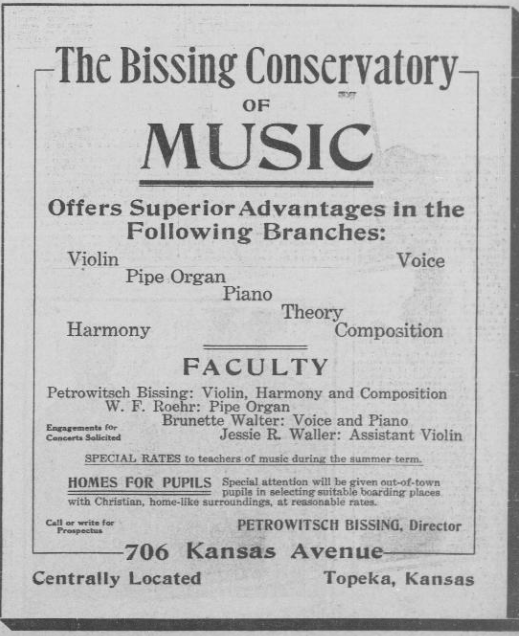
1909 Advertisement in Topeka State Journal for the Bissing Conservatory of Music

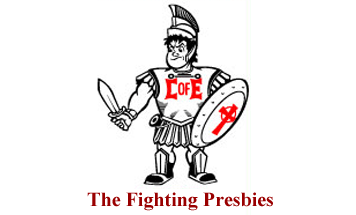
"Presbie Pete" mascot of the College of Emporia

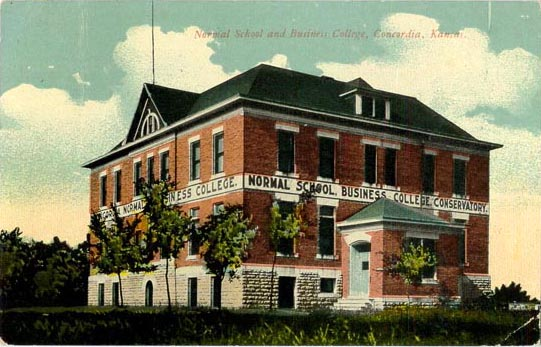
Great Western Business and Normal College

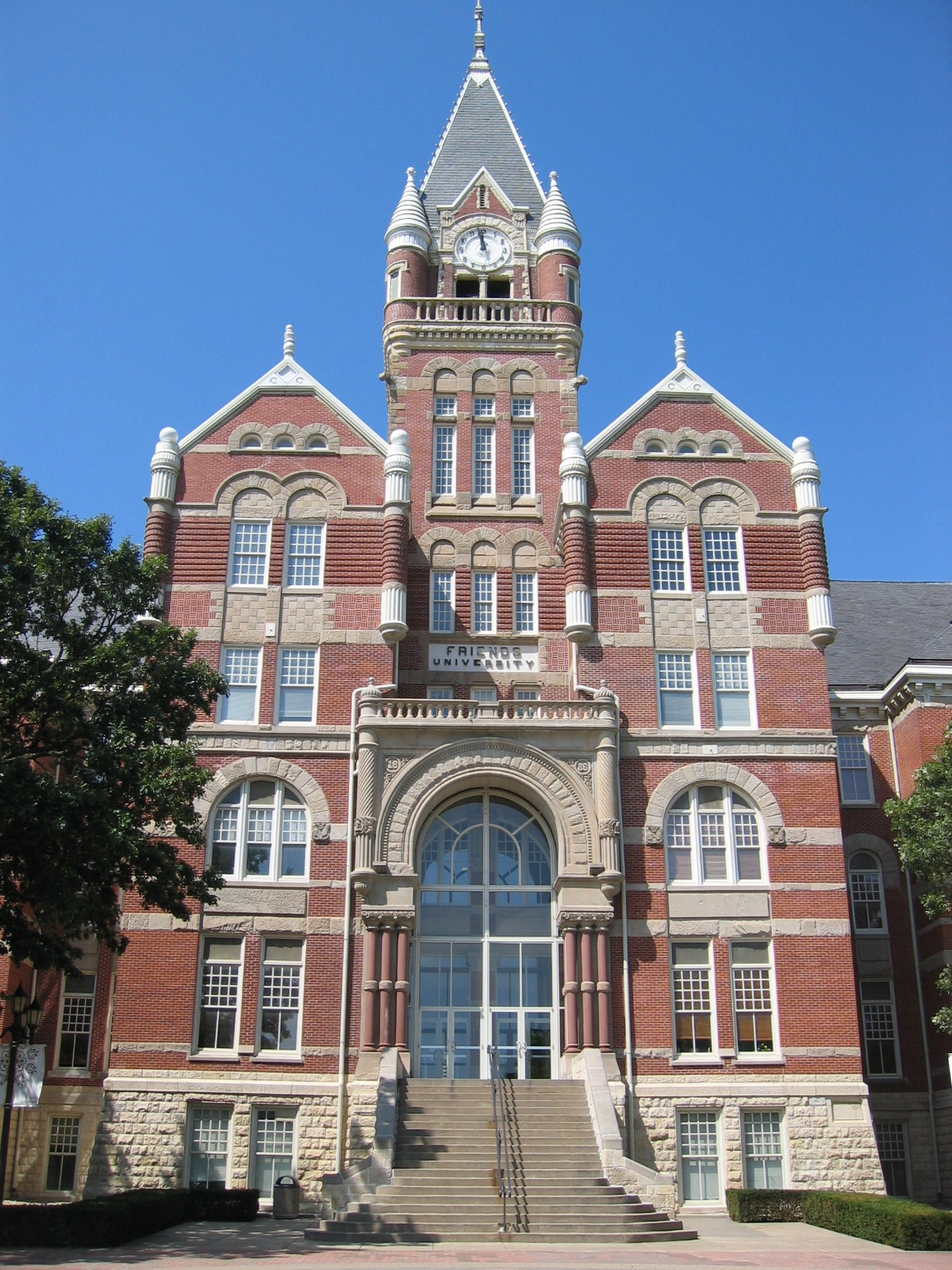
Davis Hall at Friends University, original site of Garfield University

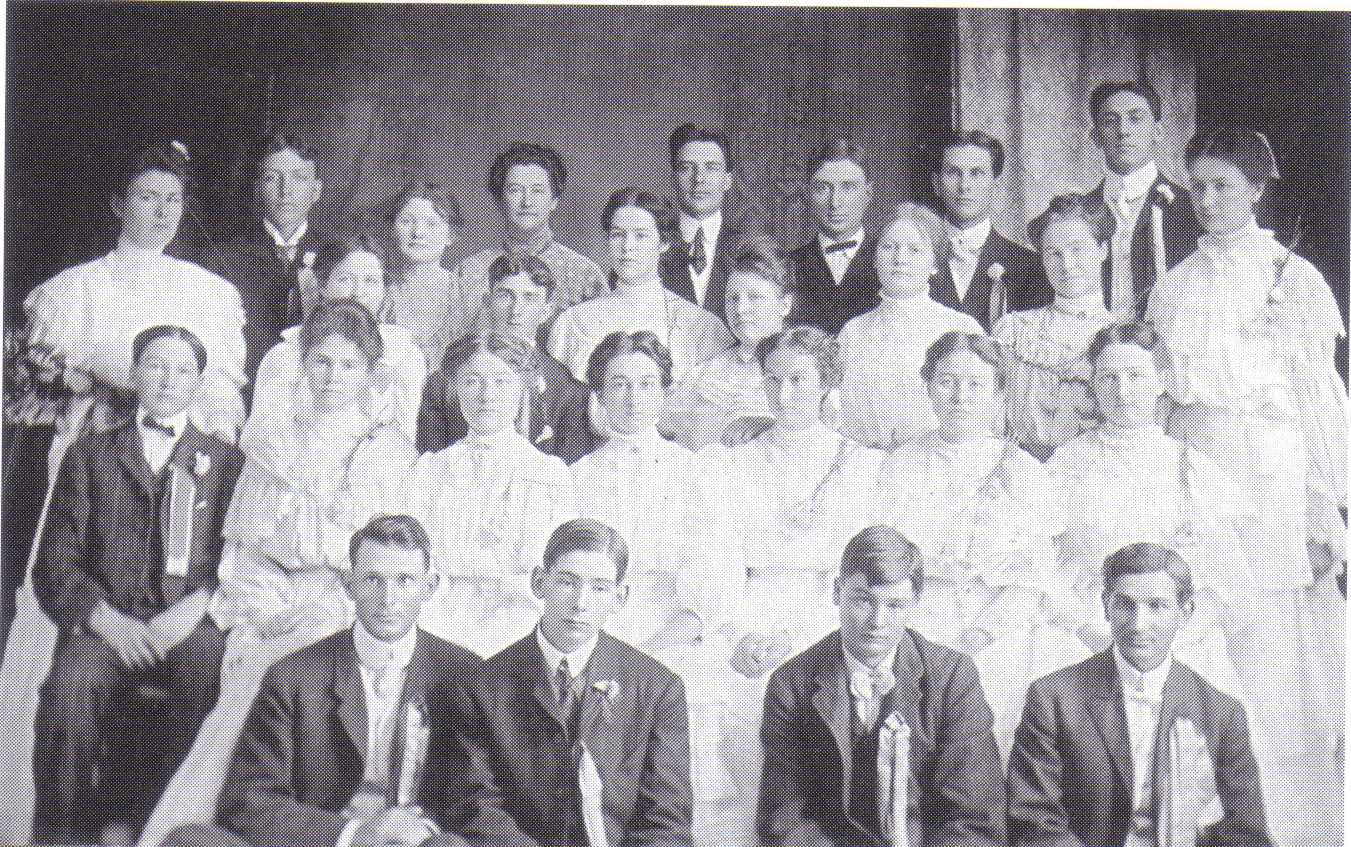
Great Western Business and Normal College class of 1905.

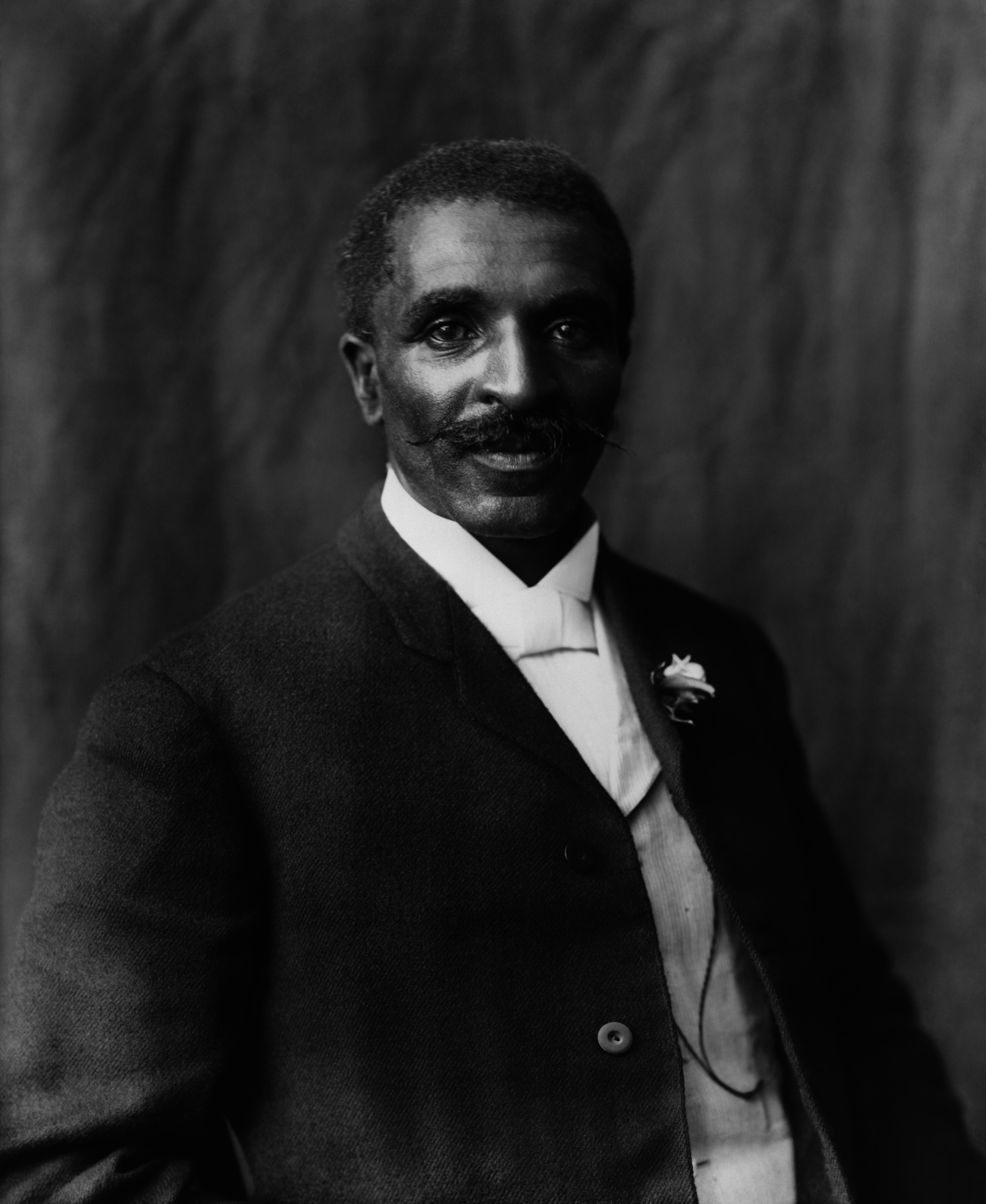
George Washington Carver applied to and was accepted by Highland University, but upon arrival they turned him away because of his race.

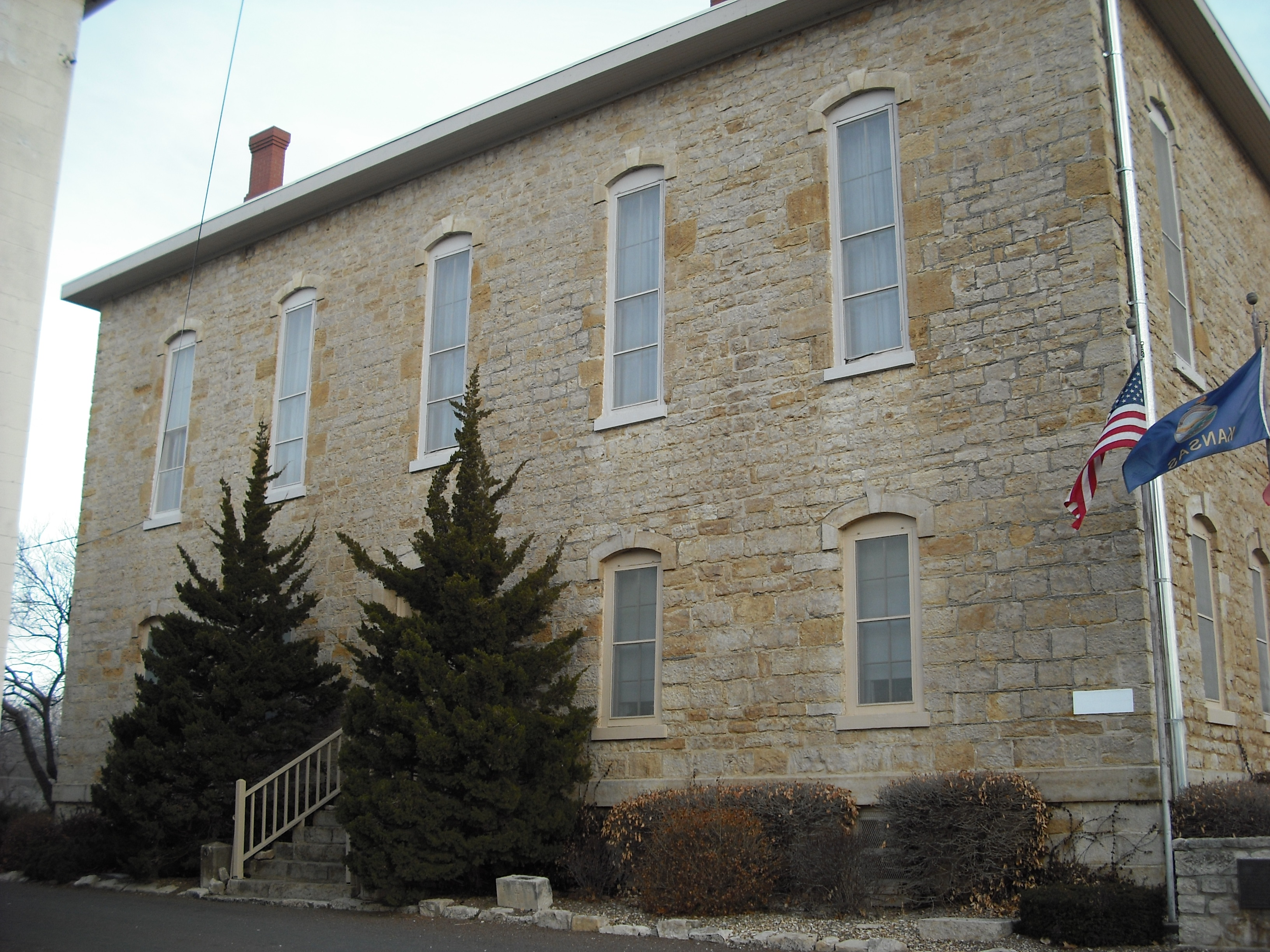
Lane University and territorial capital museum

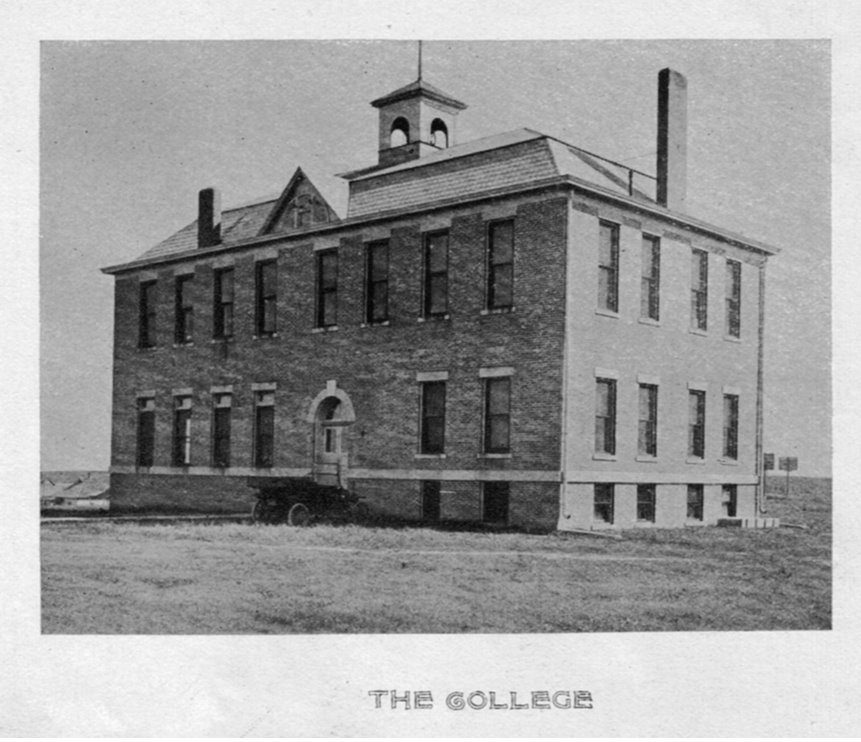
Miltonvale Wesleyan College, main building 1915

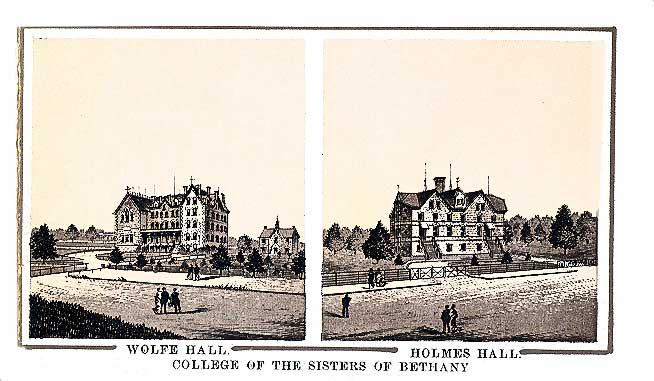
College of the Sisters of Bethany postcard showing Wolfe Hall and Holmes Hall

College/University	Location	Opened	Closed	Notes
Atchison Business College	Atchison	1885	??	Listing found The school fielded a college football team for at least two years (1892 and 1902).
Bethel Bible College	Topeka	1900	1901	Sometimes called "Parham School of Tongues" - founded by evangelist Charles Fox Parham.
Bissing's Conservatory of Music	Hays; Topeka	1901	??	Established by violinist Petrowitsch Bissing, shown operating as of 1918. Began in Hays and relocated later in Topeka.
Blue Mont Central College	Manhattan	1858	1863	Kansas State University named Bluemont Hall to honor the College
Bresee Theological College	Hutchinson	1905	1940	Closed in 1940 to merge with Bethany-Peniel College.
Brown Mackie College	Salina	1892	2017	On June 11, 2016, 22 of 26 Brown Mackie campuses began closing. The remaining campuses were sold in 2017.
Campbell College	Holton	1880	1913	Merged with Kansas City University which later also closed
Central Normal College	Great Bend	1888	1902	Independent normal school
College of Emporia	Emporia	1882	1974	Nationally known for its College football team's innovative play and success: see College of Emporia Fighting Presbies football
College of the Sisters of Bethany	Topeka	1861	1928	Chartered before Kansas became a state. Was originally named Episcopal Female Seminary of Topeka but changed name around the time the school re-chartered in 1870.
Concordia Normal School	Concordia	1874	1876	Lost state funding and did not survive. State normal schools were consolidated to what is now Emporia State University
Conway Springs Normal and Business College	Conway Springs	??	??	Listing found
Draughon's Practical Business College	??	??	??	Listing found
Emporia Business College	Emporia	??	??	Listing found
Fort Scott Normal School	Fort Scott	1878	??	Sometimes called Kansas Normal School or Kansas Normal School of Fort Scott One student that studied there was born in 1867. Listed as closed in 1905
Garfield University	Wichita	1888	1890	Named for United States President James A. Garfield. The school struggled financially from the beginning. Closed once and then re-opened in 1892 officially chartered as "Central Memorial University" but still maintained the name "Garfield"—and closed again. In 1898, passed property to what would become Friends University.
G.A.R. Memorial National College	Oberlin	1891	??	Established by five women of the Women's Relief Corps and endorsed by the Grand Army of the Republic posts of Kansas for the free education of soldiers' and sailors' children. It was said to have been the only such college of its kind in the United States.
Great Western Business and Normal College	Concordia	1889	??	Founded by L. H. Hausam, sometimes called "Concordia Business College" or "Concordia Normal and Business College"—Private, different than the state operated "Concordia Normal School"
Harper Normal and Business College	Harper	??	??	Listed closed as of 1905
Highland University	Highland	1856	??	established for the Sac and Fox Nation under the Presbyterian church Highland Community College claims that its roots date back to this university and thus claims to be "the first College in Kansas."
Iola Business College	Iola	1899	??	Listing found
Kansas Christian College	Lincoln	1882	1913	Listing found
Kansas City Baptist Theological Seminary	Kansas City	1901	??	Later became a part of Central Baptist Theological Seminary of Kansas City.
Kansas City College of Physicians and Surgeons	Kansas City	??	1905	Merged with what is now the University of Kansas to become KU Med Center
Kansas City University	Kansas City	1896	1933	This school, located in Kansas City, Kansas should not be confused with UMKC, which was also sometimes historically called "Kansas City University" and is located across the state line in Kansas City, Missouri.
Kansas Technical Institute	Salina	1965	1991	Merged with Kansas State University to form Kansas State University – Salina College of Technology and Aviation
Lane University	Lecompton	1865	1902	Merged with Campbell College which later also closed
Lawrence Business College	Lawrence	1869	??	Listing found
Leavenworth Business College	Leavenworth	1887	??	Listing found
Leavenworth Normal School	Leavenworth	1870	1876	Lost state funding and did not survive, state normal schools were consolidated to what is now Emporia State University
Manhattan Business College	Manhattan	1908	1924	
Marymount College (Kansas)	Salina	1922	1989	Records sent to St. Mary of the Plains College which also closed (see below)
Midland College	Atchison	1887	1962	In 1919, the College moved to Fremont, Nebraska to the site of the former Fremont Normal School and Business College. In 1962, Midland merged with Luther Junior College founded in Wahoo, Nebraska, in 1883. Midland College then became Midland Lutheran College.
Miltonvale Wesleyan College	Miltonvale	1909	1972	Ceased operation in 1972 when the school merged with Bartlesville Wesleyan College—later to become a part of Oklahoma Wesleyan University.
Modern Normal School	Marysville	??	??	Listed in a directory published in 1905
Moline College	Moline	??	??	Listing found
Mount St. Scholastica	Atchison	1923	1971	Merged with St. Benedict's College to form Benedictine College
National Business College	Coffeyville	??	??	Listing found
National Business College	Hiawatha	??	??	Listing found
National Business College	Kansas City	??	??	Listing found
Nemaha Commercial College	Seneca	1900	??	Listing found
Nickerson Normal School	Nickerson	1898	??	Independent normal school
Oswego College for Young Women	Oswego	1883	??	Sometimes referred to as Oswego College or Oswego College for Young Ladies
Ottawa Business College	Ottawa	??	??	Listing found
Ottumwa College	Ottumwa	1864	1872	Organized by the Methodist Episcopal Church, later under control of the Christian Church. Only building burned to the ground on July 24, 1872.
Parsons Business College	Parsons	1892	??	Listing found
Pittsburg Business College	Pittsburg	1894	??	Listing found The school had a football team in 1908, losing one game to local college team Pittsburg State University.
Salina Normal University	Salina	1884	1904	Destroyed by fire in 1904 and was not rebuilt
Salt City Business College	Hutchinson	1897	??	Listing found The school had a football team in 1907 and 1908.
Skelton's School of Telegraphy and Railway Business	Salina	1887	1909	Early adopter of teaching both telegraph and typewriter skills to students. Became a Union Pacific Railroad school in 1909 and turned over to Kansas Wesleyan Business College.
Soule College	Dodge City	1894	??	Advertised board for $2 per week and tuition for $24 per year.
St. Benedict's College	Atchison	1859	1971	Merged with Mount St. Scholastica to form Benedictine College
St. John's College	Winfield	1893	1986	Maintains an active alumni association
St. Mary of the Plains College	Dodge City	1913	1992	Maintains an active alumni association
St. Mary's College	St. Marys	1848	1968	A second College presently exists at the same location also named St. Mary's College"
The Way College of Emporia	Emporia	1975	1989	Same location as College of Emporia. Attempted a legal battle to gain the endowment of the previous college and lost. Enrollment dwindled around 90 students.
Topeka Business College	Topeka	??	??	Listing found
Utopia College	Eureka	1946	1970s	Granted only "certificates"
Western Musical Conservatory	Emporia	1871	??	Listing found
Western Theological Seminary	Atchison	1893	??	Evangelical Lutheran college, listed as operational as of 1902.
Western University	Quindaro	1864	1943	Earliest historically black college or university west of the Mississippi River
Wichita Business College	Wichita	1901	??	Listing found The school had a football team in 1901 and 1902.
Wichita Commercial College	Wichita	1893	??	Listing found
Windsor Commercial College	Fort Scott	1897	??	Listing found
Winfield Business and Academic College	Winfield	1894	??	Listing found
Wright Career College	Overland Park	1921	2016	Founded in 1921 as Dickinson's Business School. One thousand students and 200 staff members at five campuses locations were affected when the school abruptly closed its doors. All students were notified by email on a Thursday evening that the school would not be open the next day.

== See also ==
- List of colleges and universities in Kansas
- List of college athletic programs in Kansas
- List of high schools in Kansas
