= List of people from Hutchinson, Kansas =

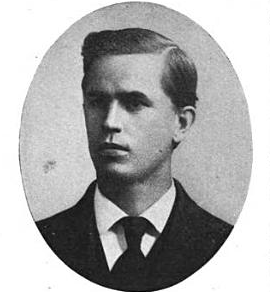
L. H. Hausam was president of the Hausam School of Penmanship and resided in Hutchinson.

The following is a list of notable individuals who were born in or have lived in Hutchinson, Kansas.

== Academia ==
- Jane Smisor Bastien (1936–2018), music teacher and author
- Dale L. Boger (born 1953), organic chemist
- L. H. Hausam (1870–1941), president of the Hausam School of Penmanship and founder of Great Western Business and Normal College
- William Lee Miller (1926–2012), historian, political ethics professor
- Erik N. Rasmussen (born 1957), atmospheric scientist and tornado expert
- Fred Soper (1893–1977), epidemiologist
- Howard Swearer (1932–1991), educator
- Pat Woodrum (born 1941), librarian

== Arts and entertainment ==
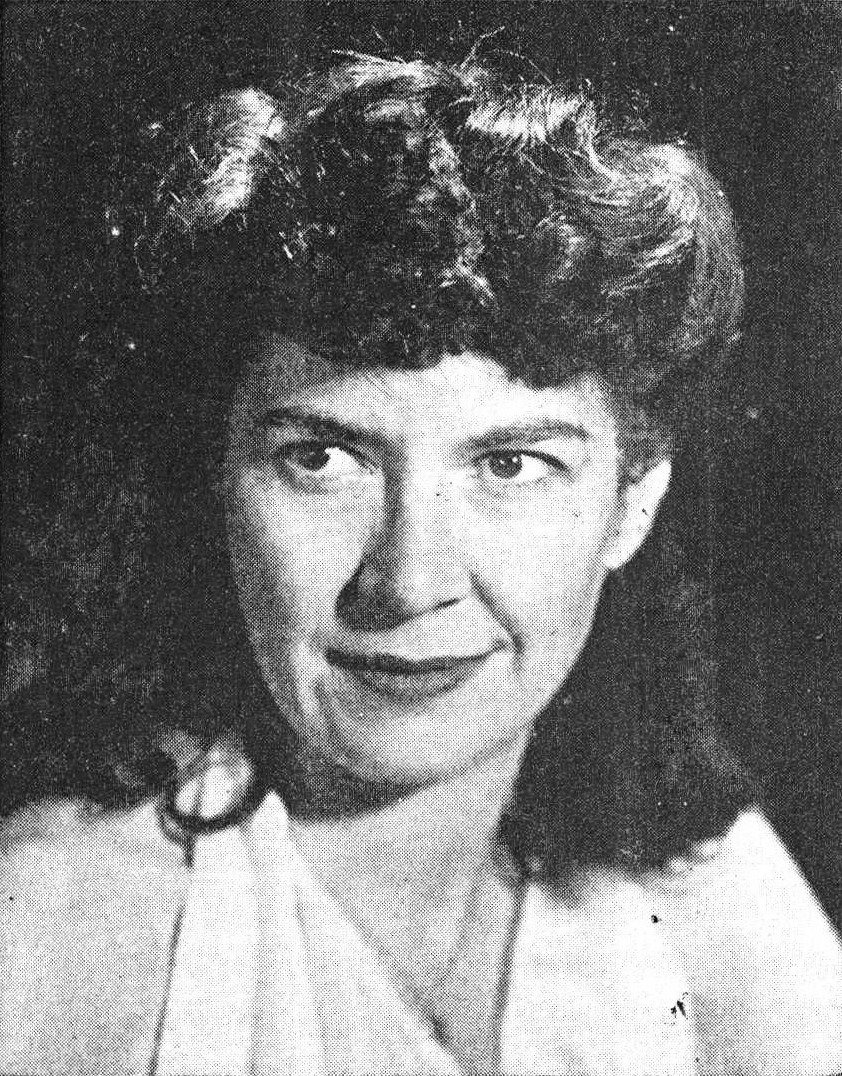
Margaret St. Clair, science fiction novelist

=== Fashion ===
- Julie Woodson (born 1950), model

=== Film, television, and theatre ===
- Kay Alden (born 1946), screenwriter
- Mitch Brian (born 1961), screenwriter
- Aneta Corsaut (1933–1995), actress
- Racquel Darrian (born 1968), pornographic actress
- Lucinda Dickey (born 1960), actress, dancer
- Richard Thorpe (1896–1991), film director

=== Journalism ===
- Michael Grant (born 1951), journalist
- Fred Kaplan (born 1954), author, journalist
- James B. Steele (born 1943), author, journalist

=== Literature ===
- Scott Heim (born 1966), novelist
- Margaret St. Clair (1911–1995), science fiction writer, novelist
- William Mark Simmons (born 1953), broadcaster, novelist
- William Stafford (1914–1993), poet, pacifist

=== Music ===
- James Avery (1937–2009), conductor, pianist
- Jock Bartley, guitarist
- Steven Stucky (1949–2016), composer
- Murry Wilson (1917–1973), record producer, songwriter; father of three Beach Boys performers

=== Other visual arts ===
- Charles Stafford Duncan (1892–1952), artist
- John Newsom (born 1970), painter

== Business ==
- James Barnett (born 1986), entrepreneur, activist
- David Dillon (born 1951), former CEO of Kroger, great-grandson of J.S. Dillon who founded Dillons
- Hal Prewitt (born 1954), technology entrepreneur, inventor, race car driver, artist, photographer

== Crime ==
- Edward J. Adams (1887–1921), bank robber

== Military ==
- Robert S. Lucas (1930–2016), U.S. Coast Guard rear admiral
- Alexander Pearson Jr., U.S. Army first lieutenant
- Fay B. Prickett, U.S. Army major general

== Politics ==
=== National ===
- Leland Barrows (1906–1988), U.S. ambassador to Cameroon and Togo
- Wesley E. Brown (1907–2012), U.S. federal judge
- William R. Brown (1840–1916), U.S. representative from Kansas
- Ralph Easley (1856–1939), political activist
- Martha Keys (born 1930), U.S. representative from Kansas
- Richard T. Morrison (born 1967), U.S. tax court judge
- Scott W. Stucky (born 1948), U.S. appeals court judge
- Jasper N. Tincher (1878–1951), U.S. representative from Kansas
- Kevin Yoder (born 1976), U.S. representative from Kansas

=== State ===
- Terry Bruce (born 1975), Kansas legislator
- Jack M. Campbell (1916–1999), 21st governor of New Mexico
- John F. Hayes (1919–2010), Kansas legislator
- Walter A. Huxman (1887–1972), 27th governor of Kansas, U.S. federal judge
- Dick Kraus (1937–2019), Massachusetts legislator
- Jay La Suer (born 1940), California legislator
- B. Robert Lewis (1931–1979), Minnesota state legislator and veterinarian
- William Yoast Morgan (1866–1932), lieutenant governor of Kansas
- Michael O'Neal (born 1951), Kansas legislator

=== Local ===
- Robert L. Burns (1876–1955), attorney; business manager of The Hutchinson News; Hutchinson school board, city council and school board for Los Angeles, California

== Sports ==
=== American football ===
- Geneo Grissom (born 1992), defensive lineman
- Ben Heeney, linebacker
- Ken Huff (born 1953), offensive lineman
- Buck Pierce (born 1981), quarterback
- Pat Ryan (born 1955), quarterback
- Tommy Thompson (1916–1989), quarterback

=== Baseball ===
- Jack Banta (1925–2006), pitcher for the Brooklyn Dodgers of Major League Baseball
- Joyce Barnes (1925–2017), All-American Girls Professional Baseball League player
- Andy Dirks (born 1986), outfielder with the Detroit Tigers of Major League Baseball

=== Basketball ===
- Jamie Carey (born 1981), Former WNBA guard for the Connecticut Sun

=== Gymnastics ===
- Dallas Bixler (1910–1990), Olympic gold medal-winning gymnast

== Fictional residents ==
- Sam "Squid" Dullard, character on Rocket Power, moves to fictional California town featured in the show in the first episode, revealed in a later episode that he's from Hutchinson
- Jeff Tracy, from the British TV series Thunderbirds, as well as his five sons Scott, Virgil, John, Gordon and Alan, are all born in Hutchinson. It was mentioned before that they originated from Kansas, which was further specified to be Hutchinson in the book 'Thunderbirds: International Rescue Technical Operations Manual', released in 2026 by Anderson Entertainment.

== See also ==
- Lists of people from Kansas
