= Elizabeth Stanley =

Elizabeth Stanley may refer to:

- Elizabeth Stanley, Countess of Derby (1575–1627), English noblewoman
- Elizabeth Stanley (actress) (born 1978), American actress
- Elizabeth Stanley, Countess of Huntingdon (1588–1633), English noblewoman
- Bessie Anderson Stanley (1879–1952), American poet
