= Towne East Square =

Coordinates: 37.6832°N 97.2502°W

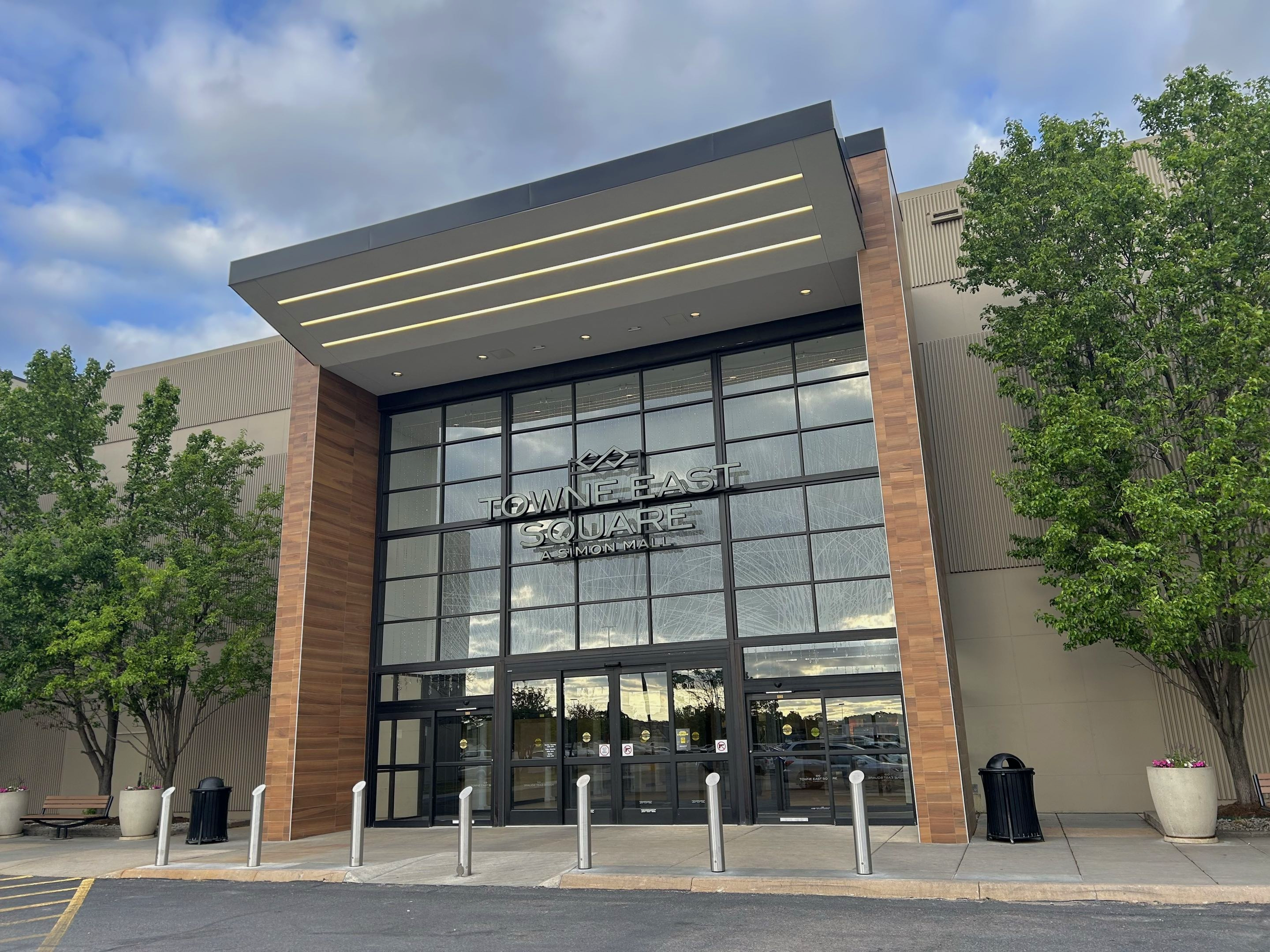
- Address: 7700 East Kellogg Drive; Wichita, Kansas; 67207
- Opened: August 14, 1975; 51 years ago
- Developer: Melvin Simon & Associates
- Manager: Simon Property Group
- Owner: Simon Property Group
- Num. of stores: 122
- Num. of anchor tenants: 5
- Floor area: 1,145,360 sq ft (106,407 m^{2})
- Floors: 2
- Parking: Parking lot
- Public transit: Wichita Transit
- Website: Official website

Towne East Square is an enclosed, two-story shopping mall located in the eastern section of Wichita, Kansas, United States.

== Overview ==
Towne East Square has 122 stores and restaurants in 1,145,360 square feet (106,407.4 m^{2}) of gross leasable area. The anchor stores are Dillard's, Round One Entertainment, JCPenney, Von Maur, and Scheels. In summer 2019, a Round One Entertainment complex started construction in the former J.M. McDonald/Service Merchandise/Stein Mart/Steve & Barry's/Mattress Hub Superstore/Wright Career College/Glow Golf space. It was later confirmed that the Round One Entertainment Complex was slated to open in 2020. It was intended to open on July 1, 2020, but due to the COVID-19 pandemic in Kansas, the store officially opened on July 18, 2020.

The area around the mall was changed heavily in recent years as several businesses and hotels were demolished for the expansion and addition of a flyover on Highways 54/400 (locally signed Kellogg). Simon has purchased much of the vacated land for redevelopment.

== History ==
The mall was first planned in 1972 as Kellogg Mall, but was later changed to Towne East Square. Construction began in 1973, and officially opened on August 14, 1975, and was the first large, modern, multi-level enclosed mall in Wichita. The original anchors were JCPenney, Dillard's, Henry's, Sears (which opened soon after the mall opened), and J.M. McDonald.

J.M. McDonald liquidated in 1983 as part of parent company Wickes filing for bankruptcy, and was replaced by Service Merchandise around 1985.

In 1992, Henry's closed and stayed abandoned for eight years until it was demolished in 2000 to make room for Von Maur. That store would open two years later on August 3, 2002. Meanwhile, Service Merchandise closed in 1998 due to low sales, and was taken up by Stein Mart in 1999.

Stein Mart had financial troubles and closed in 2002. The store was later bought by Steve & Barry's around the mid-2000s, and liquidated in late 2008, following Steve and Barry's bankruptcy. In late 2008, Towne East Square received a renovation to give it more of an upscale look, including escalator movements. During the summer of 2009, Mattress Hub expanded their store at the mall into the former Steve and Barry's space, and moved in mid-2010 for Wright Career College, which opened in 2011.

A BJ's Restaurants opened outside the mall on July 16, 2012. On September 17 of the same year, Longhorn Steakhouse would open in the surrounding area.

Wright Career College later went bankrupt on April 16, 2016; Glow Golf later replaced Wright Career College on April 29, 2017, after moving from Reflection Ridge Plaza on the west side of Wichita. In 2018, Sears announced they would be closing 80 stores, including this one, which would close in March 2019. Glow Golf Wichita then announced on Facebook that they would be closing. Round One Entertainment later took up the space on July 18, 2020, causing four other businesses at the mall to move elsewhere in order to accommodate the tenant expansion.

Meanwhile, on December 28, 2018, it was announced that Sears would be closing as part of a plan to close 80 stores nationwide. The store closed in March 2019.

Scheels was confirmed on July 14, 2021, to replace Sears. The store opened on July 1, 2023.

On December 14, 2021, it was announced that Towne East Square would get a major overhaul both inside and outside of the mall. This overhaul would include the entrances getting wood and glass details and new signage, outdoor seating areas would be added, and the parking lots and entryways would get new landscaping. The parking lot also would be repaved. In 2021 it was reported that the mall's second level would get updated flooring.

On March 18, 2022, at around 5:30 PM, a shooting happened inside the Towne East Square close to the ROUND1 establishment. There was one death of a 14-year-old child. Police captured two suspects, one aged 16 and the other 17. This all stemmed from an argument between the teenagers when eventually one of them pulled out a firearm and fired it five to six times.

On August 31, 2024, a little before 6:00 PM, a fight between some teenagers caused mass hysteria of a supposed shooting. There was no evidence of a shooting except for a witness saying they heard gunshots.

On August 8, 2025, at around 3:30 PM, a shooting at the Scheels anchor store caused the store to go on lockdown. Two people were severely injured following the shooting.
