= Kansas Christian College =

Kansas Christian College may refer to:

- Kansas Christian College (Lincoln), a school that closed in 1913
- Kansas Christian College (Overland Park), a school formerly known as Kansas City College and Bible School
