= Matt Mattox (American football) =

American football player and coach (born 1982)

Current position
- Title: Offensive line coach
- Team: North Texas
- Conference: American

Biographical details
- Born: February 9, 1982 (age 44); Topeka, Kansas, U.S.

Playing career
- 2000–2001: Butler (KS)
- 2002–2003: Houston
- Positions: Tight end, offensive tackle

Coaching career (HC unless noted)
- 2005: Houston (S&C)
- 2006: Houston (GA)
- 2007–2011: Butler (KS) (TE/OL)
- 2012: Coffeyville (OC)
- 2013: Eastern Illinois (OL)
- 2014: Bowling Green (co-OC/OL)
- 2015: Tulsa (co-OC/OL)
- 2016: Texas (OL/RGC)
- 2017–2018: South Florida (OL/RGC)
- 2019: McNeese State (OC/OL)
- 2020–2021: UTSA (OL/RGC)
- 2022: UTSA (co-OC/OL)
- 2023 (spring): Purdue (OL)
- 2023: Ronald Reagan HS (TX)
- 2024–2025: East Carolina (OL)
- 2026–present: North Texas (OL)

Head coaching record
- Overall: 11–1

Matt Mattox (born February 9, 1982) is an American college football coach. He is the offensive line coach for North Texas.

Before taking the job with the South Florida, Mattox was the co-offensive coordinator and offensive line coach at the University of Tulsa, Bowling Green State University, and the University of Texas.

In 2015, Mattox joined the staff at the University of Texas as the offensive line coach and run game coordinator.

On December 30, 2016, 247 Sports reported that Mattox had taken the offensive line coach and run game coordinator position at South Florida, the same position he held under new South Florida head coach Charlie Strong at Texas.

In 2018, Mattox became offensive coordinator/offensive line coach for McNeese State joining Gilbert, who was hired as head coach.

On December 11, 2019, Mattox joined the UTSA coaching staff as the run game coordinator and offensive line coach for the 2020 football season with new head coach Jeff Traylor.

== Personal life ==
Mattox was born in Topeka, Kansas, and graduated from Holton High School in Holton, Kansas in 2000. He attended and played football for Butler Community College for two years before transferring to the University of Houston where he finished out his eligibility and graduated in 2005. His wife Stacey also attended the University of Houston. They have been married since 2010 and have two children together.

== Head coaching record ==
Year	Team	Overall	Conference	Standing	Bowl/playoffs
Ronald Reagan Rattlers () (2023)
2023	Ronald Reagan	11–1	9–0	1st	
Ronald Reagan:		11–1	9–0		
Total:		11–1			
National championship Conference title Conference division title or championship game berth
