= Battle of the Spurs (Kansas) =

Battle took place in 1859

The so-called Battle of the Spurs took place about 7 miles (11 km) north of Holton, Kansas, near Netawaka, Kansas, on January 31, 1859. Abolitionist John Brown, together with J. H. Kagi and Aaron Dwight Stevens, was escorting a group of 11 escaped slaves from the slave state of Missouri to freedom in Iowa. At Straight Creek, they faced a posse of U.S. marshals and others, who hoped to earn the $3,000 (equivalent to $104,989 in 2024) reward posted for Brown's capture. Brown, who "inspired terror in his enemies", faced a posse of 45 while his party only consisted of 21, including women and children. Brown led his party straight ahead, and the posse turned and ran in panic. Not a shot was fired nor a rifle raised. "Free-Staters labeled the confrontation the 'Battle of the Spurs,' in mocking reference to the proslavery posse fleeing on horseback." There is a historical marker.

== See also ==
- Bleeding Kansas
