= Circleville, Kansas =

City in Jackson County, Kansas

- City
- Location within Jackson County and Kansas

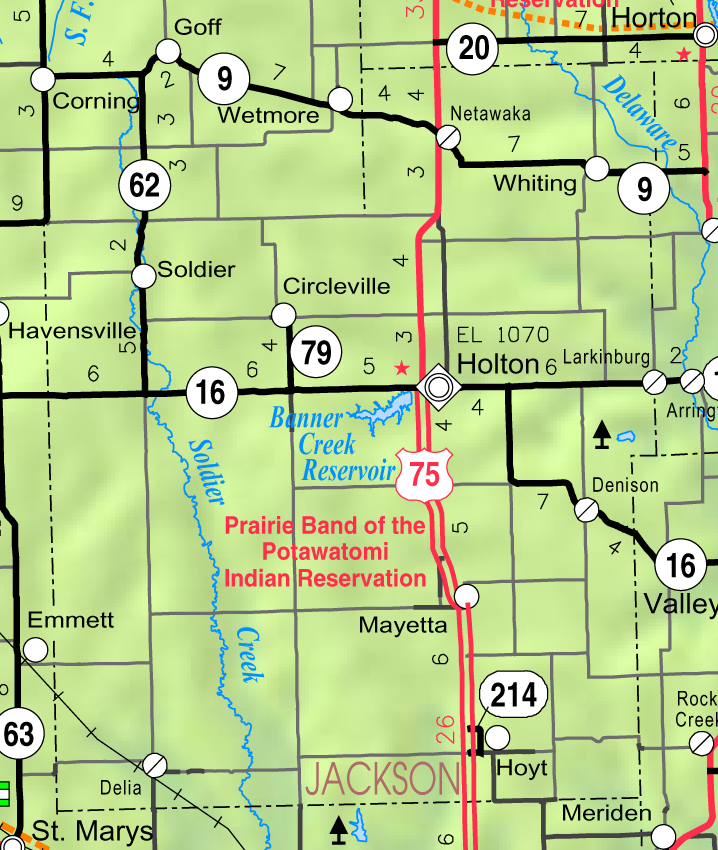
- KDOT map of Jackson County (legend)
- Coordinates: 39°30′34″N 95°51′20″W
- Country: United States
- State: Kansas
- County: Jackson
- Founded: 1863
- Named for: Circleville, Ohio

Area
  - Total: 0.25 sq mi (0.66 km^{2})
  - Land: 0.25 sq mi (0.66 km^{2})
  - Water: 0 sq mi (0.00 km^{2})
- Elevation: 1,148 ft (350 m)

Population (2020)
  - Total: 153
  - Density: 600/sq mi (230/km^{2})
- Time zone: UTC-6 (CST)
  - Summer (DST): UTC-5 (CDT)
- ZIP Code: 66416
- Area code: 785
- FIPS code: 20-13375
- GNIS ID: 2393528

Circleville is a city in Jackson County, Kansas, United States. As of the 2020 census, the population of the city was 153.

== History ==
Circleville was founded in 1863. It may have been named after Circleville, Ohio, or because the town "circled" around the prairie.

== Geography ==
According to the United States Census Bureau, the city has a total area of 0.26 square miles (0.67 km^{2}), all land.

=== Climate ===
This climatic region is typified by large seasonal temperature differences, with warm to hot (and often humid) summers and cold (sometimes severely cold) winters. According to the Köppen Climate Classification system, Circleville has a humid subtropical climate, abbreviated "Cfa" on climate maps.

== Demographics ==
Historical population
Census	Pop.	Note	%±
1880	122		—
1890	215		76.2%
1900	223		3.7%
1910	265		18.8%
1920	226		−14.7%
1930	211		−6.6%
1940	216		2.4%
1950	169		−21.8%
1960	151		−10.7%
1970	178		17.9%
1980	164		−7.9%
1990	153		−6.7%
2000	185		20.9%
2010	170		−8.1%
2020	153		−10.0%
U.S. Decennial Census

Circleville is part of the Topeka, Kansas Metropolitan Statistical Area.

=== 2020 census ===
The 2020 United States census counted 153 people, 63 households, and 39 families in Circleville. The population density was 604.7 per square mile (233.5/km^{2}). There were 76 housing units at an average density of 300.4 per square mile (116.0/km^{2}). The racial makeup was 88.24% (135) white or European American (87.58% non-Hispanic white), 0.0% (0) black or African-American, 1.31% (2) Native American or Alaska Native, 0.0% (0) Asian, 0.0% (0) Pacific Islander or Native Hawaiian, 0.65% (1) from other races, and 9.8% (15) from two or more races. Hispanic or Latino of any race was 0.65% (1) of the population.

Of the 63 households, 25.4% had children under the age of 18; 46.0% were married couples living together; 28.6% had a female householder with no spouse or partner present. 31.7% of households consisted of individuals and 22.2% had someone living alone who was 65 years of age or older. The average household size was 2.0 and the average family size was 2.4. The percent of those with a bachelor's degree or higher was estimated to be 7.8% of the population.

26.8% of the population was under the age of 18, 3.9% from 18 to 24, 19.0% from 25 to 44, 23.5% from 45 to 64, and 26.8% who were 65 years of age or older. The median age was 45.5 years. For every 100 females, there were 112.5 males. For every 100 females ages 18 and older, there were 115.4 males.

The 2016–2020 5-year American Community Survey estimates show that the median household income was $44,063 (with a margin of error of +/- $11,770) and the median family income was $53,125 (+/- $2,754). Males had a median income of $31,071 (+/- $2,575) versus $13,571 (+/- $2,752) for females. The median income for those above 16 years old was $20,625 (+/- $16,094). Approximately, 1.9% of families and 10.1% of the population were below the poverty line, including 6.3% of those under the age of 18 and 7.5% of those ages 65 or over.

=== 2010 census ===
As of the census of 2010, there were 170 people, 69 households, and 47 families residing in the city. The population density was 653.8 inhabitants per square mile (252.4/km^{2}). There were 77 housing units at an average density of 296.2 per square mile (114.4/km^{2}). The racial makeup of the city was 95.3% White, 0.6% African American, and 4.1% Native American. Hispanic or Latino of any race were 1.2% of the population.

There were 69 households, of which 34.8% had children under the age of 18 living with them, 52.2% were married couples living together, 11.6% had a female householder with no husband present, 4.3% had a male householder with no wife present, and 31.9% were non-families. 26.1% of all households were made up of individuals, and 11.6% had someone living alone who was 65 years of age or older. The average household size was 2.46 and the average family size was 2.83.

The median age in the city was 36.5 years. 28.2% of residents were under the age of 18; 8.2% were between the ages of 18 and 24; 20.6% were from 25 to 44; 26.5% were from 45 to 64; and 16.5% were 65 years of age or older. The gender makeup of the city was 53.5% male and 46.5% female.

=== 2000 census ===
As of the census of 2000, there were 185 people, 77 households, and 49 families residing in the city. The population density was 1,020.3 inhabitants per square mile (393.9/km^{2}). There were 80 housing units at an average density of 441.2 per square mile (170.3/km^{2}). The racial makeup of the city was 92.97% White, 2.70% Native American, 0.54% Asian, 0.54% from other races, and 3.24% from two or more races. Hispanic or Latino of any race were 2.70% of the population.

There were 77 households, out of which 40.3% had children under the age of 18 living with them, 51.9% were married couples living together, 7.8% had a female householder with no husband present, and 35.1% were non-families. 32.5% of all households were made up of individuals, and 10.4% had someone living alone who was 65 years of age or older. The average household size was 2.40 and the average family size was 3.00.

In the city, the population was spread out, with 30.3% under the age of 18, 7.6% from 18 to 24, 30.3% from 25 to 44, 19.5% from 45 to 64, and 12.4% who were 65 years of age or older. The median age was 31 years. For every 100 females, there were 110.2 males. For every 100 females age 18 and over, there were 87.0 males.

The median income for a household in the city was $32,885, and the median income for a family was $34,750. Males had a median income of $22,083 versus $20,000 for females. The per capita income for the city was $14,293. About 12.2% of families and 10.9% of the population were below the poverty line, including 15.7% of those under the age of eighteen and 16.0% of those 65 or over.

== Education ==
The community is served by Jackson Heights USD 335 public school district.
