= Robin Utterback =

Robin Utterback (born: Robert Franklin Utterback) (1949–2007) was a contemporary artist from Houston, Texas.

== Career ==
Born in the small town of Holton, Kansas, Utterback graduated from Rice University with a bachelor's degree in fine arts in 1971 and specialized in abstract painting. Utterback's works were displayed in other parts of the United States and the world. Houston museums that displayed his works include the Menil Collection and the Museum of Fine Arts Houston. Donahue/Sosinski Art in New York City showcased some of Utterback's works.

Often described as a "painter's painter", Utterback was a contemporary abstract artist and an integral part of the Houston art community for more than thirty years. Utterback's body of work varied from monochromatic planes emphasizing surface and light, to deconstructed, three-dimensional reliefs in which paint and plaster were layered directly upon the wooden substrate of the canvas. Drawing played a more dominant role in his later work, and he explored line and gesture by painting on unprimed canvas.

== Death ==
At around 6:30 P.M. on March 29, a fire erupted in a 2,880-square-foot (268 m^{2}) metal warehouse in the 2300 block of Grant Street near Fairview in the Neartown area of Houston. Utterback became unconscious and was extracted from the burning building. Fifty-seven-year-old Utterback died of his injuries on March 30 at the Memorial Hermann Hospital in the Texas Medical Center; his death was pronounced at 6:05 A.M.

On April 2, 2007, investigators found that 56-year-old Clifford David Gaylord, Utterback's roommate, fatally stabbed Utterback before setting the fire. Policemen found Gaylord seriously injured on March 30 at 100 Heights Boulevard after Gaylord attempted to commit suicide by being hit by a train. Gaylord, admitted to Ben Taub General Hospital, died of his injuries at 6:07 A.M.
