= Jackson Heights USD 335 =

Public school district in Holton, Kansas

Address
- 12692 266th Rd. Holton, Kansas, 66436; United States
- Coordinates: 39°31′33″N 95°44′25″W

District information
- Type: Public
- Grades: K to 12
- Schools: 2

Other information
- Website: jhcobras.net

Jackson Heights USD 335 is a rural unified school district headquartered about four miles north of Holton, Kansas, United States. The district includes the communities of Circleville, Netawaka, Soldier, Whiting, and nearby rural areas. The high school is notable for having previously been an Atlas nuclear missile site.

== History ==
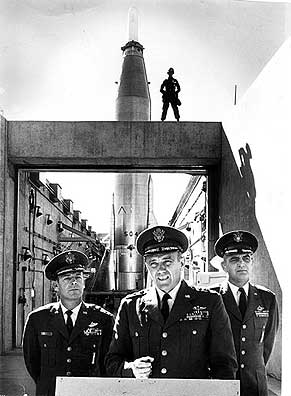
1961 Atlas missile site prior to becoming Jackson Heights High School

The site of the current high school previous housed a command center and one of the nine Atlas nuclear missiles assigned to Forbes Air Base from 1961 until its closure in 1964 and then sat empty for five years. A patron, Duane Wilson, then purchased the retired base from the federal government for the sum of $1.00 on behalf of the new Jackson Heights school district. With a few minor modifications, the command center became a high school and opened for classes in August 1969.

In 1975, the construction of a second building was completed to accommodate the district's elementary and middle school students.

With the passage of a $3 million bond issue on November 13, 2007, the construction of new classrooms and overall facilities improvements began at Jackson Heights High School. This was the first major renovation since the school's opening and relocates middle school classrooms into the high school building. After construction, the former underground classrooms became a storage area.

== Schools ==
The school district operates the following schools:

- Jackson Heights High School and Middle School
- Jackson Heights Elementary School

== See also ==
- Holton USD 336 - school district south of USD 335 in Holton
- List of unified school districts in Kansas
- List of high schools in Kansas
