= Lincoln Municipal Airport (Kansas) =

- IATA: none; ICAO: none; FAA LID: K71

Summary
- Airport type: Public
- Owner: City of Lincoln
- Serves: Lincoln, Kansas
- Elevation AMSL: 1,412 ft / 430 m
- Coordinates: 39°03′20″N 98°10′04″W

Map
- Location of airport in Kansas

Runways
Direction	Length		Surface
Direction	ft	m	Surface
2/20	2,700	823	Turf
15/33	2,700	823	Turf

Statistics (2010)
- Aircraft operations: 14,300
- Based aircraft: 6
- Source: Federal Aviation Administration

Lincoln Municipal Airport (FAA LID: K71) is a public use airport in Lincoln County, Kansas, United States. It is owned by the City of Lincoln, also known as Lincoln Center, and located two nautical miles (4 km) northwest of the central business district.

== Facilities and aircraft ==
Lincoln Municipal Airport covers an area of 80 acres (32 ha) at an elevation of 1,412 feet (430 m) above mean sea level. It has two runways with turf surfaces: 2/20 is 2,700 by 130 feet (823 x 40 m) and 15/33 is 2,700 by 370 feet (823 x 113 m).

For the 12-month period ending October 13, 2010, the airport had 14,300 aircraft operations, an average of 39 per day: 98% general aviation and 2% military. At that time there were six single-engine aircraft based at this airport.

== See also ==
- List of airports in Kansas
