= Frank C. Pomeroy =

American politician (1874–1949)

Frank C. Pomeroy (1874-1949) was a farmer and state legislator in Kansas. He served in the Kansas House of Representatives in 1905 and 1915, and then served in the Kansas Senate from 1917 to 1920. He returned to the House from 1935 to 1938. A Republican, he lived in Holton, Kansas. He lived in Holton, Kansas. He represented Jackson County, Kansas.
