= Holton High School =

- South Side of Holton High School

Location
- 901 New York Ave; Holton, Kansas 66436; United States

Information
- School type: Public, High School
- Established: 1880
- School district: Holton USD 336
- CEEB code: 171370
- Principal: Michael Kimberlin (Temporary)
- Teaching staff: 23.13 (FTE)(2024-2025)
- Grades: 9 to 12
- Gender: co-ed
- Enrollment: 284 (2026-2027)
- Student to teacher ratio: 14.48 (2024-2025)
- Colors: Blue; White
- Fight song: Wildcat Victory
- Athletics: KSHSAA Class 3A
- Athletics conference: Big East League
- Team name: Wildcats
- Newspaper: The Holtonian
- Yearbook: Retrospect
- Website: www.holtonks.net/page/holton-high-school

Holton High School is a public high school in Holton, Kansas operated by the Holton USD 336 school district, and serves grades 9 to 12. The school's mascot is a wildcat and the school's colors are blue and white. Michael Kimberlin is the school's current principal and about 284 students are enrolled in grades 9-12 as of the 2026-2027 school year.

== History ==
Holton High School had its first graduating class in 1881. The current Holton High School site was originally home to Campbell College from its opening in 1880, to its merger with Lane University in 1902, until 1913, when it was relocated to Kansas City and merged with Kansas City University. Following the merge, the campus became part of the Holton School District. The college's main building which was torn down, and replaced with a newly-constructed high school.

The high school was grouped as part of the Holton USD 336 public school district, c. 1965.

The school was renovated in 1994 where the gymnasium was temporarily divided up into classrooms. A new recessed gymnasium was later built, with the original school gym converted to a library. Other renovations included a video lab which produced programs for their public access channel.

In 2015, Holton held its 135th commencement exercises where they graduated 80 seniors.

== Notable alumni ==
- Lynn Jenkins (graduated 1981) - U.S. Representative
- Matt Mattox (graduated 2000) - football coach
- Pat Roberts (graduated 1954) - U.S. Senator

== See also ==
- List of high schools in Kansas
- List of unified school districts in Kansas

== School website ==
- Official website
