= Holton USD 336 =

Public school district in Holton, Kansas

Address
- 515 Pennsylvania Avenue Holton, Kansas, 66435; United States
- Coordinates: 39.46554°N 95.73507°W

District information
- Type: Public
- Grades: PreK to 12
- Schools: 3

Other information
- Website: holtonks.net

Holton USD 336 is a public unified school district headquartered in Holton, Kansas, United States. The district includes the communities of Holton, Denison, and nearby rural areas.

== Schools ==
The school district operates the following schools:

- Holton High School
- Holton Middle School
- Holton Elementary School
- Fresh Start

== Former schools ==
Schools previously operated:

- Colorado Elementary School – students were transferred to Holton Elementary in August 2016
- Central Elementary School – students were transferred to Holton Elementary in August 2016

== See also ==
- Jackson Heights USD 335 – school district north of USD 336
- Kansas State Department of Education
- Kansas State High School Activities Association
- List of high schools in Kansas
- List of unified school districts in Kansas
