= Jim Lane's Fort =

Fort in Kansas, US

Coordinates: 39.4646°N 95.7309°W

Jim Lane's Fort or Fort Jim Lane
- Holton, Kansas

Site information
- Type: free-stater post during Bleeding Kansas era
- Controlled by: free-staters

Site history
- Built: August 1856
- In use: August 1856; possibly used from December 1856 through spring 1865
- Materials: wood

Garrison information
- Garrison: free-state residents

Jim Lane's Fort, sometimes called Fort Jim Lane, was built in August 1856, in Holton, Kansas, United States. It was named to honor free-state leader James H. Lane, who helped organize the settlement of several towns in northeast Kansas Territory, including Holton. Holton was settled by about fifty free-state settlers at the time the fort was built. The fort, built to serve as a place of refuge for the townspeople, was built of logs. It measured 20 feet (6.1 m) by 30 feet (9.1 m).

The settlers of Holton soon heard that a militia partial to the southern element in Kansas was headed their way, so they moved south to Topeka, Kansas, for the winter. Some of the settlers who left returned in December 1856. It is not known to what extent Jim Lane's Fort was used after this point. It possibly stood until 1872, when Central School was built on the site. A bronze marker was placed on the site in 1970, to explain its significance.
