= Bernice T. Van der Vries =

American politician

Bernice Taber Van der Vries (February 14, 1890 – August 30, 1986) was an American politician.

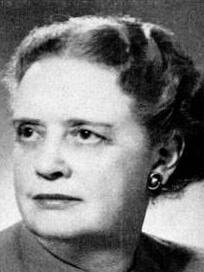
Official portrait, circa 1947

Born in Holton, Kansas, Van der Vries went to Barnard College and the University of Kansas. She lived in Winnetka, Illinois and had served on the Winnetka Village Board in 1931 and 1933. From 1935 to 1957, Van der Vries served in the Illinois House of Representatives and was a Republican. Then, Van der Vries served on the Chicago Transit Authority Board from 1957 to 1971. Van der Vries died at the Swedish Retirement Association Home in Evanston, Illinois.
