= Jessa Crispin =

American literary critic, editor of Bookslut

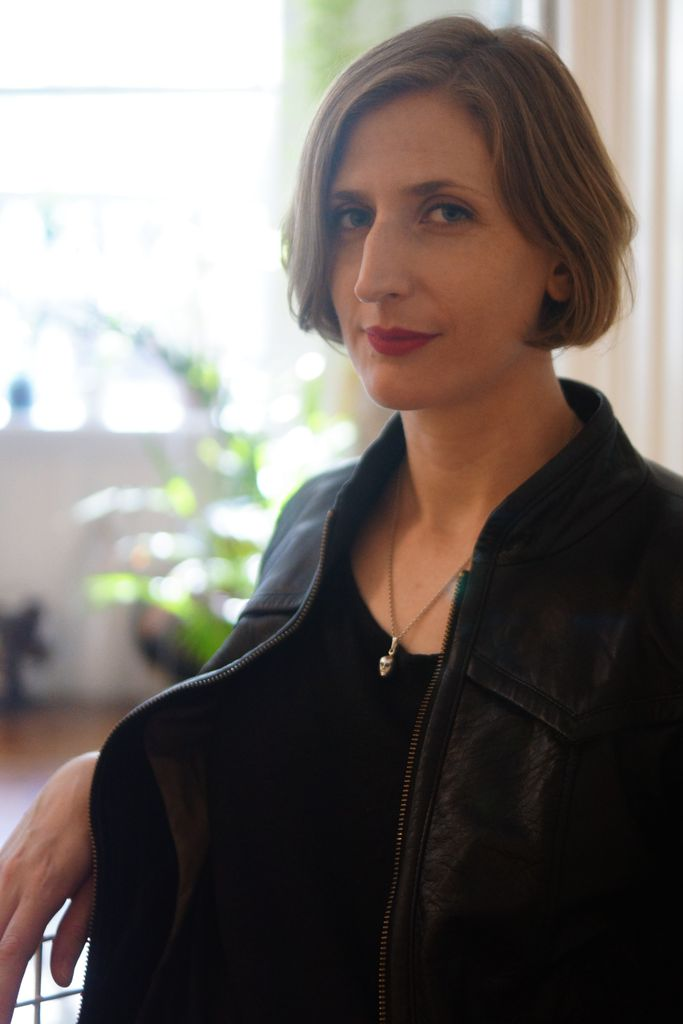
- Born: 1978 (age 47–48); Lincoln, Kansas, U.S.
- Occupations: Blogger, editor, writer
- Website: jessacrispin.com

Jessa Crispin (born c. 1978 in Lincoln, Kansas) is an American critic, author, feminist, and the editor-in-chief of Bookslut, a litblog and webzine founded in 2002. She has published five books, most recently What is Wrong with Men: Patriarchy, the Crisis of Masculinity, and How (of Course) Michael Douglas Films Explain Everything (2025).

== Early life ==
Crispin is from Lincoln, Kansas; she has described both her hometown and upbringing in her family as very conservative. She attended Baker University in Kansas for two years before leaving without a degree.

== Literary career ==
Crispin began her literary career as publishing outsider who started her blog Bookslut on the side while working at Planned Parenthood in Austin, Texas. She eventually came to support herself by writing and editing the site full-time. Bookslut ran for 14 years, with the last issue announced in May 2016. Bookslut received mentions in many national and international newspapers, including The New York Times Book Review and The Washington Post.

In 2005, Crispin kept a diary about her work on books for The Guardian. Crispin had a regular column in the online cultural journal The Smart Set, published by Drexel University. She was a book critic for NPR and contributor to PBS's Need to Know. She has written for the New York Times, the Washington Post, Chicago Sun-Times and The Globe and Mail, among other publications. She wrote the afterword to Melville House Books' reissue of Heinrich Böll's Billiards at Half-Past Nine.

== Personal life ==
In 2018, Crispin married with boyfriend Nicolás Rodríguez Melo, partly in order to sponsor his visa, and interviewed him for her Public Intellectual podcast about the performance of masculinity and femininity. She has criticized married women in the past: "Marriage’s history is about treating women as property, and by being married you’re legitimising that history."

== Works ==
- The Dead Ladies Project: Exiles, Expats, and Ex-Countries (Chicago: The University of Chicago Press, 2015, ISBN 9780226278452)
- The Creative Tarot: A Modern Guide to an Inspired Life (New York: Simon and Schuster, 2016, ISBN 9781501120237)
- Why I Am Not a Feminist: A Feminist Manifesto (New York: Melville House, 2017, ISBN 9781612196015)
- My Three Dads: Patriarchy on the Great Plains (University of Chicago Press, 2022, ISBN 9780226820101)
- What is Wrong with Men: Patriarchy, the Crisis of Masculinity, and How (of Course) Michael Douglas Films Explain Everything (Pantheon, 2025, ISBN 9780593317624)
