= Kansas State University Salina Aerospace and Technology Campus =

Public university in Salina, Kansas, US

Coordinates: 38°48′01″N 97°38′14″W

Kansas State University Salina Campus
- Former names: Kansas State University Salina, Kansas State University Polytechnic Campus, Kansas Technical Institute
- Established: 1965; 61 years ago
- Parent institution: Kansas State University
- Location: Salina, Kansas
- CEO and Dean: Alysia Starkey
- Colors: Royal purple
- Website: salina.k-state.edu

Kansas State University Salina Aerospace and Technology Campus, also known as K-State Salina, is a branch campus of Kansas State University, and the home of the University's College of Technology and Aviation. It is located in Salina, Kansas, United States.

== History ==
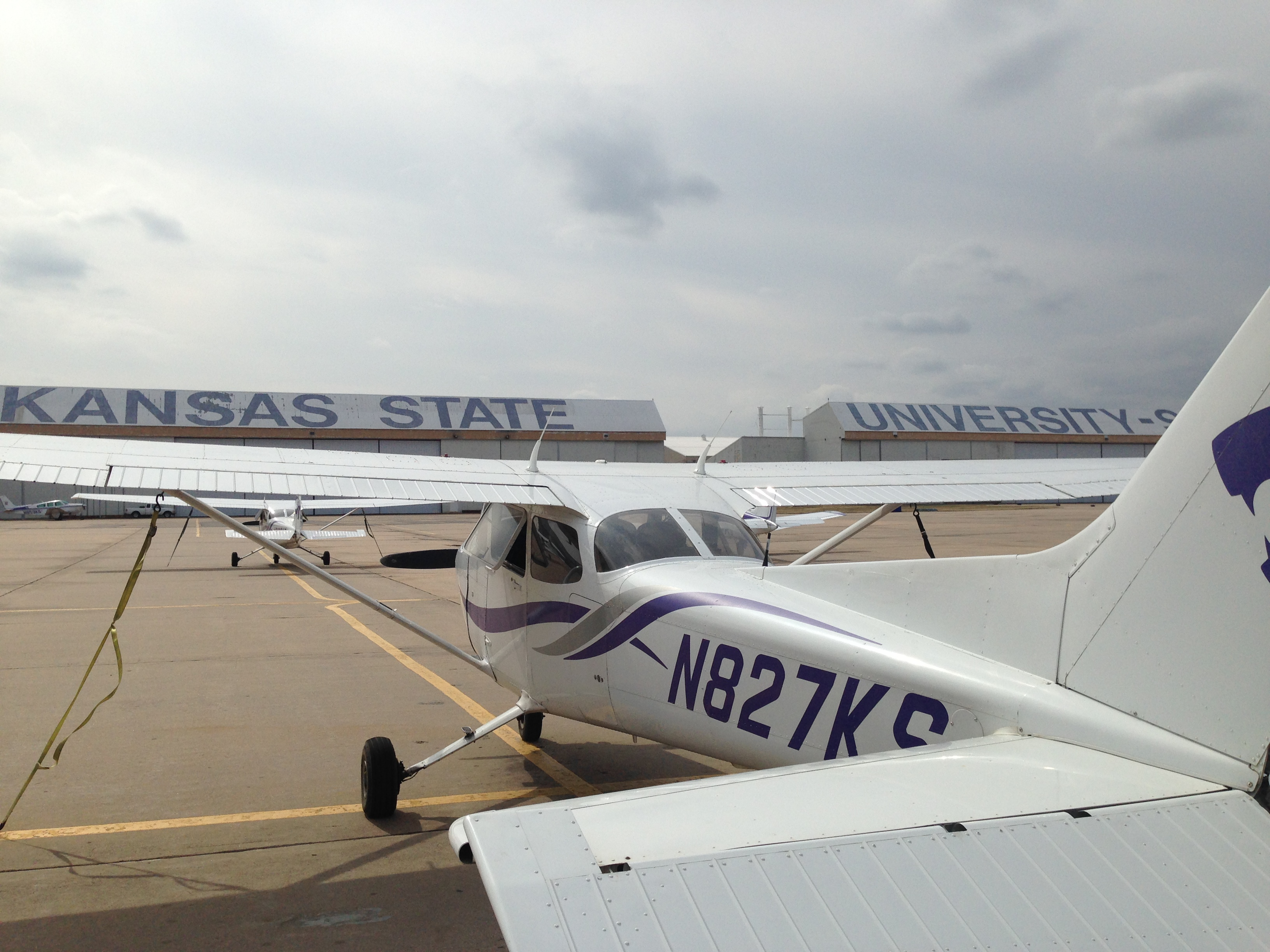
Kansas State aircraft and hangars

Kansas State University Salina Aerospace and Technology Campus and the College of Technology and Aviation were established in 1991 as a result of the merger of the Kansas Technical Institute with Kansas State University. It offers degree programs in the fields of engineering technology and aviation, consisting of associate and bachelor's degrees as well as a Professional Master of Technology program. Approximately 1,000 students are enrolled at the Salina campus. About 85 percent of the student body comes from Kansas and 80 percent attends on a full-time basis. Students are not required to live on campus but do have the option of living in one of two suite-style residence halls. Classes are small; first-year English and speech courses are limited to 25 students. Engineering technology and aviation maintenance students begin hands-on classes their first semester and pilot students begin flying as early as the first week of school. Campus facilities include laboratories for student projects and three runways adjacent to campus.

After merging with Kansas State University, the campus was originally called Kansas State University - Salina Campus. On October 14, 2015, the Kansas Board of Regents approved changing the campus's name to Kansas State University Polytechnic Campus. On August 26, 2021, the university announced that the campus would again be renamed, to Kansas State University Salina Aerospace and Technology Campus.

== Overview ==
The college's technology management degree allows students from all 19 community colleges in Kansas to transfer their credit hours from an associate degree as a core area of study and build on that knowledge with classes in management and business to complete a bachelor's degree. Other degree programs offered on the K-State Salina campus include family studies and human services - both a general option and a personal financial planning option, as well as social work and a professional master of technology.

=== Fleet ===
The school offers the following fleet of aircraft:

- (12) C-172R
- (5) C-172R (G-1000)
- (1) C-172N
- (10) C-172S (G-1000)
- (1) C-150
- (1) 8KCAB Super Decathlon
- (3) BE-58 Beechcraft Baron
