= Kansas Technical Institute =

Coordinates: 38°47′37″N 97°38′13″W

The Kansas Technical Institute was a two-year technical college located in Salina, Kansas and the predecessor of Kansas State Polytechnic.

== History ==
The school was created in 1965 by the Kansas Legislature and originally was named "Schilling Institute" because the campus was located on part of the former Schilling Air Force Base. Programs at the technical school focused on engineering technology and aviation technology.

The college was governed by the State Board of Education until July 1, 1976, when it was placed under the Control of the Kansas Board of Regents. The college became the seventh college under control of the Board of Regents. The name was changed in 1988 to "Kansas College of Technology." The two-year College became a campus of Kansas State University in 1991 and was renamed Kansas State University-Salina, College of Aviation and Technology, reflecting the two main fields of academia on campus. In 2015, the campus was again renamed to Kansas State University Polytechnic Campus. The former associate degree granting programs at Kansas Technical Institute (Kansas College of Technology) were Aeronautical Technology, Chemical Engineering Technology, Civil Engineering Technology, Computer Science Technology, Electronics Technology and Mechanical Engineering Technology. All existing programs at the time of the merger were continued, intact, and after the merger Baccalaureate Degrees were developed in the Engineering Technologies. Also, the programs of Technology were streamlined into two major divisions, namely Technology and Aviation. Each division offers multiple specialties which were available in the departments before the merger.

== See also ==
- Kansas State University
- Kansas State University Polytechnic Campus
