= College of the Sisters of Bethany =

Defunct school in Topeka, Kansas, US

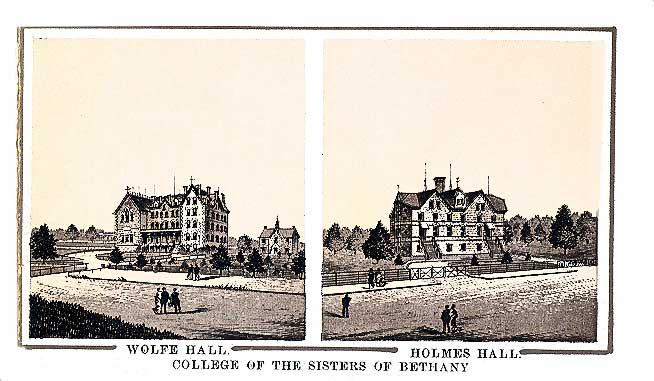
- Originally named Episcopal Female Seminary of Topeka
- Type: Private
- Active: February 2, 1861–1928
- Religious affiliation: Episcopal Diocese of Kansas
- Location: Topeka, Kansas, U.S.

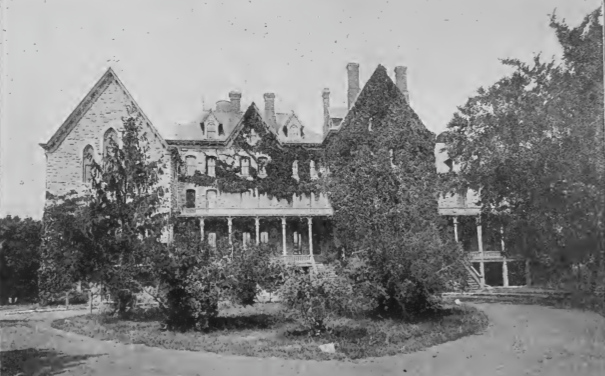
The College of the Sisters of Bethany

The College of the Sisters of Bethany is a defunct school located in Topeka, Kansas, United States. The school was chartered by the Kansas Territory on February 2, 1861 (although Kansas was officially admitted to the Union four days earlier), and was originally named Episcopal Female Seminary of Topeka but changed its name on July 9, 1872. Classes began with 35 students and 2 teachers on June 11, 1861. The school operated under the Episcopal Diocese of Kansas church until it closed in 1928.

The "territorial charter" was approved by the legislature on January 29, 1861—the same day that President Buchanan signed the Act of Congress admitting Kansas into the Union as a state. However, Territorial governor Samuel Medary returned the bill with objections. The legislature considered his objections and passed the bill with enough of a majority to overcome the governor's objections on February 2. This was the last legislative act of the Kansas Territorial government.
