= Lincoln Center, Kansas =

City in Lincoln County, Kansas

Lincoln, Kansas
- City and County seat
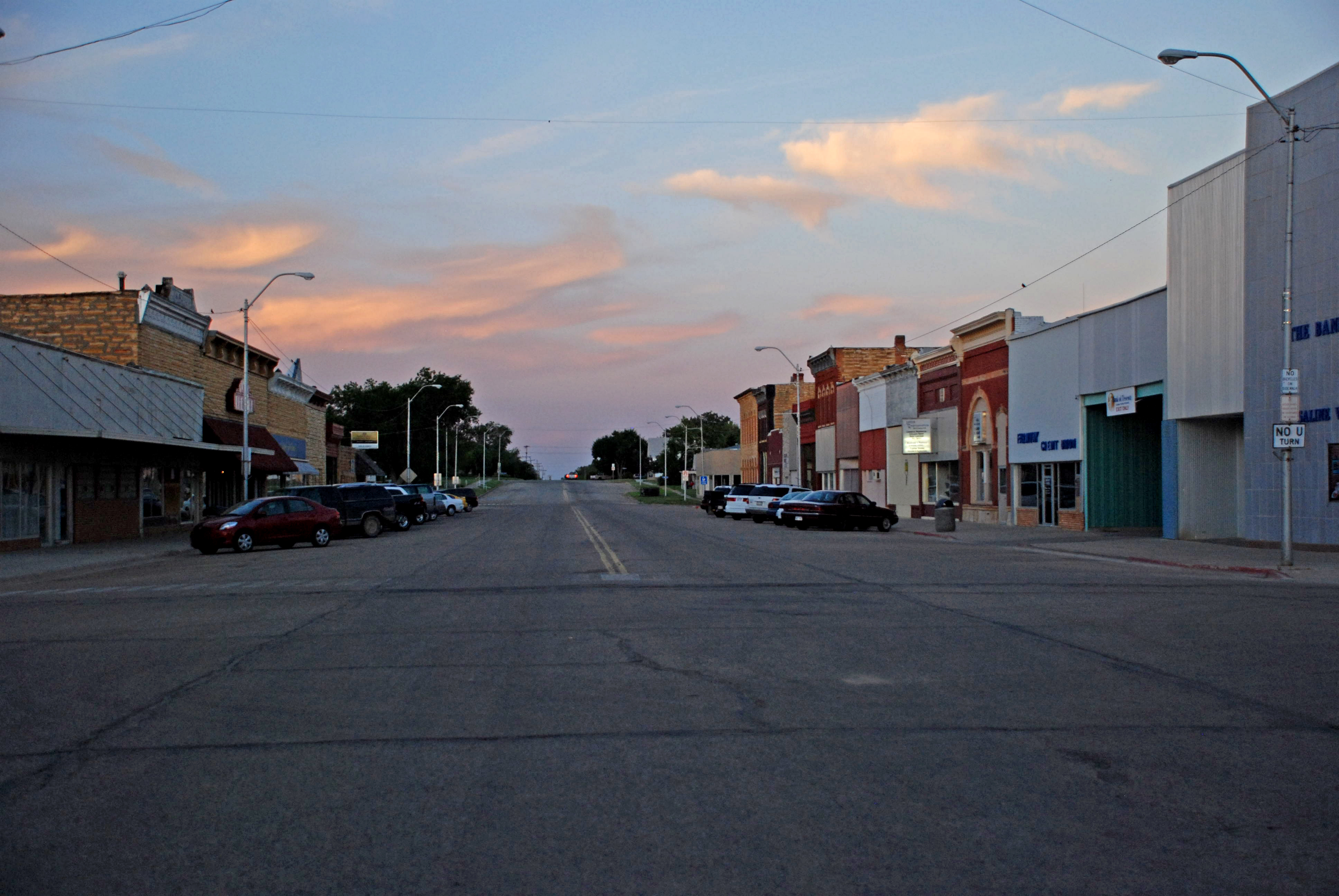
- Lincoln business district (2010)

- Location within Lincoln County and Kansas

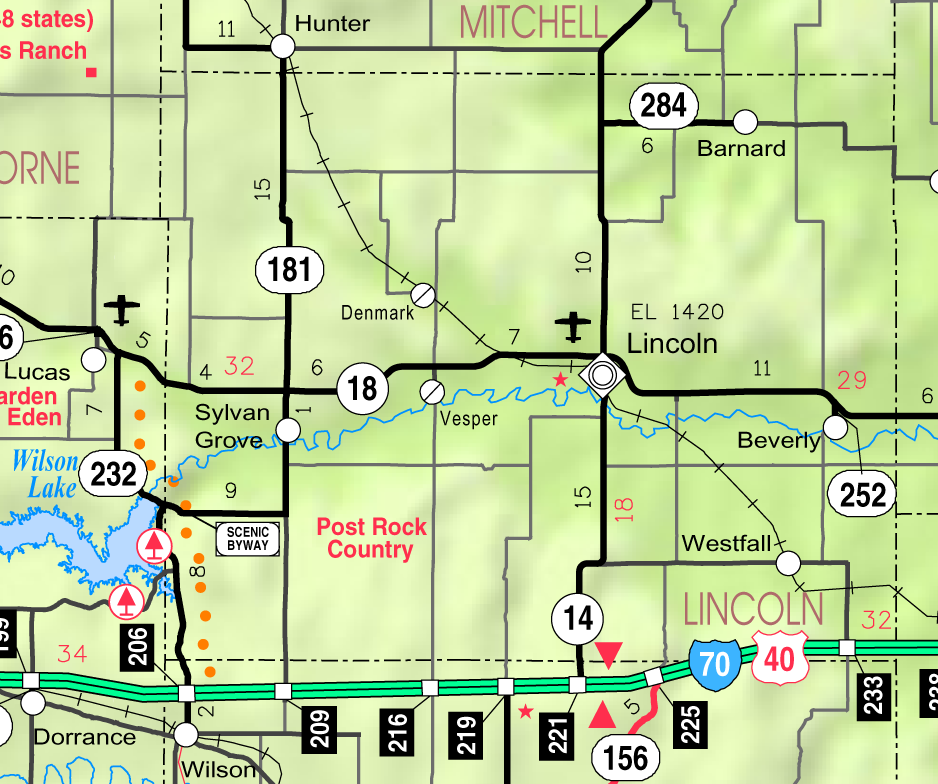
- KDOT map of Lincoln County (legend)
- Coordinates: 39°2′27″N 98°8′41″W
- Country: United States
- State: Kansas
- County: Lincoln
- Founded: 1870
- Incorporated: 1879
- Named for: Abraham Lincoln

Government
  - Type: Mayor–council
  - Mayor: Travis Schwerdtfager

Area
  - Total: 1.25 sq mi (3.24 km^{2})
  - Land: 1.25 sq mi (3.24 km^{2})
  - Water: 0 sq mi (0.00 km^{2})
- Elevation: 1,417 ft (432 m)

Population (2020)
  - Total: 1,171
  - Density: 936/sq mi (361/km^{2})
- Time zone: UTC-6 (CST)
  - Summer (DST): UTC-5 (CDT)
- ZIP Code: 67455
- Area code: 785
- FIPS code: 20-40800
- GNIS ID: 472553
- Website: lincolnks.org

Lincoln Center, more commonly known as Lincoln, is a city in and the county seat of Lincoln County, Kansas, United States. As of the 2020 census, the population of the city was 1,171.

== History ==
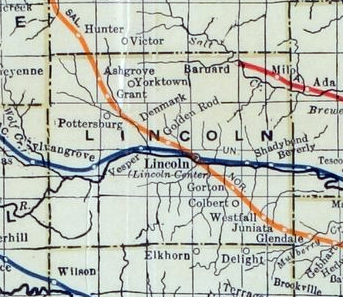
1915 railroad map of Lincoln County

Settler George Green founded the town of Lincoln in 1870, naming it after the county. "Center" was added to its name to indicate its location in the central part of the county. County residents initially voted to place the county seat in Lincoln Center. Elections in November 1870 resulted in the seat relocating to nearby Abram, sparking a county seat war. Another vote in February 1872 reversed the switch, and Lincoln Center again became the county seat. Residents relocated all the buildings in Abram to Lincoln, merging the two communities. The town was incorporated as the city of Lincoln Center in 1879, and is officially referred to as such in the United States Census. Both the city government and local chamber of commerce refer to the city as Lincoln, and it appears as such on state maps and signs.

Lincoln grew rapidly over the following decade, more than doubling in size, and the city gradually modernized. Kansas Christian College opened in Lincoln in 1885. The Union Pacific Railroad opened a branch line through the city in 1886, bringing mail service. In 1900, after the previous courthouse burned down, a new one was built out of native limestone known locally as post rock. Rural mail delivery began in 1904, and telephony service began in 1905. In 1906, the city's first power plant opened, providing electric power. Beginning in the 1920s, the mechanization of agriculture reduced the need for farm work and commercial farming operations gradually consolidated family farms, resulting in a reduction in the population. By 1950, the state highway commission had completed K-14 and K-18 through Lincoln.

In 1989, given the widespread, long-standing use of post rock limestone in local building construction, the Kansas Legislature named Lincoln County as "The Post Rock Capital of Kansas".

In the past, Lincoln has offered free residential lots to entice people to move to Lincoln. This program was suspended in 2024.

== Geography ==
The city lies on the north side of the Saline River in the Smoky Hills region of the Great Plains. Yauger Creek, a tributary of the Saline River, flows south along the eastern edge of the city to its confluence with the Saline immediately south of the city. The confluence of the Saline and Lost Creek, another of the river's tributaries, is located immediately southwest of the city. Located at the intersection of Kansas Highway 14 (K-14) and Kansas Highway 18 (K-18) in north-central Kansas, Lincoln is 101 miles (163 km) northwest of Wichita, 190 miles (310 km) west of Kansas City, and 371 miles (597 km) east-southeast of Denver.

According to the United States Census Bureau, the city has a total area of 1.24 square miles (3.21 km^{2}), all land.

=== Climate ===
Lying in the southern periphery of North America's humid continental climate (Köppen Dfa), Lincoln experiences hot, humid summers and cold, dry winters. The hottest temperature recorded in Lincoln was 119 °F (48.3 °C) on July 13, 1934, while the coldest temperature recorded was −27 °F (−32.8 °C) on December 23, 1989.

Climate data for Lincoln, Kansas, 1991–2020 normals, extremes 1912–present
Month	Jan	Feb	Mar	Apr	May	Jun	Jul	Aug	Sep	Oct	Nov	Dec	Year
Record high °F (°C)	81 (27)	87 (31)	95 (35)	104 (40)	108 (42)	115 (46)	119 (48)	118 (48)	117 (47)	103 (39)	88 (31)	81 (27)	119 (48)
Mean maximum °F (°C)	66.0 (18.9)	71.9 (22.2)	81.8 (27.7)	88.2 (31.2)	93.7 (34.3)	101.0 (38.3)	105.4 (40.8)	103.7 (39.8)	98.9 (37.2)	91.6 (33.1)	77.4 (25.2)	66.0 (18.9)	107.0 (41.7)
Mean daily maximum °F (°C)	40.7 (4.8)	45.3 (7.4)	56.4 (13.6)	66.0 (18.9)	75.7 (24.3)	87.3 (30.7)	92.7 (33.7)	90.1 (32.3)	82.2 (27.9)	69.6 (20.9)	55.0 (12.8)	42.8 (6.0)	67.0 (19.4)
Daily mean °F (°C)	28.3 (−2.1)	32.0 (0.0)	42.3 (5.7)	51.9 (11.1)	62.8 (17.1)	74.3 (23.5)	79.5 (26.4)	76.9 (24.9)	68.4 (20.2)	55.2 (12.9)	41.5 (5.3)	30.8 (−0.7)	53.7 (12.0)
Mean daily minimum °F (°C)	16.0 (−8.9)	18.7 (−7.4)	28.2 (−2.1)	37.8 (3.2)	49.8 (9.9)	61.4 (16.3)	66.3 (19.1)	63.7 (17.6)	54.7 (12.6)	40.9 (4.9)	27.9 (−2.3)	18.9 (−7.3)	40.4 (4.6)
Mean minimum °F (°C)	−1.8 (−18.8)	1.6 (−16.9)	10.4 (−12.0)	22.2 (−5.4)	34.5 (1.4)	48.2 (9.0)	55.3 (12.9)	53.8 (12.1)	38.6 (3.7)	24.0 (−4.4)	11.3 (−11.5)	2.4 (−16.4)	−5.9 (−21.1)
Record low °F (°C)	−26 (−32)	−24 (−31)	−19 (−28)	3 (−16)	25 (−4)	35 (2)	44 (7)	40 (4)	26 (−3)	6 (−14)	−8 (−22)	−27 (−33)	−27 (−33)
Average precipitation inches (mm)	0.71 (18)	1.03 (26)	1.62 (41)	2.60 (66)	4.62 (117)	3.97 (101)	4.02 (102)	3.87 (98)	2.42 (61)	1.92 (49)	1.17 (30)	1.11 (28)	29.06 (737)
Average snowfall inches (cm)	4.3 (11)	3.9 (9.9)	1.5 (3.8)	0.9 (2.3)	0.0 (0.0)	0.0 (0.0)	0.0 (0.0)	0.0 (0.0)	0.0 (0.0)	0.2 (0.51)	1.6 (4.1)	2.9 (7.4)	15.3 (39.01)
Average precipitation days (≥ 0.01 in)	3.9	4.6	6.1	7.8	10.4	9.1	8.6	8.2	6.7	5.8	4.7	4.2	80.1
Average snowy days (≥ 0.1 in)	2.2	2.0	1.0	0.4	0.0	0.0	0.0	0.0	0.0	0.2	0.7	1.9	8.4
Source 1: NOAA
Source 2: National Weather Service

== Demographics ==
Historical population
Census	Pop.	Note	%±
1880	422		—
1890	1,100		160.7%
1900	1,262		14.7%
1910	1,508		19.5%
1920	1,613		7.0%
1930	1,732		7.4%
1940	1,761		1.7%
1950	1,636		−7.1%
1960	1,717		5.0%
1970	1,582		−7.9%
1980	1,599		1.1%
1990	1,381		−13.6%
2000	1,349		−2.3%
2010	1,297		−3.9%
2020	1,171		−9.7%
U.S. Decennial Census

=== 2020 census ===
The 2020 United States census counted 1,171 people, 522 households, and 296 families in Lincoln Center. The population density was 935.3 per square mile (361.1/km^{2}). There were 671 housing units at an average density of 535.9 per square mile (206.9/km^{2}). The racial makeup was 89.75% (1,051) white or European American (86.68% non-Hispanic white), 0.51% (6) black or African-American, 0.26% (3) Native American or Alaska Native, 0.68% (8) Asian, 0.0% (0) Pacific Islander or Native Hawaiian, 3.67% (43) from other races, and 5.12% (60) from two or more races. Hispanic or Latino of any race was 8.45% (99) of the population.

Of the 522 households, 24.3% had children under the age of 18; 41.0% were married couples living together; 31.4% had a female householder with no spouse or partner present. 37.4% of households consisted of individuals and 19.7% had someone living alone who was 65 years of age or older. The average household size was 2.2 and the average family size was 3.1. The percent of those with a bachelor's degree or higher was estimated to be 13.3% of the population.

23.5% of the population was under the age of 18, 6.4% from 18 to 24, 20.1% from 25 to 44, 23.1% from 45 to 64, and 27.0% who were 65 years of age or older. The median age was 45.0 years. For every 100 females, there were 108.4 males. For every 100 females ages 18 and older, there were 116.9 males.

The 2016–2020 5-year American Community Survey estimates show that the median household income was $42,857 (with a margin of error of +/- $6,193) and the median family income was $65,114 (+/- $10,517). Males had a median income of $36,250 (+/- $6,718) versus $21,827 (+/- $10,882) for females. The median income for those above 16 years old was $30,859 (+/- $3,636). Approximately, 1.4% of families and 9.0% of the population were below the poverty line, including 2.0% of those under the age of 18 and 6.9% of those ages 65 or over.

=== 2010 census ===
As of the 2010 United States census, there were 1,297 people, 576 households, and 324 families residing in the city. The population density was 1,049.4 inhabitants per square mile (405.2/km^{2}). There were 734 housing units at an average density of 593.9 per square mile (229.3/km^{2}). The racial makeup of the city was 96.6% White, 1.1% American Indian, 0.3% African American, 0.1% Asian, 0.8% from some other race, and 1.2% from two or more races. Hispanics and Latinos of any race were 2.8% of the population.

There were 576 households, of which 24.1% had children under the age of 18 living with them, 43.2% were married couples living together, 9.5% had a female householder with no husband present, 3.5% had a male householder with no wife present, and 43.8% were non-families. 40.6% of all households were made up of individuals, and 20.1% had someone living alone who was 65 years of age or older. The average household size was 2.16, and the average family size was 2.95.

The median age in the city was 44.9 years. 25.1% of residents were under the age of 18; 5.6% were between the ages of 18 and 24; 19.4% were from 25 to 44; 25.1% were from 45 to 64; and 24.7% were 65 years of age or older. The gender makeup of the city was 46.6% male and 53.4% female.

The median income for a household in the city was $37,308, and the median income for a family was $47,679. Males had a median income of $33,650 versus $28,438 for females. The per capita income for the city was $19,949. About 13.0% of families and 15.1% of the population were below the poverty line, including 19.6% of those under age 18 and 5.7% of those age 65 or over.

== Government ==
Lincoln is a city of the second class with a mayor-council form of government. The city council consists of five members, and it meets on the second Monday of each month.

As the county seat, Lincoln is the administrative center of Lincoln County. The county courthouse is located downtown, and all departments of the county government base their operations in the city.

Lincoln lies within Kansas's 1st U.S. Congressional District. For the purposes of representation in the Kansas Legislature, the city is located in the 35th district of the Kansas Senate and the 107th district of the Kansas House of Representatives.

== Education ==
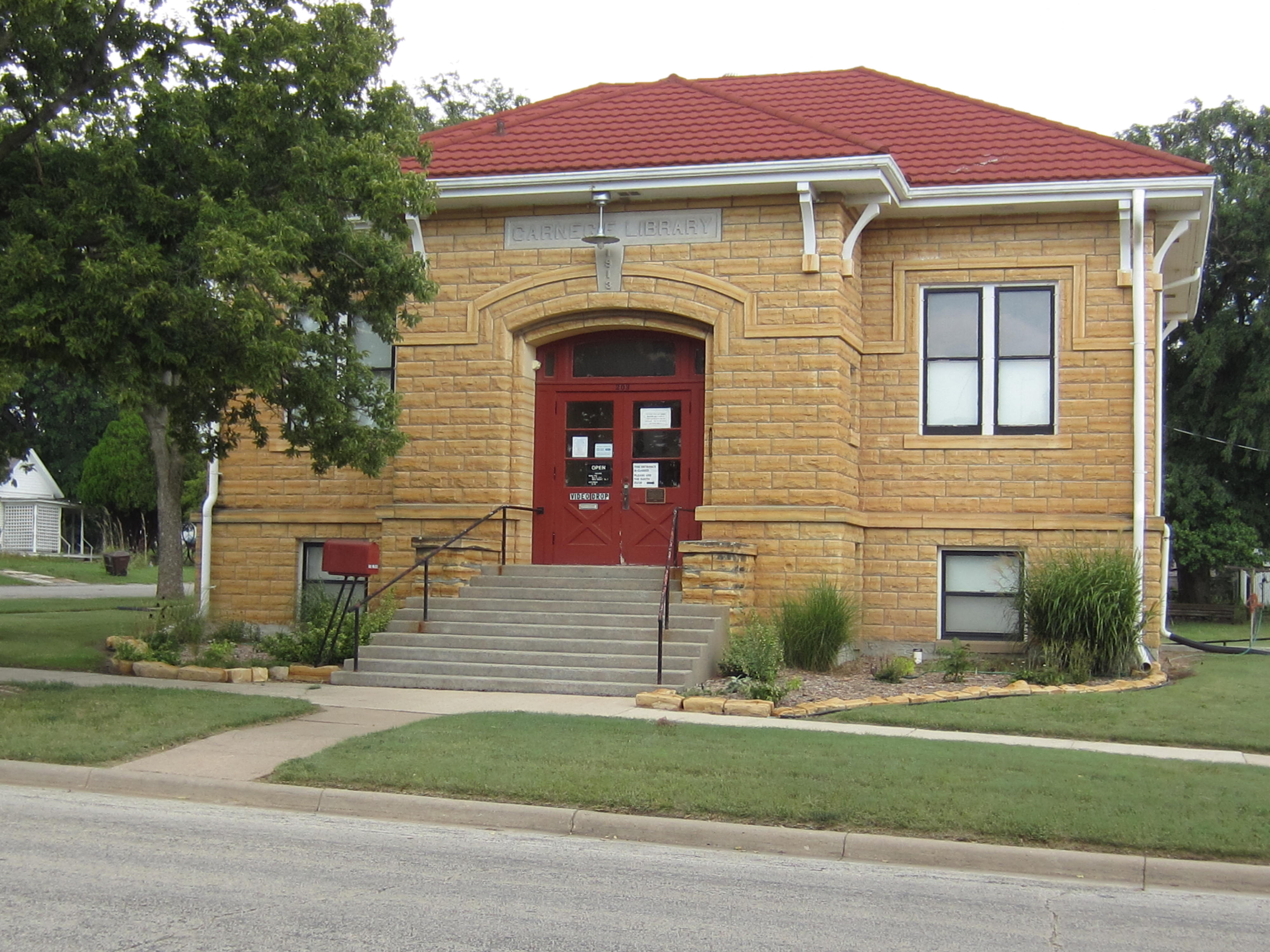
Lincoln Carnegie Library (2013)

=== Primary and secondary education ===
The community is served by Lincoln USD 298 public school district, which operates two public schools in Lincoln: Lincoln Elementary School (Grades Pre-K-5) and Lincoln Junior/Senior High School (6-12).

== Infrastructure ==
=== Transportation ===
Lincoln sits immediately south of the intersection of Kansas state highways K-14, which runs north-south through the city, and K-18, which wraps around the northern and eastern edges of the city.

Lincoln Municipal Airport, a general aviation facility, is located roughly a mile northwest of the city on K-18.

A line of the Kansas & Oklahoma Railroad runs through the west side of the city.

== Media ==
Lincoln has one weekly newspaper, The Lincoln Sentinel-Republican.

== In popular culture ==
In Season 5, Episode 1 of "In With the Old", the episode titled "Big Green Monster" featured a couple who were granted a free home. During the episode, the couple relocated their 1910 Dutch Colonial to their farm and began renovations.

== Notable people ==
Notable individuals who were born in and/or have lived in Lincoln include:

- William Baker (1831-1910), U.S. Representative from Kansas
- Jessa Crispin (1978- ), book critic
- Don Wendell Holter (1905-1999), Methodist bishop
- Daniel Ray Hull (1890-1964), landscape architect
- Martin Johnson (1884-1937), adventurer, explorer, and documentary filmmaker
- Jack Knight (1893-1945), Aviation pioneer
- Bessie Anderson Stanley (1879-1952), poet
- Uncas A. Whitaker (1900-1975), engineer, entrepreneur
