= Bessie Anderson Stanley =

American writer (1879–1952)

- Born: Carolina Elizabeth Anderson; March 25, 1879; Newton, Iowa, U.S.
- Died: October 2, 1952 (aged 73)
- Occupation: Writer
- Spouse: Arthur Jehu Stanley (m. 1900)

Bessie Anderson Stanley (born Caroline Elizabeth Anderson; March 25, 1879 – October 2, 1952) was an American writer, the author of the poem "Success" ("What is success?" or "What Constitutes Success?"), which is often incorrectly attributed to Ralph Waldo Emerson or Robert Louis Stevenson.

She was born in Newton, Iowa, and married Arthur Jehu Stanley in 1900, living thereafter in Lincoln, Kansas. Her poem was written in 1904 for a contest held in Brown Book Magazine, by George Livingston Richards Co. of Boston, Massachusetts. Mrs. Stanley submitted the words in the form of an essay, rather than as a poem. The competition was to answer the question "What is success?" in 100 words or less. Mrs. Stanley won the first prize of $250.

== Success ==
The poem Success was in Bartlett's Familiar Quotations in the 1930s or 1940s but was removed in the 1960s. It was again included in the seventeenth edition. However, it does appear in a 1911 book, More Heart Throbs, volume 2, on pages 1–2.

He achieved success who has lived well, laughed often, and loved much;
Who has enjoyed the trust of pure women, the respect of intelligent men and the love of little children;
Who has filled his niche and accomplished his task;
Who has left the world better than he found it,
Whether an improved poppy, a perfect poem, or a rescued soul;
Who has never lacked appreciation of Earth's beauty or failed to express it;
Who has always looked for the best in others and given them the best he had;
Whose life was an inspiration;
Whose memory a benediction.

— Success

== Misattribution ==
Ann Landers (and her sister Abby) are also said to have misattributed the poem to Emerson and her concession to a public correction is in The Ann Landers Encyclopedia.

== Personal life ==
Bessie Anderson Stanley died in 1952, aged 73. The verse is inscribed on her gravestone in Lincoln Cemetery, Kansas.
