= Netawaka, Kansas =

City in Jackson County, Kansas

- City
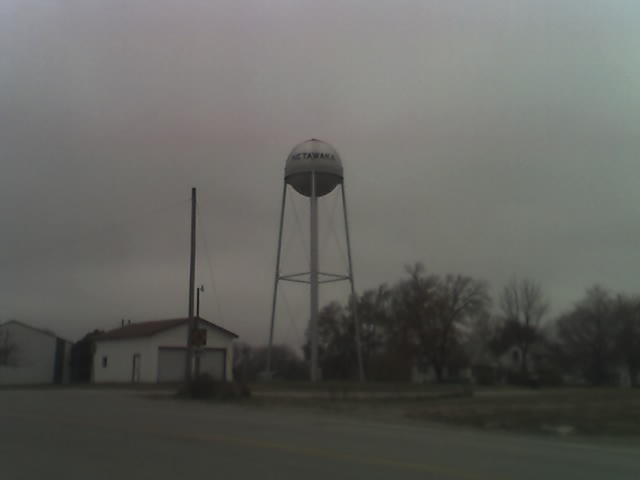
- Netawaka Water Tower (2006)

- Location within Jackson County and Kansas

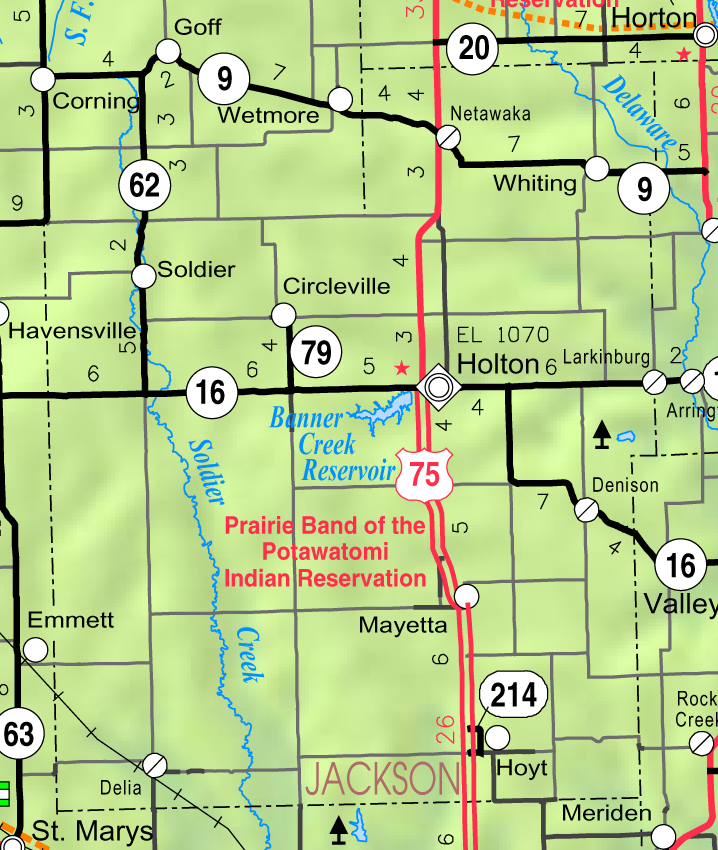
- KDOT map of Jackson County (legend)
- Coordinates: 39°36′11″N 95°43′08″W
- Country: United States
- State: Kansas
- County: Jackson
- Founded: 1866
- Named for: "grand view"

Area
  - Total: 0.97 sq mi (2.51 km^{2})
  - Land: 0.97 sq mi (2.51 km^{2})
  - Water: 0 sq mi (0.00 km^{2})
- Elevation: 1,152 ft (351 m)

Population (2020)
  - Total: 139
  - Density: 143/sq mi (55.4/km^{2})
- Time zone: UTC-6 (CST)
  - Summer (DST): UTC-5 (CDT)
- ZIP Code: 66516
- Area code: 785
- FIPS code: 20-49950
- GNIS ID: 2395177

Netawaka is a city in Jackson County, Kansas, United States. As of the 2020 census, the population of the city was 139.

== History ==
Netawaka was founded in 1866. Netawaka is a Potawatomi name meaning "grand view".

The first post office in Netawaka was established in January 1868.

== Geography ==
According to the United States Census Bureau, the city has a total area of 0.98 square miles (2.54 km^{2}), all land.

== Demographics ==
Historical population
Census	Pop.	Note	%±
1890	267		—
1900	330		23.6%
1910	250		−24.2%
1920	267		6.8%
1930	229		−14.2%
1940	226		−1.3%
1950	213		−5.8%
1960	225		5.6%
1970	192		−14.7%
1980	218		13.5%
1990	167		−23.4%
2000	170		1.8%
2010	143		−15.9%
2020	139		−2.8%
U.S. Decennial Census

=== 2020 census ===
The 2020 United States census counted 139 people, 49 households, and 39 families in Netawaka. The population density was 143.6 per square mile (55.4/km^{2}). There were 61 housing units at an average density of 63.0 per square mile (24.3/km^{2}). The racial makeup was 88.49% (123) white or European American (86.33% non-Hispanic white), 0.0% (0) black or African-American, 3.6% (5) Native American or Alaska Native, 0.0% (0) Asian, 0.72% (1) Pacific Islander or Native Hawaiian, 0.0% (0) from other races, and 7.19% (10) from two or more races. Hispanic or Latino of any race was 2.88% (4) of the population.

Of the 49 households, 28.6% had children under the age of 18; 69.4% were married couples living together; 16.3% had a female householder with no spouse or partner present. 16.3% of households consisted of individuals and 6.1% had someone living alone who was 65 years of age or older. The average household size was 2.2 and the average family size was 2.6. The percent of those with a bachelor's degree or higher was estimated to be 9.4% of the population.

18.7% of the population was under the age of 18, 11.5% from 18 to 24, 15.8% from 25 to 44, 36.0% from 45 to 64, and 18.0% who were 65 years of age or older. The median age was 47.8 years. For every 100 females, there were 107.5 males. For every 100 females ages 18 and older, there were 101.8 males.

The 2016–2020 5-year American Community Survey estimates show that the median household income was $60,000 (with a margin of error of +/- $15,285) and the median family income was $71,250 (+/- $9,650). Males had a median income of $36,250 (+/- $5,416) versus $22,031 (+/- $16,643) for females. The median income for those above 16 years old was $32,656 (+/- $4,589). Approximately, 11.1% of families and 19.1% of the population were below the poverty line, including 38.9% of those under the age of 18 and 12.5% of those ages 65 or over.

=== 2010 census ===
At the 2010 census there were 143 people in 58 households, including 43 families, in the city. The population density was 145.9 inhabitants per square mile (56.3/km^{2}). There were 62 housing units at an average density of 63.3 per square mile (24.4/km^{2}). The racial makeup of the city was 97.9% White, 0.7% African American, and 1.4% Native American. Hispanic or Latino of any race were 1.4%.

Of the 58 households 31.0% had children under the age of 18 living with them, 62.1% were married couples living together, 6.9% had a female householder with no husband present, 5.2% had a male householder with no wife present, and 25.9% were non-families. 24.1% of households were one person and 6.9% were one person aged 65 or older. The average household size was 2.47 and the average family size was 2.88.

The median age was 44.5 years. 23.8% of residents were under the age of 18; 5.6% were between the ages of 18 and 24; 21% were from 25 to 44; 39.2% were from 45 to 64; and 10.5% were 65 or older. The gender makeup of the city was 53.8% male and 46.2% female.

=== 2000 census ===
At the 2000 census there were 170 people in 62 households, including 47 families, in the city. The population density was 174.1 inhabitants per square mile (67.2/km^{2}). There were 66 housing units at an average density of 67.6 per square mile (26.1/km^{2}). The racial makeup of the city was 94.12% White, 5.29% Native American, and 0.59% from two or more races.

Of the 62 households 40.3% had children under the age of 18 living with them, 64.5% were married couples living together, 6.5% had a female householder with no husband present, and 22.6% were non-families. 22.6% of households were one person and 9.7% were one person aged 65 or older. The average household size was 2.74 and the average family size was 3.10.

The age distribution was 31.2% under the age of 18, 5.9% from 18 to 24, 27.1% from 25 to 44, 25.3% from 45 to 64, and 10.6% 65 or older. The median age was 36 years. For every 100 females, there were 123.7 males. For every 100 females age 18 and over, there were 98.3 males.

The median household income was $30,417 and the median family income was $35,000. Males had a median income of $29,688 versus $16,719 for females. The per capita income for the city was $13,705. About 20.5% of families and 19.0% of the population were below the poverty line, including 25.4% of those under the age of eighteen and 45.5% of those sixty five or over.

== Education ==
The community is served by Jackson Heights USD 335 public school district.

== See also ==
- Central Branch Union Pacific Railroad
