= Wright Career College =

Defunct for-profit college

Coordinates: 37.68240°N 97.24732°W

- Former location in Overland Park
- Type: Private, for-profit
- Active: 1921–April 15, 2016
- President: John Mucci (1994–2016)
- Location: Overland Park, Kansas

Wright Career College was a career-oriented school in Overland Park, Kansas, United States, that operated from 1921 until April 15, 2016. It was originally named Dickinson's Business School. The school offered two-year associate degree programs and certificates in healthcare, veterinary, fitness, business, accounting and other related fields.

== History ==
The college was founded in 1921 to train typists for Kansas City businesses and a secretarial program was added in 1953. A shorthand system was developed that became widely accepted in the Kansas City area. Joseph Bryan Dickinson published a book under the title of Dickinson Shorthand in 1928.

James Miller Jr. gained a controlling interest in the school in 1989 and renamed it "Wright Business College". He later changed it to "Wright Career College". The college was reported to have contracted with for-profit corporations owned by its trustees. Wright paid $14 million between 2007 and 2013 to the Miller-owned corporation Media Resources Inc. for advertising expenses. An additional $2.6 million was paid directly to the couple as salaries during the same period. In 2013, hundreds of students filed a lawsuit with accusations of "a systematic, deceptive marketing scheme" and sought a refund of the students' tuition plus unspecified damages.

On April 15, 2016, over a thousand students and 200 staff members at five campus locations were affected when the school closed due to Wright Career College filing for Chapter 7 bankruptcy liquidation under its Corporate name Mission Group Kansas, Inc. (Which held the corporate name since September 1994). All students were notified by email on a Thursday evening that the school would not be open the next day. Many students of the college have worked to file a class-action lawsuit to seek refunds for tuition.
