= Holton, Kansas =

City in Jackson County, Kansas

- City and County seat
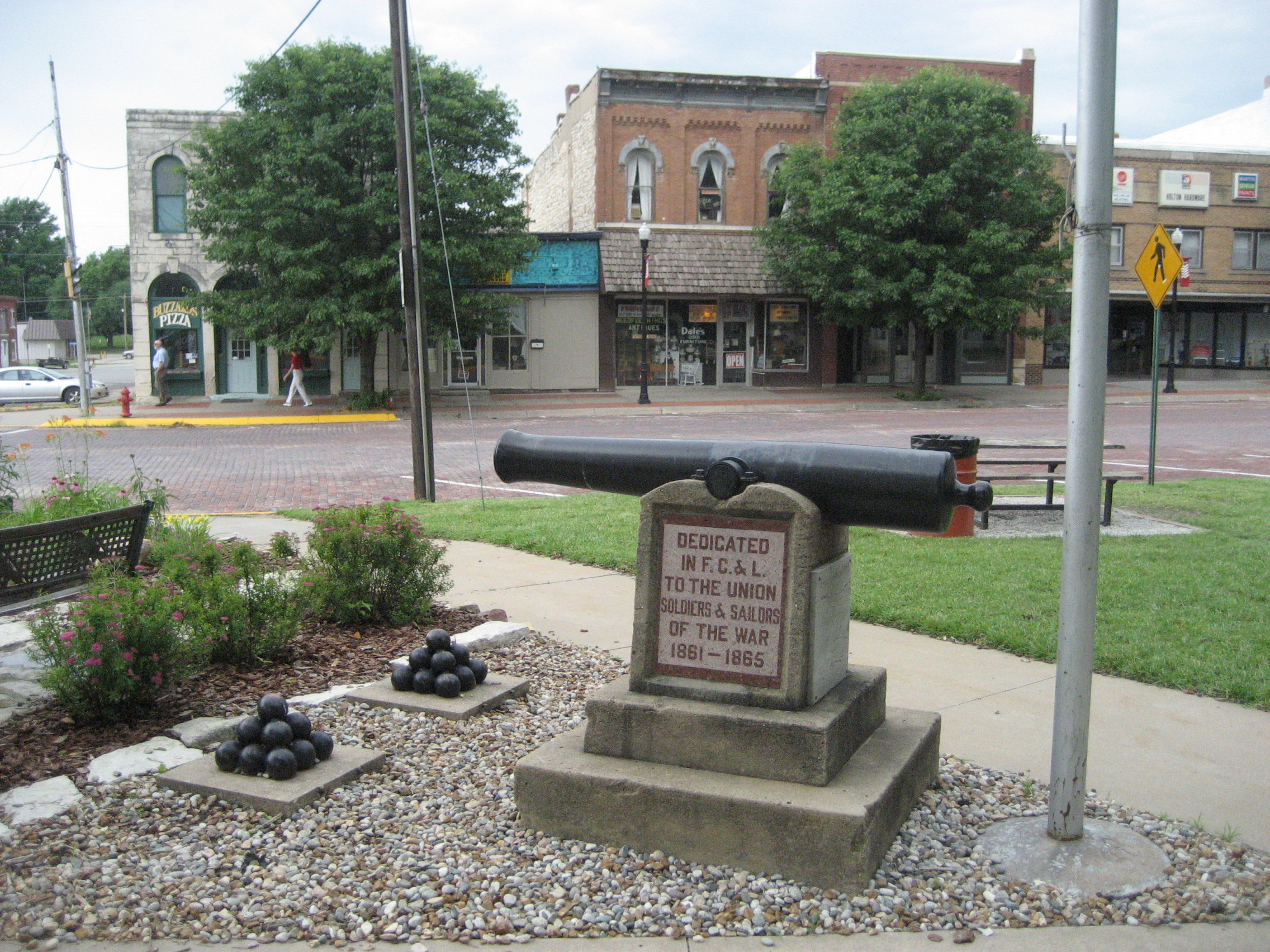
- Downtown Holton (2007)

- Location within Jackson County and Kansas

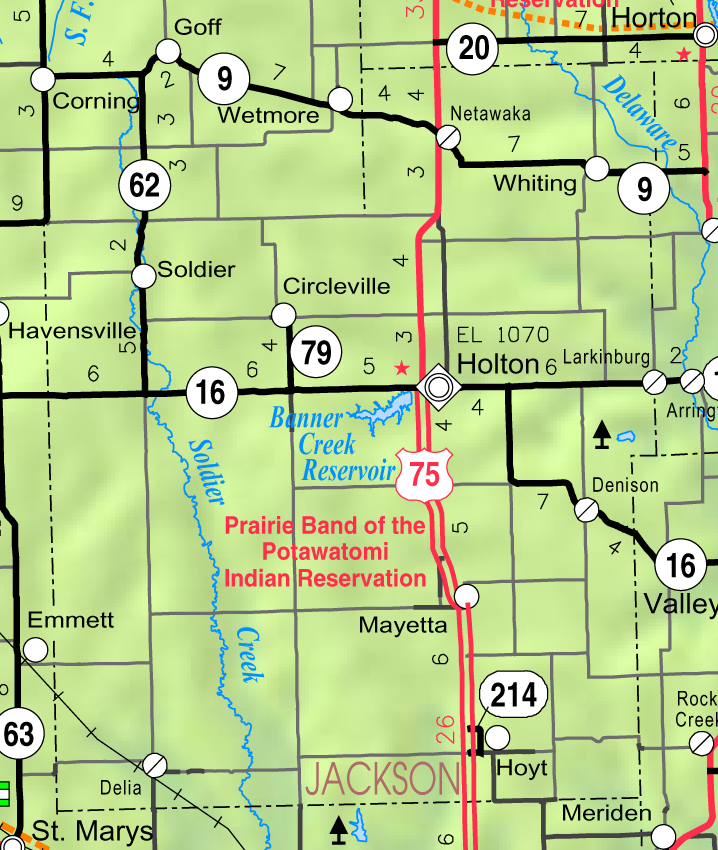
- KDOT map of Jackson County (legend)
- Coordinates: 39°28′11″N 95°44′11″W
- Country: United States
- State: Kansas
- County: Jackson
- Founded: 1856
- Platted: 1857
- Incorporated: 1859
- Named for: Edward Holton

Area
  - Total: 2.76 sq mi (7.15 km^{2})
  - Land: 2.68 sq mi (6.93 km^{2})
  - Water: 0.085 sq mi (0.22 km^{2})
- Elevation: 1,056 ft (322 m)

Population (2020)
  - Total: 3,401
  - Density: 1,270/sq mi (491/km^{2})
- Time zone: UTC-6 (CST)
  - Summer (DST): UTC-5 (CDT)
- ZIP Code: 66436
- Area code: 785
- FIPS code: 20-32825
- GNIS ID: 485594
- Website: holtonkansas.org

Holton is a city in and the county seat of Jackson County, Kansas, United States. As of the 2020 census, the population of the city was 3,401.

== History ==
The party that chose the site of Holton started at Milwaukee, Wisconsin, in May 1856. A train of six covered wagons, each drawn by two yoke of oxen, started the long trek to take Free State settlers to Kansas. They were financed by the Kansas Society of Milwaukee which was headed by Edward Dwight Holton, the Milwaukee abolitionist. They met General James H. Lane with two hundred men at Nebraska City, Nebraska, a rendezvous for Free State men. They followed the Jim Lane Road into Kansas approximately thirty miles. They came to Elk Creek, 2 1/2 miles west of Holton, where they cut timbers to make a bridge, crossed it and made camp where Central School now stands. They liked the two streams (later named Banner Creek and Elk Creek) and the pleasant grassy hills, so they decided to stay. A company was organized and a civil engineer who was with them commenced the survey. They named the new town in honor of Holton.

A log house 20 by 20 feet (6.1 m × 6.1 m) was erected; it was so planned that is could be used for a fort and was known as Jim Lane's Fort. In the spring of 1857, J. B. Ingerson surveyed the townsite lots.

The county that contains Holton was previously named Calhoun County for the pro-slavery South Carolina Senator John C. Calhoun. In 1859 the name was changed to Jackson County. Holton was chosen as the county seat in 1858. A frame building served as the first courthouse on the east side of the square, near the middle of the block. The first courthouse was built in the center of the square in 1872. The present courthouse was completed in 1921.

In 1859, the abolitionist John Brown took a group of escaped slaves through Holton, leading to an incident known as the Battle of the Spurs.

In 1859, Holton had seven dwellings, one store, a blacksmith shop and a steam saw mill. The census taken in April, 1857, gave Holton 291 people; in 1860 the population was 1,936. In 1859 the city was incorporated.

In 1879, the residents of Jackson County, Kansas decided to form a university in Holton. It was funded by mining magnate, A. C. Campbell, a former resident who had moved to Utah, and thus named Campbell University. In 1902 it merged with Lane University and became Campbell College. In 1913, it merged with Kansas City University, then later closed in 1933. The former site of the college later became the location of Holton High School.

== Geography ==
According to the United States Census Bureau, the city has a total area of 2.78 square miles (7.20 km^{2}), of which 2.70 square miles (6.99 km^{2}) is land and 0.08 square miles (0.21 km^{2}) is water.

=== Climate ===
The climate in this area is characterized by hot, humid summers and generally mild to cool winters. According to the Köppen Climate Classification system, Holton has a humid subtropical climate, abbreviated "Cfa" on climate maps.

Climate data for Holton, Kansas (1991–2020 normals, extremes 1902–1904, 1913–1917, 1951–present)
Month	Jan	Feb	Mar	Apr	May	Jun	Jul	Aug	Sep	Oct	Nov	Dec	Year
Record high °F (°C)	75 (24)	81 (27)	89 (32)	93 (34)	99 (37)	109 (43)	110 (43)	110 (43)	109 (43)	97 (36)	85 (29)	74 (23)	110 (43)
Mean maximum °F (°C)	62.3 (16.8)	67.7 (19.8)	77.8 (25.4)	85.2 (29.6)	89.7 (32.1)	93.3 (34.1)	98.5 (36.9)	98.2 (36.8)	93.3 (34.1)	86.3 (30.2)	73.4 (23.0)	64.0 (17.8)	100.4 (38.0)
Mean daily maximum °F (°C)	37.2 (2.9)	43.0 (6.1)	54.1 (12.3)	64.2 (17.9)	73.7 (23.2)	82.8 (28.2)	87.5 (30.8)	86.3 (30.2)	78.7 (25.9)	66.7 (19.3)	53.0 (11.7)	40.9 (4.9)	64.0 (17.8)
Daily mean °F (°C)	26.2 (−3.2)	31.2 (−0.4)	41.7 (5.4)	52.1 (11.2)	62.5 (16.9)	72.3 (22.4)	76.8 (24.9)	75.0 (23.9)	66.8 (19.3)	54.1 (12.3)	41.3 (5.2)	30.3 (−0.9)	52.5 (11.4)
Mean daily minimum °F (°C)	15.2 (−9.3)	19.5 (−6.9)	29.2 (−1.6)	40.0 (4.4)	51.3 (10.7)	61.8 (16.6)	66.1 (18.9)	63.7 (17.6)	54.8 (12.7)	41.4 (5.2)	29.7 (−1.3)	19.6 (−6.9)	41.0 (5.0)
Mean minimum °F (°C)	−4.9 (−20.5)	1.3 (−17.1)	8.2 (−13.2)	23.7 (−4.6)	35.6 (2.0)	48.6 (9.2)	54.9 (12.7)	51.5 (10.8)	39.4 (4.1)	25.2 (−3.8)	13.4 (−10.3)	2.2 (−16.6)	−8.6 (−22.6)
Record low °F (°C)	−22 (−30)	−23 (−31)	−21 (−29)	5 (−15)	22 (−6)	40 (4)	43 (6)	40 (4)	29 (−2)	14 (−10)	−7 (−22)	−23 (−31)	−23 (−31)
Average precipitation inches (mm)	0.79 (20)	1.33 (34)	2.17 (55)	3.72 (94)	4.98 (126)	4.88 (124)	4.76 (121)	4.35 (110)	3.77 (96)	3.33 (85)	1.84 (47)	1.46 (37)	37.38 (949)
Average precipitation days (≥ 0.01 in)	4.4	4.9	7.0	9.5	11.4	9.8	9.5	8.6	8.3	7.3	6.2	4.4	91.3
Source: NOAA

== Demographics ==
Historical population
Census	Pop.	Note	%±
1890	2,727		—
1900	3,082		13.0%
1910	2,842		−7.8%
1920	2,703		−4.9%
1930	2,705		0.1%
1940	2,885		6.7%
1950	2,705		−6.2%
1960	3,028		11.9%
1970	3,063		1.2%
1980	3,132		2.3%
1990	3,196		2.0%
2000	3,353		4.9%
2010	3,329		−0.7%
2020	3,401		2.2%
U.S. Decennial Census

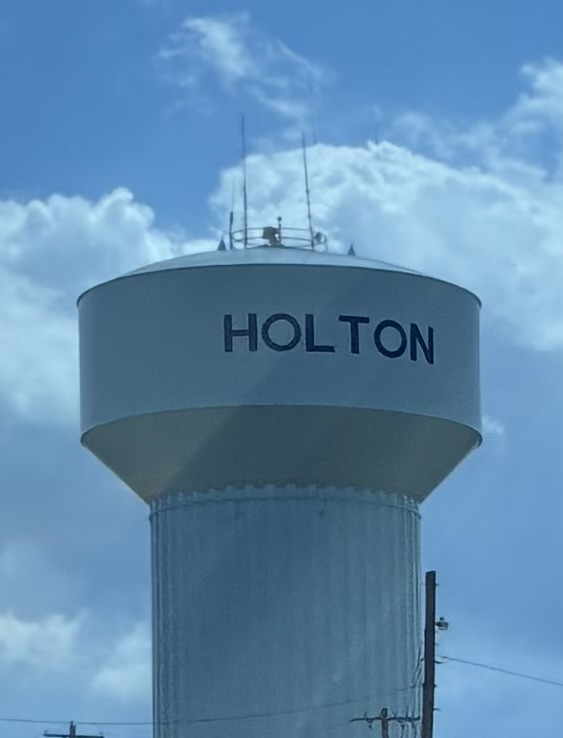
Holton watertower (2025)

Holton is part of the Topeka metropolitan area.

=== 2020 census ===
As of the 2020 census, Holton had 3,401 people, 1,410 households, and 784 families. The population density was 1,270.9 inhabitants per square mile (490.7/km^{2}). There were 1,599 housing units at an average density of 597.5 per square mile (230.7/km^{2}).

0.0% of residents lived in urban areas, while 100.0% lived in rural areas.

Of the 1,410 households, 29.8% had children under the age of 18 living in them. Of all households, 38.6% were married-couple households, 18.6% were households with a male householder and no spouse or partner present, and 35.8% were households with a female householder and no spouse or partner present. About 38.9% of all households were made up of individuals, and 19.6% had someone living alone who was 65 years of age or older. The average household size was 2.0 and the average family size was 2.7.

The median age was 39.2 years. 24.7% of residents were under the age of 18, 8.1% were ages 18 to 24, 23.5% were ages 25 to 44, 22.0% were ages 45 to 64, and 21.7% were age 65 or older. For every 100 females, there were 90.1 males, and for every 100 females age 18 and over, there were 87.2 males.

Of the 1,599 housing units, 11.8% were vacant. The homeowner vacancy rate was 3.0% and the rental vacancy rate was 7.7%.

Racial composition as of the 2020 census
Race	Number	Percent
White	2,846	83.7%
Black or African American	62	1.8%
American Indian and Alaska Native	113	3.3%
Asian	20	0.6%
Native Hawaiian and Other Pacific Islander	4	0.1%
Some other race	91	2.7%
Two or more races	265	7.8%
Hispanic or Latino (of any race)	303	8.9%

The non-Hispanic White population was 80.62% of the total population.

=== Demographic estimates ===
The percent of those with a bachelor's degree or higher was estimated to be 15.3% of the population.

=== Income and poverty ===
The 2016–2020 5-year American Community Survey estimates show that the median household income was $47,642 (with a margin of error of +/- $7,001) and the median family income was $60,909 (+/- $10,042). Males had a median income of $36,654 (+/- $4,920) versus $16,098 (+/- $2,777) for females. The median income for those above 16 years old was $21,928 (+/- $4,959). Approximately, 14.8% of families and 16.4% of the population were below the poverty line, including 21.1% of those under the age of 18 and 1.8% of those ages 65 or over.

=== 2010 census ===
As of the census of 2010, there were 3,329 people, 1,442 households, and 832 families living in the city. The population density was 1,233.0 inhabitants per square mile (476.1/km^{2}). There were 1,652 housing units at an average density of 611.9 per square mile (236.3/km^{2}). The racial makeup of the city was 89.7% White, 1.1% African American, 3.4% Native American, 0.6% Asian, 2.0% from other races, and 3.2% from two or more races. Hispanic or Latino of any race were 4.9% of the population.

There were 1,442 households, of which 29.6% had children under the age of 18 living with them, 41.9% were married couples living together, 12.3% had a female householder with no husband present, 3.5% had a male householder with no wife present, and 42.3% were non-families. 37.9% of all households were made up of individuals, and 20.3% had someone living alone who was 65 years of age or older. The average household size was 2.23 and the average family size was 2.95.

The median age in the city was 40.2 years. 24.5% of residents were under the age of 18; 8.1% were between the ages of 18 and 24; 22.9% were from 25 to 44; 23.8% were from 45 to 64; and 20.5% were 65 years of age or older. The gender makeup of the city was 46.6% male and 53.4% female.

== Education ==
The community is served by Holton USD 336 public school district and Holton High School.

Jackson Heights USD 335, located 4 miles north of Holton, is a nearby school district but it doesn't serve the city of Holton.

== Notable people ==
- Case Broderick, politician
- Bill James, baseball writer and statistician
- Lynn Jenkins, U.S. Congresswoman and House Republican Conference Vice-Chair, graduate of Holton High School
- Kendall McComas, child actor, Our Gang
- Harold B. Minor, diplomat
- Danny J. Petersen, posthumous Medal of Honor recipient
- Frank C. Pomeroy, state legislator
- Pat Roberts, U.S. Senator and 1954 graduate of Holton High School
- Robin Utterback, artist
- Bernice T. Van der Vries, Illinois state legislator, was born in Holton.
