= Kansas Christian College (Lincoln) =

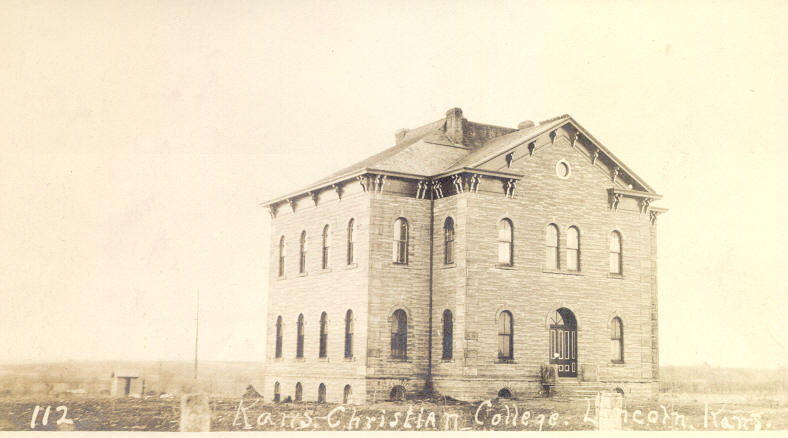
Kansas Christian College

Kansas Christian College was an institution of higher learning located in Lincoln, Kansas, United States. It was established in 1882, began classes in 1885, and continued operations until 1913.
