= Great Western Business and Normal College =

The Great Western Business and Normal College (sometimes called "Concordia Normal School and Business College" or "Concordia Business College") located in Concordia, Kansas was a private business college and normal school. The school was founded in 1889 by L. H. Hausam. Records show students attending as late as 1930.

The college eventually moved its operations to Webb City, Missouri

== Alumni ==
- Frank Carlson, governor of Kansas

== Gallery ==
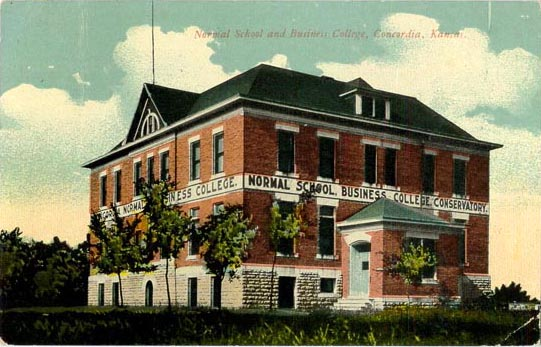
Postcard showing original building

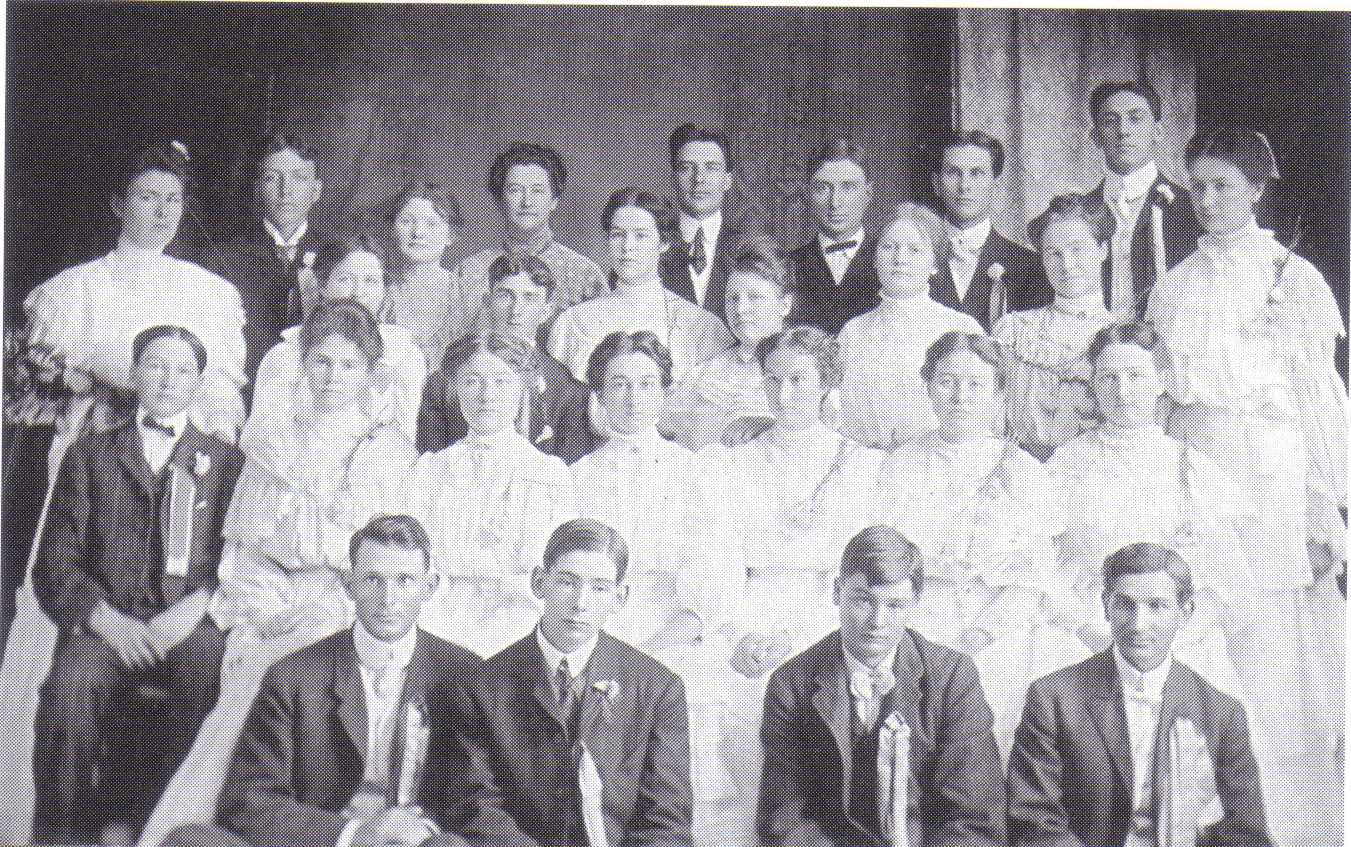
Graduating class of 1905

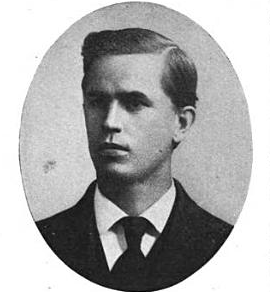
L. H. Hausam, founder of the college
