= L. H. Hausam =

American professor (1870–1941)

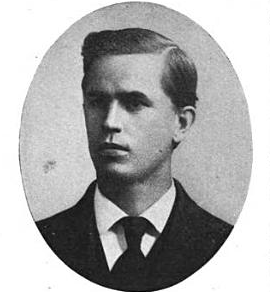
Photograph of L. H. Hausam

Louis Henry Hausam (June 14, 1870 – January 13, 1941) was a professor of writing and graphology in the United States. He was president of the Hausam School of Penmanship in Hutchinson, Kansas, and founded Great Western Business and Normal College in Concordia, Kansas.

Hausam published the "New Education in Penmanship" in 1898, called "the greatest work of the kind ever published." He authored other textbooks on writing, penmanship, and graphology while actively working with several business colleges of his day.
