= Orchard Supply Hardware =

Former home improvement retailer

Orchard Supply Hardware, LLC

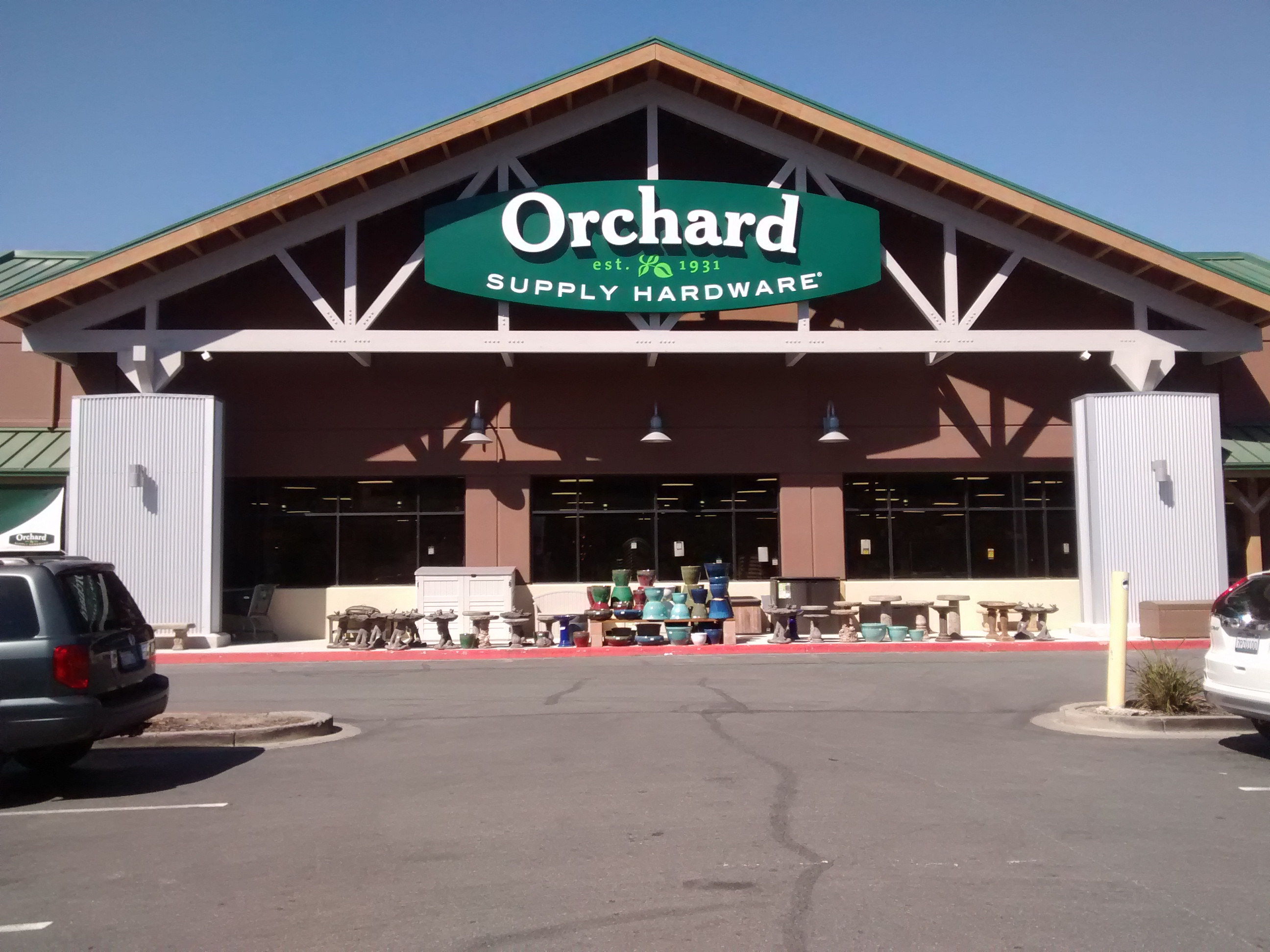
- Company type: Subsidiary
- Traded as: NASDAQ: OSH (2012–13)
- Industry: Retail – Home Improvement
- Founded: San Jose, California (1931; 95 years ago) (2020; 6 years ago) as Outdoor Supply Hardware
- Defunct: November 2018; 7 years ago (original company)
- Fate: Chapter 11 bankruptcy; Liquidation sale; Shut down by Lowe's in 2018; Rebranded to Outdoor Supply Hardware after purchase of brand name and intellectual property by Central Network Retail Group
- Headquarters: San Jose, California, USA
- Number of locations: 99 (Before closure)
- Products: Home improvement and gardening products
- Number of employees: 5,400
- Parent: W. R. Grace and Company (1979–1986); Wickes (1986–1989); Sears (1996–2005); Sears Holdings (2005–2012); Lowe's (2013–2018); Central Network Retail Group (CNRG) (2019–present) (revival as Outdoor Supply Hardware)

Orchard Supply Hardware (OSH) was an American retailer of home improvement and gardening products. Headquartered in San Jose, California, Orchard Supply Hardware had dozens of locations throughout California, with expansions into Oregon and Florida.

After starting as a non-profit cooperative in 1931, the company later turned into a for-profit corporation before it was bought and sold by a number of different corporations during the 1980s. In 1996, the company was acquired by Sears. After a brief period as a public company in 2012–13, the company filed for a Chapter 11 reorganization. In 2013, the bulk of OSH's assets and locations were purchased by the home improvement store chain, Lowe's. For the next five years, the chain was operated as a subsidiary of Lowe's and used for strategic expansion of retail operations. All stores were closed in November 2018.

In January 2020, the Memphis-based Central Network Retail Group purchased the OSH brand from Lowe's.

== History ==
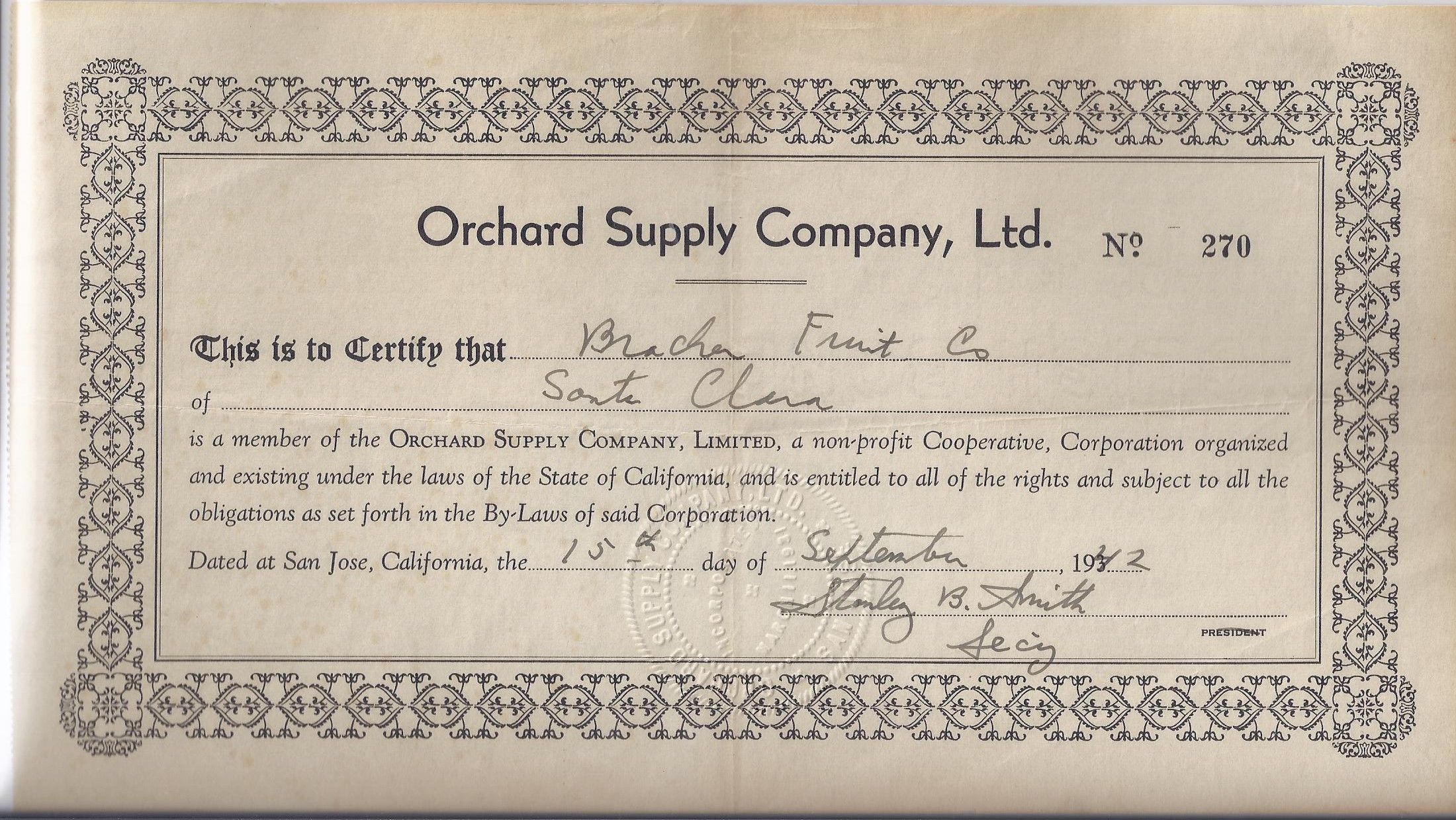
Co-op member certificate from 1942 signed by founder Stanley B. Smith

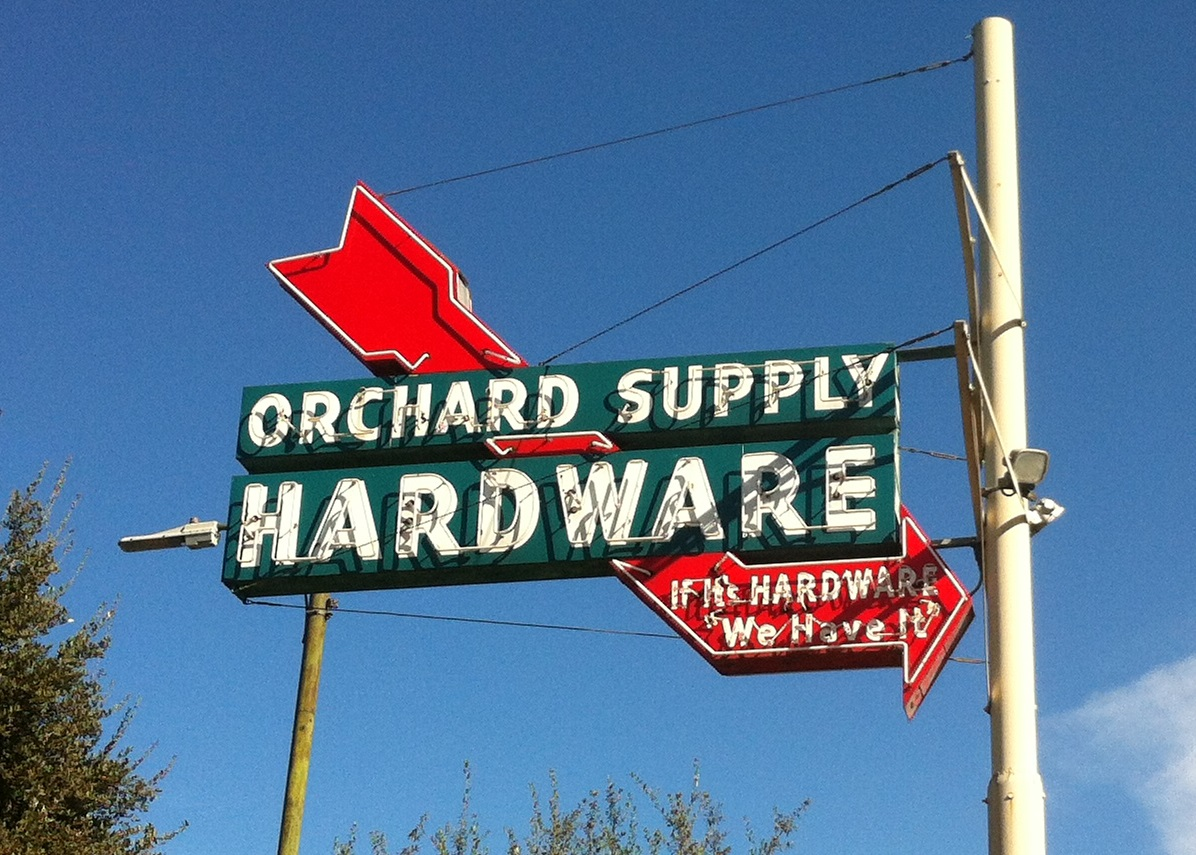
Original neon sign for Orchard Supply Hardware, store #3, at 720 W San Carlos Street, San Jose, CA, as shown in 2013

Orchard Supply was formed in 1931 as the Orchard Supply Farmers Co-op by 30 farmers, consisting mostly of orchardists and fruit tree ranchers who banded together to form a cooperative to buy essential farm supplies. Each farmer put up $30 and in the midst of the Great Depression a new company was formed. Stanley B. Smith served as the company's first general manager and president.

Operations started in a rented warehouse at 230 Bassett Street in San Jose, California. In spite of the Great Depression, the cooperative was successful. In 1933 the co-op had moved to a larger location at 44 Vine Street in San Jose. The new location featured a large retail display area, off-street parking, and an adjoining warehouse.

In 1946, the company moved to a site at 720 West San Carlos Street in San Jose. By then, there were almost 2,000 members. In 1962, Albert B. Smith (Stanley's son) became president, expanding the business into a chain of stores which, at 25,000 square feet (2,300 m^{2}) each, were considered large at the time.

By 1950, the electronics industry began booming in the Santa Clara Valley, and with it came an abundance of new home owners in the San Francisco Bay Area. The orchards gradually became residential neighborhoods, and the "Orchard Supply Farmers Co-op" became a for-profit corporation, "Orchard Supply Hardware" retail stores.

In 1977, the company purchased a 19-acre warehouse and office complex from Sunsweet Growers to serve as a distribution center. In the 1980s, Loren S. Smith (another son of Stanley) became president and continued the expansion. In 1992 the distribution center was moved to Tracy, California.

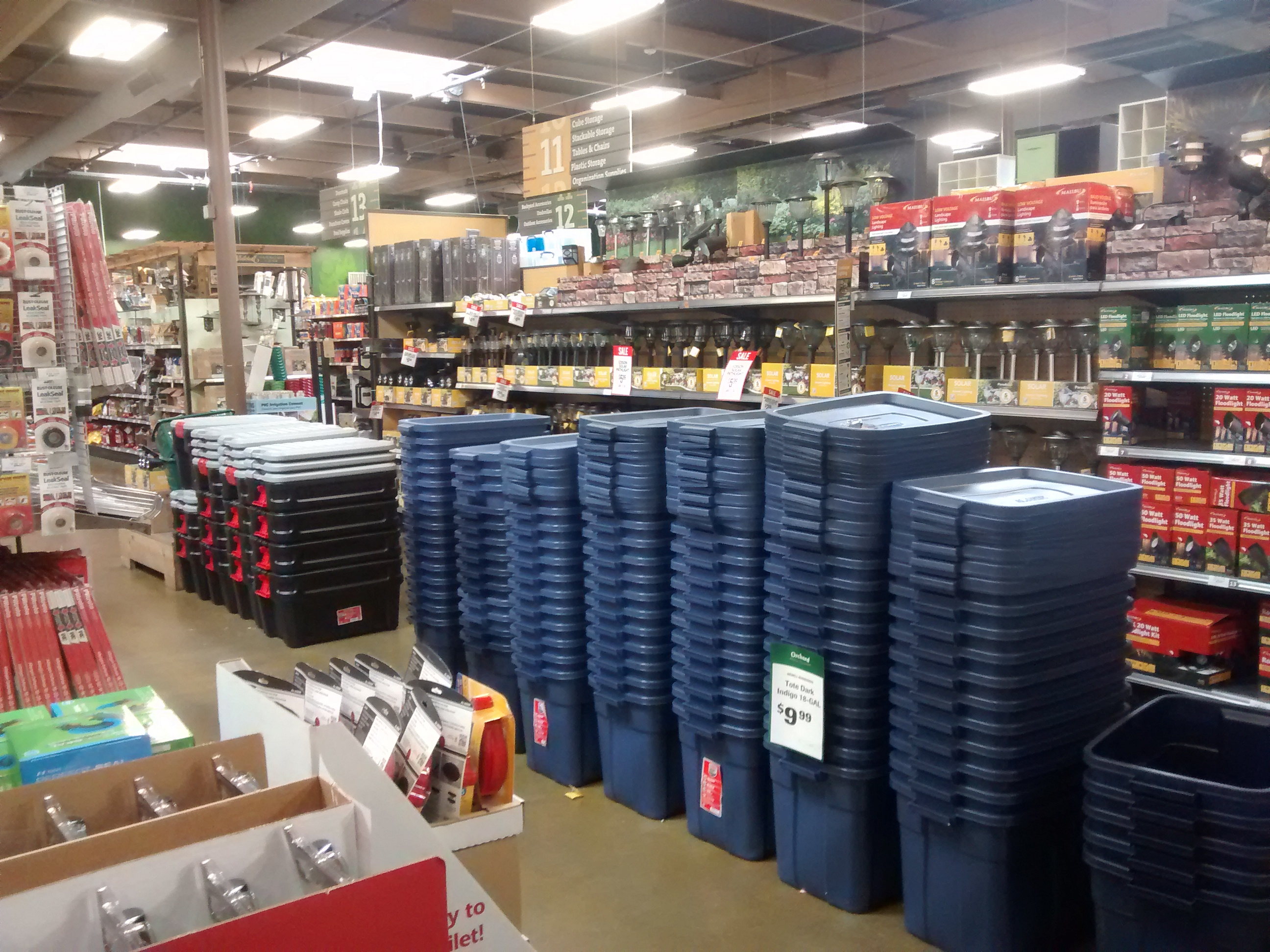
Interior of an Orchard Supply Hardware store in San Rafael, California as shown in 2016

=== Corporate acquisitions ===
Orchard Supply Hardware ceased to be a privately owned company when it and its seven stores were acquired by the conglomerate W.R. Grace and Company in 1979.

W.R. Grace began to sell off its 660-store retail division piecemeal in 1985. OSH and another hardware chain, Home Centers West, were sold to Wickes Companies in May 1986.

Wickes had already owned the Builders Emporium hardware chain. It was restructuring after emerging from bankruptcy under the leadership of turnaround specialist Sanford Sigoloff. Under Wickes ownership, OSH grew to 31 stores in California, and was spun out again April 1989. The $134 million management buyout was led by OSH president Maynard Jenkins and Freeman Spogli & Company.

In March 1993, OSH made an initial public offering on the New York Stock Exchange under the symbol ORH. In the same year, OSH expanded into Southern California by acquiring several hardware stores from the Builders Emporium chain when the former sibling chain went out of business.

OSH was purchased by Sears in 1996 after seven years of independence. By the end of 2000, OSH had grown to 274 stores. In 2005, Sears sold a 19.9% interest in the company to Ares Management of Los Angeles for US$58.7 million, announcing expansion plans at the time. Ares had the option to later purchase another 30.2% stake in the company for US$126.8 million, but did not exercise this right. OSH had eighty-four stores at the time.

At roughly the same time, Sears Holdings announced that its Sears, Roebuck & Co. subsidiary expected to receive a dividend from OSH of about US$450 million. In connection with the initial investment, OSH was expected to issue US$405 million in debt. This debt was later cited as one of the primary reasons for its 2013 Chapter 11 filing.

Mark Baker took over leadership of OSH as President and CEO in March 2011. Mr. Baker was a veteran of the major hardware chains HomeBase, Home Depot, Scotty's, as well as Gander Mountain and Scotts Miracle-Gro companies.

OSH was spun out of Sears Holdings in 2012 and became a public company. In January 2012 shares began trading on the Nasdaq stock market under the symbol OSH.

==== Expansion ====
In April 2013, OSH expanded beyond California, opening stores in the suburban Portland metropolitan area of Oregon.

=== Bankruptcy and Lowe's acquisition ===
On June 17, 2013, Orchard Supply Hardware announced it filed for Chapter 11 under the U.S. bankruptcy code and that most of its assets would be sold to the Lowe's Home Improvement chain for $205M in cash. Lowe's agreed to acquire no fewer than sixty of the (at the time) ninety-one Orchard Supply stores, operating them separately from Lowe's. At the close of the process, Orchard Supply remained a separate brand and operating entity from the Lowe's chain.

In August 2013, preparations were made to close seventeen of the ninety-nine stores. Two of the stores were closed in June as a part of normal operations. This left seventy of the pre-Chapter 11 announcement stores still in operation. According to a company spokesperson, workers at the stores that closed were not eligible for severance pay due to the bankruptcy proceeding, but Orchard Supply is "providing incentive bonuses to key employees." Lowe's also committed to investing US$200 million in OSH over the next five years.

In November 2014, the company opened its first location in the city of San Francisco. The North Beach store located at 2598 Taylor Street was a former Petco and had a planned June 2015 opening. The store represented a new strategy for Lowe's to enter urban regions and markets using the OSH brand. This was following the opening of a store in the population dense Mid-Wilshire district of Los Angeles. In 2016, Lowe's announced the expansion of the Orchard brand to South Florida.

==== Lowe's robotics ====
Via a technology program launched initially by Lowe's in 2014, OSH announced a pilot program using "robot employees" at their San Jose store at 377 Royal Avenue. The devices, called OSHbots, were supplied by a Mountain View, California, company called Fellow Robots. The OSHbots resembled white columns with two large LCD screens and were equipped with 3D cameras, so they could identify items brought in by customers, and had wheels on either side that helped them move. Customers could research items on the screens and then the robot could lead them to the aisle where an item was located. The robots spoke English and Spanish and were connected to an inventory database so they could inform customers if an item was out of stock.

=== Post-Lowes ===
On August 22, 2018, Lowe's publicly announced that Orchard Supply Hardware would be closed down nationwide, and would begin liquidation. It said stores would be closed by the following February, and all had been closed by November.

==== Outdoor Supply Hardware ====
In 2019, Central Network Retail Group (CNRG) purchased leases to 7 former OSH locations in the San Francisco Bay Area. New hardware stores in these locations were branded "Outdoor Supply Hardware", and kept a similar appearance and experience as the old OSH stores. CNRG bought the full "Orchard Supply Hardware" trademark in January 2020.

== Marketing ==
=== Boxcar ===
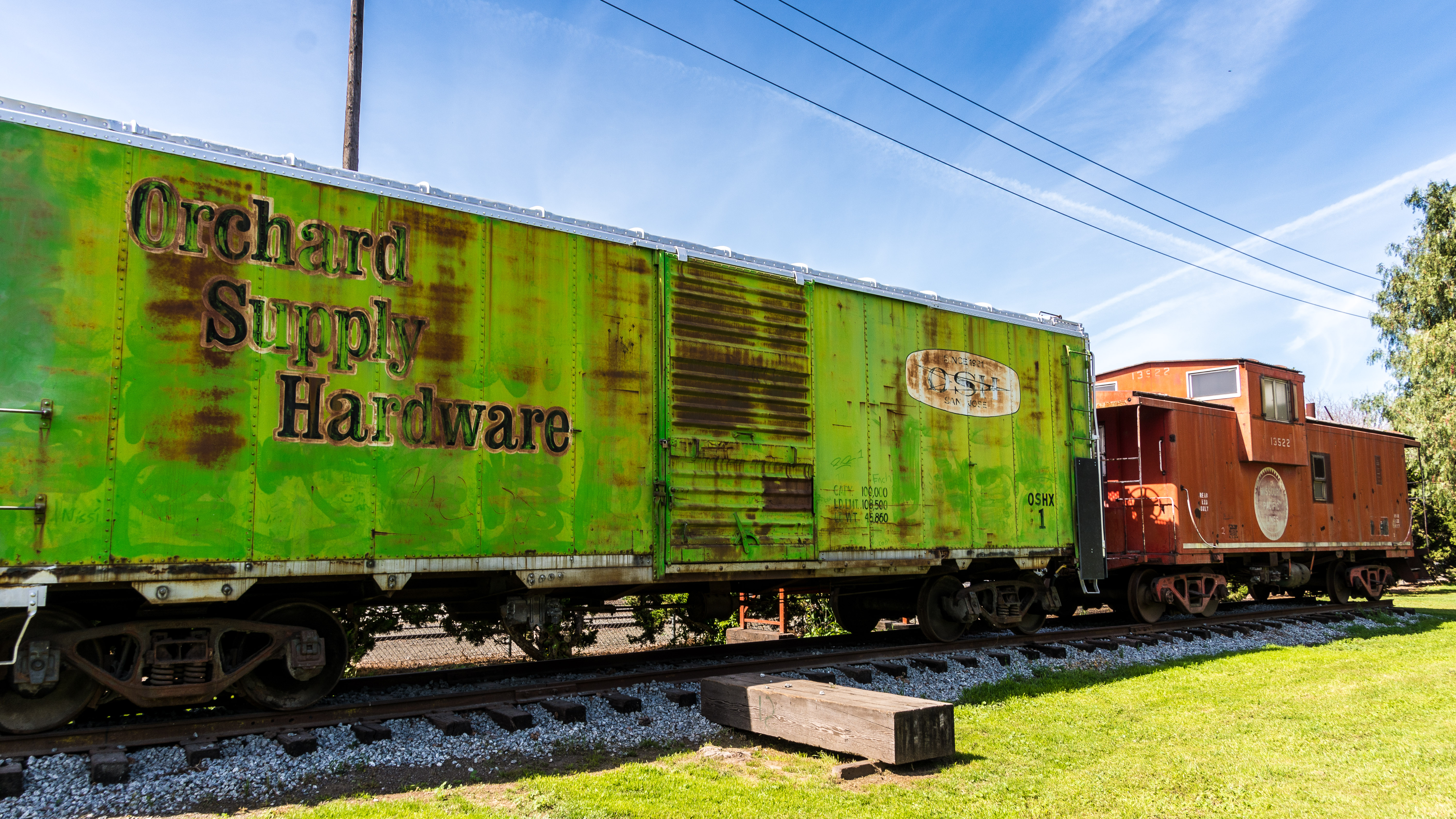
Orchard Supply Hardware boxcar (OSHX 1) at History Park at Kelley Park

In the early 1960s, the city of San Jose denied Al Smith permission to install a sign along Auzerais Street to promote his Orchard Supply Hardware store because a sign for the store already existed facing San Carlos Street. Undeterred, Smith bought a railroad boxcar from Southern Pacific, painted the car with the OSH logo, and placed it at the end of the spur track behind his store and alongside Auzerais Street. It remained in that spot for nearly 50 years, and was occasionally featured in OSH's promotional material. Recognizing its historic relationship to the San Jose community, OSH donated the boxcar to the California Trolley and Railroad Corporation in 2013 for display in History Park at Kelley Park.

=== Calendars ===
Originally conceived as a marketing program, company president, Al Smith who had worked for the Southern Pacific Railroad, had a love of trains and is credited with the theme. One aspect that initially made these calendars unique was that all original paintings were commissioned as artwork for each month. The theme of these calendars has primarily been trains and railroad history, with only a few diversions, including the 1981 calendar which celebrated the Santa Clara Valley. Other images have featured landscapes, steam-powered machines, automobiles, historical drawings, produce from the Santa Clara Valley.

From 1975 until 1992, railroad artist and local politician Michael Kotowski created each painting with the exception of the 1977 and 1979 calendars. The 1977 edition was a selection of “Still Live” paintings by the Santa Cruz Art League and the 1979 edition was a series of Southwestern style paintings by Northern California artist Anthony Quartuccio, Sr. The 1982 calendar had a flight and aviation theme called “Up, Up and Away” for which Kotowski created the original artwork even though it was not train related. Kotowski did the layout design and production on the entire series under his tenure as artist.

OSH's calendars have featured the works of twenty-three different artists who have created over 450 unique pieces including railroad artists such as Kotowski, John Winfield, James R Mann, 2017 Calendar, and Ken Muramoto; Muramoto has the distinction of being the youngest artist to provide paintings for the calendar.
