= J.M. McDonald =

American businessman (1881–1956)

James M. McDonald (July 20, 1881 – September 21, 1956) was an American retailing executive. He helped to build the JCPenney department store chain, as well as a chain of department stores under his own name.

== History ==
James M. McDonald Sr. was born July 20, 1881, in Kingston, Missouri, the fourth of five sons of Daniel G. McDonald, who operated a mercantile store in Hamilton, Missouri, that was part of a chain called the Cash-Cowgill Company. Working for his father gave McDonald his first taste of the merchandising business.

In April 1905, McDonald moved to Kemmerer, Wyoming to assist James Cash Penney, a former neighbor of his in Hamilton, in operating his first store. After about six months in Kemmerer, McDonald went to Spokane, Washington, to assists his brothers in a department store venture there. McDonald married Josephine Armstrong in December 1910 in Spokane. In 1911, McDonald rejoined Penney as an assistant manager in his 25th store in Pendleton, Oregon. In the spring of 1912, McDonald was promoted to manager of the Penney store in Moscow, Idaho. In 1914, he was promoted to Penney's headquarters in New York City. McDonald became a member of Penney's board of directors and, in 1921, was made a vice president of the company and was put in charge of merchandising and new store acquisitions. He headed those departments until his retirement in 1929.

=== J.M. McDonald department stores ===
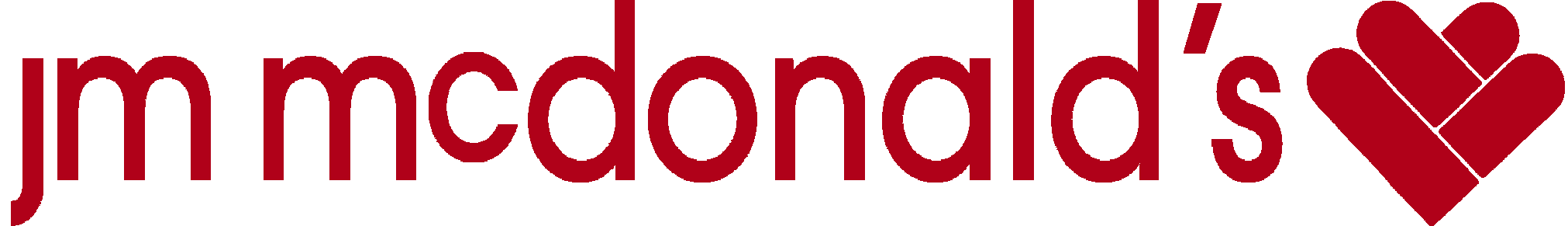
JM McDonald's department store logo

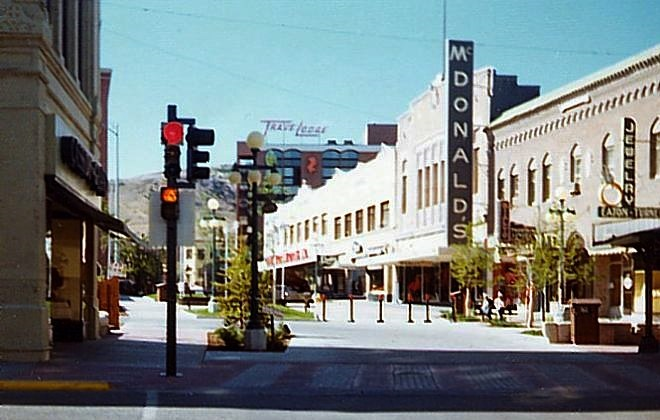
J. M. McDonald's Department Store, Helena, Montana

For the next seven years after his retirement, McDonald maintained an office in New York City doing consulting work with manufacturers, retailers, and wholesalers. He became acquainted with Ebden Brown of the Brown-Ekberg Company of Holdrege, Nebraska, a department store that was in financial trouble. Following a 1934 luncheon with Brown, McDonald bought out Brown's partner, Harry Ekberg, the store was renamed Brown-McDonald, and the company opened four new stores in the next three years. The company's headquarters was moved to Hastings, Nebraska in 1936.

McDonald's brother, D.G. McDonald, headed the company from 1937 until his death in 1947. McDonald briefly retook the reins after D.G.'s death; in 1948, his son, J.M. McDonald Jr., was named president. The chain continued to expand throughout the Midwest and Western states, and it eventually took on the J.M. McDonald name.

The department store chain was sold in 1968 to Gamble-Skogmo Inc., which continued to operate the stores. Gamble-Skogmo was sold to Wickes Companies in 1980. Wickes filed for bankruptcy in 1982, and the J.M. McDonald stores were liquidated by the end of 1983 as part of Wickes' restructuring.

== Farming and philanthropy ==
In the mid-1920s, McDonald purchased a farm in Cortland, New York, where he established a small herd of purebred Guernsey cattle. It eventually became one of the most prominent Guernsey herds in the country. Upon his death, Mr. McDonald bequeathed the nucleus of the McDonald Farms herd of 365 head to Cornell University in Ithaca, New York, to be maintained for a long-time breeding research program. About 1,700 acres of farmland and all the equipment were also included.

McDonald was also a major donor to the School of the Ozarks in Missouri, where he funded rebuilding of the school museum, an updated machine shop and a new hospital.

In 1952, he established the J.M. McDonald Foundation, which awards grants in education, humanities, health, and a variety of social and human services, primarily in upstate New York. The foundation has also funded projects in Hastings, Nebraska, where the department store was headquartered, including a planetarium at the Hastings Museum.
