= California Hardware Company =

American wholesale hardware distributor

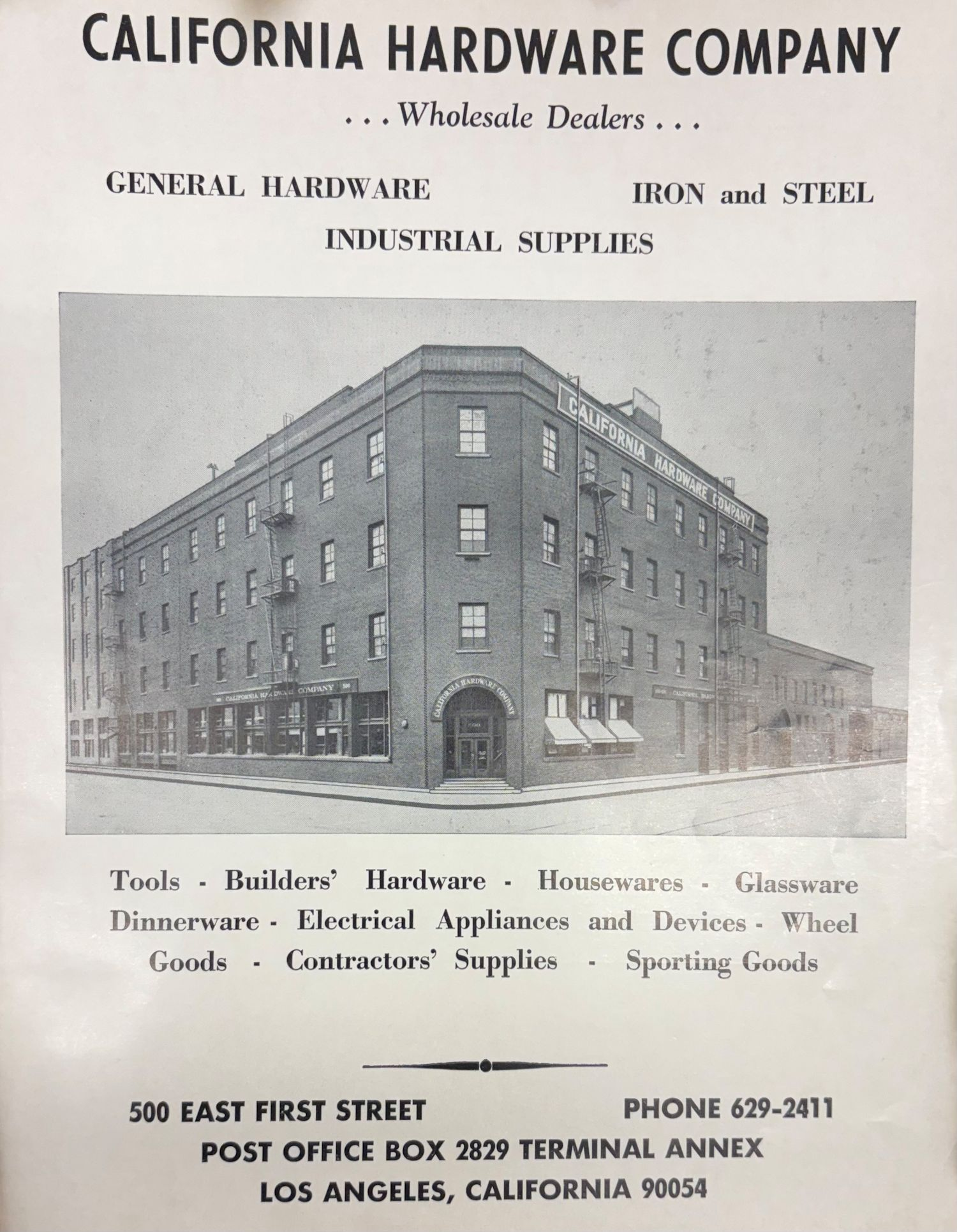
Title page of California Hardware Company's 5,000 page product catalog. The building shown was constructed in 1915.

California Hardware Company was a wholesale hardware distributor based in Los Angeles. Founded in 1892, the company supplied housewares, tools, plumbing, and electrical supplies in the Western United States. Customers included hardware dealers, lumberyards, and home centers in California, Nevada, Oregon, and Arizona. The company operated a 400,000 square-foot warehouse and office.

== History ==
=== Early years ===
The company was founded by John A. Henderson (1844–1915) and William F. Marshall (1851–1922) following earlier ventures in hardware and building materials. Henderson, a Civil War veteran, moved to Los Angeles after the war and entered the hardware business in 1875. Marshall arrived in Los Angeles in 1876 and worked with Henderson to establish the company.

The Company was initially located at 128 S. Spring Street, and later moved to 115–119 S. Los Angeles Street. The company operated as a regional supplier, providing goods to builders, contractors, and merchants during a period of rapid urban growth in Los Angeles.

=== Growth ===
By 1915, the company relocated to a larger facility at 500 E. 1st Street, at the SE corner of Alameda and 1st Streets. Shannon Crandall Sr. (1871–1964) joined the company in 1897 and became president in 1918, holding the position until 1949. Shannon Crandall Jr. (1902–1966) became president in 1950. During his tenure, the company grew and joined the Los Angeles Chamber of Commerce and the Federal Reserve Industrial Advisory Committee.

By the mid-20th century, California Hardware expanded its distribution network across several Western states. In 1974, California Hardware acquired Baker & Hamilton Hardware, a San Francisco-based company founded in 1849.

=== Challenges and acquisition ===
By the 1990s, the company relocated its headquarters to a 411,400‑square‑foot distribution center at 3601 E. Jurupa Street in Ontario, California. However, the company faced growing financial pressures. The rise of big-box retailers such as Home Depot, Builders Emporium, and HomeBase during the 1980s and 1990s created growing competition for independent hardware stores.

In 1997, Amarillo Hardware Company, a Texas-based distributor, acquired California Hardware's assets. This acquisition created one of the largest hardware distributors in the Southwestern United States, with combined facilities of over 500,000 square feet.

Amarillo Hardware struggled under competition from large retailers and e-commerce. It went out of business in 2014.
