= Aldens =

Aldens may refer to:

- Aldens (department store), American mail order company
- Alden Shoe Company, American shoe manufacturer
