= Radford Studio Center =

Television and film studio in Los Angeles

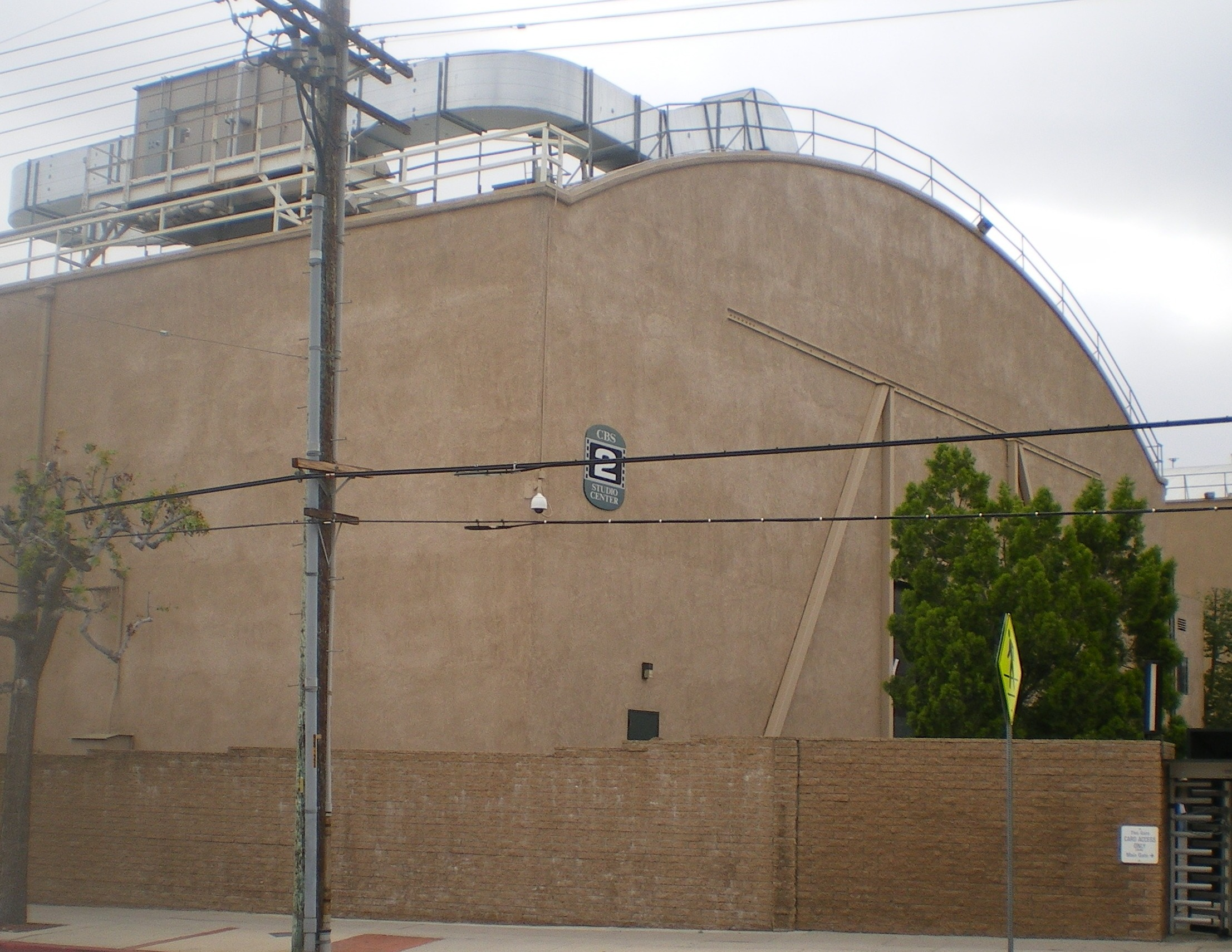
- Radford Studio Center, Soundstage 2 in Los Angeles

- Location within San Fernando Valley
- Alternative names: CBS Studio Center; CBS Radford

General information
- Type: Television studios
- Location: Studio City, Los Angeles, 4024 Radford Avenue; Studio City, California 91604
- Coordinates: 34.144692°N 118.391008°W
- Inaugurated: May 1928; 98 years ago
- Owner: Hackman Capital Partners; Square Mile Capital Management; Netflix, Inc. (pending)
- Operator: Radford Studio Center, Inc.

Design and construction
- Architect: Mack Sennett

Website
- www.radfordstudiocenter.com

Radford Studio Center, alternatively CBS Studio Center, is a television and film studio located in the Studio City district in the San Fernando Valley of Los Angeles, California, United States. The lot has 18 sound stages from 7,000 to 25,000 square feet (700 to 2,300 m^{2}), 220,000 square feet (20,000 m^{2}) of office space, and 223 dressing rooms. The triangular site is bisected by the Los Angeles River. In 2021, ViacomCBS (later Paramount Global and currently known as Skydance Corporation), the parent company of CBS, sold Studio Center to real estate investment companies Hackman Capital Partners and Square Mile Capital Management.

ViacomCBS also previously had ownership of two other studios in the area: CBS Television City and Columbia Square.

== History ==
Mack Sennett, a silent film producer and director, came to the San Fernando Valley and opened his new movie studio at this location (at what is now Ventura Boulevard and Radford Avenue) in May 1928. He previously operated a smaller studio on Glendale Boulevard in Echo Park (then called Edendale) where he produced films featuring the Keystone Cops, Charlie Chaplin, Mabel Normand, Buster Keaton, W. C. Fields, and Fatty Arbuckle.

Five years after creating the Studio City lot, Sennett was forced to file for bankruptcy and the studio lot was sold to Mascot Pictures. Mascot, which specialized in serials, renamed the studio after itself. By 1935, another film company, Monogram Pictures, along with Mascot and Consolidated Film Corporation merged to form Republic Pictures Corporation. The studio lot was renamed Republic Studios. The new studio specialized in B-movies, including many Westerns starring the likes of Roy Rogers, Gene Autry, and John Wayne, all of whom gained their first breaks with Republic.

In the 1950s, Republic leased studio space to Revue Productions, which filmed many early television series on the lot (including early episodes of Leave It to Beaver) before Revue's owner, MCA acquired Universal Pictures and moved Revue's television production to Universal City. Also, Four Star Productions leased the lot for many of its series like The Rifleman, Dick Powell's Zane Grey Theater, and The Big Valley. Republic Pictures ceased production in 1958 and Victor M. Carter became its president in 1959. Carter built Republic into a diversified business with foci outside of the television and film business, and so began leasing its lot to CBS.

In 1963, CBS Television became the primary lessee of the lot. Almost immediately after leasing the Republic Pictures lot, CBS began to locate its network-produced filmed shows there, including Gunsmoke, My Three Sons, and Gilligan's Island. (The Wild Wild West followed in 1965). The Gilligan's Island lagoon was located at the northwestern edge of the lot; it was paved in the mid-1990s to make room for a new parking structure. While under lease, the facility was renamed the CBS Studio Center. The network finally purchased the 70-acre lot outright from Republic in February 1967, for $9.5 million. That same month, Republic also sold its film library. CBS built new sound stages, office buildings, and technical facilities. To make up for these investments, CBS began to rent its studio lot to independent producers, and the newly created MTM Enterprises (headed by actress Mary Tyler Moore and then-husband Grant Tinker) became the Studio Center's primary tenant, beginning in 1970.

Moore's memorable sitcom The Mary Tyler Moore Show began filming here in 1970. Later, its spinoffs Rhoda, Phyllis, and Lou Grant were shot in the facility. In July 1982, CBS formed a partnership with 20th Century Fox to share ownership of the Studio Center, thus once again renaming, this time as CBS/Fox Studios. However, that relationship was short-lived as Fox sold its interest of the Studio Center to MTM, and it became CBS-MTM Studios. In March 1992, the studio once again became CBS Studio Center, when MTM (which was later purchased by 20th Century Fox's parent company, News Corporation) sold its interest in the studio lot to CBS.

From 1991 to 1996, American Gladiators was videotaped at CBS Studio Center. The original "Gladiator Arena" (Stage 3) remains preserved in its original form in its original location, with tours and group events available.

The studio has been one of the most active in the city for producing sitcoms. It is also the base for "Semester in L.A.", a six-week course by Columbia College Chicago.

Since 2007, the Studio Center serves as the home to CBS's Los Angeles flagship TV station KCBS-TV, along with sister station KCAL-TV, as they vacated Columbia Square to move into a newly built, digitally enhanced office and studio facility located where the house for the CBS reality series Big Brother once stood. The CBS Studio City Broadcast Center also houses the Los Angeles bureau of CBS News, which is shared with the KCBS/KCAL local newsroom, and on occasion, the CBS Evening News is anchored from Los Angeles.

In 2008, Entertainment Tonight and The Insider moved from the Paramount backlot to Studio Center, as CBS took ownership of the series after its spin-off from Viacom.

A re-merged ViacomCBS (later Paramount Global and currently known as Paramount Skydance Corporation) announced in 2021 that it intended to sell the facility as part of a corporate effort to focus on content. In November 2021, ViacomCBS announced that the studio would be sold to Hackman Capital Partners and Square Mile Capital Management for $1.85 billion.

In February 2023, The Los Angeles Times reported that the "Radford Studio Center is set to get a $1-billion upgrade to expand its facilities and bring them further into the digital age". Los Angeles officials received a plan from the owners of the lot formerly known as CBS Studio Center to revamp and enlarge the aging studio and broadcasting complex. Deadline Hollywood reported that the upgrades will include "modern soundstages, production and support offices, sustainability measures, historic preservation, and a transportation infrastructure".

In January 2026, Radford Studio Center's owner, Hackman Capital Partners, agreed to relinquish control of the property to its lenders after defaulting on approximately $1.1 billion in debt. The default followed unsuccessful efforts to restructure the loan amid declining production activity, lower occupancy, and rising financing costs affecting Los Angeles studio properties. Goldman Sachs, as the lead lender, eventually repossessed the historic lot. In June 2026, Netflix was under contract to purchase the property but the deadline passed without the sale closing. The property was scheduled for a foreclosure auction on November 24.

=== Backlot ===
Radford Studio Center has three backlot areas. The first is the New York City Street. During the shooting of Seinfeld in the mid-1990s, a New York Street was built to facilitate the filming of exterior shots.

The second area is the Central Park area. The area features grass, trees, paths, and can also be filled with water to create a pond or swamp.

The third area is the Residential Street. Actually made up of two streets, this area features a number of houses which can be used for a variety of productions.

== News tenants ==
- CBS News
- KCBS-TV/KCAL-TV

== Television shows ==
- The $100,000 Pyramid (2022–present)
- 100 Questions
- 106 & Park
- 3rd Rock from the Sun
- 9JKL
- A Different World
- A.P. Bio
- Accidentally on Purpose
- According to Jim
- Alone Together
- America's Got Talent (2007–08)
- America's Got Talent: All-Stars
- American Gladiators (1991–96)
- American Housewife
- Are You Smarter than a 5th Grader? (2007)
- Baby Daddy
- Bad Teacher
- The Bernie Mac Show
- Bet on Your Baby
- Better with You
- Big Brother
- Big Brother: Over the Top
- The Big Valley
- The Bill Engvall Show
- The Bob Newhart Show
- Boston Common
- Boy Meets World
- Brooklyn Nine-Nine
- Cane
- Can't Hurry Love
- Card Sharks (2020–21)
- Caroline in the City
- Celebrity Big Brother
- Celebrity Circus
- The Chase (2021–2023)
- The Class
- The Cleaner
- CSI: Cyber
- CSI: NY
- Colony
- Combat!
- Community
- The Conners
- Criminal Minds: Beyond Borders
- Cybill
- Dave's World
- The Defenders
- Designing Women
- Don't Forget the Lyrics! (2022)
- The Doris Day Show (1969–73)
- Double Dare (2018–19)
- Duets
- The Ellen Show
- Entertainment Tonight (2008–present)
- Evening Shade
- The Exes
- Falcon Crest
- Family Affair
- Family Feud
- Food Network Star (2016)
- The Game
- Gary Unmarried
- Get Smart
- Gilligan's Island
- Girlfriends
- Good Morning, Miami
- Grace Under Fire
- Grandfathered
- Greek
- Greg the Bunny
- Grounded for Life
- Gunsmoke
- Half & Half
- Happily Divorced
- Hearts Afire
- Hill Street Blues
- Hip Hop Squares
- Hole in the Wall (2008–09)
- Hot in Cleveland
- How to Be a Gentleman
- If Not for You
- It's Always Sunny in Philadelphia
- The Insider (2008–17)
- The Jeff Foxworthy Show
- Just Shoot Me!
- The King of Queens
- Kevin from Work
- Kirstie
- The Larry Sanders Show
- Last Man Standing
- Leave It to Beaver
- Less than Perfect
- Lou Grant
- Malcolm in the Middle
- Malibu Country
- Man with a Plan
- The Mary Tyler Moore Show
- Masters of the Maze
- The Mayor
- Melissa & Joey
- The Millers
- Million Dollar Password
- Minute to Win It (2010/Season 1)
- The Moment of Truth
- Mulaney
- My Three Sons
- My Two Dads
- Mystery Girls
- The Naked Truth
- The Neighborhood
- Newhart
- NewsRadio
- The Nine Lives of Chloe King
- The O'Keefes
- On the Lot (Adrianna Costa-hosted shows)
- The Odd Couple (2015)
- Outsourced
- Parks and Recreation
- Passions
- The Paul Reiser Show
- Perfect Couples
- Phyllis
- Planet of the Apps
- Playing House
- Press Your Luck (2021)
- The Pyramid
- Rawhide
- The Real O'Neals
- Remington Steele
- Retired at 35
- Rhoda
- Riot
- Rita Rocks
- Rodney
- Romantically Challenged
- Roommates
- Roseanne (original series & 2018 revival)
- Roundhouse (1993–96)
- Ruby & The Rockits
- Samantha Who?
- The Sarah Silverman Program
- SEAL Team
- Seinfeld
- The Singing Bee
- The Single Guy
- The Soul Man
- Spin City
- St. Elsewhere
- State of Georgia
- Still Standing
- Superior Donuts
- Survivor Finale and reunion shows
- That '70s Show
- That '80s Show
- The Talk (2010–2024)
- Thirtysomething
- Titus
- Tracey Ullman's State of the Union
- Twisted
- Unhappily Ever After
- United States of Tara
- The Virginian
- The Voice
- The White Shadow
- Whitney
- Why Women Kill
- The Wild Wild West
- Will & Grace (1998–2006)
- WKRP in Cincinnati
- Win, Lose or Draw (2014)
- Wisdom of the Crowd
- Yes, Dear
- Young & Hungry

== Theatrical films ==
- The Addams Family
- April Fools
- The Back-up Plan
- Borderline
- Boys on the Side
- Dr. Dolittle
- Dr. Dolittle 2
- Faster
- Father of the Bride
- I Love Trouble
- Jay and Silent Bob Strike Back
- Little Big Man
- Le Mans
- Mr. Wrong
- The Muppet Movie
- Raise the Titanic
- Scream 3
