= The Sentry (California) =

Golf tournament in San Diego, California, United States

Coordinates: 32.903°N 117.245°W

Tournament information
- Location: San Diego, California
- Established: 1952
- Courses: Torrey Pines Golf Course (South Course) (North Course)
- Par: 72
- Length: 7,765 yards (7,100 m) (S); 7,258 yards (6,637 m) (N)
- Organized by: Century Club of San Diego
- Tour: PGA Tour
- Format: Stroke play
- Prize fund: US$9,300,000
- Month played: January/February
- Website: thesentry.com

Tournament record score
- Aggregate: 265 Justin Rose (2026)
- To par: −23 as above

Current champion
- (England) Justin Rose

Location map
- Location in the United States Location in California

The Sentry is an annual professional golf tournament on the PGA Tour, held in San Diego, California. Founded in 1952, the tournament has been held at Torrey Pines Golf Course, a 36-hole municipal facility in La Jolla, since 1968. The tournament is held in the early part of the season known as the "West Coast Swing".

The tournament is organized by the Century Club of San Diego. In the current format, players split the first 36 holes between the North and South Course, then play the final 36 holes on the South Course.

== History ==
Founded in 1952 as the San Diego Open, the first two editions were played at San Diego Country Club in Chula Vista. In 1954, the tournament was played at Rancho Santa Fe Golf Club, which had hosted the Crosby Pro-Am prior to World War II.

Although the San Diego Open began in 1952, the PGA Tour recognizes two earlier events of the same name: Leo Diegel won both events, in December 1927 and January 1929. An autumn event in 1956 and 1957, it was not held in 1958, then returned as a winter event in early 1959.

The event was played at Mission Valley Country Club in 1955, then went to Singing Hills Country Club in El Cajon in October 1956. The tournament returned to Mission Valley C.C. in 1957, where it stayed through 1963. Mission Valley changed its name to Stardust Country Club in 1962 (now Riverwalk Golf Club). After one edition in 1964 at Rancho Bernardo Country Club (now Rancho Bernardo Inn) in San Diego, it returned to Stardust for three years, through 1967.

In 1968, the event began its present relationship with Torrey Pines Golf Course in La Jolla, a 36-hole public facility owned by the City of San Diego. During those early editions at Torrey Pines, the course length was under 6,850 yards (6,265 m). Singer-actor Andy Williams was the celebrity host for the first 21 editions at Torrey Pines, through 1988.

Title sponsors were first added in 1955, with Convair added to the name for two years. In 1981, Wickes was the title sponsor for two years, followed by three with Isuzu. Shearson Lehman Brothers became the title sponsors in 1986, replaced by Buick in 1992 and Farmers Insurance in 2010. In June 2026, it was announced that Sentry Insurance would assume title sponsorship of the tournament, beginning in 2027. The tournament was renamed as The Sentry.

Since 2022 (excluding 2026), the tournament starts on Wednesday and concludes on Saturday, a day prior to the conference championships of the NFL playoffs; the event traditionally marks the beginning of CBS's PGA Tour season.

== Winners ==
| Year | Winner | Score | To par | Margin of victory | Runner(s)-up | Purse ($) | Winner's share ($) |
Farmers Insurance Open
| 2026 | (England) Justin Rose (2) | 265 | −23 | 7 strokes | (United States) Pierceson Coody (Japan) Ryo Hisatsune (South Korea) Kim Si-woo | 9,600,000 | 1,728,000 |
| 2025 | (United States) Harris English | 280 | −8 | 1 stroke | (United States) Sam Stevens | 9,300,000 | 1,674,000 |
| 2024 | (France) Matthieu Pavon | 275 | −13 | 1 stroke | (Denmark) Nicolai Højgaard | 9,000,000 | 1,620,000 |
| 2023 | (United States) Max Homa | 275 | −13 | 2 strokes | (United States) Keegan Bradley | 8,700,000 | 1,566,000 |
| 2022 | (United States) Luke List | 273 | −15 | Playoff | (United States) Will Zalatoris | 8,400,000 | 1,512,000 |
| 2021 | (United States) Patrick Reed | 274 | −14 | 5 strokes | (United States) Tony Finau (Norway) Viktor Hovland (Sweden) Henrik Norlander (United States) Ryan Palmer (United States) Xander Schauffele | 7,500,000 | 1,350,000 |
| 2020 | (Australia) Marc Leishman | 273 | −15 | 1 stroke | (Spain) Jon Rahm | 7,500,000 | 1,350,000 |
| 2019 | (England) Justin Rose | 267 | −21 | 2 strokes | (Australia) Adam Scott | 7,100,000 | 1,278,000 |
| 2018 | (Australia) Jason Day (2) | 278 | −10 | Playoff | (Sweden) Alex Norén (United States) Ryan Palmer | 6,900,000 | 1,242,000 |
| 2017 | (Spain) Jon Rahm | 275 | −13 | 3 strokes | (United States) Charles Howell III (Taiwan) Pan Cheng-tsung | 6,700,000 | 1,206,000 |
| 2016 | (United States) Brandt Snedeker (2) | 282 | −6 | 1 stroke | (South Korea) K. J. Choi | 6,500,000 | 1,170,000 |
| 2015 | (Australia) Jason Day | 279 | −9 | Playoff | (United States) Harris English (United States) J. B. Holmes (United States) Scott Stallings | 6,300,000 | 1,134,000 |
| 2014 | (United States) Scott Stallings | 279 | −9 | 1 stroke | (South Korea) K. J. Choi (Australia) Jason Day (Canada) Graham DeLaet (Australia) Marc Leishman (United States) Pat Perez | 6,100,000 | 1,098,000 |
| 2013 | (United States) Tiger Woods (7) | 274 | −14 | 4 strokes | (United States) Brandt Snedeker (United States) Josh Teater | 6,100,000 | 1,098,000 |
| 2012 | (United States) Brandt Snedeker | 272 | −16 | Playoff | (United States) Kyle Stanley | 6,000,000 | 1,080,000 |
| 2011 | (United States) Bubba Watson | 272 | −16 | 1 stroke | (United States) Phil Mickelson | 5,800,000 | 1,044,000 |
| 2010 | (United States) Ben Crane | 275 | −13 | 1 stroke | (Australia) Marc Leishman (Australia) Michael Sim (United States) Brandt Snedeker | 5,300,000 | 954,000 |
Buick Invitational
| 2009 | (United States) Nick Watney | 277 | −11 | 1 stroke | (United States) John Rollins | 5,300,000 | 954,000 |
| 2008 | (United States) Tiger Woods (6) | 269 | −19 | 8 strokes | (Japan) Ryuji Imada | 5,200,000 | 936,000 |
| 2007 | (United States) Tiger Woods (5) | 273 | −15 | 2 strokes | (United States) Charles Howell III | 5,200,000 | 936,000 |
| 2006 | (United States) Tiger Woods (4) | 278 | −10 | Playoff | (Australia) Nathan Green (Spain) José María Olazábal | 5,100,000 | 918,000 |
| 2005 | (United States) Tiger Woods (3) | 272 | −16 | 3 strokes | (England) Luke Donald (United States) Charles Howell III (United States) Tom Lehman | 4,800,000 | 864,000 |
| 2004 | (United States) John Daly | 278 | −10 | Playoff | (England) Luke Donald (United States) Chris Riley | 4,800,000 | 864,000 |
| 2003 | (United States) Tiger Woods (2) | 272 | −16 | 4 strokes | (Sweden) Carl Pettersson | 4,500,000 | 810,000 |
| 2002 | (Spain) José María Olazábal | 275 | −13 | 1 stroke | (United States) J. L. Lewis (United States) Mark O'Meara | 3,600,000 | 648,000 |
| 2001 | (United States) Phil Mickelson (3) | 269 | −19 | Playoff | (United States) Frank Lickliter (United States) Davis Love III | 3,500,000 | 630,000 |
| 2000 | (United States) Phil Mickelson (2) | 270 | −18 | 4 strokes | (Japan) Shigeki Maruyama (United States) Tiger Woods | 3,000,000 | 540,000 |
| 1999 | (United States) Tiger Woods | 266 | −22 | 2 strokes | (United States) Billy Ray Brown | 2,700,000 | 486,000 |
| 1998 | (United States) Scott Simpson | 204 (Note: Shortened to 54 holes due to rain.) | −12 | Playoff | (United States) Skip Kendall | 2,100,000 | 378,000 |
| 1997 | (United States) Mark O'Meara | 275 | −13 | 2 strokes | (United States) Donnie Hammond (United States) Mike Hulbert (United States) Lee Janzen (United States) David Ogrin (Sweden) Jesper Parnevik (United States) Craig Stadler (United States) Duffy Waldorf | 1,500,000 | 270,000 |
| 1996 | (United States) Davis Love III | 269 | −19 | 2 strokes | (United States) Phil Mickelson | 1,200,000 | 216,000 |
Buick Invitational of California
| 1995 | (United States) Peter Jacobsen | 269 | −19 | 4 strokes | (United States) Mark Calcavecchia (United States) Mike Hulbert (United States) Hal Sutton (United States) Kirk Triplett | 1,200,000 | 216,000 |
| 1994 | (United States) Craig Stadler | 268 | −20 | 1 stroke | (United States) Steve Lowery | 1,100,000 | 198,000 |
| 1993 | (United States) Phil Mickelson | 278 | −10 | 4 strokes | (United States) Dave Rummells | 1,000,000 | 180,000 |
| 1992 | (United States) Steve Pate (2) | 200 | −16 | 1 stroke | (United States) Chip Beck | 1,000,000 | 180,000 |
Shearson Lehman Brothers Open
| 1991 | (United States) Jay Don Blake | 268 | −20 | 2 strokes | (United States) Bill Sander | 1,000,000 | 180,000 |
Shearson Lehman Hutton Open
| 1990 | (United States) Dan Forsman | 275 | −13 | 2 strokes | (United States) Tommy Armour III | 900,000 | 162,000 |
| 1989 | (United States) Greg Twiggs | 271 | −17 | 2 strokes | (Australia) Steve Elkington (United States) Brad Faxon (United States) Mark O'Meara (United States) Mark Wiebe | 700,000 | 126,000 |
Shearson Lehman Hutton Andy Williams Open
| 1988 | (United States) Steve Pate | 269 | −19 | 1 stroke | (United States) Jay Haas | 650,000 | 117,000 |
Shearson Lehman Brothers Andy Williams Open
| 1987 | (United States) George Burns | 266 | −22 | 4 strokes | (United States) J. C. Snead (United States) Bobby Wadkins | 500,000 | 90,000 |
| 1986 | (United States) Bob Tway | 204 | −12 | Playoff | (West Germany) Bernhard Langer | 450,000 | 81,000 |
Isuzu-Andy Williams San Diego Open
| 1985 | (United States) Woody Blackburn | 269 | −19 | Playoff | (United States) Ron Streck | 400,000 | 72,000 |
| 1984 | (United States) Gary Koch | 272 | −16 | Playoff | (United States) Gary Hallberg | 400,000 | 72,000 |
| 1983 | (United States) Gary Hallberg | 271 | −17 | 1 stroke | (United States) Tom Kite | 300,000 | 54,000 |
Wickes-Andy Williams San Diego Open
| 1982 | (United States) Johnny Miller | 270 | −18 | 1 stroke | (United States) Jack Nicklaus | 300,000 | 54,000 |
| 1981 | (United States) Bruce Lietzke | 278 | −10 | Playoff | (United States) Raymond Floyd (United States) Tom Jenkins | 250,000 | 45,000 |
Andy Williams-San Diego Open Invitational
| 1980 | (United States) Tom Watson (2) | 275 | −13 | Playoff | (United States) D. A. Weibring | 250,000 | 45,000 |
| 1979 | (United States) Fuzzy Zoeller | 282 | −6 | 5 strokes | (United States) Billy Kratzert (United States) Wayne Levi (United States) Artie McNickle (United States) Tom Watson | 250,000 | 45,000 |
| 1978 | (United States) Jay Haas | 278 | −10 | 3 strokes | (United States) Andy Bean (United States) Gene Littler (United States) John Schroeder | 200,000 | 40,000 |
| 1977 | (United States) Tom Watson | 269 | −19 | 5 strokes | (United States) Larry Nelson (United States) John Schroeder | 180,000 | 36,000 |
| 1976 | (United States) J. C. Snead (2) | 272 | −16 | 1 stroke | (United States) Don Bies | 180,000 | 36,000 |
| 1975 | (United States) J. C. Snead | 279 | −9 | Playoff | (United States) Raymond Floyd (United States) Bobby Nichols | 170,000 | 34,000 |
| 1974 | (United States) Bobby Nichols | 275 | −13 | 1 stroke | (United States) Rod Curl (United States) Gene Littler | 170,000 | 34,000 |
| 1973 | (United States) Bob Dickson | 278 | −10 | 1 stroke | (United States) Billy Casper (Australia) Bruce Crampton (United States) Grier Jones (United States) Phil Rodgers | 170,000 | 34,000 |
| 1972 | (United States) Paul Harney | 275 | −13 | 1 stroke | (United States) Hale Irwin | 150,000 | 30,000 |
| 1971 | (United States) George Archer | 272 | −16 | 3 strokes | (United States) Dave Eichelberger | 150,000 | 30,000 |
| 1970 | (United States) Pete Brown | 275 | −13 | Playoff | (England) Tony Jacklin | 150,000 | 30,000 |
| 1969 | (United States) Jack Nicklaus | 284 | −4 | 1 stroke | (United States) Gene Littler | 150,000 | 30,000 |
| 1968 | (United States) Tom Weiskopf | 273 | −15 | 1 stroke | (United States) Al Geiberger | 150,000 | 30,000 |
San Diego Open Invitational
| 1967 | (United States) Bob Goalby | 269 | −15 | 1 stroke | (United States) Gay Brewer | 71,000 | 13,200 |
| 1966 | (United States) Billy Casper | 268 | −16 | 4 strokes | (United States) Tommy Aaron (United States) Tom Weiskopf | 45,000 | 5,800 |
| 1965 | (United States) Wes Ellis | 267 | −17 | Playoff | (United States) Billy Casper | 39,000 | 4,850 |
| 1964 | (United States) Art Wall Jr. | 274 | −6 | 2 strokes | (United States) Tony Lema (United States) Bob Rosburg | 30,000 | 4,300 |
| 1963 | (South Africa) Gary Player | 270 | −14 | 1 stroke | (United States) Tony Lema | 25,000 | 3,500 |
| 1962 | (United States) Tommy Jacobs | 277 | −7 | Playoff | (United States) Johnny Pott | 25,000 | 3,500 |
| 1961 | (United States) Arnold Palmer (2) | 271 | −13 | 1 stroke | (Canada) Al Balding | 22,500 | 2,800 |
| 1960 | (United States) Mike Souchak | 269 | −19 | 1 stroke | (United States) Johnny Pott | 22,500 | 2,800 |
| 1959 | (United States) Marty Furgol | 274 | −14 | 1 stroke | (United States) Joe Campbell (United States) Billy Casper (United States) Dave Ragan (United States) Mike Souchak (United States) Bo Wininger | 20,000 | 2,800 |
1958: No tournament
| 1957 | (United States) Arnold Palmer | 271 | −17 | 1 stroke | (Canada) Al Balding | 15,000 | 2,400 |
Convair-San Diego Open
| 1956 | (United States) Bob Rosburg | 270 | −18 | 2 strokes | (United States) Dick Mayer | 15,000 | 2,400 |
| 1955 | (United States) Tommy Bolt (2) | 274 | −14 | 2 strokes | (United States) Johnny Palmer | 15,000 | 2,400 |
San Diego Open
| 1954 | (United States) Gene Littler (a) | 274 | −14 | 4 strokes | (United States) Dutch Harrison | 15,000 | 2,400 |
| 1953 | (United States) Tommy Bolt | 274 | −14 | 3 strokes | (United States) Doug Ford | 10,000 | 2,000 |
| 1952 | (United States) Ted Kroll | 276 | −12 | 3 strokes | (United States) Jimmy Demaret | 10,000 | 2,000 |

Note: Green highlight indicates scoring records.

== Records and milestones ==
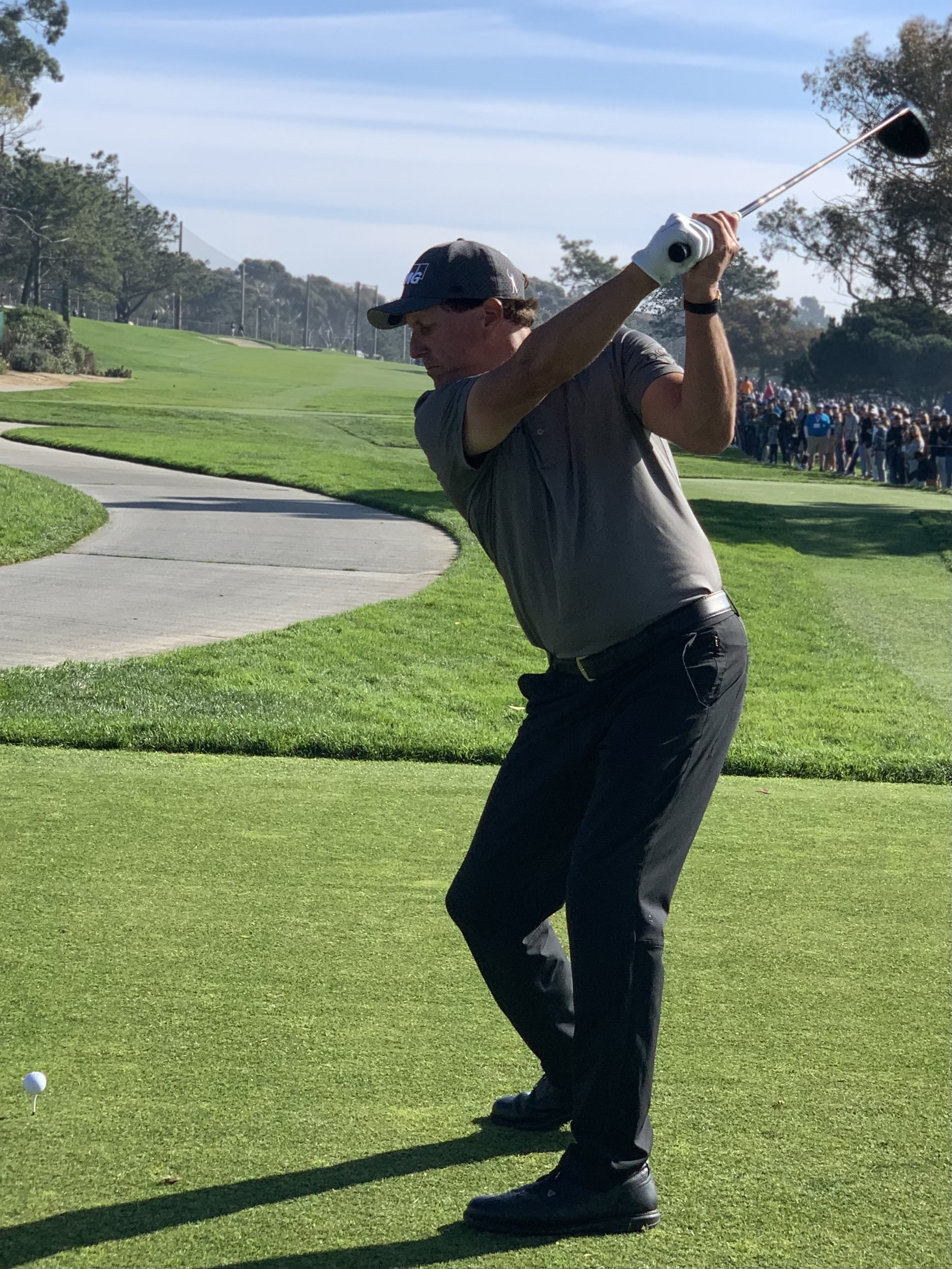
- Phil Mickelson at the 2020 tournament, the Farmers Open
  Tournament course record:
  - Torrey Pines, North Course - 61, Mark Brooks, 1990, and Brandt Snedeker, 2007;
  - Torrey Pines, South Course - 62, Tiger Woods, 1999
- Tiger Woods is the only seven-time winner of the tournament, and Phil Mickelson the only other to win more than twice.
- Hall of Famer and San Diego native Gene Littler is the only amateur winner, achieving the feat in 1954, and awarded a five-piece tea set. Subsequently, as a professional, Littler was a runner-up three times (1969, 1974, 1978).
- A memorable year in the tournament's history was 1982, when Johnny Miller outdueled Jack Nicklaus to win by one stroke.
- Tiger Woods (2005–08) won four straight years, then won his fifth consecutive Torrey Pines tournament at the 2008 U.S. Open on the South Course that June.
  - J. C. Snead (1975–76) and Phil Mickelson (2000–01) won in consecutive years.
- Heavyweight boxer Joe Louis was invited to play in the San Diego Open in 1952 on a sponsor's exemption;
  - Louis became the first African American ever to play in this PGA Tour event.
