= The Century Club of San Diego =

The Century Club of San Diego is a San Diego–based charitable organization, established in July 1961. They are the organizers of The Sentry, an annual PGA Tour golf tournament at Torrey Pines Golf Course, solely for charitable purposes. The proceeds of The Sentry often go to Monarch School, although in 2011 they reported to have donated over $1.3 million to over 200 charities. The Century Club are also major fundraisers of the San Diego County Junior Golf Association, investing in San Diego golf education.

The club has its origins in the organizers of the San Diego Open who were looking to broaden their support base beyond corporate sponsors San Diego County Chevrolet Dealers Association and Convair. Wickes Furniture and Andy Williams collaborated and established the Wicks/Andy Williams San Diego Open in late 1967-early 1968. In 1983, Isuzu and Williams began sponsoring the tournament and from 1986 to 1991, Shearson Lehman Brothers were the sponsors. In 1992, Buick Motor Division became the official sponsor of the tournament until 2009 when Farmers Insurance Group became its official sponsor. As of November 2011, The Century Club of San Diego has 56 active members, 9 provisional members, 8 associate members and 28 honorary members.
