= Sanford C. Sigoloff =

American businessman and philanthropist (1930 –2011)

- Born: September 8, 1930; St. Louis, Missouri, U.S.
- Died: February 19, 2011 (aged 80); Los Angeles, California, U.S.
- Education: Beverly Hills High School
- Alma mater: University of California, Los Angeles
- Occupations: Businessman, philanthropist
- Spouse: Betty Sigoloff (m. 1952)
- Children: 2 sons, 1 daughter

Sanford C. Sigoloff (September 8, 1930 – February 19, 2011) was an American businessman and philanthropist. He became known as "Mr. Chapter 11" for his rescuing of a number of companies from bankruptcy, in the course of which he pioneered an investor-friendly "slash-and-burn strategy" at the expense of employees. He supported charitable causes and the UCLA Anderson School of Management, where he is the namesake of an endowed chair.

== Early life ==
Sanford C. Sigoloff was born on September 8, 1930, in St. Louis, Missouri. His father served as a physician in the United States Army during World War II.

Sigoloff was educated at the Beverly Hills High School in Beverly Hills, California. He graduated from the University of California, Los Angeles (UCLA), where he earned a Bachelor of Science in physics and biology in 1951.

== Career ==
Sigoloff began his career by working for the United States Atomic Energy Commission. During the Korean War, he worked as a researcher for the United States Air Force. From 1963 to 1969, he worked for the Xerox subsidiary, Electro-Optical Systems in Pasadena, California.

Sigoloff turned around Republic Corporation and Daylin, Inc. from bankruptcy in the 1970s. Sigoloff joined Republic as senior vice president in October 1970. He was promoted to president and chief operating officer in December 1970 and elected chief executive officer succeeding Gerald B. Block.

In the course of his restructuring of Daylin, Sigoloff's sought to fire more than half of Daylin's 16,000 employees, including Arthur Blank and Bernard Marcus, who went on to found The Home Depot.

In March 1982, Sigoloff took over as the chief executive of the Wickes Companies, the parent company of retailers Builders Emporium, Wickes Furniture, Red Owl Supermarkets and Snyder Drug Stores, when the company was facing bankruptcy. In this capacity, he appeared in commercials on national television, as a spokesman for Wickes' Builders Emporium. He also led the $1 billion acquisition of the consumer and industrial products division of Gulf and Western Industries. Once again, Sigoloff rescued the company. However, when Sigoloff tried to rescue LJ Hooker, it proved impossible. Nevertheless, Sigoloff became known as "Mr. Chapter 11."

== Philanthropy ==
Sigoloff made charitable contributions to the Cedars-Sinai Medical Center, the City of Hope National Medical Center, the Center Theatre Group, the American Jewish Committee, and the United States Holocaust Memorial Museum.

Sigoloff served on the board of visitors of the UCLA Anderson School of Management from 1984 to 2002. He is the namesake of the Sanford and Betty Sigoloff Chair in Corporate Renewal, held by Professor William G. Ouchi.

== Personal life and death ==
Sigoloff married his wife, Betty, in 1952. They had two sons, John and Stephen, and a daughter, Laurie. They resided in Brentwood, Los Angeles. He collected Porsches.

Sigoloff died of pneumonia on February 19, 2011. He had suffered from Alzheimer's disease. His funeral was held at the Wilshire Boulevard Temple.

On his death, Professor Edward Altman of the New York University Stern School of Business said Sigoloff "was considered one of the pioneers of the slash-and-burn strategy that resonated with creditors," but he added that "it was controversial because people felt that there was too much carnage in terms of quick dismissals."
