= Gamble-Skogmo =

American retail company

Gamble-Skogmo, Inc
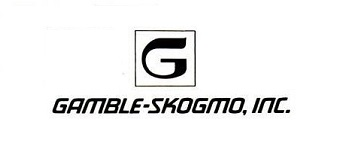
- Type: Subsidiary
- Industry: Retail
- Founded: 1920
- Founders: Bertin Gamble and Philip Skogmo
- Defunct: December 31, 1984; 41 years ago
- Headquarters: Minneapolis, Minnesota, U.S.
- Areas served: United States and Canada
- Products: Clothing, footwear, accessories, bedding, furniture, jewelry, beauty products, and housewares

Gamble-Skogmo Inc. was an American conglomerate of retail chains and other businesses that was headquartered in St. Louis Park, Minnesota. Business operated or franchised by Gamble-Skogmo included Gambles hardware and auto supply stores, Woman's World and Mode O'Day clothing stores, J.M. McDonald department stores, Leath Furniture stores, Tempo and Buckeye Mart Discount Stores, Howard's Brandiscount Department Stores, Rasco Variety Stores, Sarco Outlet Stores, Toy World, Rasco-Tempo, Red Owl Grocery, Snyder Drug and the Aldens mail-order company. In Canada, retail operations consisted of Macleods Hardware, based in Winnipeg, Manitoba, and Stedmans Department Stores, based in Toronto, Ontario. Gamble-Skogmo carried a line of home appliances, including radios, televisions, refrigerators, and freezers, under the Coronado brand name.

== History ==
Gambles logo, circa 1960s

Born at the end of the 19th century, Bertin Gamble and Philip Skogmo were boyhood friends in Arthur, North Dakota (30 miles northwest of Fargo). As young men, they each came separately to Minnesota and worked in a variety of jobs. In 1920, they pooled their resources, borrowed some money and purchased the Hudson-Essex automobile agency in Fergus Falls, Minnesota, which they sold in 1921 after acquiring both the Ford and Dodge agencies in that city. Soon they discovered the sale of auto parts and accessories was the most profitable part of their car dealerships. In March 1925, they opened the first Gamble Auto Supply store in St. Cloud, Minnesota. In 1928, they moved their headquarters to Minneapolis. By 1929, the chain consisted of 55 stores in five states. Eventually, Gamble stores were franchised, and by 1939 there were 1,500 Gamble dealers and 300 corporate stores in 24 states. In 1947, Gamble-Skogmo went public with its first offering of common stock. Philip Skogmo died in 1949.

The original Gambles store in St. Cloud (1925) was so successful that four more stores opened in the Dakotas within ten weeks. The partners decided to incorporate Gamble-Skogmo, Incorporated in 1928, and shortly thereafter moved the headquarters and central warehousing to Minneapolis. By the end of the year there were 55 Gambles retail outlets in five states. By 1933 they had added 100 more outlets and grown annual corporate sales to $10 million. Franchised dealerships were inaugurated in 1933 and, in 1941, clothing and other "softlines" were added to the staple "hardlines" business, a diversification made necessary by the unavailability of consumer hard goods during World War II.

The corporation went international in 1945 with the acquisition of the 270 Macleod hardlines retail outlets in Western Canada. Gamble-Skogmo went public in 1947, and partner Phil Skogmo died in 1949. The company expanded into mass merchandising by forming its Tempo Stores division in 1962, which grew into a chain of 50 discount shopping centers. The following year saw the acquisition of the 286-store Stedmans chain, which operated throughout Canada. In 1964 Gamble-Skogmo entered the catalog merchandising field by acquiring the large Aldens operation, including its life insurance subsidiary. In 1966 Founder's, Incorporated was merged into the corporation, bringing it a women's wear chain (Mode O'Day), and a group of variety stores including Cussins & Fearn and Rasco stores, and Buckeye Mart Discount Department Stores. In the same year the corporation also acquired the House of Fabrics chain and formed Gambles Import Corporation to direct the purchase of goods made overseas. In 1967 Gamble-Skogmo formed a real estate subsidiary, Gamble Development Company, to develop and lease shopping centers, and also acquired the 400-store Red Owl supermarket chain, which also included 62 Snyder's drug stores. Between 1969 and 1972 the corporation several leasing business lines, launched Gambles home improvement centers, and acquired the 24-store Woman's World clothing chain.

From the mid-1940s to the end of the 1970s, Gamble and Skogmo diversified their businesses into many new endeavors, including a discount division, financial services, real estate, and retail businesses such as Aldens mail order company, Woman's World Shops, Red Owl Grocery and Snyder Drug stores. At the end of this period of growth, Gamble-Skogmo was the 15th largest retailer in the United States with 4,300 stores and 26,000 employees in 39 states and Canada. In 1977, Bert Gamble retired from the company. In 1978, they attempted a takeover of Washington, D.C.–based retail conglomerate Garfinckel, Brooks Brothers, Miller & Rhoads, Inc. Gamble-Skogmo purchased a 20-percent share from the Joseph R. Harris family, thereby gaining a controlling interest in the conglomerate. A court suit resulted in an agreement that Gamble-Skogmo would not acquire any more stock in Garfinckel.

Gamble served as president and chief executive officer of Gamble-Skogmo, Incorporated, the umbrella firm that controlled the myriad operating companies, into 1963. He continued to serve as chairman of the board of directors and corporate CEO until retiring in September 1977.

In 1980, it was sold to the Wickes Companies of California. The purchase was highly leveraged, the combined companies struggled, and in 1982 Wickes filed for bankruptcy. In the subsequent reorganization, the Gamble-Skogmo empire was sold off in pieces or, in the case of Aldens, closed. In 1986, Bert Gamble died. Following the Wickes' entry into receivership in 1984, the remaining Gamble-Skogmo businesses were returned to a new company formed by five Gambles Division officers, who reincorporated Gamble-Skogmo, Incorporated. The sale to Wickes was highly leveraged, ultimately leading to a filing of bankruptcy and scattered sales of parts of the enterprise to others.

== Divisions ==
=== Aldens ===
Aldens was established in 1889 under the name Chicago Mail Order and Millinery Company and was incorporated in Illinois on December 15, 1902. In 1906 the name of the business changed to Chicago Mail Order Company. In the mid-1930s Aldens expanded its operations through acquisitions. It acquired the goodwill and mailing lists of M.W. Savage Company of Minneapolis in April 1935, Hamilton Garment of New York in May 1936, and D.T. Bohon of Kentucky in June 1936.

In 1946 the company changed its name to Aldens, Inc., and was the fourth-largest mail-order distributor in the United States. Gamble-Skogmo acquired a 46% interest in Aldens, and acquired the remaining stock in the company in 1964. The catalog operation was liquidated in 1985.

Beginning in 1961 the company began offering life insurance for sale through its catalog, operated by its wholly owned subsidiary, John Alden Life Insurance Company.

=== Cussins & Fearn Company ===
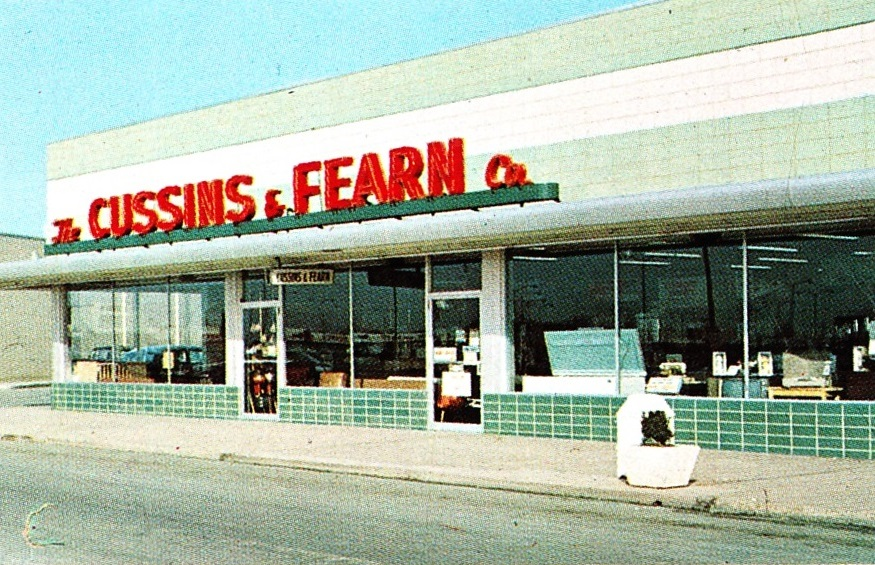
Cussins & Fearn Co., Northern Lights Shopping Center, Columbus, Ohio

The Cussins & Fearn Company was a chain of stores that sold a wide variety of items including hardware, housewares, plumbing and heating, automotive, appliances, farm supplies, furniture and many other hardlines products. The store format was similar to that of Gambles Stores. The company was founded in 1893 by Charles D. Cussins and William A. Fearn. By 1947, the chain had 30 stores and 44 stores at its peak, all of which were company owned and located in Ohio. Cussins & Fearn was purchased by Founders, Inc., a Gamble-Skogmo-affiliated holding company, in 1960. All Cussins and Fearn Stores were phased out by the early 1970s due to the success of Cussins & Fearn's Buckeye Mart discount department stores.

=== Discount Department Stores ===
Gamble-Skogmo operated discount department stores under various nameplates throughout the United States. Gamble-Skogmo operated Rasco-Tempo discount department stores in Western states (operated by the Rasco Variety Stores Division), Tempo Discount Department Stores in Midwestern and Great Plains states (e.g., Tempo Department Store, then a part of Gambles Store network. Menominee, Michigan (1967–1975)) and Buckeye Mart stores in Ohio (operated by the Cussins & Fearn Co. Division). The Tempo and Buckeye Mart divisions were later merged to become the Tempo-Buckeye Stores division based in Minneapolis and Columbus, Ohio. Tempo and Buckeye Mart stores in Ohio and Michigan were sold to Fisher's Big Wheel in the late 1970s, with the remaining Tempo stores transferred to the F. S. Rasco & Co. variety store division. The remaining Tempo stores were closed in the early 1980s following the bankruptcy of parent company Wickes.

Gamble-Skogmo also owned a 51% interest in Clark's Gamble Corporation, which operated Clark's Discount Department Stores in the United States and Canada. In 1968, Clark's-Gamble Corporation and its stores in the United States were purchased by discount store operator Cook United, Inc., based in Cleveland, Ohio. Gambles retained ownership of Clark's-Gamble of Canada Limited, the operating unit for four Clark's stores in Canada.

In 1978, Gamble-Skogmo purchased the Howard Brothers Discount Stores chain, also known as Howards' Brandiscount, based in Monroe, Louisiana.

Gambles Discount Department Stores
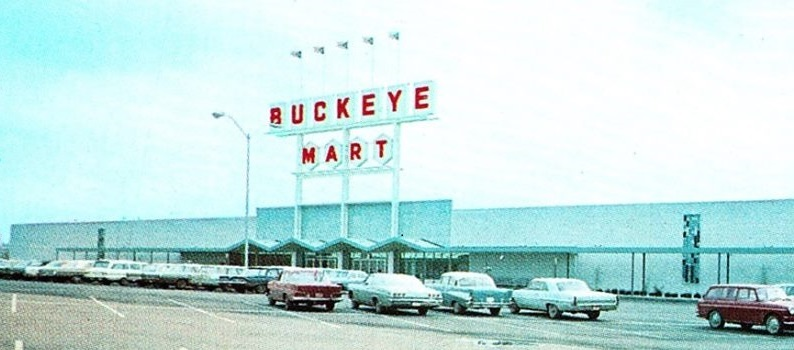
Buckeye Mart - Berwick Plaza Shopping Center, 2837 Winchester Pike, Columbus, Ohio (open 1965-1976; location of first Big Lots store)

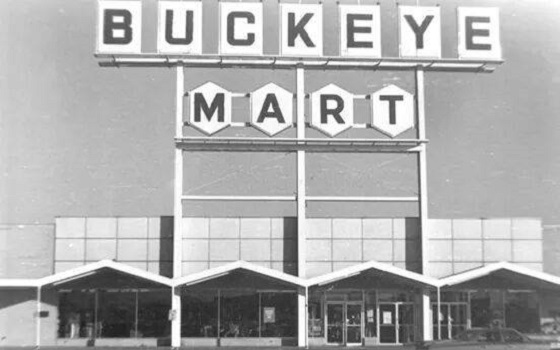
Buckeye Mart - Park Ridge Shopping Center, 1726 West High St., Piqua, Ohio

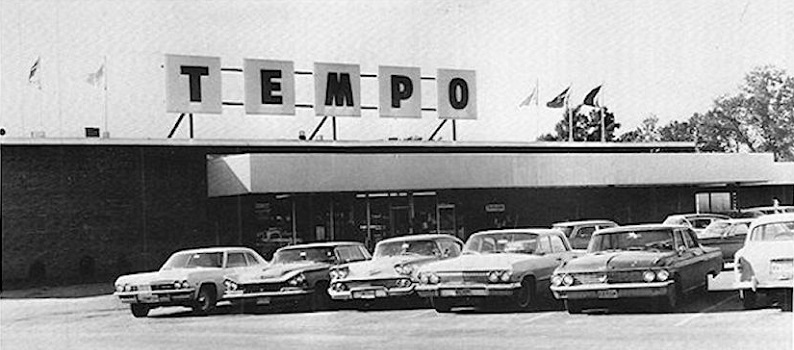
Tempo - Westmore Plaza Shopping Center, Marion, Illinois

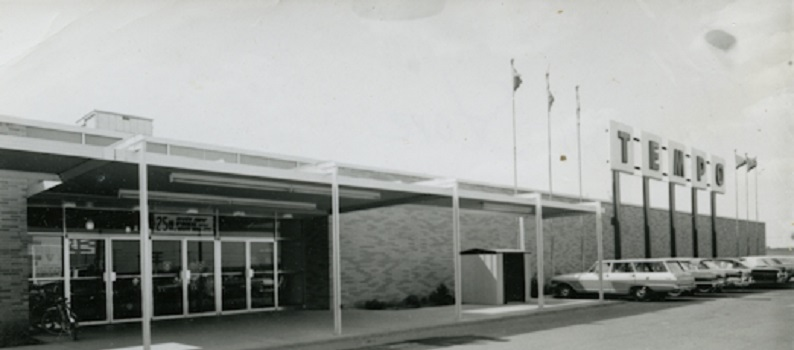
Tempo - 1107 3rd Avenue, Dickinson, North Dakota (open 1964-1981)

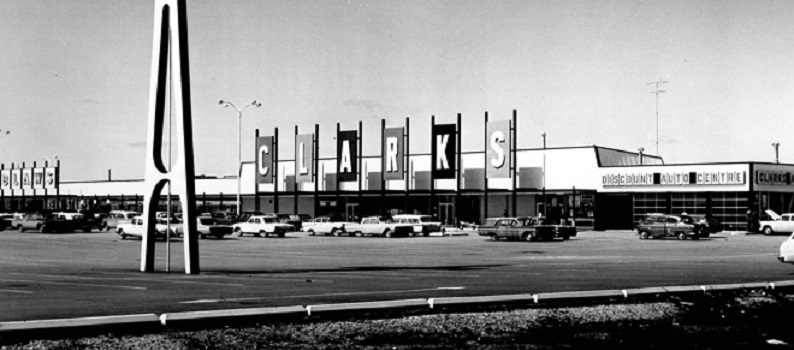
Clark's - Grant Park Shopping Centre, Winnipeg, Manitoba, Canada

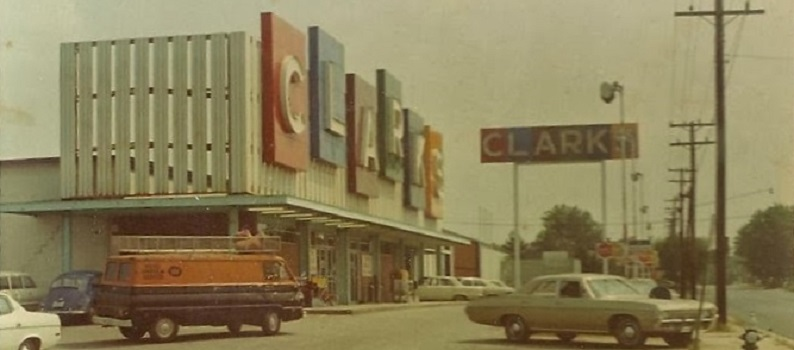
Clark's - 4201 Burlington Road, Greensboro, North Carolina (open 1958 - 1977)

=== F. S. Rasco & Company ===
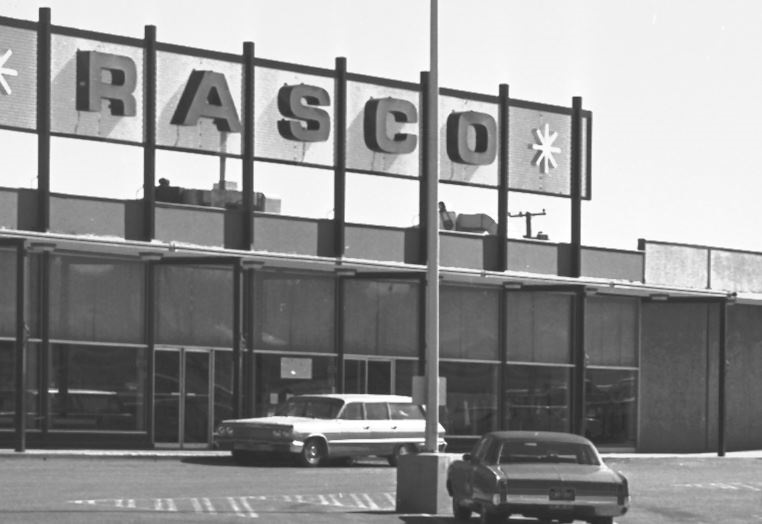
Rasco Variety Store, Boulder Highway, Henderson, Nevada

F. S. Rasco & Co. was a chain of 120 franchised variety stores named for the company's founder, Ferron S. Rasco. The Rasco division was headquartered in Burbank, California and its stores were located primarily in California, Nevada, Arizona and New Mexico. The Rasco Division also operated Tempo and Rasco-Tempo discount department stores, Toy World toy stores and Sarco Outlet Stores. (Sarco was an inversion of the letters "R" and "S" in Rasco.) The Rasco division was purchased by Founders, Inc., a Gamble-Skogmo-affiliated holding company, in 1951 and closed in the early 1980s.

=== Gambles Department Stores ===
Aldens also operated various department stores in various cities which later became known as the Gamble Department Stores division. At one time, Gambles owned 25 local department stores including the following:

- Alden's, Kankakee, Illinois
- Alden's-Herz (formerly Adolph Herz Store), Terre Haute, Indiana
- Dillard's, Texarkana, Arkansas and Magnolia, Arkansas
- B. Peck & Co., Lewiston, Maine
- Breeden's, Bloomington, Indiana
- The Capitol, Sumter, South Carolina
- Gregg's, Lima, Ohio
- J.M. McDonald, a 90-unit chain headquartered in Hastings, Nebraska
- McAtee, Owensboro, Kentucky
- Palace, Monroe, Louisiana
- Paris Company, Salt Lake City, Utah
- Pushins, Bowling Green, Kentucky
- Robertson's, South Bend, Indiana,
- Roshek Brothers Department Store, Dubuque, Iowa
Gambles Department Stores
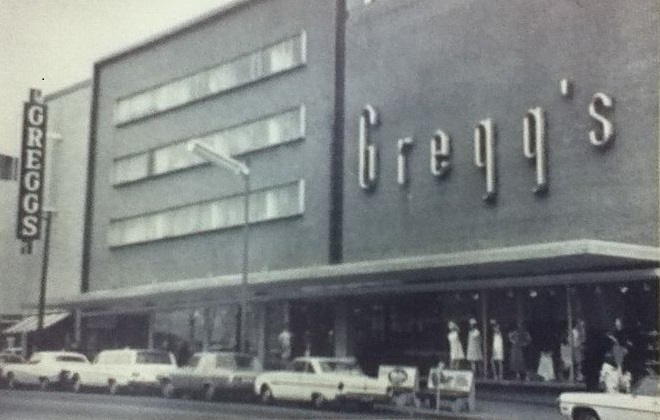
Gregg's - Lima, Ohio

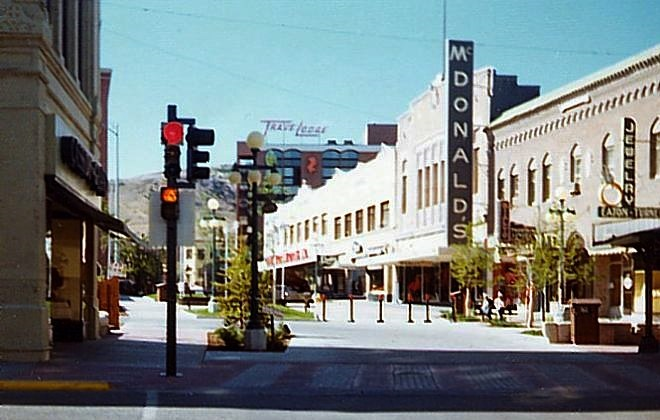
J.M. McDonald Co. - Helena, Montana

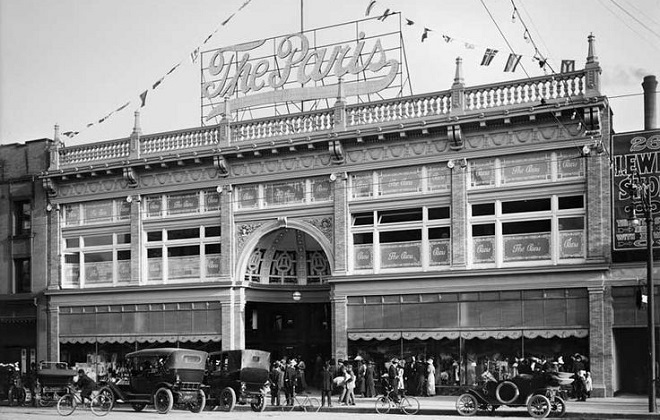
The Paris Co. - Salt Lake City, Utah

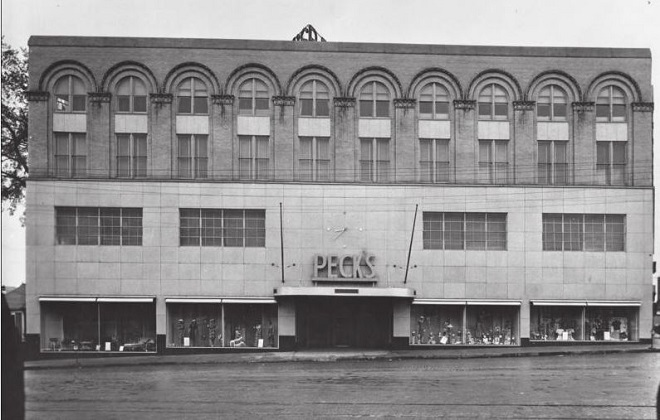
B. Peck & Co. - Lewiston, Maine

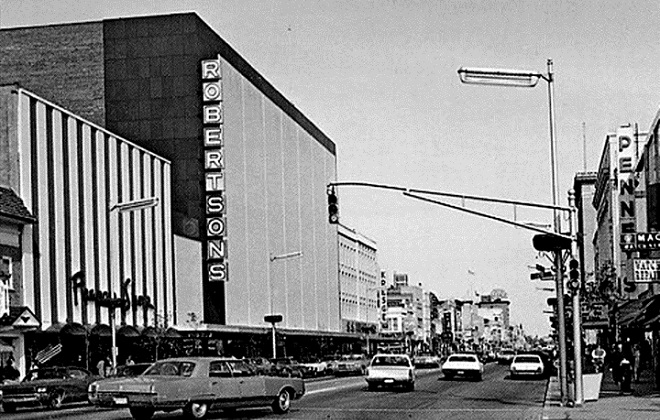
Robertson's - South Bend, Indiana

=== Mode O'Day ===
Mode O'Day was a women's clothing chain headquartered in Burbank, California. The company was founded in Glendale, California in 1932 by Ernest, Billy and Bert Malouf, three brothers who were immigrants from Lebanon, with the idea of manufacturing dresses and selling them from their own stores. By the mid-1960s and as recently as 1982, there were over 800 stores in over 30 states, with most stores being franchised, and seven factories. The company was purchased by Gamble-Skogmo Inc. in 1961. The company was rebranded to "Fashion Crossroads" in the 1980s in an attempt to update the stores' image. One franchisee bought out its franchise contract and continues to operate a store in Casper, Wyoming.

=== Red Owl Supermarkets ===
Grocery wholesaler Supervalu Inc. obtained the rights to the Red Owl name in 1988. As of 2009, there are two Red Owl Grocery stores: Masons Red Owl in Green Bay, Wisconsin and Brownlow's Red Owl in Le Roy, Minnesota.

=== Woman's World Shops ===
Woman's World Shops was a chain of retail stores specializing in clothing for large women. The chain was a subsidiary at the time Wickes Companies purchased Gamble-Skogmo. In 1986, Wickes sold the chain to Dutch retailer Amcena Corporation, which was controlled by the secretive Brenninkmeijer family. Amcena, a closely held retailing company, then owned several other retailing lines, including Millers Outpost, Maurices, Uptons and Howland Steinbach. In 1994, Amcena changed its name to American Retail Group Inc. Maurices was acquired by Dress Barn, Inc. and the corporate name was changed to Ascena, Inc.

== Coronado brand appliances and electronics ==
Gamble-Skogmo marketed appliances, televisions and electronics under its Coronado private-label brand. Coronado-branded products were made by various companies that specialized in private label manufacturing such as Wells-Gardner, Belmont, Warwick, Detrola, Colonial, Arvin and Kingston Radio Corp. beginning in the 1930s. These companies also manufactured private label electronics for other retailers such as Sears (Silvertone), Western Auto (Truetone), and Montgomery Ward (Airline). It was not uncommon to see practically identical versions of Coronado-branded goods sold by competing retailers under the Silvertone, Truetone and Airline brand names.

== Hiawatha brand bicycles ==
Hiawatha brand bicycles were sold by Gambles Hardware stores from the 1930s through the 1970s. Most Hiawatha bicycles were manufactured by the Cleveland Welding Company or the Shelby Cycle Company, however some were made by Murray Ohio and Huffman Manufacturing.
