= Aldens (department store) =

- Type: Private
- Industry: catalog merchant
- Founded: 1889
- Founder: Benjamin J. Rosenthal
- Defunct: 1985
- Fate: Liquidation
- Headquarters: Chicago, Illinois

Aldens was an American catalog merchant company.

== History ==
Aldens was founded by Benjamin J. Rosenthal in 1889 in Chicago under the name Chicago Mail Order and Millinery Company and was incorporated on December 15, 1902. The company primarily sold fashion apparel and accessories for women and men via its catalog.

In 1906, the name was changed to Chicago Mail Order Company.

In the 1930s, the company expanded through acquisitions: in 1935, it purchased the mailing lists of M.W. Savage Company of Minneapolis; and in 1936, those of Hamilton Garment of New York and D.T. Bohon of Kentucky. Soon after, Chicago Mail Order Company began offering a monthly payment plan to its customers, essentially granting credit, and expanded its line to include books, toys, and linens.

In 1938, they expanded to include home furnishings and housewares, and sales increased to $24 million.

In 1943, they built a large distribution warehouse in Chicago with 690,000 square feet of floor space.

In 1944, they began to develop a retail network primarily in the Midwest (which eventually expanded to 16 stores by 1959).

In 1947, the company was the fourth-largest mail-order distributor in the United States with $79.2 million in sales and changed its name to Aldens, Inc. In 1957, sales were $102.4 million, they had 4,795 employees, and operated catalog telephone stores in 68 cities.

In 1961, they began selling life insurance via their subsidiary, the John Alden Life Insurance Company. In 1964, Gamble-Skogmo (which had previously purchased a 46% interest in Aldens), purchased the remaining stock in the company including the life insurance unit. The catalog operation was liquidated in 1985 as part of bankruptcy proceedings for Wickes Companies, which had purchased Gamble-Skogmo in 1980.
