= Builders Emporium =

Home improvement store chain based in Irvine, California

- Type: Subsidiary
- Industry: Home improvement centers
- Founded: 1946; 80 years ago in Van Nuys, California
- Founder: Si L. Bercutt
- Defunct: 1993; 33 years ago
- Fate: Insolvency
- Headquarters: Irvine, California, U.S.
- Number of locations: 96 (1993)
- Areas served: California, Nevada, New Mexico, Arizona, Texas
- Products: Hardware, lumber
- Parent: Food Giant (1962–1967); Two Guys (1967–1978); Wickes Companies (1978–1993)

Builders Emporium was a chain of home improvement stores based in Irvine, California, United States. At the time of its closing in 1993, it had 82 stores in Southern California and an additional 15 in Nevada, New Mexico, Arizona and Texas; 4,300 employees in total.

The chain had a fictional human character, "Pops" Larsen that, in brochures and other media, was portrayed as helping customers with do-it-yourself tasks such as hanging a door.

== History ==
The Builders Emporium chain was started in 1946 in the San Fernando Valley community of Van Nuys by Si L. Bercutt. The store's motto was "Everything to build anything."

Victor M. Carter bought the ailing Van Nuys hardware store in 1949. He introduced the concept of a self-service hardware store with a "do it yourself" training component that became the model for The Home Depot. Carter built Builders Emporium into a leading self-serve retail operation and the largest hardware store in the United States, selling it in 1956, to acquire controlling interest in Republic Pictures just a few years later.

== Acquisition ==
In 1962, Builders Emporium was acquired by Food Giant Markets, Inc. In 1967, Builders Emporium was acquired by Two Guys when Two Guys purchased its parent company Food Giant Markets, Inc. At the time of acquisition, Builders Emporium had 14 locations throughout Southern California. Two Guys later renamed itself Vornado.

The chain was sold by Vornado to Wickes in two installment in 1978. In January of that year, Vornado sold 47 Builders Emporium centers in California to Wickes. In the following month, Vornado sold 12 Builders Emporium home improvement centers in New York, New Jersey and Pennsylvania to Wickes.

== Shutdown ==
Builders Emporium was forced to close in 1993 after its former parent had a number of financial problems during the previous decade.

== Campaigns ==
Builders Emporium was owned by the Santa Monica-based Wickes Companies, and an ad campaign from 1982–1988 features the slogan "We got the message, Mr. Sigoloff", referring to former Wickes chairman and CEO Sanford C. Sigoloff, in a campaign to restore credibility, consumer confidence, and sales to the chain after Wickes' bankruptcy. The advertising campaign was a huge hit credited with helping the chain increase sales by 25% the first year it was launched. In 1988 the chain had sales of about US$675 million.

== See also ==
- Builders Square
