= Victor M. Carter =

American businessman (1909–2004)

Victor M. Carter (born Kartozynsky; August 21, 1909 – March 27, 2004) was a Russian-born American businessman, civic leader, and philanthropist. He was known for his leadership in retail and film enterprises, as well as his significant contributions to Jewish and multicultural causes in Southern California and Israel. He owned Builders Emporium from 1949 to 1956 and ran Republic Corporation from 1958 to 1967.

== Philanthropy and civic engagement ==
After retiring in 1967, Carter focused on philanthropy. He served as president of the Jewish Federation Council and the Jewish Community Foundation of Greater Los Angeles, and chaired both the United Jewish Welfare Fund and the State of Israel Bond campaign.

He held major roles with Tel Aviv University, Hebrew University of Jerusalem, Cedars‑Sinai Medical Center, City of Hope, and Histadrut, and led international investment conferences in Jerusalem in 1968 and 1969.

== Support for Jewish culture ==
Together with his wife, Adrea Carter, he was a prominent donor to Israeli institutions. They funded the Victor M. & Adrea Carter Garden & Playground at the Jerusalem Biblical Zoo and supported heating programs for the elderly via the Jerusalem Foundation.

His work in Israel Bonds and fundraising for Tel Aviv and Hebrew University further reinforced his support for Israeli development and education.

== U.S.–Japan relations ==
As president of the Japan–America Society of Southern California, Carter was awarded the Alexis de Tocqueville Society Award in 1987 by United Way. The National Society later renamed their highest honor the Victor M. Carter Award in his memory.

== Multicultural and civil rights advocacy ==
Carter was a vocal advocate for multicultural inclusion. He supported Latino, African-American, Japanese-American, and Asian-American communities, championed civil rights, helped integrate the Los Angeles Fire Department, and funded development programs in underserved areas.

== Honors and recognition ==
- Victor M. Carter Humanitarian Award (1984), established by United Way of Greater Los Angeles
- Alexis de Tocqueville Society Award (1987), United Way
- Sword of David (Israel, 1964)
- Third Order of the Imperial Treasure (Japan, 1968)
- Honorary Doctor of Philosophy, Tel Aviv University

== Personal life ==
Carter married Adrea Zucker in 1927. They had two children, Fanya and Robert (deceased 1946), and three granddaughters: Sheri, Dr. Leigh Silverton, and Robin.

Carter died on March 27, 2004, at the age of 94.

=== Adrea Carter ===
Adrea Carter (née Zucker; November 10, 1910 – July 24, 2006) was an American philanthropist. Along with her husband Victor, she supported cultural, educational, and humanitarian initiatives in both the United States and Israel. She co-led fundraising campaigns for Israel Bonds and Tel Aviv University, and promoted multicultural inclusion efforts in Los Angeles.

Adrea died on July 24, 2006, at the age of 95.
