= Republic Pictures =

American movie and serial production company

Republic Pictures Corporation
- Logo used since 2023
- Type: Subsidiary
- Industry: Motion pictures
- Predecessor: Monogram Pictures; Mascot Pictures; Liberty Pictures; Majestic Pictures; Chesterfield Pictures; Invincible Pictures
- Founded: September 25, 1935; 91 years ago (original); March 24, 2023; 3 years ago (relaunched)
- Founder: Herbert J. Yates
- Defunct: 1967; 59 years ago (original)
- Fate: Ceased producing feature films in 1959, and later sold and absorbed by National Telefilm Associates (original)
- Headquarters: Studio City, Los Angeles, California
- Area served: Worldwide
- Parent: Paramount Pictures

Republic Pictures is a film production company owned by Paramount Pictures, a division of the Skydance Motion Pictures arm of Skydance. Its history dates back to Republic Pictures Corporation, an American film studio that originally operated from September 25, 1935 to 1967, based in Los Angeles, California, before being relaunched on March 24, 2023. It had production and distribution facilities in Studio City, as well as a movie ranch in Encino.

Republic was known for specializing in Westerns, cliffhanger serials, and B-films emphasizing action and mystery. The studio was also notable for developing the careers of such famous Western stars as Roy Rogers, Gene Autry, and John Wayne. It was also responsible for the financial management and distribution of several big-budget feature films directed by John Ford, as well as one Shakespeare motion picture directed by Orson Welles.

Under the supervising leadership of Herbert J. Yates, Republic was considered a mini-major film studio, producing almost 1,000 motion pictures.

== History ==
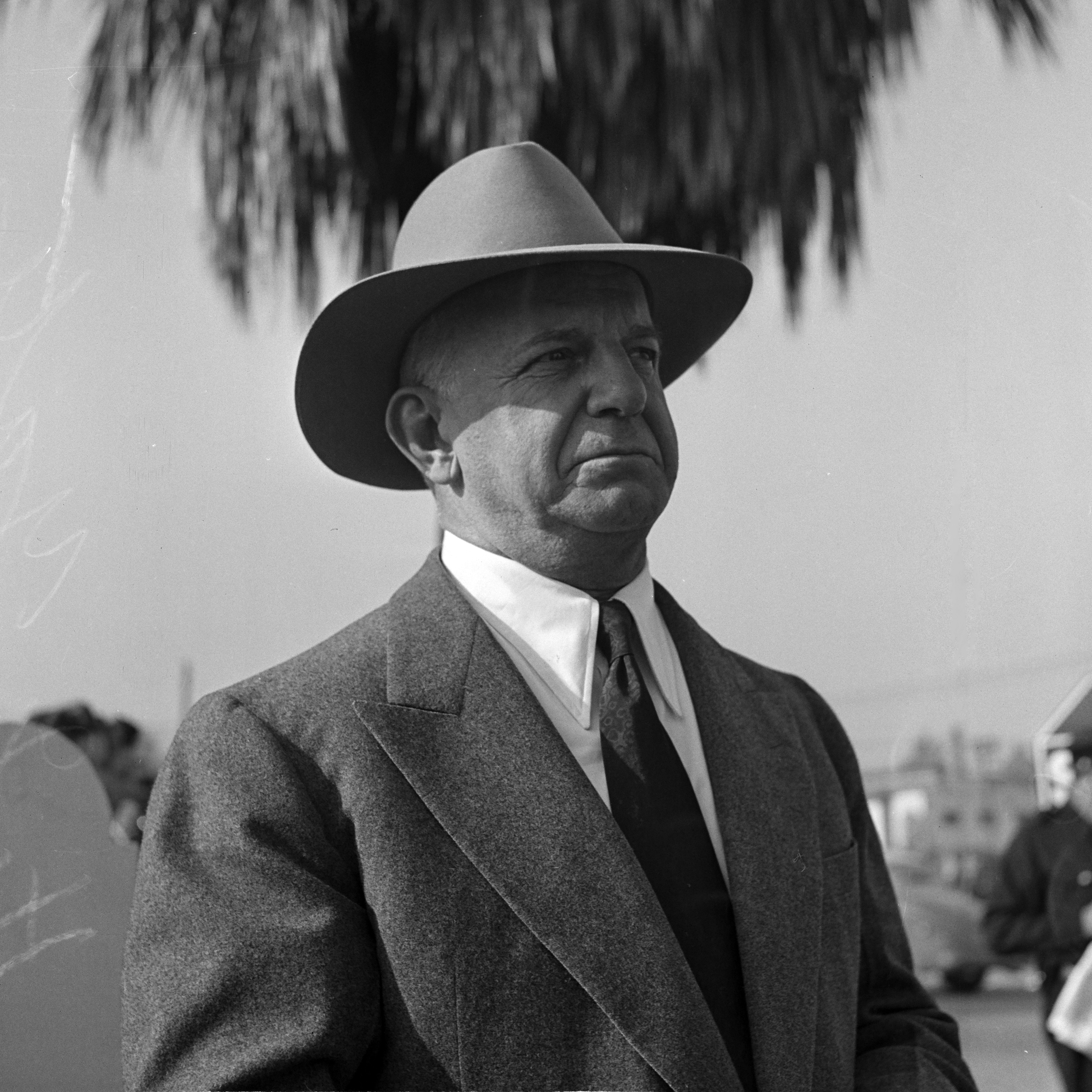
Herbert J. Yates

=== As movie studio ===
Created in 1935 by Herbert J. Yates, a longtime investor in film (having invested in 20th Century Pictures at its founding in 1933) and owner of the film processing laboratory Consolidated Film Industries, Republic was initially founded upon Yates' acquisition of six smaller independent Poverty Row studios.

In the depths of the Great Depression, Yates' laboratory was no longer serving the major studios, which had developed their own in-house laboratories for purposes of both economy and control, while the small, independent producers were going under in the face of increased competition from the majors combined with the general impact of the depressed economy. In 1935, he thus decided to create a studio of his own to insure Consolidated's stability. Six surviving small companies (Monogram Pictures, Mascot Pictures, Liberty Pictures, Majestic Pictures, Chesterfield Pictures, (and Invincible Pictures)) were all in debt to Yates' lab. He prevailed upon these studios to merge under his leadership or else face foreclosure on their outstanding lab bills. Yates' new company, Republic Pictures Corporation, was presented to their producer-owners as a collaborative enterprise focused on low-budget product.

- The largest of Republic's components was Monogram Pictures, run by producers Trem Carr and W. Ray Johnston, which specialized in "B" films and operated a nationwide distribution system.
- The most technologically advanced of the studios that now comprised Republic was Nat Levine's Mascot Pictures Corporation, which had been making serials almost exclusively since the mid-1920s and had a first-class production facility, the former Mack Sennett lot in Studio City. Mascot also had just discovered Gene Autry and signed him to a contract as a singing cowboy star.
- Larry Darmour's Majestic Pictures had developed an exhibitor following, with big-name stars and rented sets giving his humble productions a polished look.
- Republic took its original "Liberty Bell" logo from M. H. Hoffman's Liberty Pictures (not to be confused with Frank Capra's short-lived Liberty Films that produced his It's a Wonderful Life) as well as Hoffman's talents as a low-budget film producer.
- Chesterfield Pictures and Invincible Pictures, two sister companies under the same ownership, were skilled in producing low-budget melodramas and mysteries.

Acquiring and integrating these six companies enabled Republic to begin life with an experienced production staff, a company of veteran B-film supporting players and at least one very promising star, a complete distribution system, and a functioning and modern studio. In exchange for merging, the principals were promised independence in their productions under the Republic aegis, and higher budgets with which to improve the quality of the films. After he had learned the basics of film production and distribution from his partners, Yates began asserting more and more authority over their film departments, and dissension arose in the ranks. Carr and Johnston left and reactivated Monogram Pictures in 1937; Darmour resumed independent production for Columbia Pictures; Levine left and never recovered from the loss of his studio, staff and stars, all of whom now were contracted to Republic and Yates. Meanwhile, Yates installed a staff of new, "associate" producers who were loyal to him. Freed of partners, Yates presided over what was now his film studio and acquiring senior production and management staff who served him as employees, not experienced peers with independent ideas and agendas.

Republic also acquired Brunswick Records for recording sessions with singing cowboys Roy Rogers and Gene Autry. They hired Cy Feuer as head of the studio's music department.

At the 1958 annual meeting, Yates announced the end of motion picture production.

=== Serials and television series ===
Shut out of their attempts to acquire television broadcasting licenses, most studios resisted making their film libraries available to local stations. Republic, however, established a subsidiary, Hollywood Television Service, in December 1950. Earl Collins, Republic's branch manager in Los Angeles, accepted the presidency of the new TV arm. Collins made two major announcements: effective June 25, 1951, much of Republic's backlog of feature films would be available to local stations; and, effective that same day, Republic's studio lot would be available for rental to independent TV producers. The Republic features, including the Gene Autry and Roy Rogers westerns, were uniformly edited to a running time of 53 minutes and 30 seconds each, in order to fit neatly into one-hour time slots. This was looked upon by TV programmers as a tremendous convenience, and Hollywood Television Service found hundreds of ready customers.

Hollywood Television Service also produced television shows filmed in the same style as Republic's serials, such as The Adventures of Fu Manchu (1956). Also, in 1952, the Republic studio lot became the first home of MCA's series factory, Revue Productions.

While it appeared that Republic was well suited for television series production, it did not have the finances or vision to do so. Yet by the mid-1950s, thanks to its sale of old features and leasing of studio space to MCA, television was the prop supporting Republic. During this period, the studio produced Commando Cody: Sky Marshal of the Universe; unsuccessful as a theater release, the 12-part serial was later sold to NBC for television distribution.

Talent agent MCA exerted influence at the studio, bringing in some high-paid clients for occasional features, and it was rumored at various times that either MCA or deposed MGM head Louis B. Mayer would buy the studio outright.

As the demand and market for motion pictures declined with the increasing popularity of television, Republic began to cut back on its films, slowing production from 40 features annually in the early 1950s to 18 in 1957 (in 1956—the year the company had recorded a profit of $919,000—it temporarily ceased production of features.) Perhaps inspired by the success of American International Pictures catering to teenaged audiences, Republic dispensed with its old "no exploitation" rule and released several films in the late 1950s about juvenile delinquency, such as The Wayward Girl (1957), Juvenile Jungle (1958), and Young and Wild (1958).

A tearful Yates informed shareholders at the 1958 annual meeting that feature film production was ending; the distribution offices were shut down the following year.

=== As Republic Corporation ===
On July 1, 1958, Victor M. Carter, a Los Angeles businessman and turnaround specialist, acquired controlling interest in the company for nearly $6 million, becoming its president. He turned Republic into a diversified business that included plastics and appliances in addition to its film and studio rentals and Consolidated Film Industries, renaming the company Republic Corporations. In 1963, having used the studio for series production for years, Republic began leasing its backlot to other firms, including CBS. In February 1967, Republic's studio was purchased outright by CBS and, having more than quadrupled the stock price for shareholders, Carter sold his controlling interest. Other than producing a 1966 package of 26 Century 66 100-minute made-for-TV movies edited from some of the studio's serials to cash in on the popularity of the Batman television series, Republic Pictures' role in Hollywood ended with the sale of the studio lot. Republic sold its library of films to National Telefilm Associates (NTA).

Non-entertainment acquisitions included Mansbach Metal Company and Kentucky Electric Steel Company, both acquired in September 1968. Republic reported a $13 million loss for the year ending October 1970, and a $43 million loss for the year ended July 1971. The company promoted Sanford Sigoloff, who would later earn a reputation as a turnaround expert, to lead as President.

Today, the studio lot is known as Radford Studio Center. In 2006, it became home to the network's Los Angeles stations KCBS-TV and KCAL-TV. In 2008, the CBS network relocated from its Hollywood Television City operations to the Radford lot, and its executives are based from the site.

== Film library ==
In its early years, Republic was sometimes labeled a "Poverty Row" company, as its primary products were B movies and serials. Most of the technical staff had been with Mascot, a serial specialist, and thus was already geared to the steady production of weekly chapter plays. Republic's own serials began in 1936 and developed a following very quickly. Many were live-action adaptations of radio and comic-strip adventures. Dick Tracy (1937), starring Ralph Byrd as the intrepid detective, was so popular that it spawned three sequels. The Lone Ranger (1938) and its follow-up The Lone Ranger Rides Again (1939) were well received, and Adventures of Captain Marvel (1941) reached new heights of visual effects. Serials produced after World War II were more economy-minded, with the running times slashed from 20 minutes per episode to 13 minutes, and with the cliffhanger endings borrowed from older Republic serials and features. The studio also stopped licensing expensive comic-strip and radio properties, and instead created generic cops-and-robbers stories and science-fiction adventures. Despite the obvious economies, the Republic serials still found an audience, the last film being King of the Carnival (1955). Republic kept many of its serials in circulation; they were still playing in local movie theaters well into the 1960s.

The backbone of the company was its feature-length Westerns. Many of its Western film leads — among them John Wayne, Gene Autry, Roy Rogers, Bill Elliott, Allan "Rocky" Lane, and Rex Allen — became recognizable stars at Republic. However, by the mid-1940s, Yates was producing better-quality pictures, mounting big-budget fare such as The Quiet Man (1952), Sands of Iwo Jima (1949), Johnny Guitar (1954), and The Maverick Queen (1956). Another distinguishing aspect of Republic Pictures was Yates' avoidance of any controversial subject matter (exploitation films being a staple of B movies), in contrast to the other "Poverty Row" studios that often dodged the Production Code.

Republic's leading female star was Judy Canova, who was enormously popular in Republic's customer base of small towns and rural areas. Republic produced many "hillbilly" rural musicals and comedies featuring Canova and the Weaver Brothers and Elviry. She left Republic after a salary dispute in 1943, but was wooed back into the fold in 1951.

In 1946, Republic incorporated animation into its Gene Autry feature film Sioux City Sue. It turned out well enough for the studio to dabble in animated cartoons. After leaving Warner Bros. in 1946, Bob Clampett approached Republic and directed a single cartoon, It's a Grand Old Nag, featuring the equine character Charlie Horse. Republic management, however, had second thoughts owing to dwindling profits and discontinued the series. Clampett took his direction credit under the name "Kilroy". Republic also released another cartoon series in 1949 (this time without Clampett): a free-wheeling series of animated travelogues called Jerky Journeys, written and produced by Leonard Levinson, but only four cartoons were made.

From the mid-1940s, Republic films often featured Vera Hruba Ralston, a former ice skater from Czechoslovakia who had won the heart of Yates, marrying him in 1952. She was originally featured in musicals as Republic's answer to Sonja Henie, but Yates tried to build her up as a dramatic star, casting her in leading roles opposite important male stars. Yates billed her as "the most beautiful woman in films", but her charms were lost on the moviegoing public while her noticeable Czech accent limited her range, and soon exhibitors complained that Republic was producing too many Ralston pictures. Years later, John Wayne admitted that he had departed Republic in 1952 over the prospect of having to appear in yet another film with her. Yates remained Ralston's most ardent supporter, and she continued to appear in Republic features until its final production, Spoilers of the Forest (1957).

On-screen logo since 1949 to 1959

By the mid-to-late-1940s, the American film industry faced an existential threat, the result of years of wartime stress on costs and the postwar exchange and trade restrictions enacted by the nations of Continental Europe (practically closing off the market to smaller studios such as Republic), the Paramount Case (even though Republic never owned more than a handful of theaters), and the rise of television. In 1947, Yates stopped the production of short subjects, reduced the amount of serials, and organized Republic's feature output into four types of films: "Jubilee", usually a Western shot in seven days for about $50,000; "Anniversary", filmed in 14–15 days for $175,000-$200,000; "Deluxe", major productions made with a budget of around $500,000; and "Premiere", which were usually made by top-rank directors who most often did not work for Republic, such as John Ford, Fritz Lang and Frank Borzage, and which could have budgets of $1,000,000 or more. Some of these "Deluxe" films were produced by independent companies and were picked up for release by Republic.

Although Republic released most of its films in black and white, it occasionally produced higher-budgeted films such as The Red Pony (1949) and The Quiet Man in Technicolor. During the late 1940s and 1950s, Yates utilized a low-cost, two-color process called Trucolor (similar to Cinecolor, favoring blues and oranges) in many Republic films, including Johnny Guitar, The Last Command (1955), and Magic Fire (1956). In 1956, the studio devised its own widescreen film process, Naturama, and The Maverick Queen was the first film made in that process.

== Re-establishment ==
=== Republic Entertainment Inc. ===
Following the immense success of their syndication of the Republic Pictures catalogue to cable television, National Telefilm Associates announced on December 28, 1984, that they had acquired the logos, copyrights, and trademarks of Republic Pictures Corporation and effectively renamed themselves as such. A television production unit was set up under the Republic name and offered, among other things, off-network repeats of the CBS series Beauty and the Beast and game show Press Your Luck in syndication. There were also a few theatrical films, including Freeway, Ruby in Paradise, Dark Horse, Live Nude Girls, and Bound. At the same time, subsidiary NTA Home Entertainment was renamed Republic Pictures Home Video and began remarketing the original Republic film library. In 1985, the company bought out Blackhawk Films, and eventually, Republic decided to close Blackhawk in 1987.

Also that year, Republic Pictures Home Video, the home video division of Republic Pictures, had signed an agreement with Hawk Company, headed by Robert Clouse, in order to gain access to 31 projects that were developed by Hawk, for home video release, and that Republic Pictures Home Video received a 24% share in the newly formed Hawk Company organization. In January 1993, Blockbuster Entertainment announced they would purchase a 35% stake in Republic,

=== As a Paramount/Skydance subsidiary ===
On March 24, 2023, Paramount Global announced that it would revive the Republic Pictures brand, with the intention of it serving as the company's acquisitions label.
