= Wickes Companies =

American manufacturing & retail conglomerate

Wickes Companies, Inc.
- Logo used from 1970, designed by John Greiner at Unimark International
- Type: Private
- Industry: Lumber and building materials retail stores; Apparel and hosiery manufacturing; Automotive and electronics parts manufacturing
- Founded: 1854; 172 years ago
- Founder: Henry Dunn Wickes; Edward Noyes Wickes
- Defunct: October 12, 2007; 19 years ago
- Fate: Ceased operations
- Successor: Collins & Aikman
- Headquarters: Santa Monica, California, United States
- Number of employees: 28,000 (1984)

Wickes Companies was a diversified manufacturing and retail conglomerate. It was renamed after its subsidiary Collins & Aikman in 1992. The company ceased operations in 2007.

== History ==
Brothers Henry Dunn Wickes and Edward Noyes Wickes moved to Flint, Michigan, from New York in 1854, becoming involved in the area's lumber industry. The brothers, along with partner H.W. Wood, later established Genesee Iron Works, a foundry and machine shop; after buying out Wood, the business was renamed Wickes Bros. Iron Works and moved to Saginaw, Michigan, to be closer to a source of pig iron. The company manufactured gang saws and refurbished and resold other sawmill equipment. A separate business was established to manufacture boilers. After discovering a large deposit of graphite on a visit to Mexico, the brothers established the United States Graphite Company. The three companies were merged in 1947 to form the Wickes Corp.

In 1952, Wickes opened a retail lumber store in Bay City, Michigan, the Bay City Cash Way Company. The outlet saw success selling lumber to small independent lumber companies, additional outlets were opened, and the business was renamed Wickes Lumber Co. in 1962. The boiler business was sold in 1959. Wickes was also buying other businesses; among them, it acquired the Michigan Bean Company, one of the country's largest bean storage facilities, in December 1955 in an all-stock transaction valued at $1.6 million. Other acquisitions came in the areas of retail furniture, consumer credit, modular housing, and commercial construction. In 1978, Wickes bought the Builders Emporium chain of retail home improvement stores.

== Gamble-Skogmo acquisition and bankruptcy ==
On August 12, 1980, shareholders approved Wickes' acquisition of Gamble-Skogmo Inc., a Minneapolis, Minnesota-based retail conglomerate, for more than $200 million. The corporation's name would be known as The Wickes Companies upon finalization. Although this grew Wickes' aggregate sales to more than $4 billion per year, the company took on significant new debt. In May 1981, Wickes shut down Tempo, a former Gamble-Skogmo subsidiary operating 29 discount variety stores in the Western U.S.

Wickes started bankruptcy reorganization in April 1982. With $1.6 billion in debt at stake, it was at the time largest Chapter 11 reorganization since the passage of the Bankruptcy Reform Act of 1978. Sanford C. Sigoloff, a specialist in guiding and restructuring companies in bankruptcy proceedings, was brought in as CEO. After selling off or closing many of its general retail businesses and other divisions, Wickes emerged from bankruptcy in 1985.

== Post-bankruptcy acquisitions ==
Shortly after emerging from bankruptcy in 1985, Wickes acquired the Gulf and Western Consumer and Industrial Products Group division of Gulf and Western Industries for approximately $1 billion. The division included the following subsidiaries:

- A.P.S.
- Bohn Aluminum and Brass Corporation
- H. Koch & Sons
- Kayser-Roth Corporation
- Simmons Company
- Unicord

W.R. Grace, another conglomerate which Sigoloff had recently led through restructuring, began to sell off its 660-store retail division piecemeal in 1985. Wickes bought Orchard Supply Hardware and Home Centers West from Grace in May 1986.

=== Wickes Lumber ===
In April 1988, Wickes completed the spin-out of the Wickes Lumber Company as a new public company. In June 1997, Wickes Lumber changed its corporate name to "Wickes Inc." In its last published financial statements, Wickes Inc. reported a net loss of over $45 million for the six months leading up to June 2003. In January 2004, Wickes Inc. filed for Chapter 11 bankruptcy. In September 2004, an agreement was reached to sell its 59 remaining lumberyards to various buyers, liquidating the company.

== Transformation into Collins & Aikman ==
The Wickes Companies bought Collins & Aikman in 1987 for $1.16 billion.

In 1989, Wickes was merged into WCI Holdings, controlled by the private equity firms The Blackstone Group and Wasserstein Perella & Co. WCI changed its name to Collins & Aikman and moved its headquarters from California to Charlotte, North Carolina in 1992.

Amid liquidity issues and questions about its accounting practices, Collins & Aikman filed for bankruptcy in 2005. After operations were shut down or sold off, the company closed and was dissolved in October 2007.

== See also ==
- Wickes, the United Kingdom-based home improvement retailer that started as a division of Wickes Companies
- Wickes Furniture
