= Wickes Furniture =

Defunct American retailer

- Type: Private company
- Industry: Furnishings
- Founded: 1971
- Defunct: 2008
- Fate: Bankrupt And Liquidated
- Headquarters: Wheeling, Illinois, U.S.
- Products: Home Furniture

Wickes Furniture was a privately held chain of furniture stores based in Wheeling, Illinois. The company was founded in 1971 with a showroom in Fridley, Minnesota, and at its peak, operated 43 stores in California, Illinois, Indiana, Michigan, Minnesota, Nevada, Texas and Oregon.

The company, despite its expansion into other markets, declared bankruptcy in 2008, and eventually went into liquidation for failure to find a buyer or an investor. At the time of its closing, it was owned by Sun Capital Partners.

== History ==
After its founding in 1971, Wickes Furniture had grown to 43 showrooms and five distribution centers. The company had over 1,700 employees, making it one of the Top 25 Furniture Retailers in the United States. By the beginning of the 1980s, it had grown into the United States' largest furniture retailer, but it closed nine of its then twenty four stores in 1982 in the wake of the bankruptcy of its corporate parent, Wickes Companies.

After Wickes Companies was purchased by two investment firms in 1988, Wickes Furniture was sold in a management buyout led by Wickes Furniture president, John A. Klein, and the private equity firm Kelso & Co. in April 1989.

Master Home Furniture, based in Taiwan, purchased Wickes Furniture in 1998; the company went into receivership in 2000, when Master Home Furniture defaulted on its bank debt. Master Home Furniture sold one stake of Wickes Furniture in February 1999.

In August 2002, Sun Capital Partners teamed with an affiliate of the furniture chain Rooms To Go to purchase Wickes Furniture from Master Home. In March 2004, Sun Capital bought out Rooms To Go's interest in Wickes. In March 2004, John Disa was hired as president and CEO of Wickes Furniture by private investment firm Sun Capital Partners. Before he joined Wickes, he spent most of his career in athletic shoe businesses.

== Bankruptcy ==
In May 2007, Wickes Furniture announced it would close five stores in Minnesota, and a Brooklyn Center distribution center, as part of its plan to focus its resources in expanding into markets in California, Chicago, Portland, and Las Vegas.

In mid to the end of 2007, however, the furniture industry was hit hard by the high cost of fuel prices and woes from the subprime mortgage crisis. Wickes Furniture filed for Chapter 11 Bankruptcy protection on February 3, 2008. At that time, Wickes operated thirty eight stores. The company listed debts of more than $50 million, and assets of less than $50,000.

== Liquidation ==
On February 14, 2008, it was announced by Richard Clausing, the company's chief financial officer, that Wickes Furniture needed a buyer or an investor by February 25, 2008, to recapitalize the company and to keep from shutting its doors, due to a deadline set by the court and creditors. However, neither of them came forward, so Wickes, with bankruptcy court approval, commenced its liquidation sales in March 2008, and closed all of its remaining stores.

On January 1, 2012, Wickes Furniture reopened, and rebranded, as Wyckes Furniture.
