= List of county highways in Douglas County, Kansas =

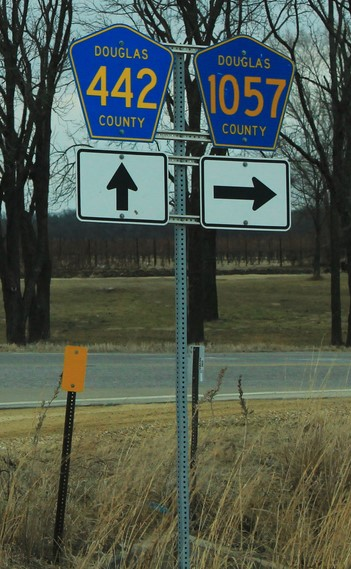
Intersection of CR-442 and CR-1057, between Lawrence and Eudora in northeastern Douglas County. The intersection sits less than a mile north of CR-1057's interchange with K-10.

Douglas County, Kansas, maintains an extensive network of county highways to serve the rural areas and state parks of the county. It is one of a handful of Kansas counties to do so.

The major county highways are set up on a grid. East–west-oriented roads have a three-digit number beginning with the numeral "4" and ending in an even digit. The further north the road, the lower the number; the further south, the higher the number. North–south-oriented roads have a four-digit number beginning with "10" and ending in an odd digit. The further west the road, the lower the number; the further east, the higher the number.

There are also minor county roads with one or two digits that travel a short distance or serve a state park.

None of the county highways enters Lawrence, the county seat.

The maximum speed limit on all county highways in Douglas County is 55 mph (89 km/h).

== Lists ==
=== Major east–west oriented roads ===
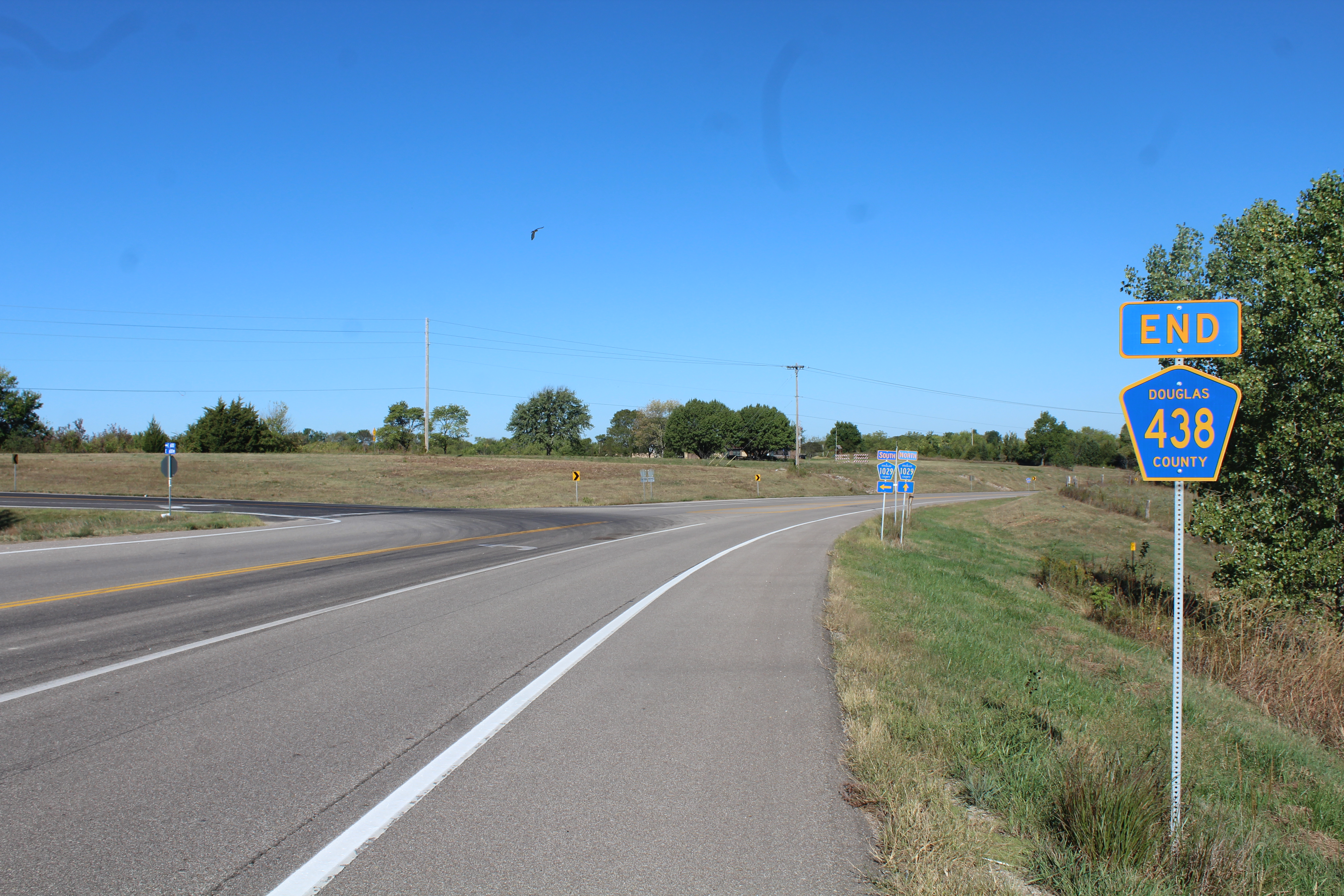
The western terminus of CR-438 at CR-1029

Highway	Western terminus	Eastern terminus	Notes
CR 438	CR 1029 3 mi. south of Lecompton; road continues as CR 1029 north	Lawrence city limits a half mile north of the intersection of Kasold Drive and Peterson Road	Part of the "Farmer's Turnpike" between Lawrence and Lecompton
CR 442 (west)	Shawnee County line; road continues as SE 45th Street	US-40 three miles west of Lawrence	Known to locals as "Stull Road" as it passes through Stull
CR 442 (east)	Intersection of Noria Road/East 1750 Road near the East Hills Business Park	Johnson County line; road continues as W. 103rd Street en route to DeSoto	Former alignment of K-10
CR 458	Shawnee County Line; road continues as SE 89th Street	Johnson County Line; road continues as W. 150th Street en route to Olathe.	
CR 460	Osage County Line; road continues as E. 133rd Street	Johnson County Line; road continues as W. 159th Street	
CR 474	CR 1039 at Douglas-Franklin County Line	US-59 at Douglas-Franklin County Line	This highway runs along the Douglas-Franklin County Line

=== Major north–south oriented roads ===
Highway	Southern terminus	Northern terminus	Notes
CR 1023	Franklin County Line; road continues as Florida Terrace	CR 1029 in Lecompton	
CR 1029 (north)	CR 442 about 1 mi. north of Clinton Lake	Jefferson County Line; road continues across Kansas River as Lecompton Road en route to Perry	
CR 1029 (south)	Franklin County Line	CR 458 near Clinton Lake	
CR 1039	Franklin County Line	CR 1 / CR 458 near Clinton Lake	
CR 1045 (north)	US-24 / US-59 in Midland, 2 miles north of Lawrence	Jefferson County line; road continues north to McLouth	
CR 1045 (south)	Franklin County Line, road continues as Old Highway 59	US-59 / CR 458, 2 miles south of Lawrence	Former alignment of US-59.
CR 1055	Franklin County Line 3 mi. south of Baldwin City; road continues as Ohio Road.	K-10 in southeast Lawrence; road continues northward as Haskell Avenue	
CR 1057	CR 460 east of Vinland	CR 442 less than a mile north of interchange with K-10	
CR 1061	Franklin County line; road continues as Vermont Road en route to becoming 1st Street in Wellsville	Leavenworth County line at Kansas River north of Eudora; road continues as Leavenworth County Highway 1 en route to a junction with the Kansas Turnpike and Tonganoxie	

=== Minor county highways ===
Highway	Western or Southern terminus	Eastern or Northern terminus	Notes
CR 1	CR 1E / CR 1W at Lone Star Lake	CR 458 / CR 1039 near Clinton Lake	
CR 1E	CR 460 southeast of Lone Star Lake	CR 1 / CR 1W north of Lone Star Lake	
CR 1W	CR 460 southwest of Lone Star Lake	CR 1 / CR 1E north of Lone Star Lake	
CR 1S	CR 460 south of Lone Star Lake	Lone Star Lake	
CR 2	CR 458 / CR 1023 in western Douglas County	West side of Clinton Lake	
CR 3	CR 460 southeast of Lone Star Lake	CR 1E east of Lone Star Lake	
CR 4	CR 6 west of Clinton	North side of Clinton	
CR 4W	CR 4 north of the junction with CRs 4 and 6	Clinton cemetery	
CR 5	N 200 Road and E 750 Road	US-56 between Globe and Worden	
CR 6	CR 458 / CR 1023 southwest of Clinton	In Clinton	
CR 7	CR 438 northwest of Lawrence	In Lake View	
CR 9	In North Lawrence, continues as North 7th Street.	US-24 / US-40 near Lawrence Municipal Airport	
CR 10	CR 1029 in SW Douglas County	CR 1 north of Lone Star Lake	
CR 11	High Street / Lawrence Street in Baldwin City	US-56 just outside Baldwin City	Part of original route of US-50
CR 12	CR 1055 on the north side of Baldwin City	NW side of Douglas County Lake	
CR 14	High Street / First Street in Baldwin City	US-56 on the east side of Baldwin City	Part of original route of US-50
