= Wakarusa Township, Kansas =

Wakarusa Township
- Township
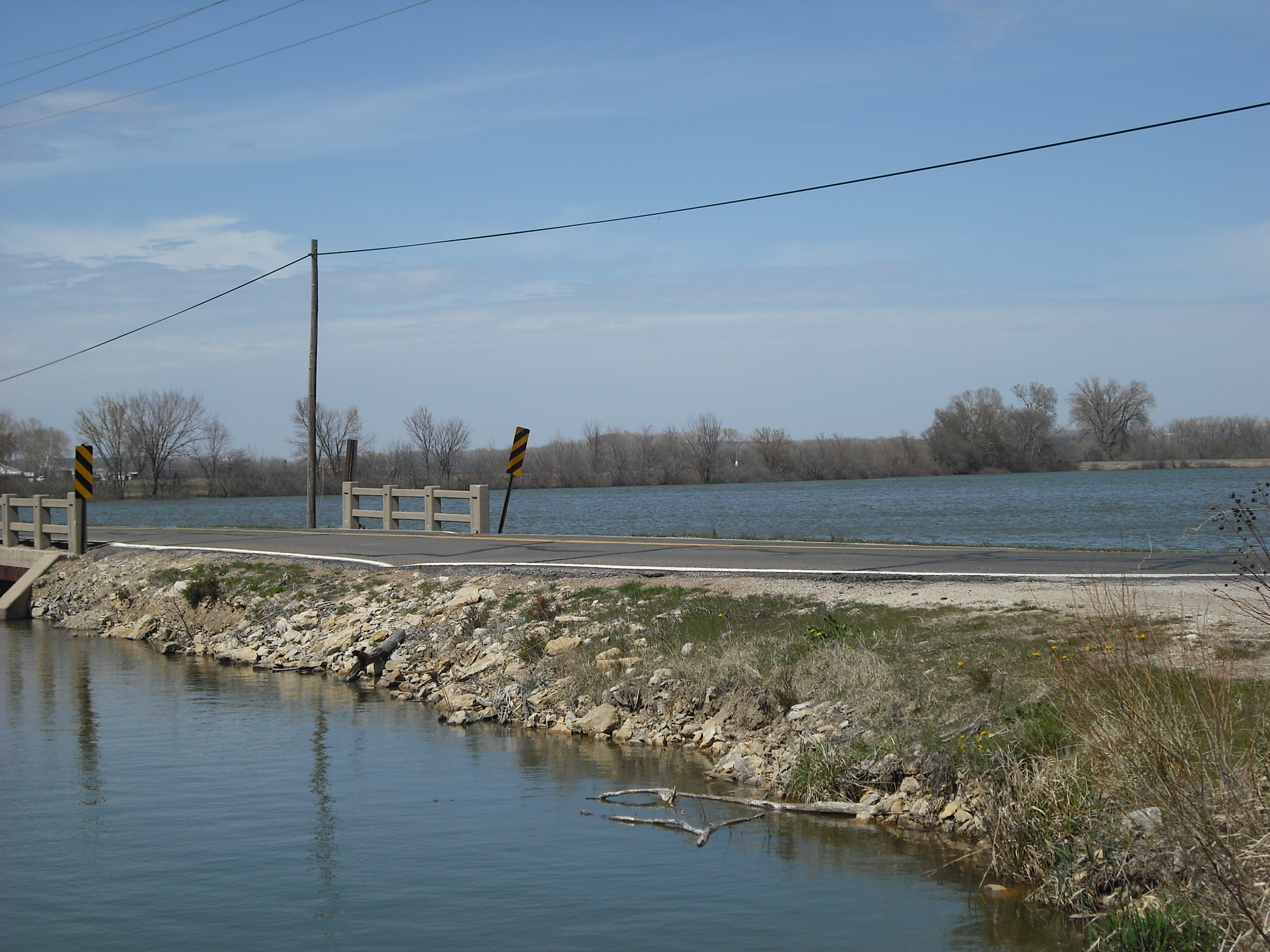
- Lakeview Lake

- Location in Douglas County
- Coordinates: 38°56′10″N 095°15′21″W
- Country: United States
- State: Kansas
- County: Douglas

Area
  - Total: 46.75 sq mi (121.07 km^{2})
  - Land: 45.90 sq mi (118.87 km^{2})
  - Water: 0.85 sq mi (2.19 km^{2}) 1.81%
- Elevation: 866 ft (264 m)

Population (2020)
  - Total: 2,102
  - Density: 45.80/sq mi (17.68/km^{2})
- GNIS feature ID: 0479514

Wakarusa Township is a township in Douglas County, Kansas, United States. As of the 2020 census, its population was 2,102.

== History ==
It was named for the Wakarusa River which flows through Douglas County from Wabaunsee County to the Kansas River near Eudora.

== Geography ==
Wakarusa Township covers an area of 46.74 square miles (121.1 km^{2}) surrounding the county seat of Lawrence. According to the United States Geological Survey, it contains one cemetery, Richland.

Lake View Lake is within this township. The streams of Baldwin Creek, Burroughs Creek, Coal Creek, Washington Creek and Yankee Tank Creek run through this township.

== Adjacent townships ==
- Rural Township, Jefferson County (northwest)
- Grant Township, Douglas County (north)
- Reno Township, Leavenworth County (northeast)
- Eudora Township, Douglas County (east)
- Palmyra Township, Douglas County (southeast)
- Willow Springs Township, Douglas County (southwest)
- Clinton Township, Douglas County (west)
- Kanwaka Township, Douglas County (west)
- Lecompton Township, Douglas County (west)

== Communities ==
Although these towns may not be incorporated or populated, they are still placed on maps produced by the county. The city of Lawrence is considered governmentally independent and is not included on this list.

- Franklin, located at 38°56′16″N 95°11′10″W
- Lake View, located at 39°00′38″N 95°17′37″W
- Noria, located at 38°57′00″N 95°10′54″W
- Sibleyville, located at 38°53′04″N 95°12′19″W

== Transportation ==
Wakarusa Township is served directly by one Interstate Highway, one US Highway and one state highway:

- I-70
- US-59
- K-10

Wakarusa Township is served with direct routes to one Interstate Highway, two US Highways and one state highway:

- I-35
- US-24
- US-40
- K-32

== Places of interest ==
- Wells Overlook. A county-owned park with a watchtower that offers a scenic view of the surrounding area, including Lawrence. The overlook was used during the Bleeding Kansas era as a look out for pro-slavery threats.
- Lake View. A natural oxbow lake formed from the Kansas River. Lake View was once a popular lakeside resort and still has a small population today.
- The Baker Wetlands are between the Lawrence city limits and the Wakarusa River along 31st Street and supports various species of plants, birds and animals.
- The townsite of Franklin, along K-10, was once a pro-slavery town that competed with Lawrence. When Lawrence was burned in 1863 most of the houses were moved to help with the rebuilding.
