= Lecompton Township, Kansas =

Lecompton Township
- Township
- Lecompton Rest Area along U.S. Highway 40

- Location in Douglas County
- Coordinates: 39°01′45″N 095°24′36″W
- Country: United States
- State: Kansas
- County: Douglas

Area
  - Total: 35.53 sq mi (92.01 km^{2})
  - Land: 34.66 sq mi (89.76 km^{2})
  - Water: 0.87 sq mi (2.26 km^{2}) 2.46%
- Elevation: 974 ft (297 m)

Population (2020)
  - Total: 1,669
  - Density: 48.16/sq mi (18.59/km^{2})
- GNIS feature ID: 0478815

Lecompton Township is a township in Douglas County, Kansas, United States. As of the 2020 census, its population was 1,669.

== History ==
Lecompton Township was formed circa 1858. It was named for the town of Lecompton, which was the territorial capital of Kansas from 1855–61.

== Geography ==
Lecompton Township covers an area of 35.53 square miles (92.0 km^{2}) and contains one incorporated settlement, Lecompton. According to the USGS, it contains two cemeteries: Big Springs and Lecompton.

The streams of Coon Creek, Oakley Creek and Spring Creek run through this township.

== Adjacent townships ==
- Kaw Township, Jefferson County (northwest)
- Kentucky Township, Jefferson County (north)
- Rural Township, Jefferson County (northeast)
- Wakarusa Township, Douglas County (east)
- Kanwaka Township, Douglas County (south)
- Tecumseh Township, Shawnee County (west)

== Communities ==
Although these towns may not be incorporated or populated, they are still placed on maps produced by the county.

- Big Springs, located at 39°00′47″N 95°29′06″W
- Grover, located at 39°03′24″N 95°28′27″W
- Lecompton, located at 39°04′29″N 95°39′50″W

== Transportation ==
=== Major highways ===
- I-70, part of the Kansas Turnpike
- U.S. Highway 40

== Points of interest ==
- The Scenic River Road. This old country road travels along the Kansas River from Tecumseh to Lake View via Lecompton.
