= Palmyra Township, Kansas =

Palmyra Township
- Township
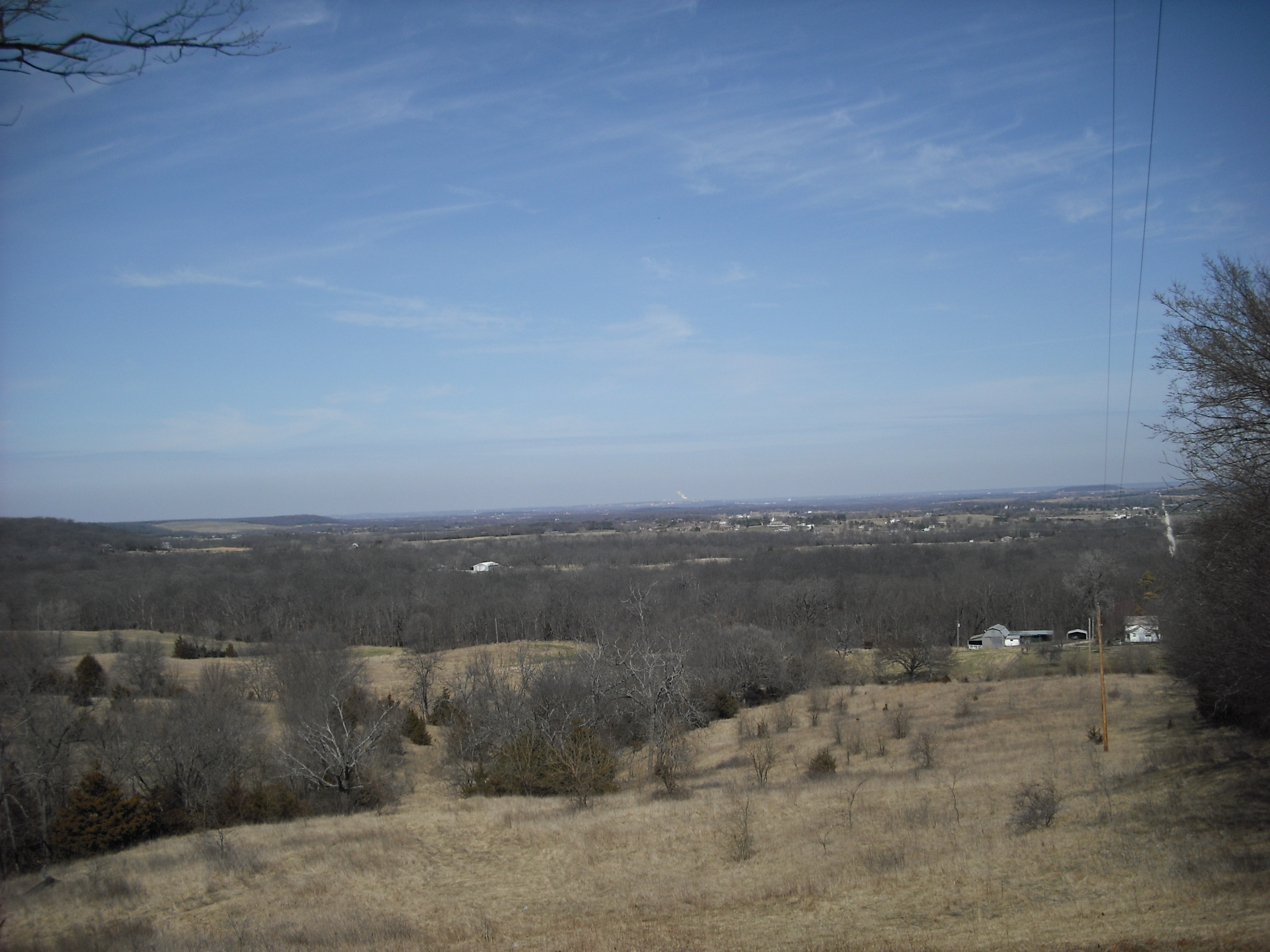
- Signal Oak, a historic spot

- Location in Douglas County
- Coordinates: 38°47′20″N 095°09′01″W
- Country: United States
- State: Kansas
- County: Douglas

Area
  - Total: 82.57 sq mi (213.86 km^{2})
  - Land: 81.92 sq mi (212.17 km^{2})
  - Water: 0.65 sq mi (1.69 km^{2}) 0.79%
- Elevation: 1,050 ft (320 m)

Population (2020)
  - Total: 7,575
  - Density: 92.47/sq mi (35.70/km^{2})
- GNIS feature ID: 0479537

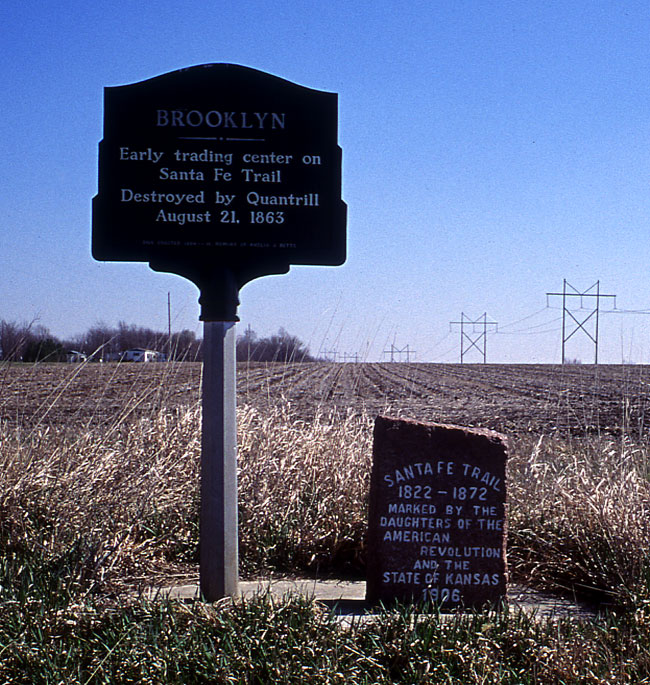
A marker near the townsite of Brooklyn

The boulder marking the location of Signal Oak

Palmyra Township is a township in Douglas County, Kansas, United States. As of 2020 census, its population was 7,575.

== History ==
It was named after a small trail stop on the Santa Fe Trail that was later absorbed into Baldwin City. When it was first established in 1855, it was called Calhoun, until 1858.

== Geography ==
Palmyra Township covers an area of 82.57 square miles (213.9 km^{2}) and contains one incorporated settlement, Baldwin City. According to the USGS, it contains six cemeteries: Baldwin City, Brumbaugh, Oakwood, Old Black Jack, Prairie City and Vinland.

The stream of Wymore Creek runs through this township.

== Adjacent townships ==
- Wakarusa Township, Douglas County (northwest)
- Eudora Township, Douglas County (northeast)
- McCamish Township, Johnson County (east)
- Richland Township, Miami County (southeast)
- Franklin Township, Franklin County (south)
- Hayes Township, Franklin County (southwest)
- Willow Springs Township, Douglas County (west)

== Communities ==
Although these towns may not be incorporated or populated, they are still placed on maps produced by the county.

- Baldwin City, located at 38°46′39″N 95°11′15″W
- Black Jack, located at 38°45′50″N 95°07′36″W
- Brooklyn, located at 38°49′06″N 95°14′29″W
- Clearfield, located at 38°49′33″N 95°05′35″W
- Prairie City, located at 38°46′03″N 95°12′35″W
- Vinland, located at 38°50′22″N 95°10′56″W

== Transportation ==
=== Major highways ===
- U.S. Highway 56
- K-33

=== Airports ===
Palmyra Township contains one airport or landing strip, Vinland Valley Aerodrome.

== Places of interest ==
- Douglas State Fishing Lake, northeast of Baldwin City, has fishing, hunting and limited camping.
- Signal Oak, a hill north of Baldwin, where a tall oak tree once stood that was used to warn Lawrence about approaching guerrilla attacks during the American Civil War. The tree is gone but is clearly marked and has a scenic view of the Coal Creek, Wakarusa and Kaw Valleys.
- Spring Lake, a small fishing and recreation lake southeast of Baldwin offers scenic views, fishing and hiking trails.
- Ivan Boyd Prairie Preserve and Robert Pearson Memorial Park, located east of Baldwin, marks wagon ruts along the Santa Fe Trail and the Battle of Black Jack which some consider the first battle of the Civil War.
