= Kanwaka, Kansas =

- Unincorporated community
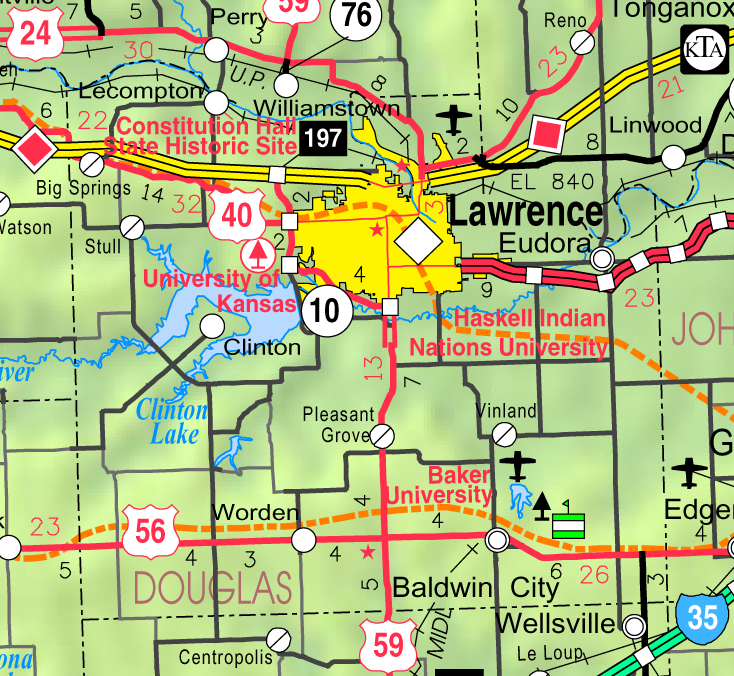
- KDOT map of Douglas County (legend)

- Location within Kansas Location within the United States
- Coordinates: 38°58′00″N 95°24′31″W
- Country: United States
- State: Kansas
- County: Douglas
- Founded: 1854
- Elevation: 1,066 ft (325 m)
- Time zone: UTC-6 (CST)
  - Summer (DST): UTC-5 (CDT)
- Area code: 785
- FIPS code: 20-36065
- GNIS ID: 484875

Kanwaka is an unincorporated community in Douglas County, Kansas, United States. It is located four miles west of Lawrence. The name of the community is a portmanteau of the Kansas and Wakarusa rivers.

== History ==
Kanwaka was first settled in 1854. Kanwaka had a post office from 1857 to 1870 and again from 1898 until 1900. The name Kanwaka is said to have been coined by Helen Heath.

== Geography ==
Kanwaka is located at the intersection of U.S. Highway 40 and Stull Road.

== Notable people ==
- Robert Buffum, arrived in Kanwaka in 1854
- John Allen Wakefield, settled in Kanwaka in 1854
- Samuel Walker, settled in Kanwaka in 1855
