= Grant Township, Douglas County, Kansas =

Grant Township
- Township
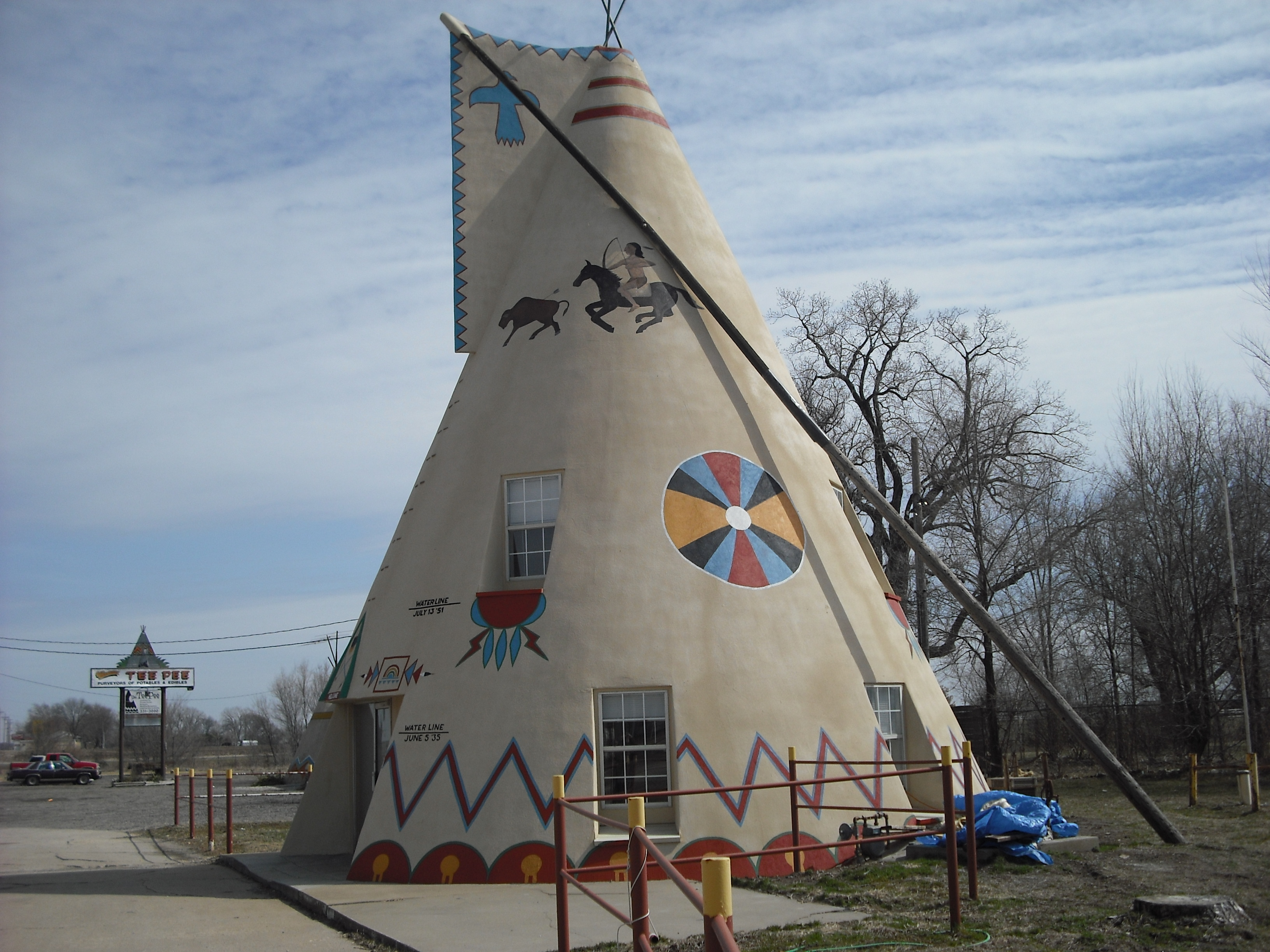
- A teepee at TeePee Junction north of Lawrence

- Location in Douglas County
- Coordinates: 39°01′20″N 095°14′01″W
- Country: United States
- State: Kansas
- County: Douglas

Area
  - Total: 16.56 sq mi (42.88 km^{2})
  - Land: 16.44 sq mi (42.57 km^{2})
  - Water: 0.12 sq mi (0.32 km^{2}) 0.75%
- Elevation: 830 ft (253 m)

Population (2020)
  - Total: 382
  - Density: 23.2/sq mi (8.97/km^{2})
- GNIS feature ID: 0478832

Grant Township is a township in Douglas County, Kansas, United States. As of the 2020 census, its population was 382.

== History ==
Grant Township was annexed from the extreme southern portion of Sarcoxie Township in Jefferson County in 1872. The largest town was called Jefferson until being renamed North Lawrence in 1870.

== Geography ==
Grant Township covers an area of 16.56 square miles (42.9 km^{2}) and contains no incorporated settlements. According to the USGS, it contains one cemetery, Maple Grove.

== Adjacent Townships ==
- Rural Township, Jefferson County (northwest)
- Sarcoxie Township, Jefferson County (north)
- Reno Township, Leavenworth County (east)
- Wakarusa Township, Douglas County (south)

== Communities ==
Although these towns may not be incorporated or populated, they are still placed on maps produced by the county.

- Midland, located at 39°01′46″N 95°14′31″W
- North Lawrence, located at 38°58′55″N 95°13′26″W

== Transportation ==
=== Major highways ===
- I-70, part of the Kansas Turnpike
- U.S. Highway 24
- U.S. Highway 40
- U.S. Highway 59
- K-32

== Places of interest ==
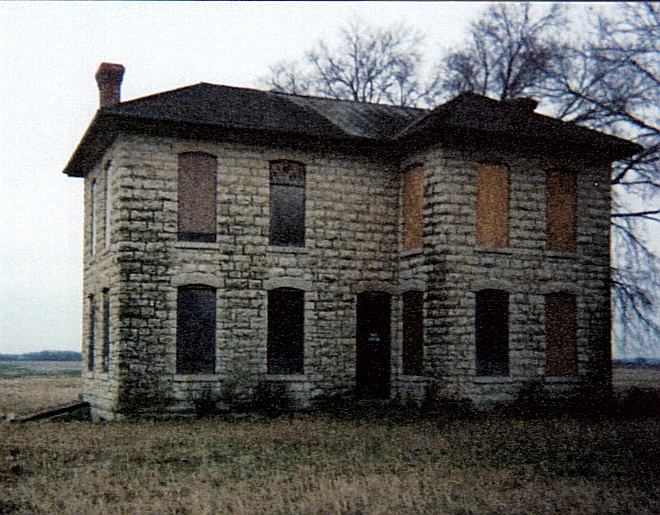
The Vermilya-Boener House in Grant Township. Listed on the National Register of Historic Places, the house is now considered an endangered site.

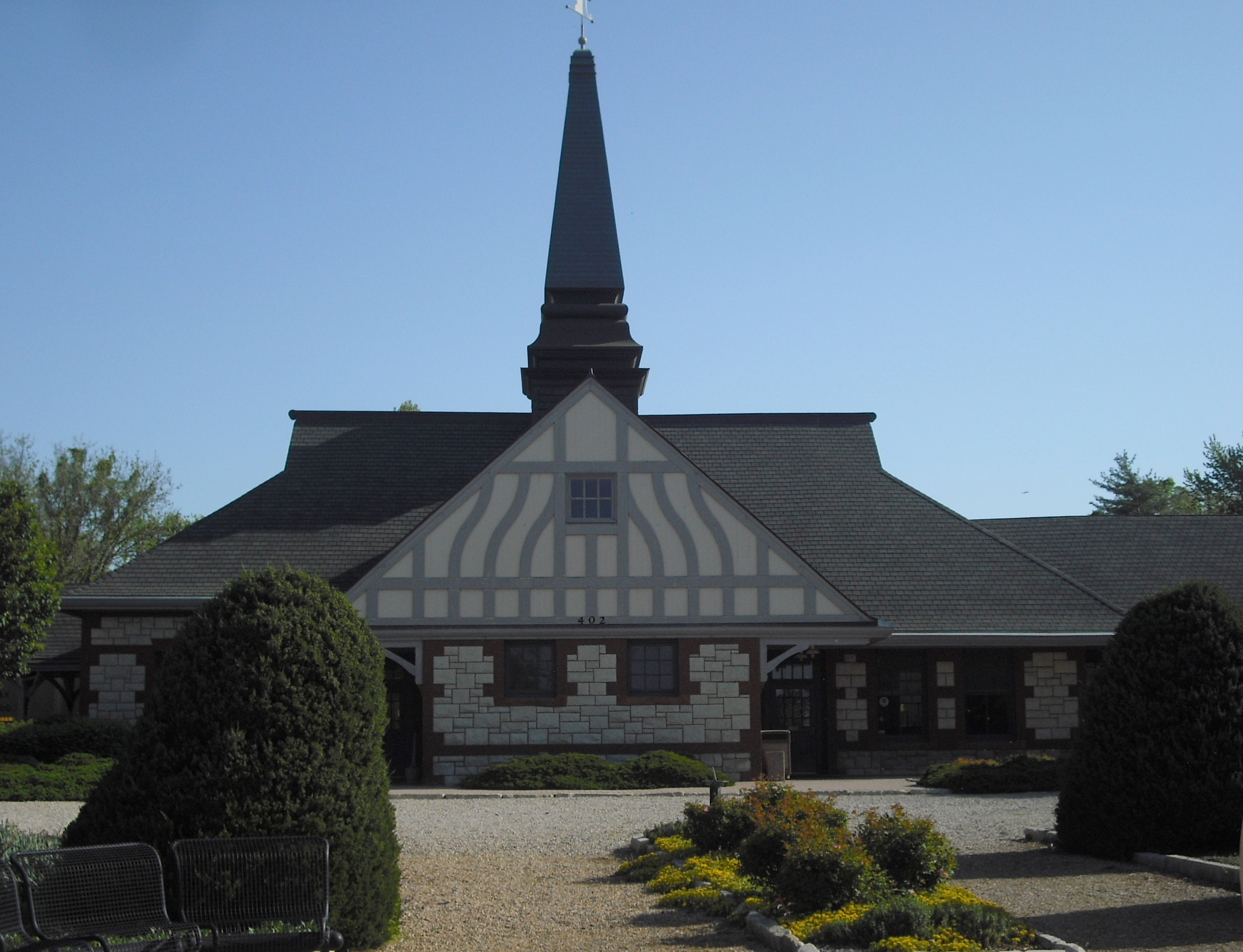
The Lawrence Visitors Center, formerly the Union Pacific Depot

- Located near Lyon and North 9th streets, the community of Bismarck Grove was located just outside North Lawrence and held fairs and chautauquas between 1878 and 1900.
- Riverfront Park is a park maintained by the Army Corps of Engineers that follows the Kansas River levee from Leavenworth County to Jefferson County.
- The Union Pacific Railroad Depot was designed by Henry Van Brunt and built in 1889. It was used until 1984, was saved from demolition and is now the Lawrence Visitors Information Center.
