= Louisiana (disambiguation) =

Louisiana is a southern state in the United States.

Louisiana may also refer to:

== North America ==
- Louisiana (New France), a historical North American region claimed by France, 1682–1763 and 1803
- Louisiana (New Spain), a historical North American region claimed by Spain, 1764–1803
- Louisiana Purchase, a vast area in North America bought by the United States in 1803
- District of Louisiana, a temporary U.S. governmental district, 1804–1805
- Louisiana Territory, a historic, organized territory of the United States, 1805–1812
- French Louisiana, two distinct places of North America.

== Other places ==
- La Luisiana, a municipality in Spain
- Louisiana, Kansas, a ghost town
- Louisiana, Missouri, a city
- Luisiana, Laguna, a municipality in the Philippines
- Louisiana road (Croatia), an old road in Croatia
- Luiziana, a city in Paraná, Brazil

== Entertainment ==
- "Louisiana 1927", a song by Randy Newman
- Louisiana, a song by Underworld, from the album Barking
- Louisiana (1919 film), a lost 1919 American silent comedy film
- Louisiana (1947 film), a movie starring Jimmie Davis, then governor of that state
- Louisiana (1984 film), a TV movie by Philippe de Broca, also known as Lousiane
- Louisiana, an 1880 novel by Frances Hodgson Burnett

== Ships ==
- USS Louisiana, five U.S. Navy ships have borne this name
- CSS Louisiana, an 1862 ironclad ship of the Confederate States Navy
- Louisiana (shipwreck), steamboat that sank during the Great Lakes Storm of 1913

== Other ==
- Louisiana Ragin' Cajuns, the athletic program of the University of Louisiana at Lafayette
- Louisiana Museum of Modern Art, near Copenhagen, Denmark

== See also ==
- University of Louisiana (disambiguation)
