= Stewart's Fort =

- Lawrence, Kansas

Site information
- Type: private free-state fort during the Bleeding Kansas era
- Controlled by: John E. Stewart

Location
- Coordinates: 38.9105°N 95.2187°W

Site history
- Built: possibly 1859
- In use: 1859 to ca. 1862
- Materials: possibly wood and stone

Garrison information
- Past commanders: John E. Stewart
- Garrison: Stewart and at times freed slaves

Rev. John E. Stewart, a free stater, moved about four miles southeast of Lawrence, Kansas, about 1859. Stewart made a land claim on the south side of the Wakarusa River, at a horseshoe bend. Here he built a fortress home, which became known as Stewart's Fort. Not much is known about the fort, other than it was surrounded by brush and was secluded and it had some sort of defensive walls surrounding it.

Stewart, sometimes known to his fellow free staters as the "Fighting Preacher," used his fort as a station on the Underground Railroad. Many freed slaves passed through on their journeys to northern locations out of harm's way. Kansas Territory then was a battleground between those desiring it to be a free state and those wanting it to embrace slavery and become aligned with the nation's south. Because of Stewart's work to free slaves, his involvement with stolen livestock being kept at his fort was overlooked.

William C. Quantrill befriended Stewart, although Stewart never completely trusted Quantrill. In summer 1860 a number of freed slaves were at Stewart's fort, waiting to travel further north and to safer territory. Quantrill discovered this and he and seven accomplices plotted to take the slaves, by force, if necessary and probably sell them or demand rewards before turning them over to their former owners. Quantrill remained in the background when the group arrived at Stewart's fort. Quantrill did this to keep his involvement in the plot from Stewart. The other seven demanded the surrender of the former slaves, which Stewart refused. Stewart had armed the slaves and a battle erupted, which lasted through the night. Only one former slave was captured and possibly several were wounded. Most or all left Stewart's Underground Railroad stop as scheduled and Stewart never discovered Quantrill's involvement in the scheme to retake the blacks.

It is unknown how long Stewart used his fortress home for defense or as an Underground Railroad station. He probably lived in it until at least 1862.
