= Lapeer =

Lapeer may refer to a location in the United States:

- Lapeer, Kansas
- Lapeer, Michigan
- Lapeer County, Michigan
- Lapeer Township, Michigan
- Lapeer, New York

== See also ==
- USS Lapeer (PC-1138)
