= Weaver, Kansas =

- Ghost town
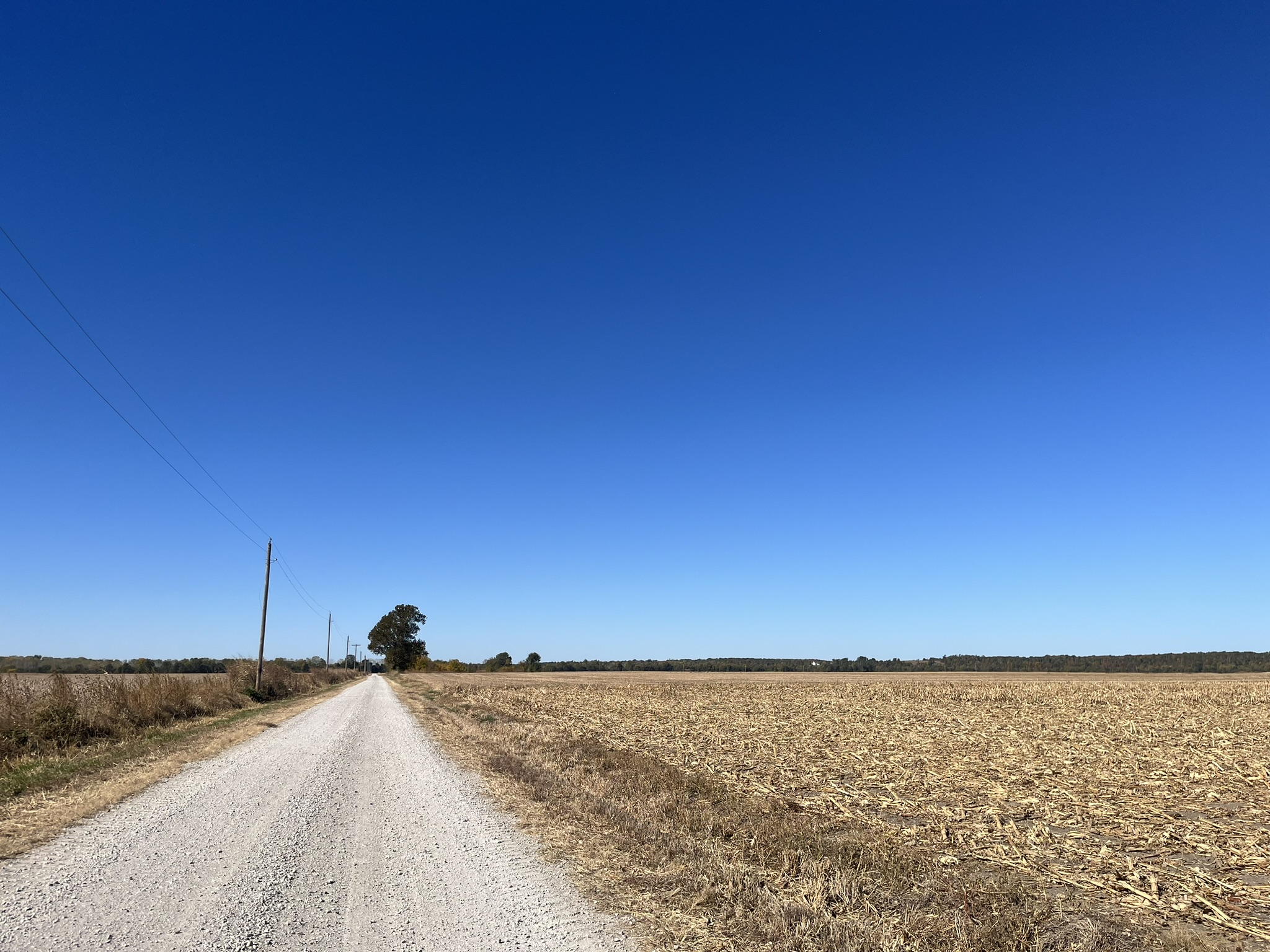
- N 1600 Rd in Weaver Bottoms

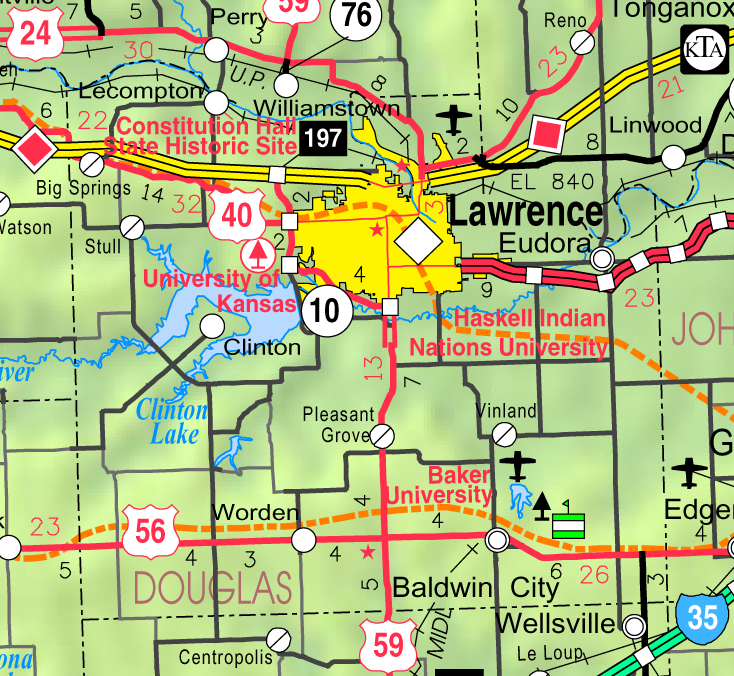
- KDOT map of Douglas County (legend)

- Location within Kansas Location within the United States
- Coordinates: 38°57′43″N 95°04′01″W
- Country: United States
- State: Kansas
- County: Douglas
- Founded: 1865
- Named for: Henry Weaver
- Elevation: 1,089 ft (332 m)

Population
  - Estimate: 0
- Time zone: UTC-6 (CST)
  - Summer (DST): UTC-5 (CDT)
- Area code: 785
- GNIS ID: 484879

Weaver is a ghost town in Douglas County, Kansas, United States. It is located one mile northeast of Eudora.

== History ==
The area was once owned by a group of Shawnee Native Americans. By 1865 several investors took ownership of the area before Henry Weaver obtained a large portion of the land. Henry and his wife, Nancy (Hill) came to the area from Pennsylvania along with their seven children. John F. Weaver, Henry's youngest son went on to own several businesses in the Weaver area including a general store, rock crushing business and a potato bucket manufacturing company.

A post office called Weaver was established in 1891, and remained in operation until 1903. The Weaver community was located close to the southern bank of the Kansas River. The area lies in a region called "Weaver Bottoms," which is in the Kansas River floodplain. Therefore, the community was the victim of frequent flooding. Floods in 1903 and 1908 significantly damaged the community. The Great Flood of 1951 destroyed every remnant of the community, and forced all residents to leave the community permanently. No trace of Weaver exists as of 2021.
