= Lawrence Police Department (Kansas) =

Municipal police department in Kansas, U.S.

- Abbreviation: LPD

Agency overview
- Formed: 1866
- Annual budget: $30,445,000 (2023 Adopted Budget)

Jurisdictional structure
- Operations jurisdiction: Lawrence, Kansas, United States
- Legal jurisdiction: City of Lawrence
- General nature: Local civilian police

Operational structure
- Agency executive: Rich Lockhart, Chief of Police

Website
- Lawrence Police Department

The Lawrence Police Department is the primarily law enforcement agency responsible for policing services in the city of Lawrence, Kansas, United States. Since its formation the LPD has become a professional police department with various subdivisions and has also seen moderation in recent years. The department currently has 138 commissioned officers and 41 civilians.

== History ==
The first building for the Lawrence Police Department was established in 1866, when the agency was founded. Around 1900 the department had a second location at the old city hall building.

Between 1910 and 1920, the LPD maintained two vehicles and had four sworn police officers. In 1936, new uniforms were acquired for LPD officers. In 1938 the department began the use of mobile radios and a base station were loaned to the department, who would go on to purchase them the next year. In 1959 a total of 22 officers were employed by the LPD.

During the 1960s the LPD was involved with anti-war protests due to the Vietnam War with US involvement and at some points all law enforcement within Douglas County, Kansas, cooperated to keep the peace.

Following the modernization of law enforcement in the early 1990s, the LPD adopted the SIG Sauer P226 as the sidearm. In 2017, LPD hired its first African American police chief since the 1800s, Gregory Burns Jr. Burns had come from the Louisville, Kentucky Police Department. However, in 2020 Burns had resigned as Chief following "internal issues" with the department in what he called a "mutual decision. The resignation of Burns also caused concern from local leaders and some activists in the area.

In May 2018, Officer Brindley Blood shot and wounded a driver, Akira Lewis, whom she pulled over following a struggle with him and another officer, in which she mistook her SIG Sauer P320 for her Taser. But following the incident the charge of Aggravated Battery was filed against Officer Blood, however, the charge was later dropped. In 2020, Lewis filed a lawsuit against Blood, however, his legal team was unable to locate her.

== Subdivisions ==
- Patrol
- Investigations
- Information Services
- Professional Standards (Internal Affairs, etc.)
- Tactical Operations (SWAT)

== Equipment ==
The LPD currently favors the Ford Explorer Police Interceptor Utility as the patrol vehicle of choice, which has generally helped phase out the Ford Crown Victoria Interceptors that were in service. The Dodge Durango Pursuit has also been adopted in recent years by the LPD.

LPD also maintains an armored vehicle to help with high-risk situations such as active shooters, barricaded suspects and other dangerous calls that call for a more specialized response.

The LPD currently issues officers the SIG Sauer P320 handgun chambered in 9x19mm which replaced the SIG Sauer P226 chambered in .40 S&W. Officers also have access to AR-15 Patrol Rifles, which is standard for most law enforcement agencies. In 2022, the department transitioned from lethal shotguns to less-lethal shotguns, the model being the Remington 870.
