= Simmons Point Station =

Coordinates: 38.783847°N 95.434518°W

- Way Station
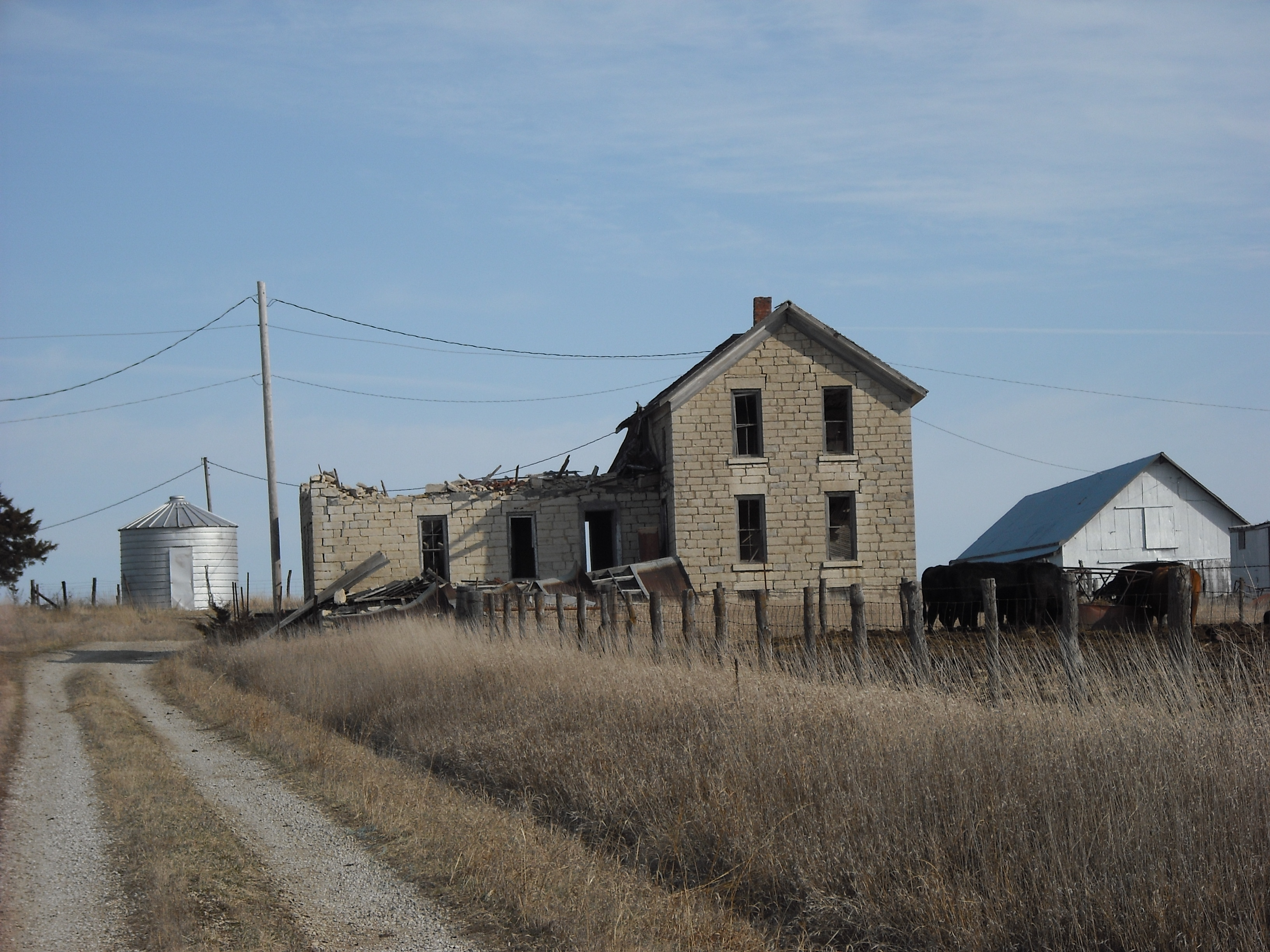
- The Simmons Point Station in 2009. Since then, the building has substantially deteriorated.

- Location within Kansas Location within the United States
- Country: United States
- State: Kansas
- County: Douglas
- Time zone: Central (CST)
- Area code: 785

Simmons Point Station is the name of a house near the unincorporated settlement of Globe in Marion Township, Douglas County, Kansas, United States. The building was constructed in the 1880s as a way station for travelers on the Santa Fe Trail, and it was run by Phillip and Elmira Dodder Simmons.

In 1995, the United States National Park Service certified the house as a historic site. However, no settlement in the area claimed the building, causing it to fall into disrepair. By 2006, it was in an advanced state of deterioration, and by 2024, the building had been razed to its foundation.
