= Media, Kansas =

- Ghost town
- Location within the state of Kansas Media (the United States)
- Coordinates: 38°46′20″N 95°12′08″W
- Country: United States
- State: Kansas
- County: Douglas
- Elevation: 1,056 ft (322 m)

Population
  - Total: 0
- Time zone: UTC-6 (CST)
  - Summer (DST): UTC-5 (CDT)
- Area code: 785
- GNIS ID: 482180

Media is a ghost town in Douglas County, Kansas, United States.

== History ==
The first settlement at Media was made in 1878. Media was located on the Kansas City, Lawrence & Southern Kansas Railroad. A post office was established in Media in 1878, and remained in operation until it was discontinued in 1903. Media was eventually absorbed into present-day Baldwin City.
