= Belvoir, Kansas =

- Ghost town
- Location within the state of Kansas Belvoir (the United States)
- Coordinates: 38°55′13″N 95°25′41″W
- Country: United States
- State: Kansas
- County: Douglas
- Elevation: 876 ft (267 m)

Population
  - Total: 0
- Time zone: UTC-6 (CST)
  - Summer (DST): UTC-5 (CDT)
- Area code: 785
- GNIS ID: 481830

Belvoir is a ghost town in Douglas County, Kansas, United States.

== History ==
The first settlement at Belvoir was made in the 1850s. A post office was established at Belvoir in 1869, and remained in operation until it was discontinued in 1903. The community was named after Belvoir, the plantation home of William Fairfax in Virginia.
