= Lapeer, Kansas =

- Ghost town
- Location within the state of Kansas Lapeer (the United States)
- Coordinates: 38°47′53″N 95°26′46″W
- Country: United States
- State: Kansas
- County: Douglas
- Elevation: 1,112 ft (339 m)

Population
  - Total: 0
- Time zone: UTC-6 (CST)
  - Summer (DST): UTC-5 (CDT)
- Area code: 785
- GNIS ID: 482174

Lapeer is a ghost town in Douglas County, Kansas, United States.

== History ==
Lapeer was founded in 1855 on the Santa Fe Trail route. The community was named after Lapeer, Michigan. The Lapeer post office closed in 1902.
