= Big Springs, Kansas =

- Unincorporated community
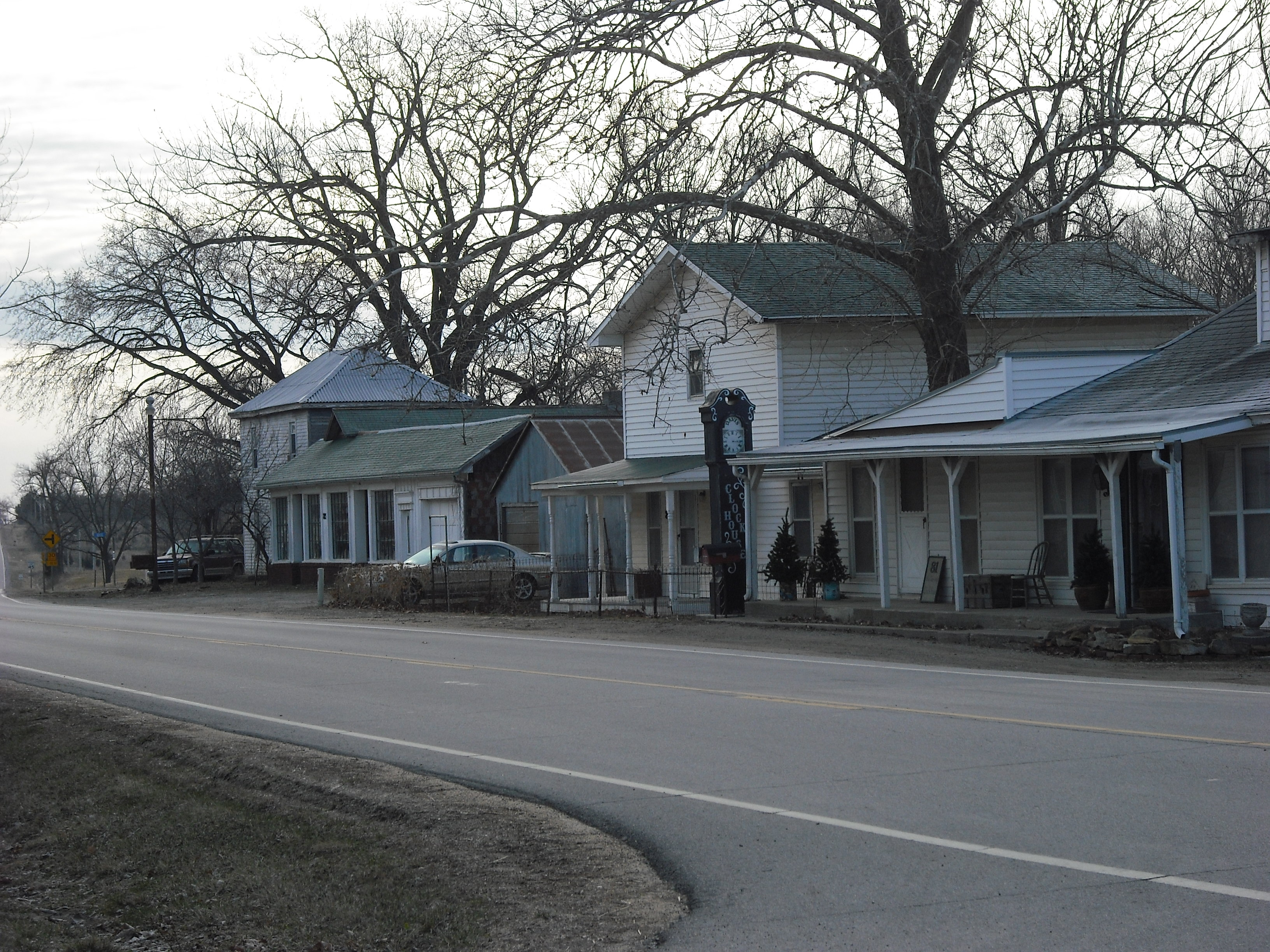
- Big Springs along Highway 40 (2008)

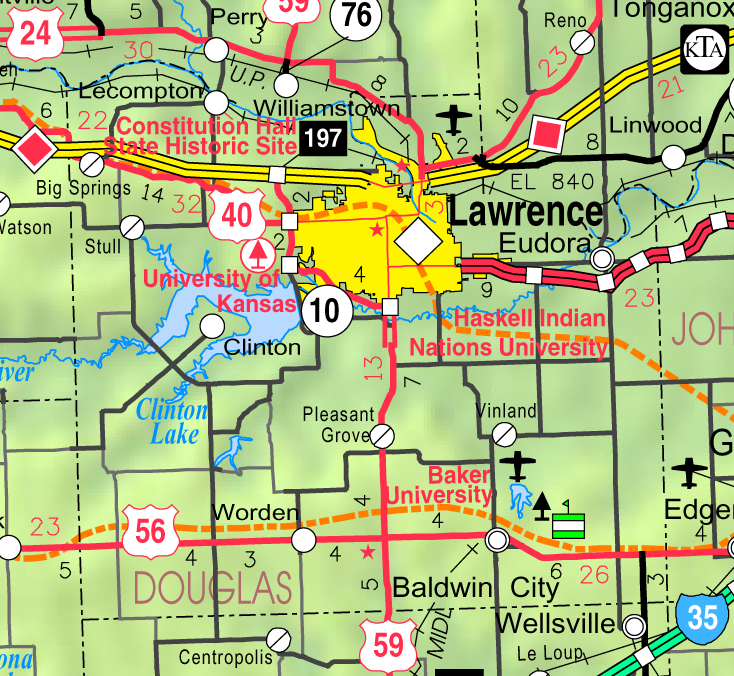
- KDOT map of Douglas County (legend)

- Location within Kansas Location within the United States
- Coordinates: 39°0′47″N 95°29′6″W
- Country: United States
- State: Kansas
- County: Douglas
- Named for: Nearby springs
- Elevation: 1,102 ft (336 m)
- Time zone: UTC-6 (CST)
  - Summer (DST): UTC-5 (CDT)
- Area code: 785
- FIPS code: 20-06750
- GNIS ID: 484942

Big Springs is an unincorporated community in northwestern Douglas County, Kansas, United States.

== History ==
The first settlement at Big Springs was made in the fall of 1854. The town was founded by William Harper and John Chamberlain but had always been a popular watering hole along the Oregon Trail. It was named from the mineral springs nearby. On September 5, 1855, Big Springs was home to a free-state convention in which determined men vowed to give their lives to defend their homes from border ruffians from Missouri. The first sermon was preached in 1855 by Reverend W.A. Cardwell in the log home of Ephraim Banning. The first church was built a year later. Also in 1856, the first post office was established, as well as the first schooling took place then in the town hall. The post office was discontinued in 1903. The population did not grow, but hovered around 40 people, as there was no railroad running through the town.

According to the Lawrence Journal-World, Big Springs was the location of T. J. Custard's birth, making him the first American citizen to be born in Douglas County.

Today it has a water tower, tool shop, church and a fire station that is part of the Lecompton Township Fire Dist. 1. Its mailing address is Lecompton.

In 2010, a building on the east side of town caught fire, leaving a restricted area of charred rubble.

== Education ==
The community is part of USD 450 Shawnee Heights School District in Tecumseh.

== Infrastructure ==
US Highway 40 passes through the community.
