= Grover, Kansas =

- Unincorporated community
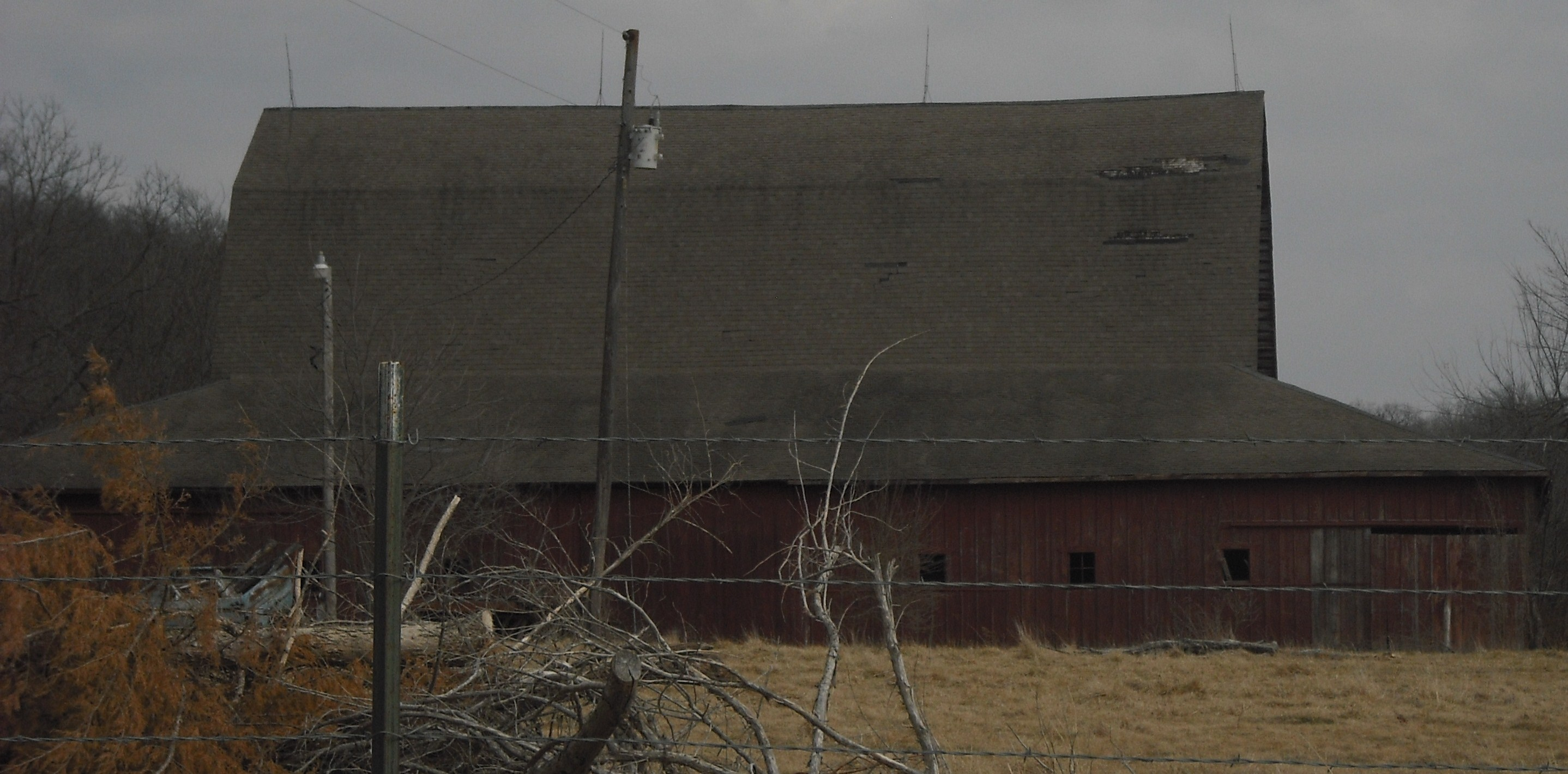
- An old barn south of Grover (2011)

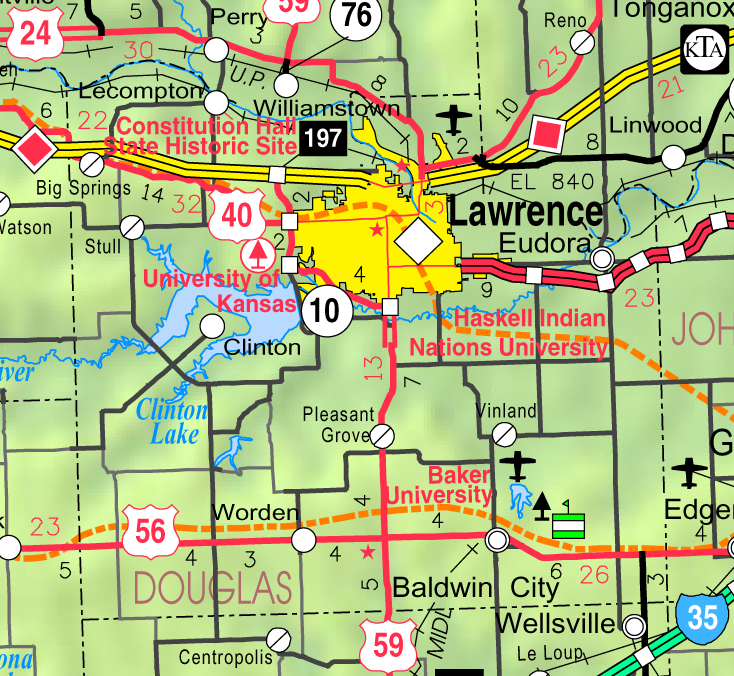
- KDOT map of Douglas County (legend)

- Location within Kansas Location within the United States
- Coordinates: 39°03′35″N 95°27′37″W
- Country: United States
- State: Kansas
- County: Douglas
- Elevation: 853 ft (260 m)
- Time zone: UTC-6 (CST)
  - Summer (DST): UTC-5 (CDT)
- Area code: 785
- FIPS code: 20-29160
- GNIS ID: 484867

Grover is an unincorporated community in Douglas County, Kansas, United States. It is located four miles west of Lecompton and six miles east of Tecumseh.

== History ==
Grover had a post office from 1886 to 1895 and again from 1897 to 1899.
