= Clinton Lake (Kansas) =

Artificial lake in Kansas, U.S.

- Clinton Lake

- Location within Kansas Location within the United States

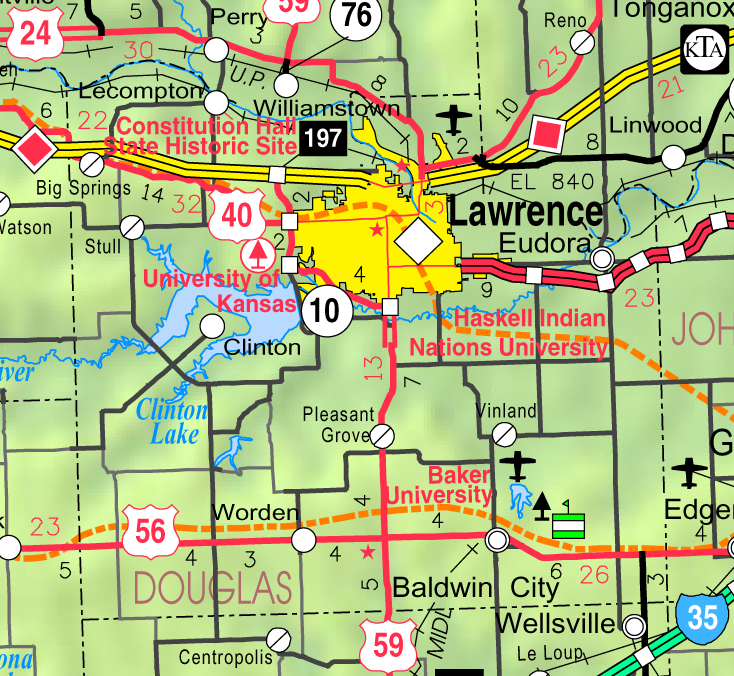
- KDOT map of Douglas County (legend)
- Location: Douglas County, Kansas
- Coordinates: 38°53′51″N 95°23′18″W
- Type: Reservoir
- Primary inflows: Wakarusa River, Rock Creek, Deer Creek
- Primary outflows: Wakarusa River
- Catchment area: 367 sq mi (950 km^{2})
- Basin countries: United States
- Managing agency: U.S. Army Corps of Engineers
- Built: 1975
- Max. length: 9,550 ft (2,910 m)
- Max. width: 940 ft (290 m)
- Surface area: 7,000 acres (28 km^{2})
- Average depth: 7 ft (2.1 m)
- Max. depth: 55 ft (17 m)
- Water volume: 110,400 acre⋅ft (0.1362 km^{3})
- Shore length^{1}: 85 miles (137 km)
- Surface elevation: 875.5 ft (266.9 m)
- Settlements: Lawrence, Kansas
- ^{1} Shore length is not a well-defined measure.

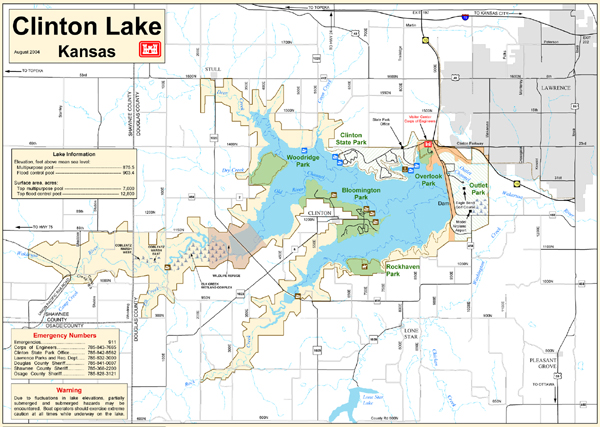
USACE area map

Clinton Lake is a reservoir on the southwestern edge of Lawrence, Kansas. The lake was created by the construction of the Clinton Dam, and the 35 square miles (91 km^{2}) of land and water is maintained by the U.S. Army Corps of Engineers.

== History ==
The Wakarusa Valley has had a history of violent floods before the construction of Clinton Lake. Previous floods had devastated the former towns of Belvoir, Bloomington and Sigil numerous times. With the construction of the lake, several towns were demolished including Sigil, Belvoir, and Bloomington, and Richland.

Construction of the dam and lake was authorized by the Flood Control Act of 1962 (Public Law 87-874), and funds were allocated for the project in 1971. Construction began in 1972, and the dam was completed in 1975. Impoundment began on November 30, 1977, yet the conservation pool was reached in 1980. Filling the reservoir slowly helped create a more hospitable environment for fish by allowing the native grass to remain on most of the upper lake-bed. In April 1981, the lake began multipurpose operations including flood control, water supply, and recreation. The Army Corps of Engineers currently manages Clinton Lake and 15,000 acres of land around the lake in coordination with the Kansas Department of Wildlife, Parks, and Tourism.

== Hydrology ==
Clinton Lake is formed mainly by the Wakarusa River coming east from Shawnee County. The Wakarusa River flows through the Clinton Dam and continues east south of Lawrence to the Kansas River near Eudora. Main tributaries include Deer Creek, Rock Creek, Washington Creek, Dry Creek, Coon Creek and Camp Creek.

Settlements along or near Clinton Lake include Clinton, Stull and Lawrence.

== Natural history ==
The woods surrounding the lake are abundant with white tail deer, quail, wild turkey, doves, rabbits, and squirrels. Bald eagles, great blue heron, gulls, cormorants, and various types of migratory birds, including American white pelicans and Canada geese, can be seen above and around the lake at different times of the year. Clinton Lake is also well-stocked with fish, including blue catfish, smallmouth bass, and channel catfish. Invasive zebra mussels are also present.

== Economy ==
Clinton Lake is the source of water for over 100,000 people in northeastern Kansas, making it the most relied on reservoir in the state. The lake also serves as a popular recreational area with four parks managed by the Army Corps of Engineers, and one park managed by the city of Lawrence. The lake offers opportunities for boating, fishing and other water sports. The surrounding land, part of which is Clinton State Park, allows access to mountain biking trails, camping, hiking, three disc golf courses, an off-leash dog park, horseback riding, geocaching, hunting, picnicking and wildlife viewing.

The Clinton Lake Museum is located near the town of Clinton in an old milk shed that was once part of the town of Bloomington.

The Wakarusa Music and Camping Festival was held annually in June from 2004 through 2008 and featured a variety of music from bluegrass to hip hop.

== Protection ==
In 2002 the Kaw Valley Heritage Alliance, a water quality advocacy group, published a Watershed Restoration And Protection Strategy (WRAPS) for the Upper Wakarusa watershed. Chief concerns were degrading lake conditions and increasing water supply needs. The WRAPS provided a structure for building cross-watershed to regional, grassroots to multi-agency stakeholder cooperation. A formal Wakarusa WRAPS leadership team was chartered in 2007.

== See also ==
- List of Kansas state parks
- List of lakes, reservoirs, and dams in Kansas
- List of rivers of Kansas
