= Sibleyville, Kansas =

- Unincorporated community
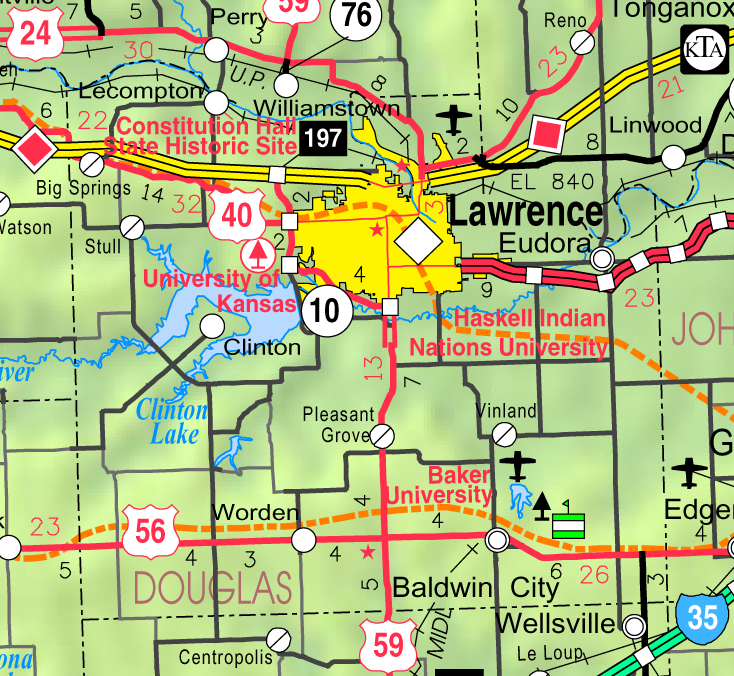
- KDOT map of Douglas County (legend)

- Location within Kansas Location within the United States
- Coordinates: 38°53′03″N 95°11′44″W
- Country: United States
- State: Kansas
- County: Douglas
- Elevation: 824 ft (251 m)
- Time zone: UTC-6 (CST)
  - Summer (DST): UTC-5 (CDT)
- Area code: 785
- FIPS code: 20-65435
- GNIS ID: 484876

Sibleyville is an unincorporated community in Douglas County, Kansas, United States. It is located five miles southeast of Lawrence. It was at the intersection of County Road 458 and the Leavenworth, Lawrence and Fort Gibson railroad tracks although the town never had more than a dozen houses. Little remained of the town by the 1960s.
