= Globe, Kansas =

- Unincorporated community
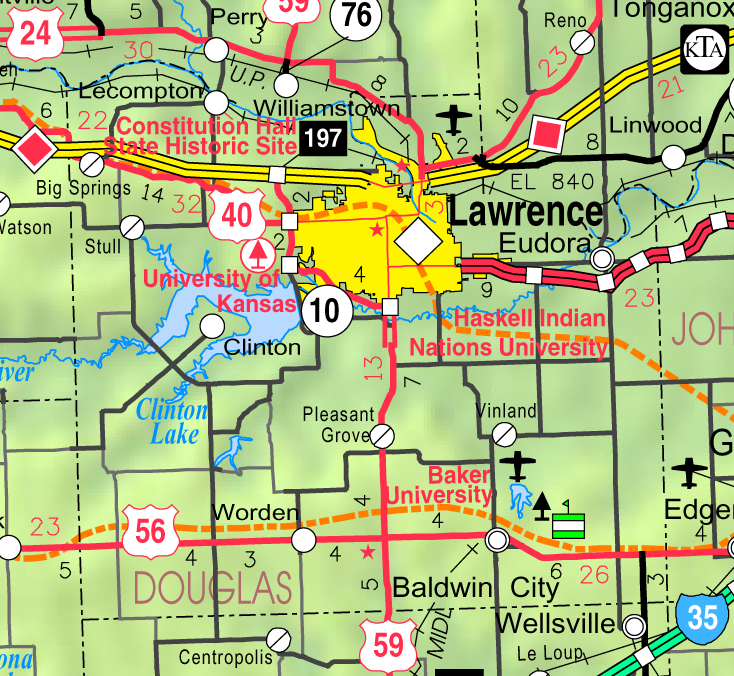
- KDOT map of Douglas County (legend)

- Location within Kansas Location within the United States
- Coordinates: 38°46′56″N 95°23′59″W
- Country: United States
- State: Kansas
- County: Douglas
- Township: Marion
- Elevation: 1,056 ft (322 m)
- Time zone: UTC-6 (CST)
  - Summer (DST): UTC-5 (CDT)
- Area code: 785
- FIPS code: 20-26710
- GNIS ID: 484892

Globe is an unincorporated community in Douglas County, Kansas, United States. It is located along U.S. Highway 56 in Marion Township. To the west of Globe is the Simmons Point Station.

== History ==
Founded in 1857–58 along the Santa Fe Trail, Globe was originally known as Marion (named after the Revolutionary War general Francis Marion). The small hamlet had an initial population of 11 people. According to Alfred Theodore Andreas's tome History of the State of Kansas (1883), "The improvements made by the town company were few – a town well was dug, a blacksmith shop erected, a store opened by D. Hubbard, and a few dwelling houses built."

On May 8, 1863, a bushwhacker posse led by Dick Yeager stormed through Marion and shot Hubbard in the lungs. He survived the attack, but his house was robbed. (Yeager would serve under William Quantrill a few months later during the infamous Lawrence massacre.)

In 1865, the Union Pacific Railway diverted traffic from the Santa Fe trail, causing the town's population to dwindle. In 1881, the small town's name was changed to Globe. The Marion/Globe post office, opened in 1858, closed in 1867, was reestablished in 1870, closed again in 1894, reopened in 1895, and closed permanently in 1900.

== See also ==
- Marion, Kansas
