= Clearfield, Kansas =

- Unincorporated community
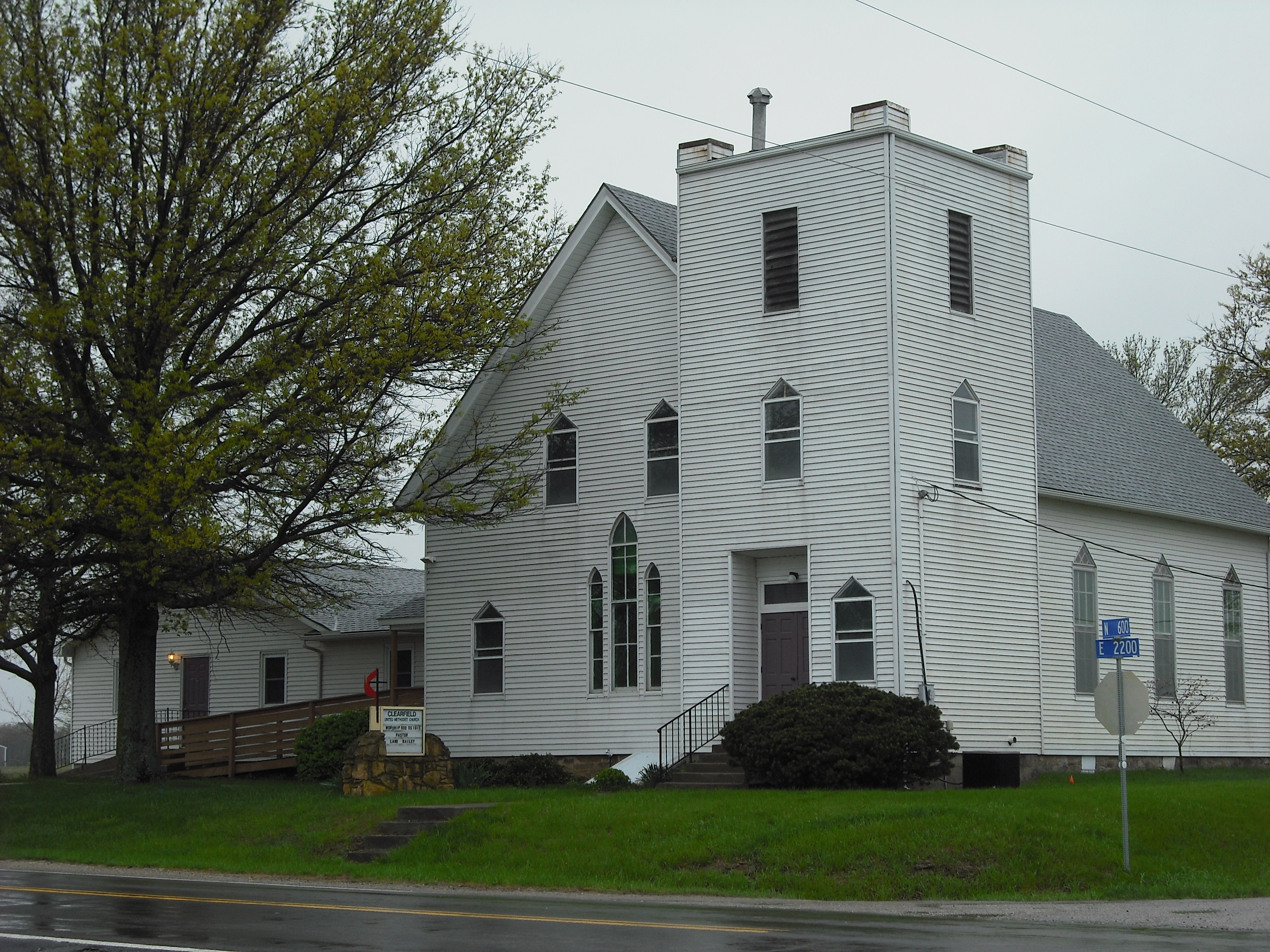
- Clearfield United Methodist Church (2011)

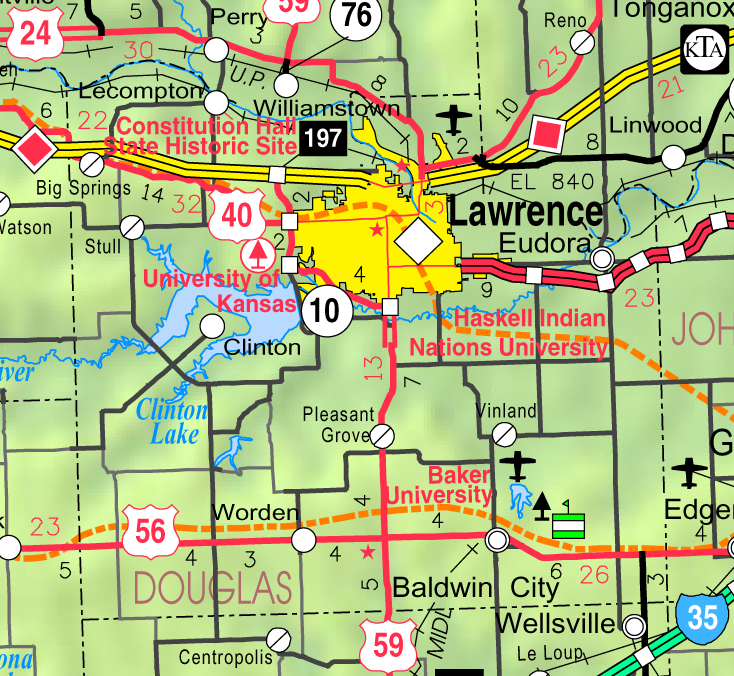
- KDOT map of Douglas County (legend)

- Location within Kansas Location within the United States
- Coordinates: 38°49′34″N 95°05′37″W
- Country: United States
- State: Kansas
- County: Douglas
- Elevation: 1,001 ft (305 m)
- Time zone: UTC-6 (CST)
  - Summer (DST): UTC-5 (CDT)
- Area code: 785
- FIPS code: 20-13850
- GNIS ID: 484894

Clearfield is an unincorporated community in Douglas County, Kansas, United States, and is located northeast of Baldwin City at the intersection of E 2200 and N 600 roads.

== History ==
A post office was opened in Clearfield in 1885, and remained in operation until it was discontinued in 1900.
