= Worden, Kansas =

Unincorporated community in Douglas County, Kansas

- Unincorporated community
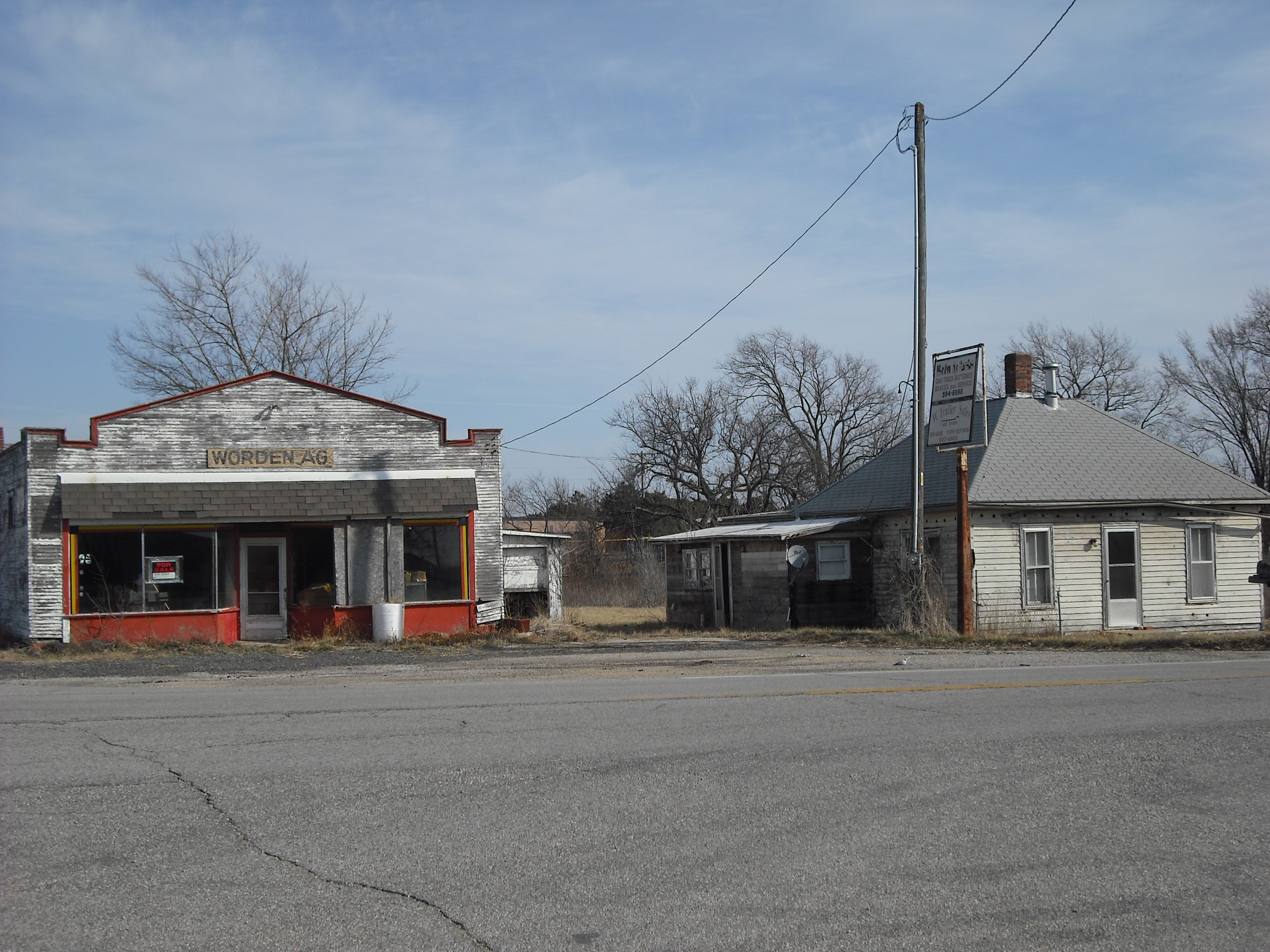
- Worden (2008)

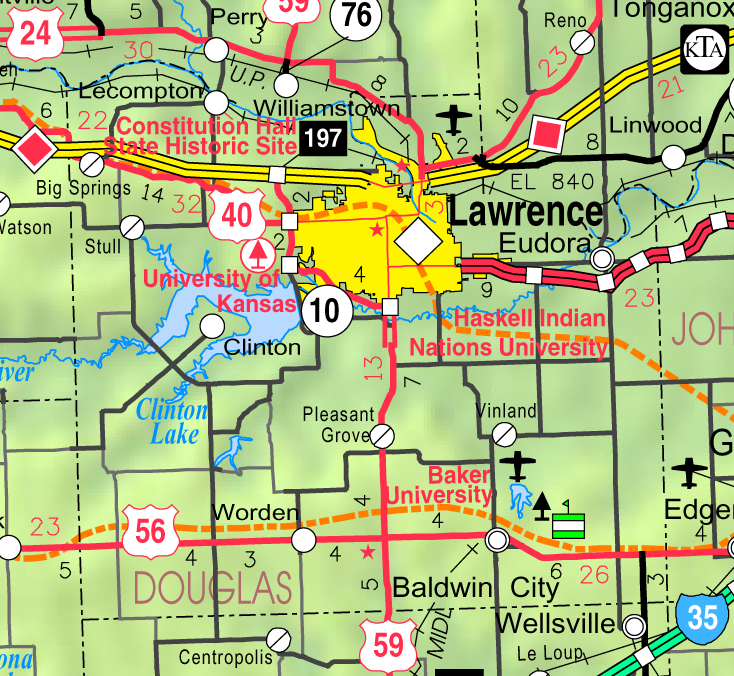
- KDOT map of Douglas County (legend)

- Location within Kansas Location within the United States
- Coordinates: 38°46′56″N 95°20′04″W
- Country: United States
- State: Kansas
- County: Douglas
- Elevation: 1,089 ft (332 m)
- Time zone: UTC-6 (CST)
  - Summer (DST): UTC-5 (CDT)
- Area code: 785
- FIPS code: 20-80475
- GNIS ID: 479499

Worden is an unincorporated community in Douglas County, Kansas, United States. It is located seven miles west of Baldwin City and nine miles east of Overbrook along U.S. Highway 56.

== History ==
Worden had a post office from 1884 until 1904.

The abandoned SM-65 Atlas-E missile site 548–2 is located roughly 1.9 miles southwest of Worden.

== Education ==
The community is served by Baldwin City USD 348 public school district.

On December 13, 2010, the Board of Education voted to close Vinland Elementary in Vinland and Marion Springs Elementary in Worden by a 5–2 vote.
