= Louisiana, Kansas =

Ghost town in Douglas County, Kansas

Coordinates: 38.80417°N 95.20997°W

Louisiana (also known as Brooklyn and Salem) is a ghost town in Douglas County, Kansas, United States.

== History ==
Louisiana was founded in 1855; the small town was located along the Santa Fe Trail and hosted a number of amenities for travelers, including an inn, a saloon, a stable, and a store. A post office was established at Louisiana in 1856, and discontinued in 1857. After William Quantrill's Raiders destroyed nearby Lawrence on August 21, 1863, they rode through Louisiana and burned the town to the ground, sparing only the saloon. The town disappeared soon after.

== See also ==
- List of ghost towns in Kansas
