= Clinton State Park =

State park located in Kansas

- Location within Kansas Location within the United States
- Interactive map of Clinton State Park
- Location: Lawrence, Kansas, United States
- Coordinates: 38°56′02″N 95°19′46″W
- Area: 1,785 acres (722 ha)
- Elevation: 889 ft (271 m)
- Established: 1975
- Administrator: Kansas Department of Wildlife and Parks
- Visitors: 643,176 (in 2022)
- Website: Official website
- Kansas State Parks

Clinton State Park is a 1,500-acre (610 ha) public recreation area located on the north shore of Clinton Lake at the western edge of Lawrence, Kansas, United States. An extensive hiking/biking trail system make this park and adjacent 9,200-acre (3,700 ha) wildlife area an attractive destination for outdoors enthusiasts including hikers, nature photographers, mountain bicyclists, wildflower enthusiasts, wildlife observers, and cross-country skiers. The park is the former home of the Wakarusa Music and Camping Festival and the Ironman Kansas 70.3 triathlon.

== See also ==
- List of lakes, reservoirs, and dams in Kansas
- List of rivers of Kansas
