= Lake View, Kansas =

- Unincorporated community
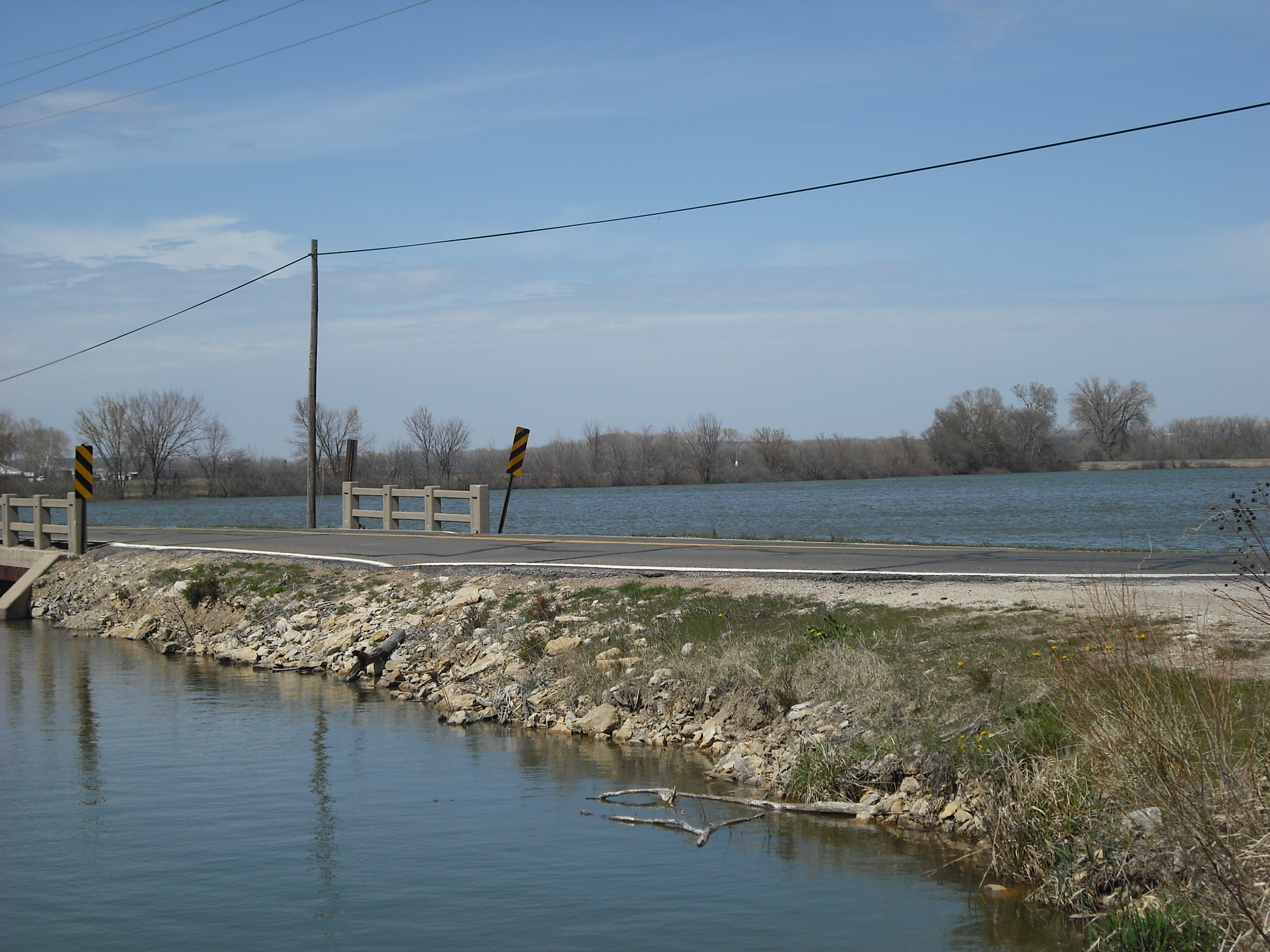
- Lakeview Lake (2009)

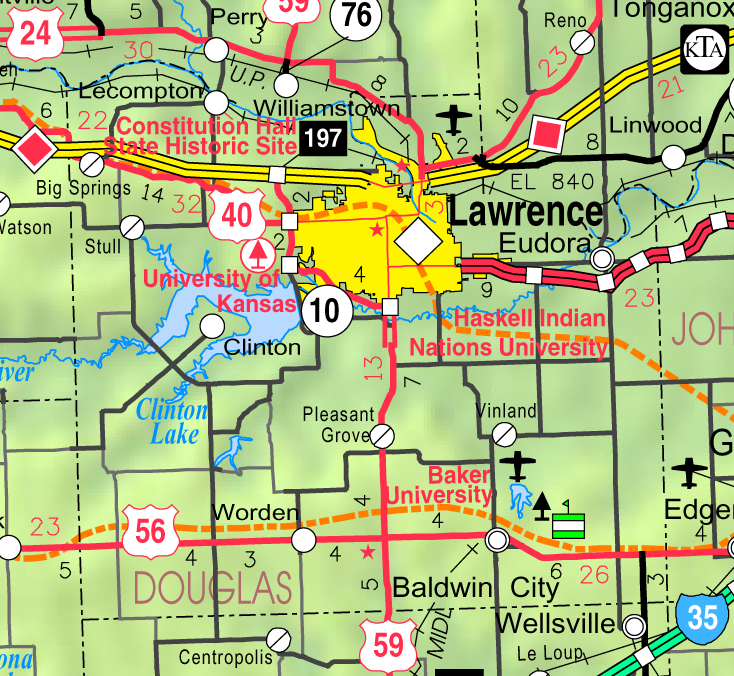
- KDOT map of Douglas County (legend)

- Location within Kansas Location within the United States
- Coordinates: 39°01′02″N 95°17′33″W
- Country: United States
- State: Kansas
- County: Douglas
- Founded: 1892
- Time zone: UTC-6 (CST)
  - Summer (DST): UTC-5 (CDT)
- Area code: 785
- GNIS ID: 478818

Lake View is an unincorporated community in Douglas County, Kansas, United States. It is located one mile north of Lawrence.

== History ==
Lake View was established in 1892 as a lake side resort and was in use until the 1930s. The Lake View club continues to maintain the oxbow lake.

A post office was opened in Lake View (but spelled Lakeview) in 1898, and remained in operation until it was discontinued in 1914.

Lake View was a station on the Atchison, Topeka and Santa Fe Railway.
