= Midland, Kansas =

- Unincorporated community
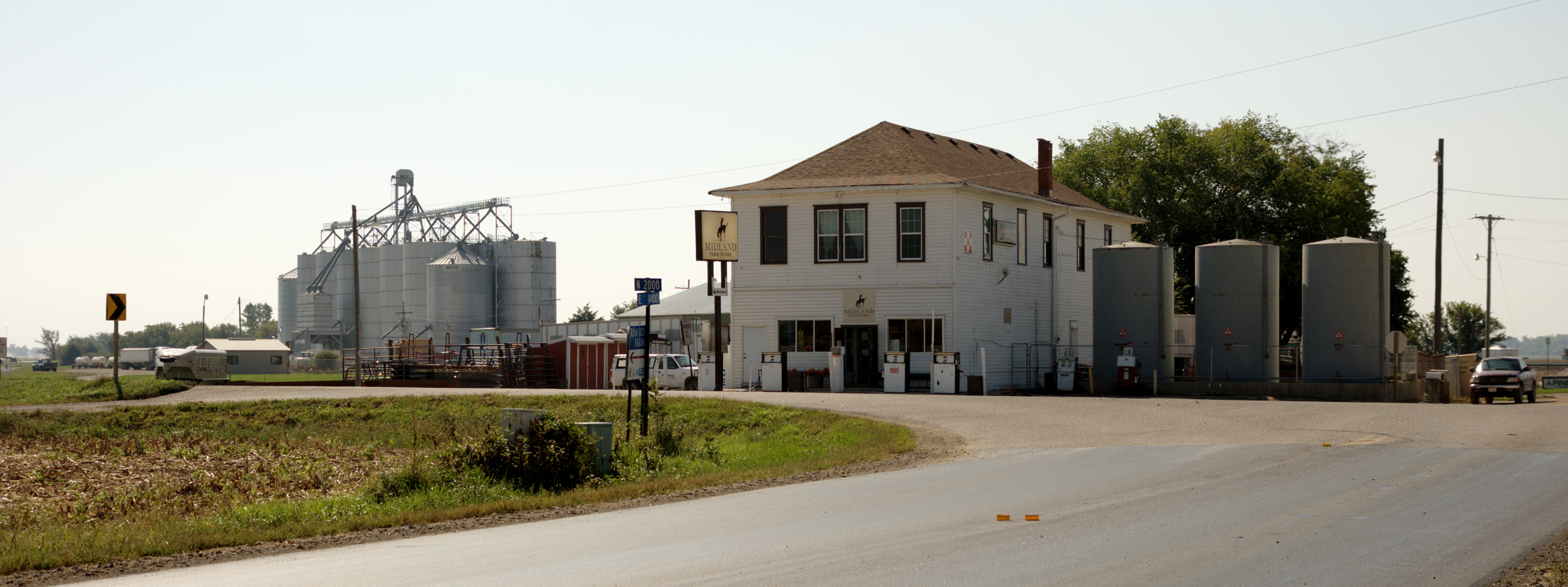
- Grain elevator and Midland Farm Store (2014)

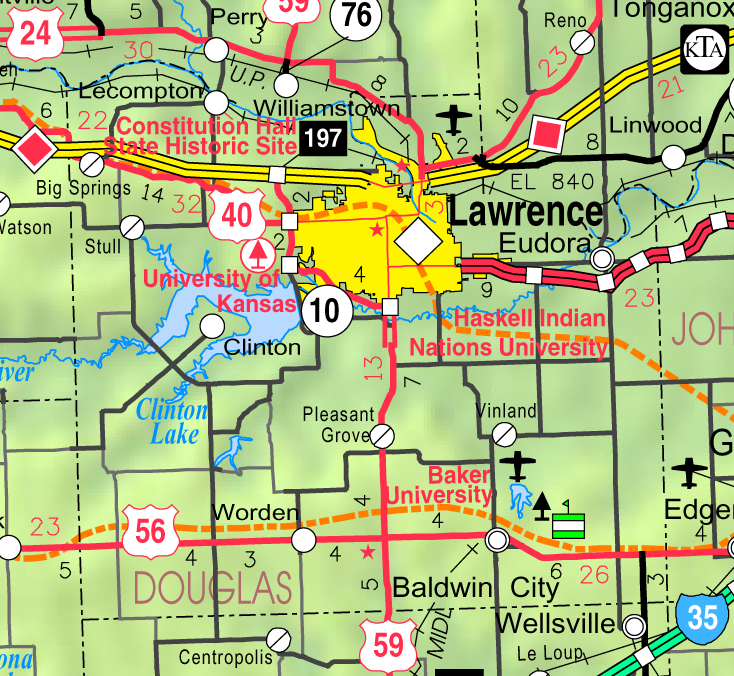
- KDOT map of Douglas County (legend)

- Location within Kansas Location within the United States
- Coordinates: 39°01′42″N 95°14′32″W
- Country: United States
- State: Kansas
- County: Douglas
- Elevation: 840 ft (260 m)
- Time zone: UTC-6 (CST)
  - Summer (DST): UTC-5 (CDT)
- Area code: 785
- FIPS code: 20-46275
- GNIS ID: 484869

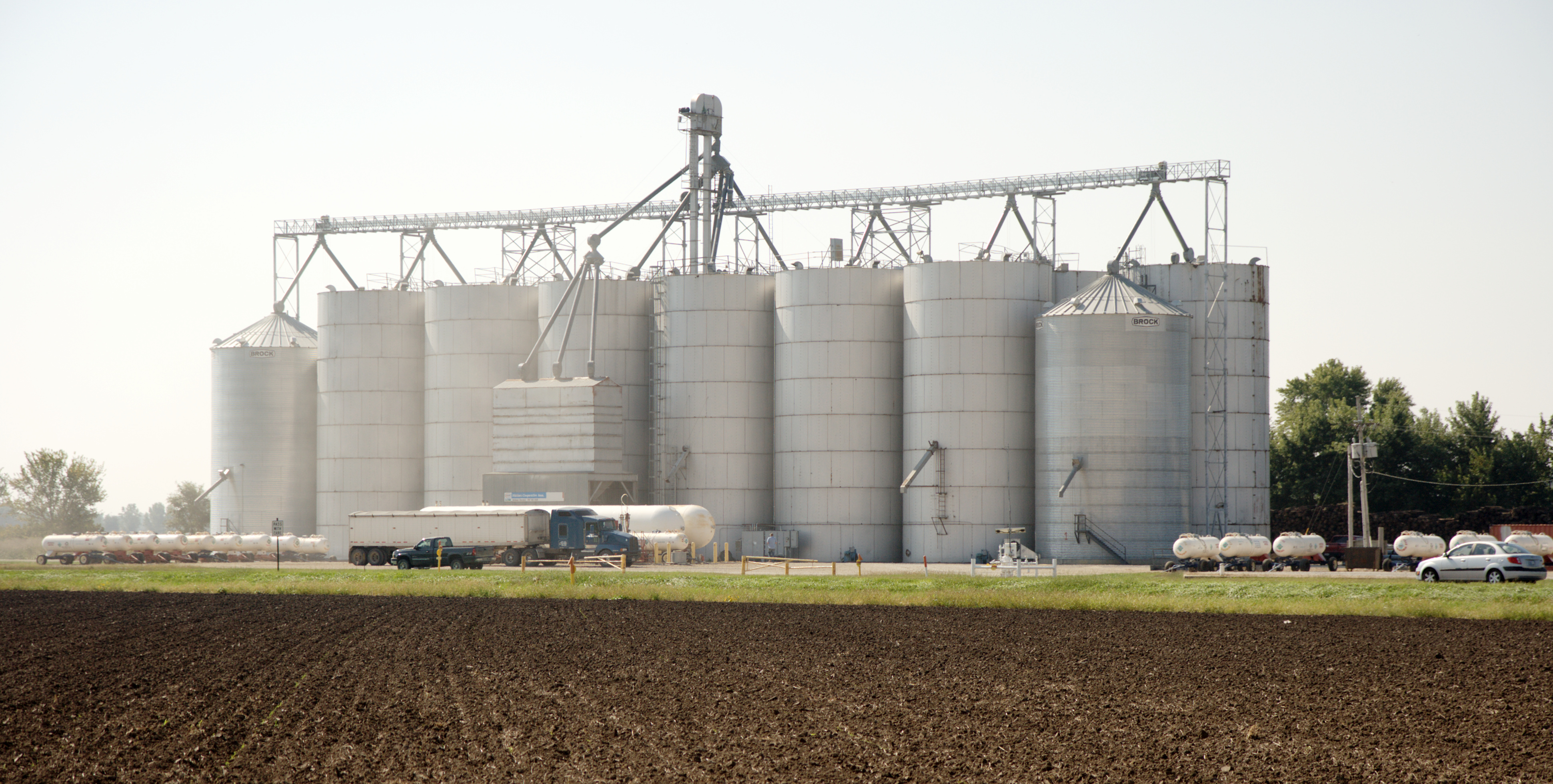
Grain elevator (2014)

Midland is an unincorporated community in Douglas County, Kansas, United States. It is located two miles north of the city of Lawrence.

== Geography ==
The climate in this area is characterized by hot, humid summers and generally mild to cool winters. According to the Köppen Climate Classification system, Midland has a humid subtropical climate, abbreviated "Cfa" on climate maps.
