= Douglas County, Kansas =

County in Kansas, United States

- County
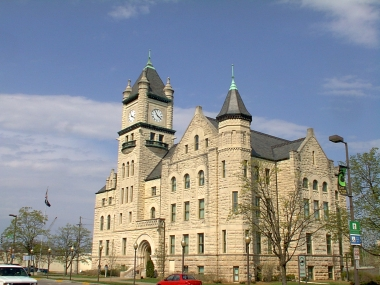
- Douglas County Courthouse in Lawrence

- Logo

- Location within the U.S. state of Kansas
- Country: United States
- State: Kansas
- Founded: August 25, 1855
- Named for: Stephen Douglas
- Seat: Lawrence
- Largest city: Lawrence

Area
  - Total: 475 sq mi (1,230 km^{2})
  - Land: 456 sq mi (1,180 km^{2})
  - Water: 19 sq mi (49 km^{2}) 4.0%

Population (2020)
  - Total: 118,785
  - Estimate (2025): 120,920 ▲
  - Density: 260.5/sq mi (100.6/km^{2})
- Time zone: UTC−6 (Central)
  - Summer (DST): UTC−5 (CDT)
- Area code: 785
- Congressional districts: 1st, 2nd
- Website: dgcoks.gov

Douglas County is a county located in the U.S. state of Kansas. Its county seat and most populous city is Lawrence. As of the 2020 census, the county population was 118,785, making it the fifth-most populous county in Kansas. The county was named after Stephen Douglas, a U.S. Senator from Illinois and advocate for the popular sovereignty choice in the Kansas slavery debate.

Douglas County comprises the Lawrence, KS Metropolitan Statistical Area, which is also included in the Kansas City-Overland Park-Kansas City, MO-KS Combined Statistical Area.

== History ==
=== Early history ===
For millennia, the Great Plains of North America was inhabited by nomadic Native Americans. From the 16th century to 18th century, the Kingdom of France claimed ownership of large parts of North America. In 1762, after the French and Indian War, France secretly ceded New France to Spain, per the Treaty of Fontainebleau. In 1802, Spain returned most of the land to France via the Third Treaty of San Ildefonso, although the former country kept title to about 7,500 square miles. In 1803, most of the land for modern day Kansas was acquired by the United States from France as part of the 828,000 square mile Louisiana Purchase for 2.83 cents per acre.

=== 19th century ===
In 1854, the Kansas Territory was organized, then in 1861 Kansas became the 34th U.S. state. In 1855, Douglas County was established. Douglas County was opened for settlement on May 15, 1854, and was named for Stephen A. Douglas, a senator from Illinois. The county was practically at the center of the Bleeding Kansas years as leaders in Lecompton (the territorial capital) wanted Kansas to be a slave state, whereas leaders in Lawrence wanted Kansas to be a free state. The pro- and anti-slavery settlers held great animosity towards one another, leading to many events, such as the drafting of the Lecompton Constitution (which would have admitted Kansas into the Union as a slave state), the Wakarusa War (1855), the Sack of Lawrence (1856), Battle of Black Jack (1856), and the Lawrence Massacre (1863).

The first railroad in Douglas County, the Kansas Pacific, was built through that territory in 1864.

== Geography ==
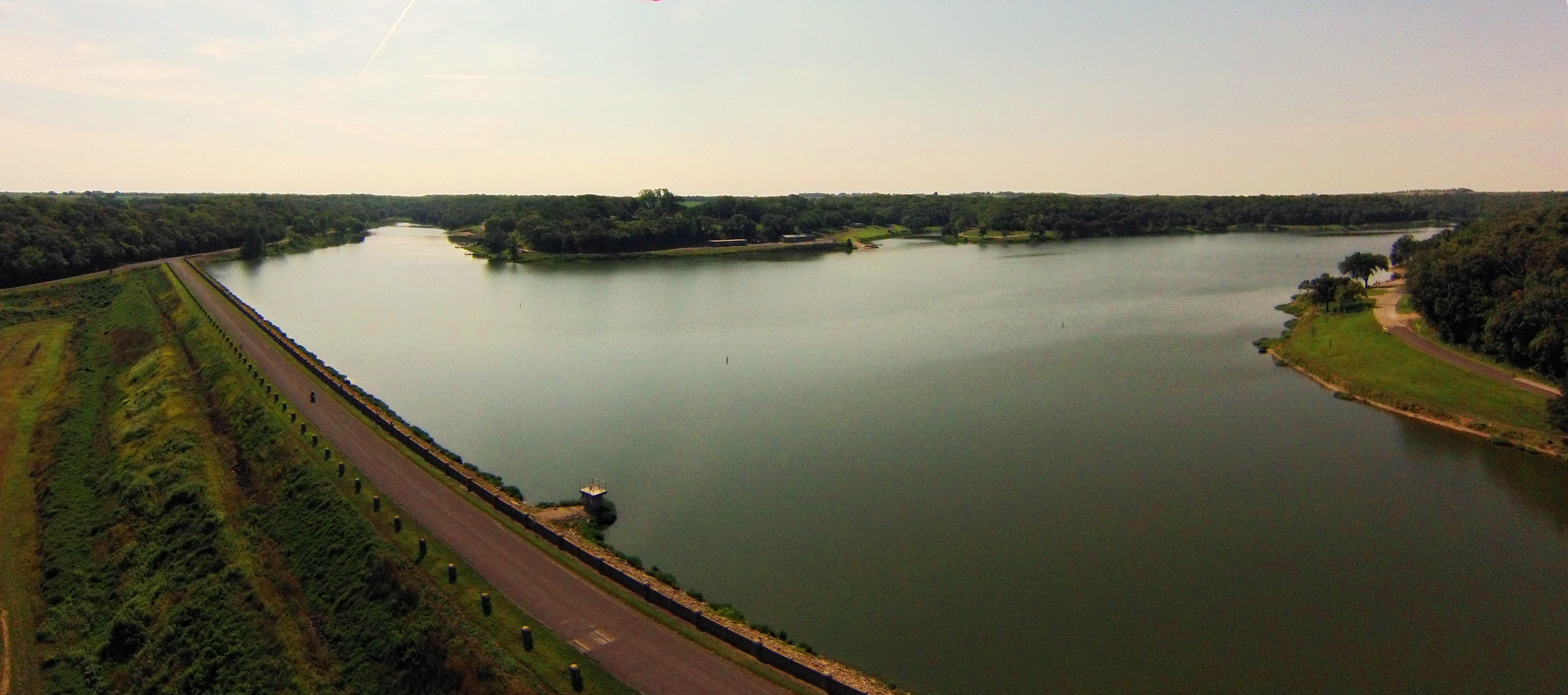
Lone Star Lake, which is in southwestern Douglas County.

According to the United States Census Bureau, the county has a total area of 475 square miles (1,230 km^{2}), of which 456 square miles (1,180 km^{2}) is land and 19 square miles (49 km^{2}) (4.0%) is water. It is the fifth-smallest county in Kansas by land area. Much of its northern boundary is defined by the Kansas River, which flows through Lawrence and provides hydropower at the Bowersock Dam.

=== Lakes ===
- Clinton Lake
- Lone Star Lake

=== Adjacent counties ===
- Jefferson County (north)
- Leavenworth County (northeast)
- Johnson County (east)
- Miami County (southeast)
- Franklin County (south)
- Osage County (southwest)
- Shawnee County (northwest)

== Demographics ==
Historical population
Census	Pop.	Note	%±
1860	8,637		—
1870	20,592		138.4%
1880	21,700		5.4%
1890	23,961		10.4%
1900	25,096		4.7%
1910	24,724		−1.5%
1920	23,998		−2.9%
1930	25,143		4.8%
1940	25,171		0.1%
1950	34,086		35.4%
1960	43,720		28.3%
1970	57,932		32.5%
1980	67,640		16.8%
1990	81,798		20.9%
2000	99,962		22.2%
2010	110,826		10.9%
2020	118,785		7.2%
2025 (est.)	120,920	▲	1.8%
U.S. Decennial Census; 1790-1960 1900-1990; 1990-2000 2010-2020

Douglas County comprises the Lawrence, KS Metropolitan Statistical Area, which is also included in the Kansas City-Overland Park-Kansas City, MO-KS Combined Statistical Area.

=== 2020 census ===
Douglas County, Kansas – Racial and ethnic composition Note: the US Census treats Hispanic/Latino as an ethnic category. This table excludes Latinos from the racial categories and assigns them to a separate category. Hispanics/Latinos may be of any race.
Race / Ethnicity (NH = Non-Hispanic)	Pop 1980	Pop 1990	Pop 2000	Pop 2010	Pop 2020	% 1980	% 1990	% 2000	% 2010	% 2020
White alone (NH)	59,714	71,747	84,543	90,532	90,281	88.28%	87.71%	84.58%	81.69%	76.00%
Black or African American alone (NH)	3,003	3,274	4,148	4,204	5,104	4.44%	4.00%	4.15%	3.79%	4.30%
Native American or Alaska Native alone (NH)	1,753	2,020	2,401	2,636	2,579	2.59%	2.47%	2.40%	2.38%	2.17%
Asian alone (NH)	1,032	2,541	3,095	4,112	4,657	1.53%	3.11%	3.10%	3.71%	3.92%
Native Hawaiian or Pacific Islander alone (NH)	x	x	54	59	84	x	x	0.05%	0.05%	0.07%
Other race alone (NH)	590	78	133	153	523	0.87%	0.10%	0.13%	0.14%	0.44%
Mixed race or Multiracial (NH)	x	x	2,320	3,479	7,262	x	x	2.32%	3.14%	6.11%
Hispanic or Latino (any race)	1,548	2,138	3,268	5,651	8,295	2.29%	2.61%	3.27%	5.10%	6.98%
Total	67,640	81,798	99,962	110,826	118,785	100.00%	100.00%	100.00%	100.00%	100.00%

=== 2020 census ===
As of the 2020 census, the county had a population of 118,785, a median age of 32.2 years, 18.9% of residents under the age of 18, 13.8% aged 65 and over, 97.6 males for every 100 females overall, 95.6 males for every 100 females age 18 and over, with 85.4% of residents living in urban areas and 14.6% in rural areas.

The racial makeup of the county was 78.0% White, 4.5% Black or African American, 2.5% American Indian and Alaska Native, 3.9% Asian, 0.1% Native Hawaiian and Pacific Islander, 2.2% from some other race, and 8.8% from two or more races, while Hispanic or Latino residents of any race comprised 7.0% of the population.

There were 48,553 households in the county, of which 25.2% had children under the age of 18 living with them and 28.7% had a female householder with no spouse or partner present; 33.1% of households were made up of individuals and 9.6% had someone living alone who was 65 years of age or older.

There were 52,846 housing units, of which 8.1% were vacant, with occupied units evenly split between owner-occupancy and rentals, and vacancy rates of 1.6% for homeowners and 7.4% for rentals.

=== 2000 census ===
As of the census of 2000, there were 99,962 people, 38,486 households, and 21,167 families residing in the county. The population density was 219 people per square mile (85 people/km^{2}). There were 40,250 housing units at an average density of 88 per square mile (34/km^{2}). The racial makeup of the county was 86.1% White, 4.2% Black or African American, 2.6% Native American, 3.1% Asian, 0.1% Pacific Islander, 1.2% from other races, and 2.7% from two or more races. Hispanic or Latino of any race were 3.3% of the population.

There were 38,486 households, out of which 27.4% had children under the age of 18 living with them, 43.1% were married couples living together, 8.5% had a female householder with no husband present, and 45.0% were non-families. 28.5% of all households were made up of individuals, and 5.8% had someone living alone who was 65 years of age or older. The average household size was 2.37 and the average family size was 2.97.

In the county, the population was spread out, with 20.4% under the age of 18, 26.4% from 18 to 24, 28.3% from 25 to 44, 16.9% from 45 to 64, and 7.9% who were 65 years of age or older. The median age was 27 years. For every 100 females there were 98.70 males. For every 100 females age 18 and over, there were 97.70 males.

The median income for a household in the county was $37,547, and the median income for a family was $53,991. Males had a median income of $35,577 versus $27,225 for females. The per capita income for the county was $19,952. About 6.2% of families and 15.9% of the population were below the poverty line, including 9.0% of those under age 18 and 7.3% of those age 65 or over.

== Government ==
=== County ===
In recent years, since the 1990s, the Democratic Party has been dominant in Douglas County. Democrats control all County-wide offices in the county. Douglas County is currently served by county commissioners Patrick Kelly, Shannon Reid, Karen Willey, Gene Dorsey, and Erica Anderson, all Democrats. According to the Kansas Secretary of State's office, as of July 2021, there were 35,146 registered Democrats, 22,324 registered Republicans, 900 registered Libertarians, and 21,474 Independents in the county.

=== State ===
Democratic state representatives representing portions of the county include Eileen Horn (10th District), Barbara Ballard (44th District), Mike Amyx (45th District), and Dennis Highberger (46th District); Republican state representatives include Jim Karleskint (42nd District), and Ken Corbet (54th District). The three state senators representing the county, Marci Francisco (2nd District), Tom Holland (3rd District), and Anthony Hensley (19th District), are all Democrats.

=== Presidential elections ===
Presidential election results

United States presidential election results for Douglas County, Kansas
Year	Republican		Democratic		Third party(ies)	
Year	No.	%	No.	%	No.	%
1880	3,049	64.08%	1,462	30.73%	247	5.19%
1884	3,366	60.85%	1,676	30.30%	490	8.86%
1888	3,189	60.02%	1,669	31.41%	455	8.56%
1892	3,114	57.31%	0	0.00%	2,320	42.69%
1896	3,582	57.40%	2,573	41.23%	85	1.36%
1900	3,453	58.56%	2,333	39.56%	111	1.88%
1904	3,574	74.27%	989	20.55%	249	5.17%
1908	3,279	60.63%	2,010	37.17%	119	2.20%
1912	1,133	21.78%	1,888	36.29%	2,182	41.94%
1916	4,975	53.87%	3,834	41.52%	426	4.61%
1920	6,266	73.23%	2,197	25.67%	94	1.10%
1924	8,052	75.25%	1,922	17.96%	726	6.79%
1928	8,887	78.70%	2,297	20.34%	108	0.96%
1932	7,346	58.67%	4,833	38.60%	342	2.73%
1936	8,324	62.21%	4,961	37.07%	96	0.72%
1940	9,146	70.28%	3,727	28.64%	141	1.08%
1944	8,224	67.47%	3,886	31.88%	79	0.65%
1948	9,287	64.25%	4,778	33.06%	389	2.69%
1952	11,095	74.34%	3,765	25.23%	64	0.43%
1956	11,029	71.85%	4,283	27.90%	39	0.25%
1960	11,337	66.43%	5,690	33.34%	38	0.22%
1964	7,825	45.09%	9,416	54.26%	112	0.65%
1968	10,533	53.79%	6,936	35.42%	2,114	10.80%
1972	15,316	55.64%	11,646	42.31%	565	2.05%
1976	14,277	51.28%	11,922	42.82%	1,643	5.90%
1980	14,106	49.01%	9,360	32.52%	5,318	18.48%
1984	18,975	58.87%	12,880	39.96%	378	1.17%
1988	16,149	49.90%	15,752	48.68%	460	1.42%
1992	12,949	30.64%	19,439	45.99%	9,877	23.37%
1996	16,116	42.63%	18,116	47.93%	3,568	9.44%
2000	17,062	42.83%	18,249	45.81%	4,527	11.36%
2004	20,544	41.00%	28,634	57.14%	933	1.86%
2008	17,929	33.42%	34,398	64.13%	1,314	2.45%
2012	17,401	35.91%	29,267	60.39%	1,796	3.71%
2016	14,688	29.32%	31,195	62.28%	4,204	8.39%
2020	17,286	28.84%	40,785	68.04%	1,870	3.12%
2024	17,523	29.85%	39,582	67.42%	1,602	2.73%

Douglas County has a political history more typical of Vermont and Maine than of the Great Plains. This is due to the county's strong New England roots. It voted for the Republican candidate in every presidential election between 1864 and 1960, except in 1912 when the GOP was mortally divided and the county supported Progressive Theodore Roosevelt. Roosevelt would later rejoin the GOP. The county reverted to form and gave Republican presidential nominees over 60 percent of the vote in every election between 1920 and 1960 (except 1932 when Herbert Hoover received 58.7 percent). Notably, it was one of the few counties where Franklin D. Roosevelt was shut out in all four of his successful campaigns for president; in FDR's national landslide of 1936, Douglas was his weakest county and the second-best for Republican nominee and Kansas Governor Alf Landon.

This tradition was broken in 1964, when the conservative sentiment and Western origins of Barry Goldwater drove the county into Lyndon B. Johnson's hands, making Johnson the first Democrat ever to carry the county. Even then, however, Goldwater managed 45 percent of the county's vote. With more moderate GOP candidates, the GOP carried the county in every election between 1968 and 1988. During this time, Jimmy Carter in 1976 and Michael Dukakis in 1988 were the only Democrats to come reasonably close to carrying the county.

However, the growing transformation of Lawrence into a liberal academic center has pulled the county into the Democratic column in every election since 1992. This was typical of many counties around the country dominated by college towns. In 2004, John Kerry became only the second Democrat to win a majority of the county's vote. Since then, Douglas County has been one of the most Democratic counties in Kansas; only Wyandotte County has been more Democratic. In 2016, 2020, and 2024, for instance, Donald Trump turned in the worst showings on record for a Republican in the county without the presence of a credible third-party challenger on the ballot.

=== Laws ===
The county overwhelmingly voted "No" on the 2022 Kansas abortion referendum, an anti-abortion ballot measure, by 81% to 19%, outpacing its support of Joe Biden during the 2020 presidential election.

=== Law enforcement ===
The Douglas County Sheriff's office has two divisions, Corrections, which operates a 185-bed jail, and Operations. The Operations Division includes a dive team, a patrol, and a warrants unit. The department works with other local police agencies at the University of Kansas, Lawrence Police Department, Eudora, and Baldwin City. As of 2026 the sheriff is Jay T. Armbrister.

== Education ==
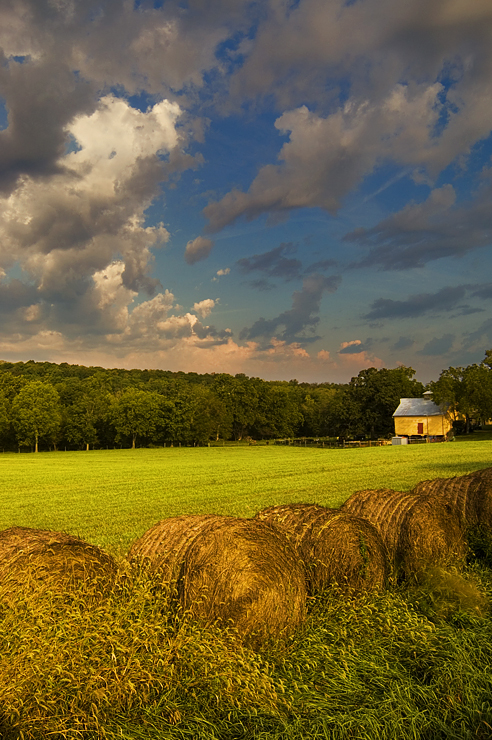
Scenic view of Rural Douglas County

=== Universities ===
- Baker University, the state's oldest university, is located in Baldwin City.
- Haskell Indian Nations University is located in Lawrence.
- University of Kansas (KU) main campus is located in Lawrence.

=== Unified school districts ===
Douglas County is served by seven school districts.

- Lawrence USD 497 - serves Lawrence, the Clinton Lake area, and parts of rural Douglas County that surround Lawrence.
- Baldwin City USD 348 - serves Baldwin City and most of southern Douglas County.
- Eudora USD 491 - serves Eudora and the northeast part of the county.

School district office in neighboring county

- Perry-Lecompton USD 343 serves Lecompton and most of northwest Douglas County.
- Shawnee Heights USD 450 - services the extreme western part of the county including Big Springs.
- Santa Fe Trail USD 434 - an Osage County school district that covers the far southwest part of the county.
- Wellsville USD 289 - covers extreme southeast Douglas County.
- West Franklin USD 287

== Parks ==
Clinton Lake, completed in 1980, offers boating, fishing and other water sports and various parks surrounding the lake provides camping and trails for mountain biking, hiking and horseback riding.

Lone Star Lake is a small country lake to the southwest of Lawrence offers fishing, boating and camping. Just northeast of Baldwin City is Douglas State Fishing Lake which provides hunting, fishing and limited camping. Other parks around the county include Black Jack Park which includes the Ivan Boyd Prairie Preserve and Robert Hall Pearson Memorial Park, Broken Arrow Park in Lawrence and Wells Overlook Park just south of Lawrence.

== Events ==
Major events in the county include the Maple Leaf Festival in Baldwin City every third full weekend in October. Lecompton's Territorial Days take place every year in June and Lawrence has many parades throughout the year including Christmas and St. Patrick's Day.

== Transportation ==
=== Major highways ===
- I-70 / Kansas Turnpike, runs east to west just north of Lawrence.
- US-59 runs north to south through the middle of the county and the middle of Lawrence.
- US-40 virtually follows the Oregon Trail heading west out of Lawrence.
- US-56 runs east to west in the southern half of the county, going through Baldwin City and skirts the Santa Fe Trail.
- K-10 runs from the I-70 Lecompton Exchange along the south and west border of Lawrence to US-59 then north until 23rd Street where it heads east out of town into Johnson County.

Other major highways include:

- US-24 which is in Grant township leading from Leavenworth to Jefferson County.
- K-32 starts just outside Lawrence and leads into Leavenworth County.
- K-33 is in extreme southeast Douglas County and leads into Franklin County.

=== County Highways ===
Douglas County also maintains an extensive network of county highways to serve the rural areas of the county. None of these county highways is in the Lawrence city limits.

== Communities ==
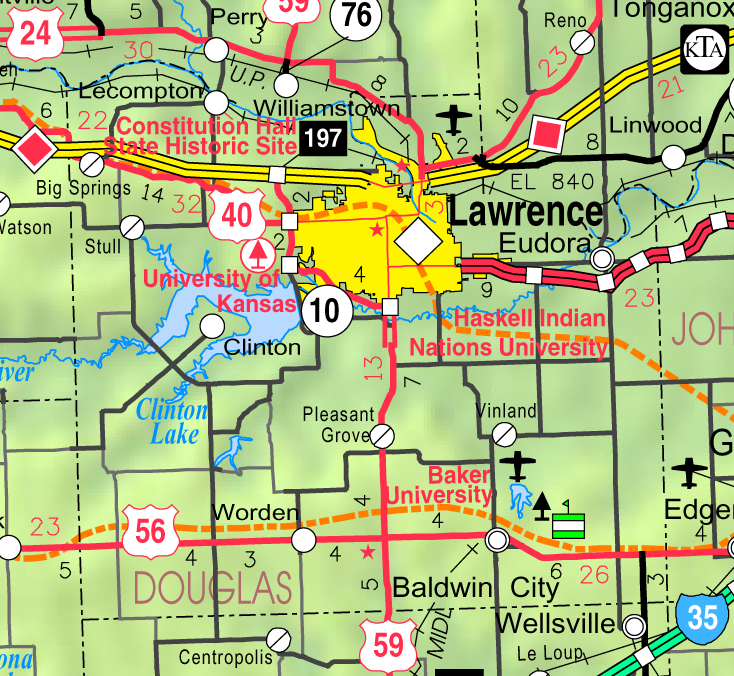
2005 map of Douglas County (map legend)

List of townships / incorporated cities / unincorporated communities / extinct former communities within Douglas County.

=== Cities ===
- Baldwin City
- Eudora
- Lawrence (county seat)
- Lecompton

=== Unincorporated communities ===
- Big Springs
- Black Jack
- Clearfield
- Clinton
- Globe
- Grover
- Hesper
- Kanwaka
- Lake View
- Lone Star
- Midland
- Pleasant Grove
- Sibleyville
- Stull
- Vinland
- Worden

=== Ghost towns ===
- Belvoir
- Franklin
- Lapeer
- Louisiana
- Media
- Prairie City
- Simmons Point Station
- Twin Mound
- Weaver

=== Townships ===
Douglas County is divided into nine townships. The city of Lawrence is considered governmentally independent and is excluded from the census figures for the townships. In the following table, the population center is the largest city (or cities) of significant size included in that township's population total.

Township	FIPS	Population center	Population	Population density /km^{2} (/sq mi)	Land area km^{2} (sq mi)	Water area km^{2} (sq mi)	Water %	Geographic coordinates
Clinton	14325		531	7 (17)	80 (31)	26 (10)	24.41%	38°54′18″N 95°24′20″W
Eudora	21700	Eudora	5,571	43 (113)	128 (49)	2 (1)	1.57%	38°55′42″N 95°6′15″W
Grant	27650		442	10 (27)	43 (16)	0 (0)	0.74%	39°0′8″N 95°13′19″W
Kanwaka	36075		1,317	12 (30)	114 (44)	8 (3)	6.69%	38°57′37″N 95°23′16″W
Lecompton	39175	Lecompton	1,761	20 (51)	90 (35)	2 (1)	2.45%	39°2′31″N 95°24′27″W
Marion	44700		836	5 (12)	185 (72)	1 (0)	0.52%	38°49′4″N 95°24′35″W
Palmyra	54225	Baldwin City	5,760	27 (70)	212 (82)	2 (1)	0.79%	38°47′0″N 95°10′40″W
Wakarusa	74400		2,237	19 (49)	119 (46)	2 (1)	1.81%	38°55′49″N 95°14′43″W
Willow Springs	79500		1,409	10 (26)	141 (54)	1 (0)	0.54%	38°47′23″N 95°18′17″W
Sources: "Census 2000 U.S. Gazetteer Files". U.S. Census Bureau, Geography Division. Archived from the original on August 2, 2002.

Map of Douglas County, 1889, from History of Kansas.

==== Historic townships ====
The county originally had only four townships. Lecompton comprised the area of Lecompton, Kanwaka, and Clinton townships; Washington took the place of Marion and Willow Springs townships; Wakarusa comprised both Wakarusa and Eudora townships; and Calhoun was the original name of Palmyra township. Grant township was annexed from Jefferson County in 1874.

== Notable people ==
- Isaac F. Hughes, Douglas County commissioner and City Council member in both Lawrence, Kansas, and Los Angeles, California.

== See also ==
- National Register of Historic Places listings in Douglas County, Kansas
- Kansas River - Natural crossing point for westward wagon trains on the Oregon Trail
- California Road - Cutoff on the Oregon Trail to Lawrence, Kansas from Westport
- Santa Fe Trail Swales

Community information for Kansas

- Kansas locations by per capita income
- List of counties in Kansas
- List of townships in Kansas
- List of cities in Kansas
- List of unincorporated communities in Kansas
- List of ghost towns in Kansas
