= Judge Wakefield's house =

- Kanwaka Township, Douglas County, Kansas

Site information
- Type: fortified house during Bleeding Kansas era
- Controlled by: John A. Wakefield

Location
- Coordinates: 38.9637°N 95.4363°W

Site history
- Built: summer 1854
- In use: summer 1854 to September 1, 1856
- Materials: wood, sod

Garrison information
- Garrison: sometimes free-state partisans

John Allen Wakefield and his family was one of the first settlers to come to the newly created Kansas Territory. Free soilers, they arrived in western Douglas County, Kansas, in July 1854, one month after the territory was opened to settlement. They built a large log house to serve primarily as their living quarters. It had six rooms and was 6 miles (9.7 km) west of the free-state stronghold of Lawrence, Kansas. For protection the family built loop holes for guns into the sides of the house.

Wakefield became the justice of the Squatters' Court, when it was organized August 26, 1854. Because of his position, he was thereafter known as Judge Wakefield. He tried cases involving both northern and southern settlers and until spring 1856 both groups got along without much trouble. That spring southern partisans in the area began a picket of men assigned to watch the house. In August 1856 much trouble erupted between the free-state men and the southern men in eastern Kansas. Free-state men at times garrisoned Judge Wakefield's house. At 2 A.M. on August 16 southern partisans, including Henry T. Titus, attacked the fortress home, but they were unable to take it. Later that day free-state men attacked and destroy the fortress home of Titus, called Fort Titus.

The southern partisans sought retaliation for their string of defeats in August, when not only Fort Titus, but New Georgia's fort, Franklin's Fort and Fort Saunders were all taken by free-state partisans. On the night of September 1, 1856, the southerners burned six houses and one other building, including Judge Wakefield's house. The family lost all their possessions.

Later another house and some farm buildings were constructed at the site. Judge Wakefield lived there until his death in June 1873.
