= Newell W. Spicer =

U.S. military volunteer

Newell W. Spicer was a Union Army lieutenant colonel of volunteers during the American Civil War and a commander of the 1st Regiment Kansas Volunteer Infantry. He was also a leader of pro-abolitionist forces during Bleeding Kansas, a violent period in the history of Kansas when factions fought over proposals to abolish slavery in that state.

== Bleeding Kansas ==
Spicer moved to Kansas with the New England Emigrant Aid Company, an organization which helped anti-slavery immigrants migrating into the Kansas Territory in the wake of the Kansas-Nebraska Act with the goal of ensuring slavery was not legalized there. In Kansas, he joined the town militia and was part of raids against pro-slavery factions during Bleeding Kansas. Spicer arrived in Kansas in August 1856 with a militia company from Chicago and took part in the fighting at Fort Saunders. He was initially a first lieutenant of the company under Captain James A. Harvey and rose to the office of adjutant for the company.

In August 1856, Spicer was a leader in the Battle of Fort Titus, a raid against Henry Theodore Titus at his cabin outside of the then-Kansas Territorial capital of Lecompton. Spicer's account of the events in Kansas are a part of the Thaddeus Hyatt Collection.

After the violence settled in late 1856, Spicer joined the Stubbs company, a Leavenworth militia, and was elected to the rank of third lieutenant in 1859. In Leavenworth, he also ran for the position of city marshal in 1858. Spicer reported being part of a party held captive, and robbed by a proslavery territorial militia in an 1859 claim for property lost in September 1856.

== Civil War ==
On 3 June 1861, Spicer joined Company D of the 1st Regiment Kansas Volunteer Infantry as a first lieutenant, fighting at the Battle of Wilson's Creek, where he was mentioned by a journalist of the St. Louis Republican as having "performed gallantly" along with other regimental officers. He was promoted to captain (becoming the company commander) on 26 May 1862 and to lieutenant colonel (second highest ranking regimental officer) on 1 June 1863. By the time of the May 1864 Yazoo City Expedition, Spicer was a Lieutenant Colonel and in command of the regiment, which had become a mounted infantry unit by that point in the war, due to Colonel William Y. Roberts having been placed in command of a brigade. He mustered out with the regiment on 17 June 1864.

In the summer of 1864, Spicer was one of the men sent to bring a man thought to be the pro-Confederate guerrilla William Quantrill back to Kansas for trial and execution. But the men determined the man in custody was not Quantrill. By October he was lieutenant colonel of the 3rd Kansas State Militia Regiment, a local militia unit in Lawrence, which was called up to defend the state against the raid of Confederate cavalry commander Sterling Price. After the regiment mustered out following the defeat of Price Spicer continued as lieutenant colonel and was regimental commander in December.

== Post-war ==
After the war, Spicer was made Marshal in Lawrence in 1868 and promoted to City Marshal in 1869. Among his duties were to track down members of the gang of William Quantrill. He resigned from the city police force in June 1869.

In 1910, Spicer's wife, Eunice, stated that he had been a member of the Government Secret Service after counterfeiters and in August 1871 left Lawrence for Baxter Springs, Kansas, but never returned and no word was ever again heard by her of him. Eunice filed for divorce on account of abandonment in September 1871.
