= Theo Titus =

American politician

Member of the Georgia House of Representatives 143rd district
- In office 1989–1993
- Preceded by: Allen Sherrod

Member of the Georgia House of Representatives 180th district
- In office 1993–1999
- Succeeded by: John Bulloch

Personal details
- Born: Theodore Titus III; March 12, 1920 Thomasville, Georgia, US
- Died: August 16, 2008 (aged 88) Thomasville, Georgia, US
- Party: Republican
- Spouse: Camille
- Profession: Journalist

Theodore Titus III (March 12, 1920 – August 16, 2008) was an American journalist, businessman, and politician. He served as a Republican member of the Georgia House of Representatives. He was the uncle of Dina Titus, a Democratic member of the U.S. House of Representatives from Nevada.

== Early years and business ==
Titus was born March 12, 1920, to Theo Titus, Jr. and Margaret Crovatt Titus, in Thomasville, Georgia. He was the grandson of Theodore Titus, Sr., a distinguished south Georgia jurist, and great-grandson of Col. Henry Theodore Titus, founder and namesake of Titusville, Florida. He served in the United States Army Air Corps during World War II, then returned to Thomasville where he owned and operated the Titus Cadillac Company for twenty years. He then worked for the Federal Disaster Assistance Administration (later reorganized as FEMA) for another twenty years.

== Political career ==
In 1988 Titus was elected to the Georgia House of Representatives. He ran as a Republican in an area of the state that had, for many years, been represented by Democrats. He served five terms from 1989 to 1999, during a period when his district was reconfigured and renumbered as part of the periodic reapportionment process. Titus served on Agriculture and Consumer Affairs, Game Fish & Parks, and the powerful Appropriations committee.

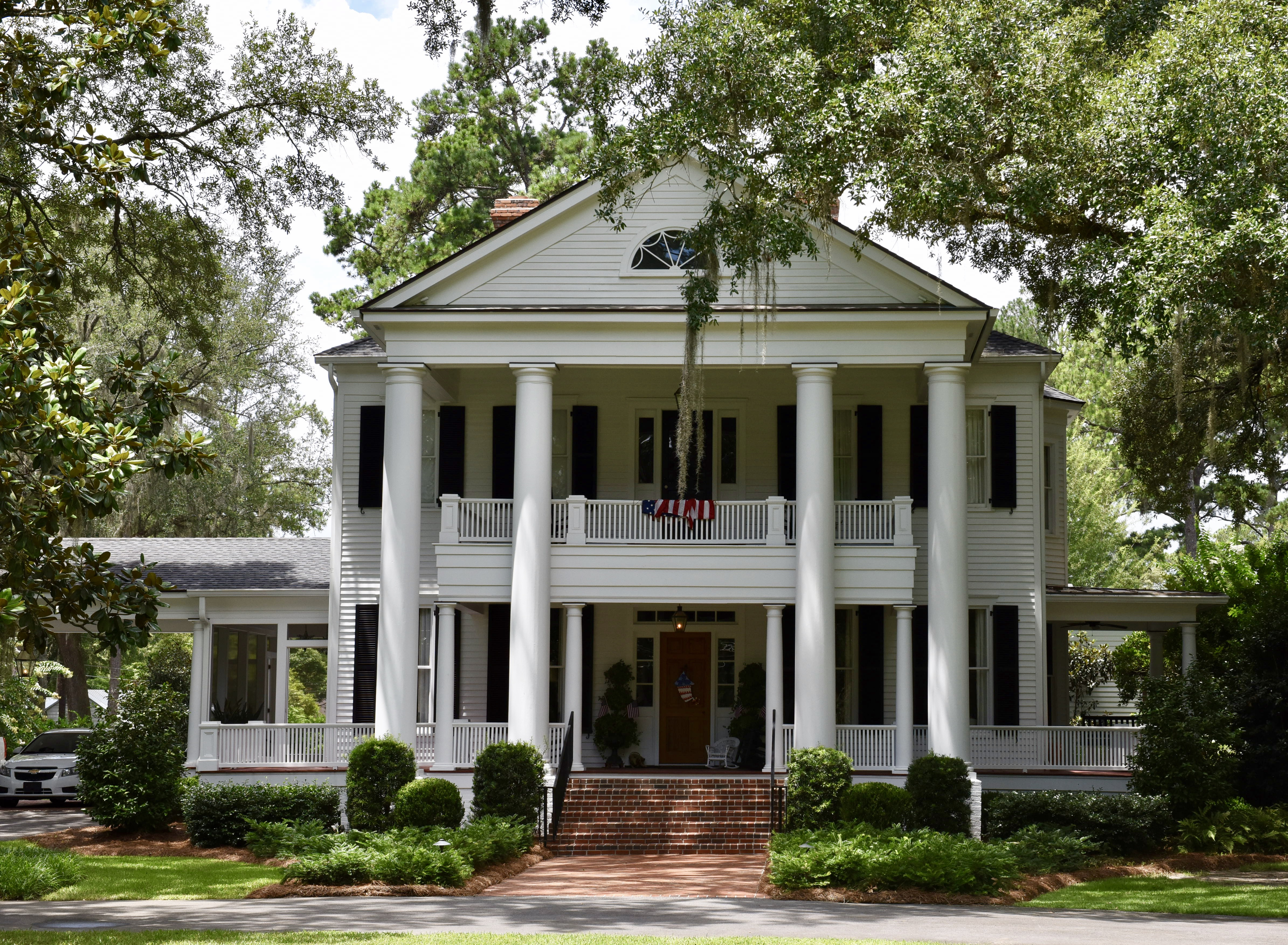
The Theo Titus (Sr.) House in the Gordon Avenue Historic District

== Later years and family ==
After "retiring", Titus took up an active pastime as a columnist for the Thomasville Times-Enterprise. Over the course of twenty years, from 1986 to 2006, he wrote an estimated 1000 columns on a number of subjects, but mostly about nature. Declining health forced him to suspend his writing, two years prior to his death. His daughter, Tamara Titus, edited a collection of his columns and published them as a book: An Outdoor Heritage-stories from a South Georgia Life.

On August 16, 2008, Titus died in Thomasville, Georgia after a long illness. His niece, Dina Titus, serves as a Democrat in the United States House of Representatives from Nevada.

In 2018, a daughter, Twitty Titus, announced her intention to run for her father's former House seat. Twitty, a Democrat, sought to unseat the four-term incumbent, a Republican, but lost in the general election. A son, Theo Titus, IV earned a degree in electrical engineering from Georgia Tech, and worked for a time as a broadcast engineer at WXIA in Atlanta followed by "careers in multiple electronics industries and companies". He retired to Tallahassee, Florida, where he is a ham radio operator with the call sign K4MVL

== See also ==
- Fort Titus
- Battle of Fort Titus
