= Battle of Fort Titus =

- Part of Bleeding Kansas
- Capture of Colonel Titus (1867 illustration)
| Date | August 16, 1856 |
| Location | Lecompton, Kansas Territory |
| Result | Free-State victory: Fort Titus destroyed |

Belligerents
| Free-State settlers | Pro-slavery settlers |

Commanders and leaders
| Samuel Walker | Henry T. Titus (surrendered) |

Strength
| c. 400 | More than 21 |

Casualties and losses
| 1 killed, 8 wounded | 2 killed, 5 seriously wounded, 17 captured |

The Battle of Fort Titus occurred during conflicts in the Kansas Territory between abolitionist and pro-slavery militias prior to the American Civil War. The era is known as Bleeding Kansas.

== Background ==
Fort Titus was built about April 1856 to be the fortress home of Henry T. Titus, a colonel in the militia of the Southern-oriented of the two governments of Kansas Territory. It was said Titus squatted on the claim of a free-state settler while he was away and built his cabin on this land. Fort Titus was a fortified log cabin with gun loopholes built into its walls to allow it to be defended from the inside. This fort had at least one window and it had a small log addition on the north side that served as a kitchen.

In August 1856 Camp Sacket, a U.S. Army post, was about a mile away from Fort Titus. Camp Sacket was established to provide some aid to the pro-slavery government of the Kansas Territory, in Lecompton. The Territorial government was sympathetic to the expansion of slavery into Kansas. In January 1856, to counter those sympathetic to the expansion of slavery, Free-State advocates illegally elected Charles L. Robinson as Territorial Governor of Kansas under the Topeka Constitution. Robinson's government was not recognized by the Federal government. From the spring of 1856 until September, Robinson and several other free-state leaders, including the son of abolitionist John Brown, were held in custody in Camp Sackett. The troops at Camp Sacket were supplied by Fort Leavenworth and did their best to maintain a neutral stance between the two sides. Both sides accused the Army of favoring the opposing side.

Some distance south of Fort Titus was another pro-slavery partisan stronghold known as Fort Saunders. When Fort Saunders came under attack and was destroyed by free-state partisans on August 15, 1856, pro-slavery partisans sought revenge. Since it was known that free-state men at times garrisoned in another nearby fortified residence, known as Judge Wakefield's house, this became the focus of retaliation for the destruction of Fort Saunders. At 2 A.M. on August 16 pro-slavery partisans, including Henry T. Titus, attacked Wakefield's fortress home, but they were unable to take it. Later that day free-state men retaliated against Titus, and attacked and destroyed Titus' fortress home.

== Battle ==
About 400 free-staters under the command of Samuel Walker attacked Fort Titus. Titus had a force of at least twenty-one men, including thirteen German stonemasons from nearby Lecompton, Kansas, with him. The attack was launched before a brass cannon had arrived on the site. This attempt was unsuccessful and the leader of this first attack was killed. Apparently some of the men from this attack placed themselves between Lecompton and the Army troops, so no messages could be sent between Wilson Shannon, the governor, and the troops.

Once the cannon arrived the battle ended quickly, since the fort's walls were no match for the cannonballs, which passed entirely through the fort. This cannon, named Old Sacramento, had changed hands between the Northern and Southern partisans three times prior to this battle. The cannonballs were made from type from a Lawrence newspaper. The battle probably lasted no more than thirty minutes. The Camp Sacket commander, Maj. John Sedgwick, moved toward Fort Titus to stop the battle, but it was over before troops arrived.

As soon as the battle was finished, the prisoners were taken to Lawrence and Fort Titus was burned, never to be rebuilt.

== Aftermath ==
A correspondent for The New York Times wrote the following, dated Lawrence, Sunday, August 17, 1856, after the battle:

When the advance guard of the Free-State forces arrived at Judge Wakefield's, on the California road, they were fired upon by a company of Pro-slavery men under Col. Titus. The fire was returned, and Titus and his men retreated, leaving one of their number dead.

Colonel Titus's cabin was within two miles of Lecompton, and like the other brigand leaders, he fortified it against attack. Early in the morning a party of Free-State cavalry made a charge upon some tents near the cabin, the inmates of which ran for the cabin, and were followed by the horsemen, who went too near the cabin, when they were fired upon by those inside, wounding four one, Capt. Shombre, from Indiana, mortally. The cannon was then brought up, and Cpt. Bickerton cooly [sic?] brought his piece to bear upon it. Seven balls had been fired into it, when Col. Titus showed the white flag, and surrendered. Seventeen prisoners, twenty-five stands of arms and a quantity of provisions were taken; the cabin was then burned. During the attack, the United States troops, who were encamped near by, took a position between the Free-State forces and Lecompton, directly upon the road. Unwilling to attack the troops, as they feared they would be compelled to, instead, of attacking Lecompton the Free-State men with their prisoners marched to Lawrence.

Col. Titus was wounded in the head and shoulder, another of his men was wounded, and two others killed. There were six wounded on the Free-State side. Col. Titus had taken an active part in the sack of Lawrence, and on that day publicly declared, That if he ever came into that place again he would kill every Abolitionist in it. Some of the prisoners taken with him participated in this sack and assisted in destroying the presses of the Herald of Freedom and of the Free-State, and throwing the type in the river. The cannon balls used in firing at the cabin of Col. Titus were made of the lead melted down from the type of those presses, dug from the sand on the bank of the river; and as they plowed their way through the walls of Titus's cabin, they shrieked, Surrender to Freedom! as they sped on their way. Capt. Bickerton, when he pointed his cannon sat the walls of the cabin, calmly announced that he should give them a new edition of the Herald of Freedom. Col. Titus, instead of coming to kill Abolitionists, came whiningly begging of the Abolitionists to save his miserable life. He was supplied with comfortable quarters, and a physician to attend him. The other prisoners were confined in the Herald of Freedom building, where, on the 21st of May, some of them thought they had struck a death-blow to the freedom of speech, with the blood-red banner of South Carolina disunion waving over them. How strange the contrast! Yet such is the fortune of war.

— The New York Times correspondent, 1856

The Southern partisans sought retaliation for their string of defeats in August, when not only Fort Titus, but New Georgia's fort, Franklin's Fort, and Fort Saunders were all taken by free-state partisans. On the night of September 1, 1856, the Southerners burned six houses and one other building, including Judge Wakefield's house. The Wakefield family lost all their possessions.

== See also ==
- List of battles fought in Kansas
