= WSNI (disambiguation) =

WSNI is a radio station (97.7 FM) licensed to Keene, New Hampshire.

WSNI may also refer to:

- WRFF, a radio station (104.5 FM) licensed to Philadelphia, Pennsylvania, which held the call sign WSNI from 1977 to 1990, and again from 2002 to 2006
- WRPW, a radio station (92.9 FM) licensed to Colfax, Illinois, which held the call sign WSNI from 1998 to 2001
- WGMY, a radio station (107.1 FM) licensed to Thomasville, Georgia, which held the call sign WSNI from 1991 to 1998
- WSTT, a radio station (730 AM) licensed to Thomasville, Georgia, which held the call sign WSNI in 1991
- WNWR, a radio station (1540 AM) licensed to Philadelphia, Pennsylvania, which held the call sign WSNI from 1985 to 1987
