= The Stubbs =

American militia company

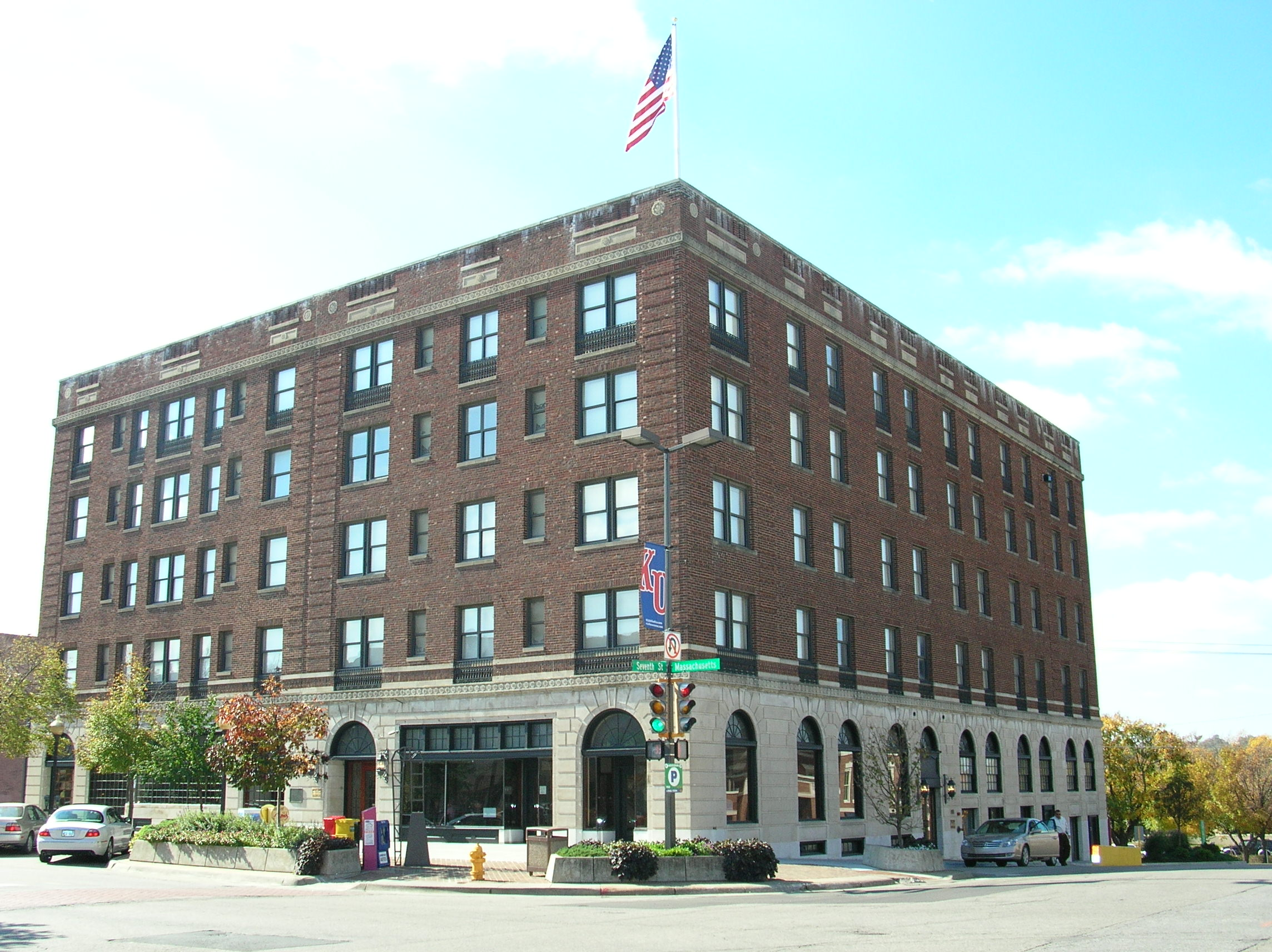
The Free State Hotel, where the Stubbs gathered periodically

The Stubbs (founded as the Kansas Rifles No. 1) were a Free-Stater militia company active in Kansas, United States during the Bleeding Kansas era. They fought in the Battle of Franklin and the capture of Fort Saunders. Along with their duties as a military defense force, the Stubbs also operated as a policing force, arresting criminals. The Stubbs had a membership of 60 on their absorption into the Union Army.

The Stubbs also took on the title of the Oread Guards after the Oread Institute donated waterproof coats.

== History ==
Founded as the Kansas Rifles No. 1 on 16 April 1855, the Lawrence-based militia consisted of two companies each approximately 50 soldiers in size. Armed with Sharps rifles and Colt revolvers, the militia was organized for the purpose of defending Free State voters and to defend Lawrence from pro-slavery forces. To accomplish this, they drilled daily. They were officially granted a charter and reorganized as the Stubbs on 9 February 1858, a nickname they had accrued because of some members' short stature.

On 3 June 1861, the last unit of the Stubbs was absorbed into the 1st Kansas Infantry Regiment as Company D. Of the 60 members of the Stubbs absorbed, 27 of them received commendations in the Civil War.

The Stubbs also held events in the Free State Hotel. These events were held for a variety of reasons, including the birthday of George Washington. In these events, enlisted members were to don ceremonial military garb set by rank.

== Battles ==
=== Battle of Black Jack ===
Although the Stubbs were assembled to fight in the Battle of Black Jack, their forces arrived so late in the course of battle that a truce had already been declared.

=== Defense of Lawrence ===
On 14 September 1856, a pro-slavery force several hundred strong, led by John William Reid, neared Lawrence, in an apparent invasion. The Stubbs deterred the assault by firing on them. The force fell back to join a larger body, reportedly between 1,500 and 2,500-strong, that garrisoned at Franklin's Fort.

=== Burning of New Georgia's fort ===
The pro-slavery fort called New Georgia's fort attracted the ire of local anti-slavery partisans. Stubbs, alongside other partisans, attacked the fort, routing its defenders and then burned the fort down.

=== Capture of Fort Saunders ===
After the murder of abolitionist David Hoyt and the response to it, pro-slavery ruffians increased in intensity in the region, in the form of the robbings and harassings of locals. Among these was the force of Philip Cook, who commanded a ruffian force around 300-strong garrisoned at Fort Saunders. The Stubbs took part in the attack against the fort led by James H. Lane, charging at it, only to find it destitute.

== Notable members ==
- Caleb S. Pratt
- Joseph Cracklin
- A.D Searle
