= Clinton, Kansas =

- Unincorporated community
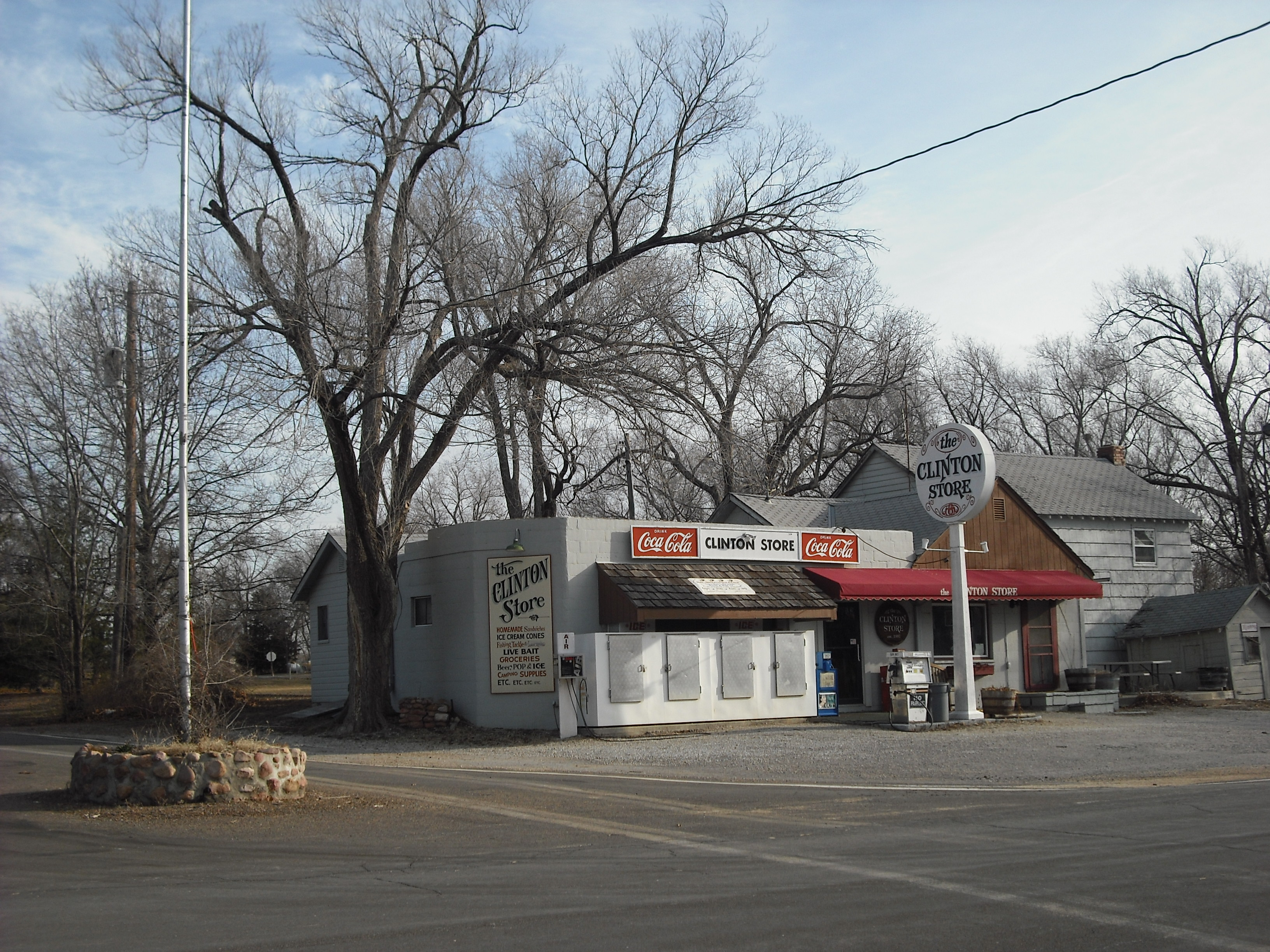
- "the Clinton Store" in Clinton (2008)

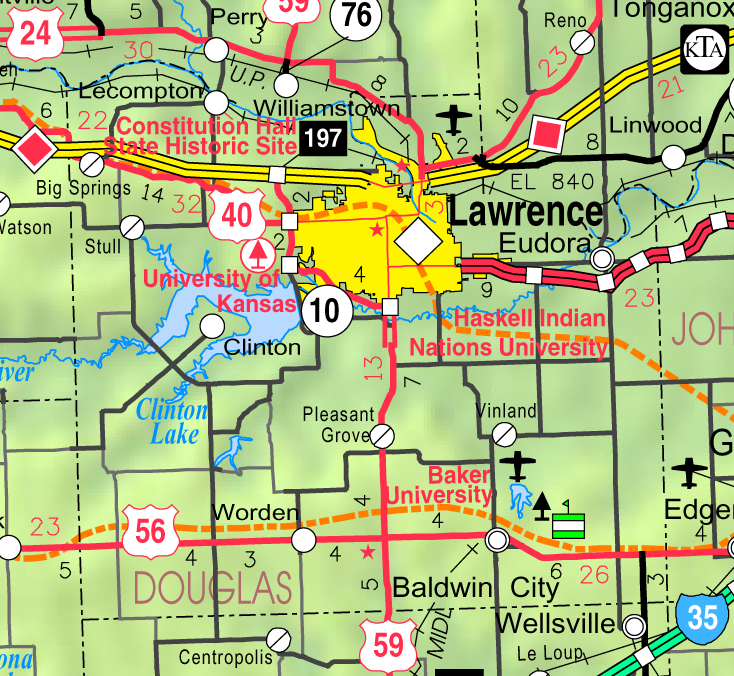
- KDOT map of Douglas County (legend)

- Location within Kansas Location within the United States
- Coordinates: 38°54′42″N 95°23′26″W
- Country: United States
- State: Kansas
- County: Douglas
- Elevation: 935 ft (285 m)
- Time zone: UTC-6 (CST)
  - Summer (DST): UTC-5 (CDT)
- Area code: 785
- FIPS code: 20-14300
- GNIS ID: 479107

Clinton is an unincorporated community on a peninsula next to Clinton Lake in Douglas County, Kansas, United States.

== History ==
=== Bloomington ===
The community of Bloomington was settled in June 1854, but was not known as such until April 1855, when Harrison Burson applied to the U.S. Government for a post office. Within eight months of the area being settled, some 530 settlers were in the area that would become Bloomington-Clinton. The people of Bloomington were greatly anti-slavery and helped slaves escape through the Underground Railroad. In early 1857, the northern half of Bloomington was moved to a new location and the southern portion of the community was renamed Winchester.

=== Winchester ===
Winchester was named after a city in Illinois, as was Bloomington. Later in the year, Bloomington acted to become an incorporated city, with Winchester following suit four days later. Winchester was incorporated on February 20, 1857, under the name of Clinton. The present name is after Clinton, Illinois.

=== Clinton ===
Clinton and Bloomington quickly became rivals, since they were only separated by about three miles. Bloomington started losing ground in 1858 when on August 30, the post office was moved to Clinton. Within the first five years of existence, Clinton constructed two schoolhouses, two churches and a town hall. In 1869, the Clinton Cemetery was established on land already used for a cemetery and is considered one of the oldest burial grounds in Douglas County.

The Lawrence & Emporia Railroad was constructed through Bloomington and Clinton in 1873, but its route was soon rendered redundant by larger competing railroads and it was abandoned by 1894. In 1876, most of Bloomington had reverted into farmland and was considered vacated.

The post office in Clinton closed in 1927.

Starting in the mid-1960s, land was purchased for the construction of Clinton Lake and the entire town of Bloomington was bulldozed, leaving only the J.C. Steele house and a milk shed standing. The house was placed on the National Register of Historic Places in 1979, but was later razed, leaving only the foundations and the stairs. The shed still stands as the Clinton Lake Museum near Bloomington Beach in the Bloomington Recreation Area.

=== Bleeding Kansas ===
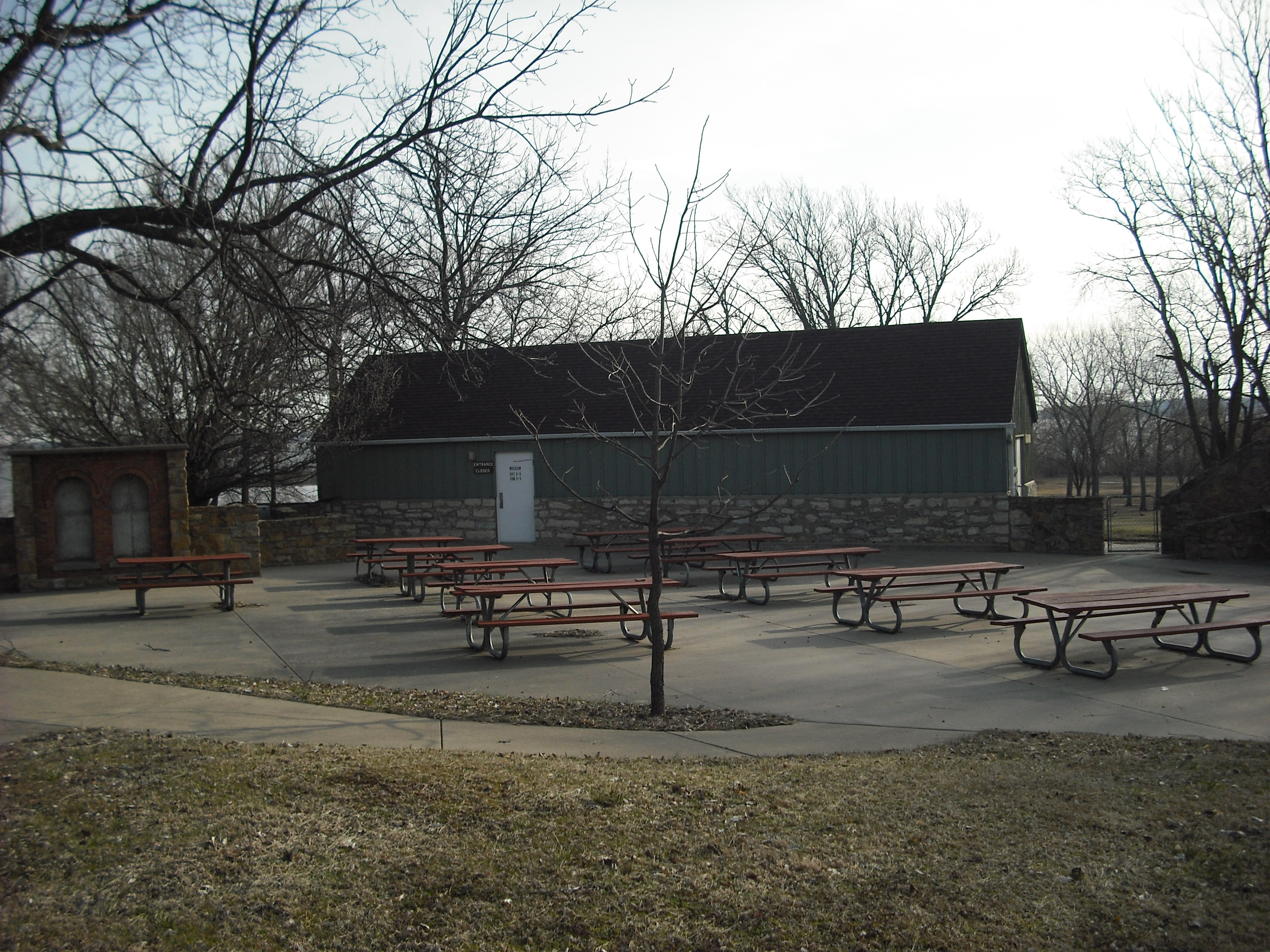
The Wakarusa River Valley Heritage Museum near Clinton.

In August 1856, the Lawrence supply route was cut off and the townspeople were forced to travel to Lecompton which was strongly pro-slavery. Henry Hiatt and several other people were taken prisoner and fifty proslavery ruffians began marching to Bloomington. A team of 400 or 800 men marched toward Lecompton; although a confrontation was avoided, it resulted in the looting and burning of Colonel Henry T. Titus home (known as the Battle of Fort Titus).

A splinter group from William Quantrill's raid on Lawrence in 1863 rode through Bloomington but caused more damage and harm when passing through Lone Star which is about five miles south of Clinton.

== Education ==
The community is served by Lawrence USD 497 public school district.
