= Thomasville, Georgia =

City in Georgia, United States

- City
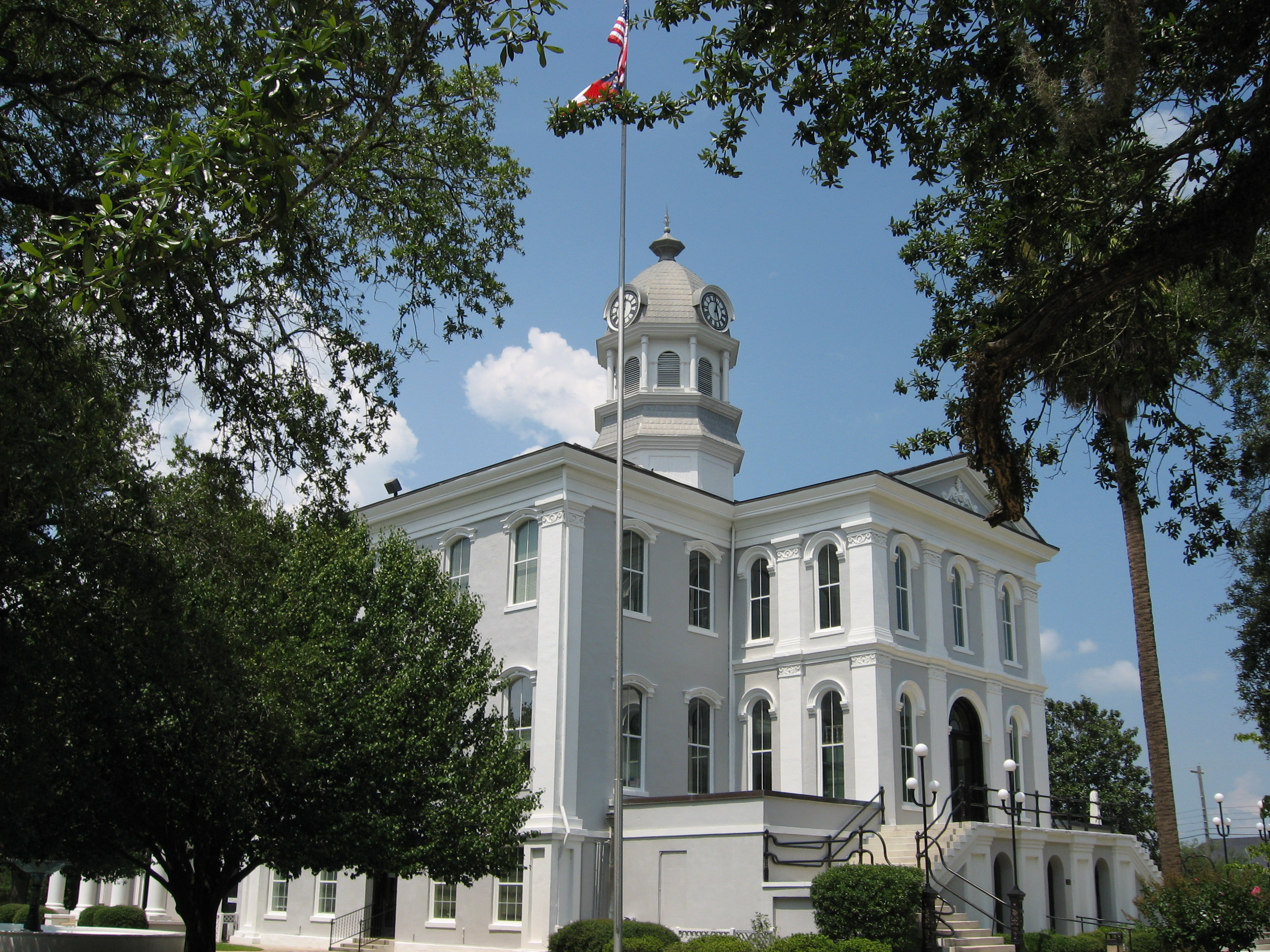
- Thomas County Courthouse

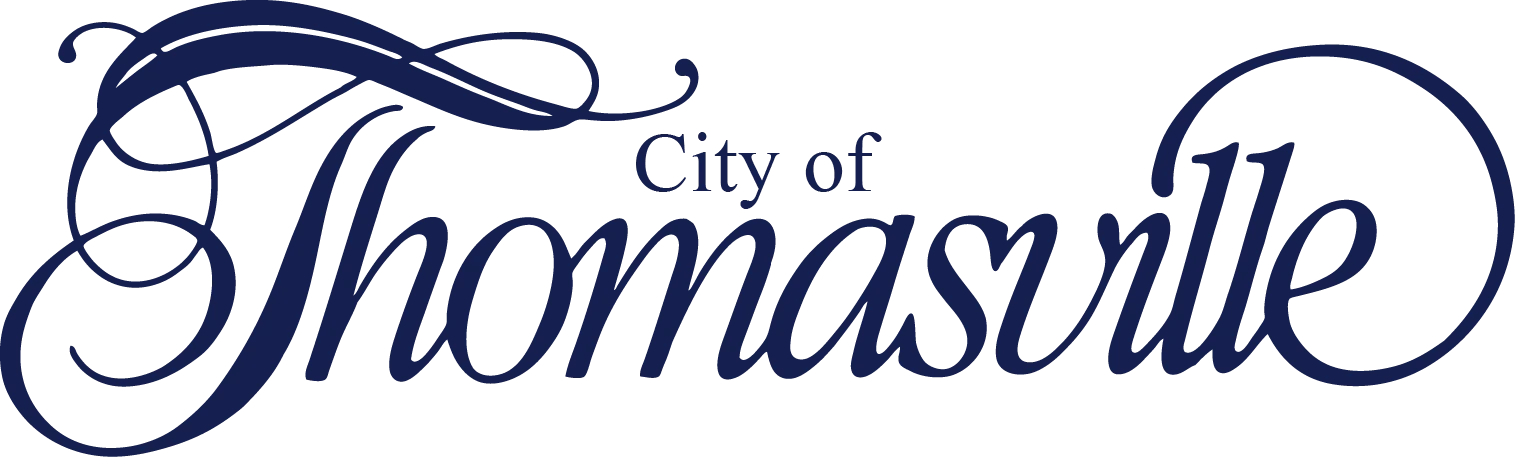
- Logo
- Nicknames: "T-Ville", The City of Roses, The Rose City, Beacon Hills (original name)
- Location in Thomas County and the state of Georgia

- Location in the United States
- Coordinates: 30°50′11″N 83°58′42″W
- Country: United States
- State: Georgia
- County: Thomas

Government
  - Mayor: Todd Mobley

Area
  - City: 15.15 sq mi (39.23 km^{2})
  - Land: 15.01 sq mi (38.88 km^{2})
  - Water: 0.13 sq mi (0.34 km^{2})
- Elevation: 279 ft (85 m)

Population (2020)
  - City: 18,881
  - Density: 1,257.6/sq mi (485.58/km^{2})
  - Metro: 45,000
- Time zone: UTC-5 (Eastern (EST))
  - Summer (DST): UTC-4 (EDT)
- ZIP Codes: 31792, 31799
- Area code: 229
- FIPS code: 13-76224
- GNIS feature ID: 0333216
- Website: thomasville.org

Thomasville is a city in and the county seat of Thomas County, Georgia, United States. The population was 18,881 in 2020.

The city deems itself the "City of Roses" and holds an annual Rose Festival. The city features plantations open to the public, a historic downtown, a large farmer's market, and an oak tree from about 1680 at the corner of Monroe and Crawford streets.

== History ==
Thomasville was founded in 1825 as seat of the newly formed Thomas County. It was incorporated as a town in 1831 and as a city in 1889. The community was named for Jett Thomas, a general in the War of 1812.

== Geography ==
According to the United States Census Bureau, the city has a total area of 14.9 square miles (39 km^{2}), of which 14.9 square miles (39 km^{2}) is land and 0.1 square miles (0.26 km^{2}) (0.40%) is water. It is the second largest city in Southwest Georgia after Albany. The city has three U.S. Routes: 19, 84 and 319. It is located 34 miles northeast of Tallahassee, Florida, 28 miles southwest of Moultrie, 43 miles west of Valdosta, 95 miles east of Dothan, Alabama, 59 miles south of Albany and 22 miles north of Monticello, Florida.

=== Climate ===
The climate in this area is characterized by hot, humid summers and generally mild to cool winters. According to the Köppen Climate Classification system, Thomasville has a humid subtropical climate, abbreviated "Cfa" on climate maps.

Climate data for Thomasville, Georgia
Month	Jan	Feb	Mar	Apr	May	Jun	Jul	Aug	Sep	Oct	Nov	Dec	Year
Record high °F (°C)	86 (30)	86 (30)	96 (36)	96 (36)	102 (39)	104 (40)	106 (41)	104 (40)	106 (41)	97 (36)	89 (32)	85 (29)	106 (41)
Mean daily maximum °F (°C)	63 (17)	68 (20)	73 (23)	79 (26)	86 (30)	90 (32)	92 (33)	91 (33)	87 (31)	81 (27)	73 (23)	65 (18)	79 (26)
Mean daily minimum °F (°C)	39 (4)	42 (6)	47 (8)	53 (12)	61 (16)	69 (21)	71 (22)	71 (22)	67 (19)	57 (14)	49 (9)	41 (5)	56 (13)
Record low °F (°C)	5 (−15)	11 (−12)	19 (−7)	30 (−1)	41 (5)	48 (9)	56 (13)	53 (12)	37 (3)	26 (−3)	11 (−12)	8 (−13)	5 (−15)
Average precipitation inches (mm)	4.80 (122)	4.88 (124)	5.67 (144)	3.08 (78)	3.00 (76)	5.84 (148)	5.68 (144)	5.72 (145)	4.52 (115)	3.02 (77)	3.44 (87)	3.65 (93)	53.3 (1,353)
Source: The Weather Channel

== Demographics ==
Historical population
Census	Pop.	Note	%±
1870	1,651		—
1880	2,555		54.8%
1890	5,514		115.8%
1900	5,322		−3.5%
1910	6,727		26.4%
1920	8,196		21.8%
1930	11,733		43.2%
1940	12,683		8.1%
1950	14,424		13.7%
1960	18,246		26.5%
1970	18,155		−0.5%
1980	18,463		1.7%
1990	17,457		−5.4%
2000	18,162		4.0%
2010	18,413		1.4%
2020	18,881		2.5%
U.S. Decennial Census; 1850-1870 1870-1880; 1890-1910 1920-1930; 1940 1950 1960; 1970 1980 1990; 2000 2010

=== 2020 census ===
As of the 2020 census, Thomasville had a population of 18,881. The median age was 38.9 years. 23.9% of residents were under the age of 18 and 18.8% of residents were 65 years of age or older. For every 100 females there were 83.9 males, and for every 100 females age 18 and over there were 79.5 males age 18 and over.

97.2% of residents lived in urban areas, while 2.8% lived in rural areas.

There were 7,849 households and 4,983 families in Thomasville, of which 30.1% had children under the age of 18 living in them. Of all households, 33.4% were married-couple households, 19.4% were households with a male householder and no spouse or partner present, and 41.6% were households with a female householder and no spouse or partner present. About 34.2% of all households were made up of individuals and 15.2% had someone living alone who was 65 years of age or older.

There were 8,874 housing units, of which 11.6% were vacant. The homeowner vacancy rate was 2.0% and the rental vacancy rate was 5.7%.

Racial composition as of the 2020 census
Race	Number	Percent
White	7,799	41.3%
Black or African American	9,930	52.6%
American Indian and Alaska Native	48	0.3%
Asian	215	1.1%
Native Hawaiian and Other Pacific Islander	6	0.0%
Some other race	220	1.2%
Two or more races	663	3.5%
Hispanic or Latino (of any race)	512	2.7%

== Economy ==
The bakery company Flowers Foods is based in Thomasville. Senior Life Insurance Company and Archbold Medical Center are also based in Thomasville.

== Arts and culture ==
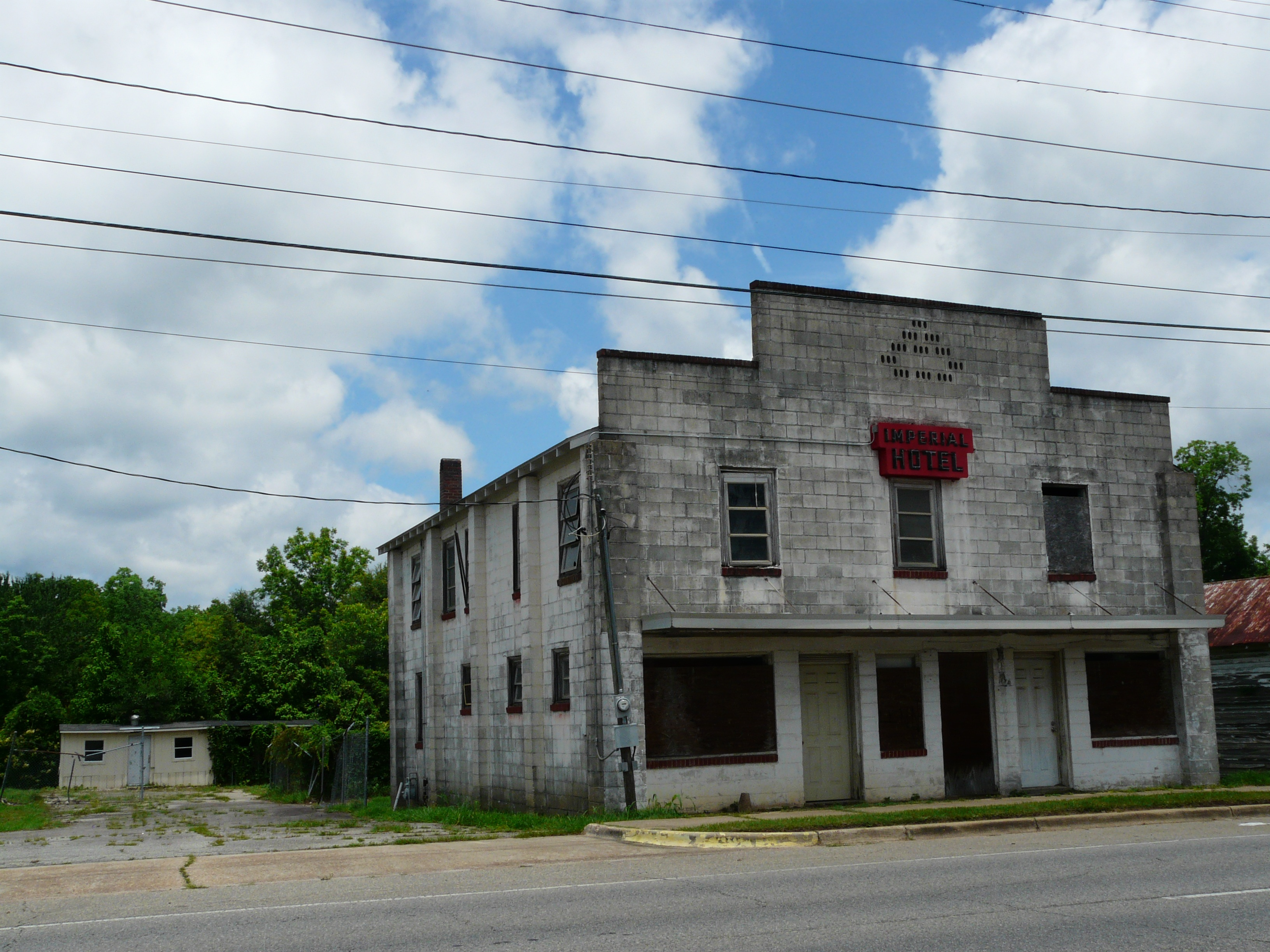
The historic Imperial Hotel on Jackson Street

Thomasville plants and maintains more than 1,000 roses located throughout the city, as do a number of residents who have their own rose gardens. During the last week of April, rose growers from all over the world display their prize roses for a panel of judges. The Thomasville Rose Garden at Cherokee Lake Park is the largest of 85 rose beds maintained by the city, and is host to the annual rose festival.

Thomasville is home to several historic and cultural organizations, including the Thomas County Historical Society and Museum of History, Thomasville Landmarks, Inc. the Thomasville Center for the Arts, the Jack Hadley Black History Museum, and Pebble Hill Plantation. Daily tours and research hours are available at each institution.

An Annual MLK (Rev. Dr. Martin Luther King Jr.) Walk and Festival is held there in January of each year since 2009.

== Education ==
=== Thomasville City School District ===
The Thomasville City School District serves pre-school to grade twelve, and consists of three elementary schools, a middle school, and a high school, Thomasville High School. The district has 204 full-time teachers and over 3,107 students.

=== Thomas County School District ===
The Thomas County School District serves pre-school to grade twelve, and consists of three elementary schools, a middle school, and two high schools, Thomas County Central High School and Bishop Hall Charter School. The district has 329 full-time teachers and over 5,466 students.

=== Private schools ===
- Thomasville Christian School (Pre-K - 9)
- Brookwood School (Pre-K-12) Independent college preparatory school.

=== Higher education ===
- Thomas University - Main Campus
- Southern Regional Technical College - Main Campus

== Media ==
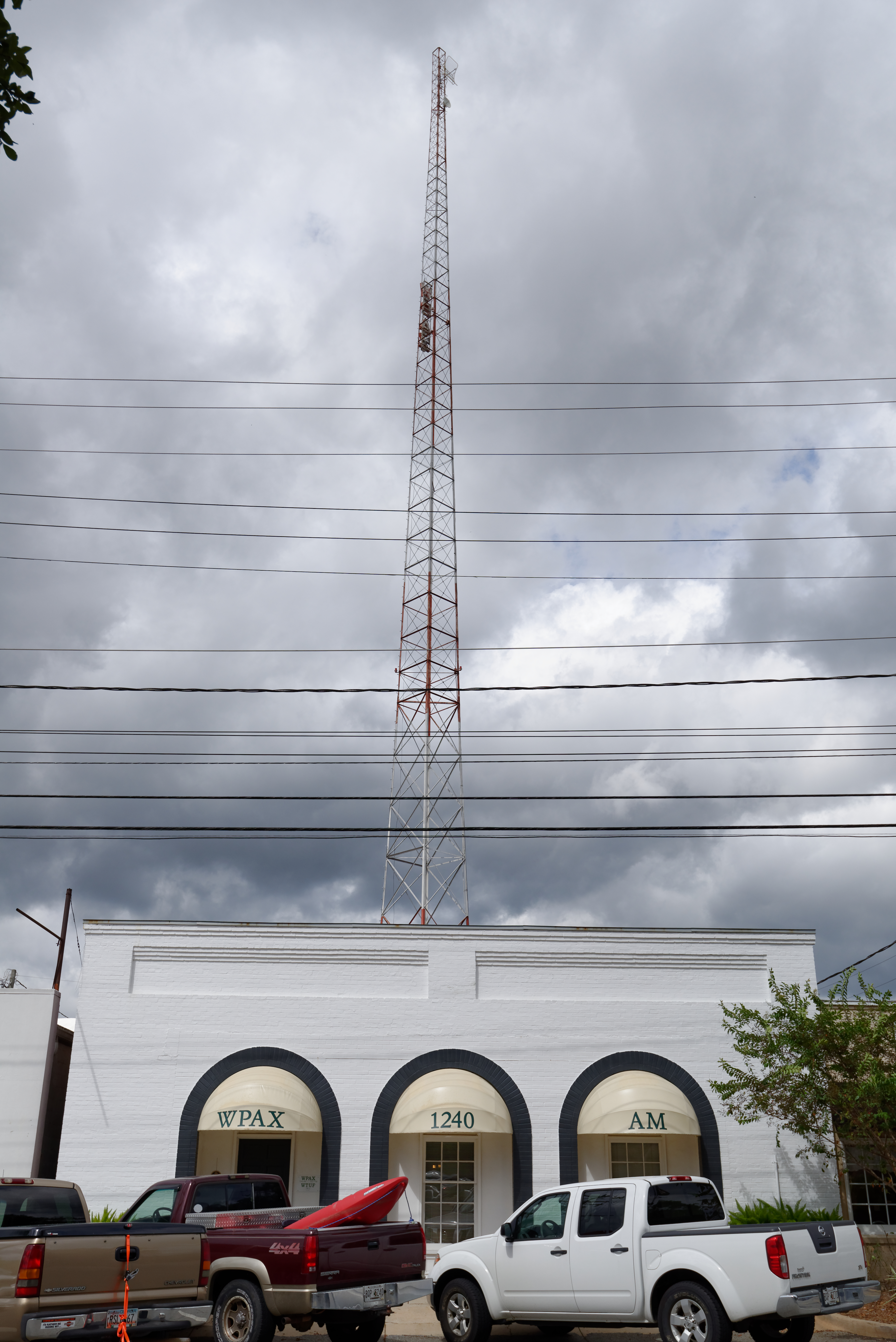
WPAX AM

=== Newspaper ===
- The Thomasville Times-Enterprise is a semi-weekly newspaper owned by Carpenter Media Group. The newspaper publishes the glossy magazine Thomasville Scene.

=== Radio ===
- WPAX 1240 AM
- WHGH
- WSTT

=== Television ===
WCTV (channel 6) is licensed to Thomasville and serves the Tallahassee, Florida–Thomasville market as an affiliate of CBS; channel 6.2 carries MeTV, channel 6.3 carries 365BLK, channel 6.4 carries Ion Television, channel 6.5 carries True Crime Network, channel 6.6 carries the independent and MyNetworkTV programming of Live Oak, Florida-licensed sister station WFXU (channel 57), channel 6.7 carries Shop LC.

== Infrastructure ==
The city has installed a fiber optic network, known as CNS, which provides affordable, high speed Internet access. The city's network has been in place since 1999. The city transfers excess revenues from CNS services and from its other utilities to the city's general fund to pay for police and fire protection, street maintenance, and other essential services. In 2012, because of these revenues, the city was able to eliminate property fire tax for its residents and businesses.

== Notable people ==
- William Andrews – NFL player for Atlanta Falcons
- Lloyd J. Austin – U.S. Army, former United States Secretary of Defense
- Stephanie Bentley – country music artist
- Mike Bobo – college football coach
- Elbridge Bryant – singer and one of the founding members of The Temptations
- Joe Burns – running back for the Georgia Tech Yellow Jackets and NFL's Buffalo Bills
- Benjamin Butterworth – U.S. Representative from Ohio
- Joelle Carter – actress
- Robert Carter (born 1994) - basketball player in the Israeli Basketball Premier League
- Tashard Choice – running back for Georgia Tech and NFL's Dallas Cowboys
- Reshard Cliett – NFL player
- Danny Copeland – NFL safety for Washington Redskins (Super Bowl XXVII championship team)
- Eric Curry – NFL player for Tampa Bay, Green Bay, and Jacksonville
- Henry Elrod – U.S. Marine captain, posthumously awarded Medal of Honor for actions on Wake Island, 1941
- Harris English – professional golfer
- Mary Lena Faulk – professional golfer, 1953 winner of US Women's Amateur Championship; one of the founders of the LPGA
- Henry Ossian Flipper – first African American graduate of West Point in 1877
- Myron Guyton – NFL safety for New York Giants and New England Patriots
- Emerson Hancock – MLB starting pitcher for the Seattle Mariners
- Raymond Hughes – conductor and Metropolitan Opera chorus master
- Clifford Ivory – NFL and CFL football player
- Shawn Jones – football player, quarterback for Georgia Tech including 1990 National Championship team, safety for the Minnesota Vikings
- Rolf Kauka – German cartoonist (died in Thomasville)
- William Alderman Linton – Presbyterian missionary and Korean independence activist
- Sam Madison – NFL defensive back for Miami Dolphins and New York Giants
- Guy McIntyre – NFL player for San Francisco 49ers, Green Bay Packers, Philadelphia Eagles
- Julie Moran – Journalist, television host, sportscaster; first female solo host for Wide World of Sports, weekend anchor and co-host for Entertainment Tonight
- Delia Owens - author
- Marcus Stroud – NFL defensive tackle
- Edward Thomas – gridiron football player
- Brandon Thompson – NFL player
- Dina Titus – member of the U.S. House of Representatives from Nevada's 1st District
- Theo Titus - Georgia state legislator, journalist, writer, and businessman
- Hurston Waldrep - pitcher in Atlanta Braves organization, recorded first win in MLB history in Tennessee
- Charlie Ward Jr. – Heisman Trophy-winning quarterback for Florida State football, basketball player for NBA's New York Knicks, assistant coach for Houston Rockets
- Bailey White – author
- Scott Wilson – actor
- Sheddrick Wilson – NFL player
- Joanne Woodward – Academy Award-winning actress, philanthropist, wife of actor Paul Newman
- Andrew Young – civil rights leader, minister, ambassador to the United Nations
