= Franklin, Douglas County, Kansas =

Franklin, Kansas
- Ghost town
- Interactive map of Franklin, Kansas
- Coordinates: 38°56′15″N 95°11′07″W
- Country: United States
- State: Kansas
- County: Douglas
- Founded: 1853
- Incorporated: 1857
- Elevation: 835 ft (255 m)

Population
  - Total: 0
- Time zone: UTC-6 (CST)
  - Summer (DST): UTC-5 (CDT)
- Area code: 785
- GNIS ID: 481879

Franklin is a ghost town in Douglas County, Kansas, United States. Established as a proslavery stronghold, the town played a key role in the "Bleeding Kansas" conflict that troubled the territory in the 1850s.

== Establishment ==
Franklin was founded in October 1853, making it one of the oldest towns to have been established in Douglas County. The settlement initially served as trading post, enabling Westerners to trade goods with the indigenous peoples in the area. When Kansas was officially opened up to western settlement after the passing of the Kansas-Nebraska Act, Franklin found itself inundated with settlers, most—if not all—of whom were from the nation's south. These settlers championed the pro-slavery cause and desired to see Kansas admitted into the Union as a slave state. By late 1855 Franklin had about a dozen homes and businesses and a post office. It soon became a center devoted to the expansion of slavery into Kansas.

Sheriff Samuel J. Jones headquartered himself and his cause in Franklin by spring 1856. While Jones was partially disabled by a sniper at that time, Franklin grew as a center for the pro-slavery cause in Kansas. By May 1856 three forts were built in Douglas County and a blockhouse, Franklin's Fort, was built inside Franklin. The blockhouse was used to store arms and a cannon seized during an attack on Lawrence on May 21. The blockhouse was built to be defended in the event of attack by free-state forces.

== Free-State attacks on Franklin ==
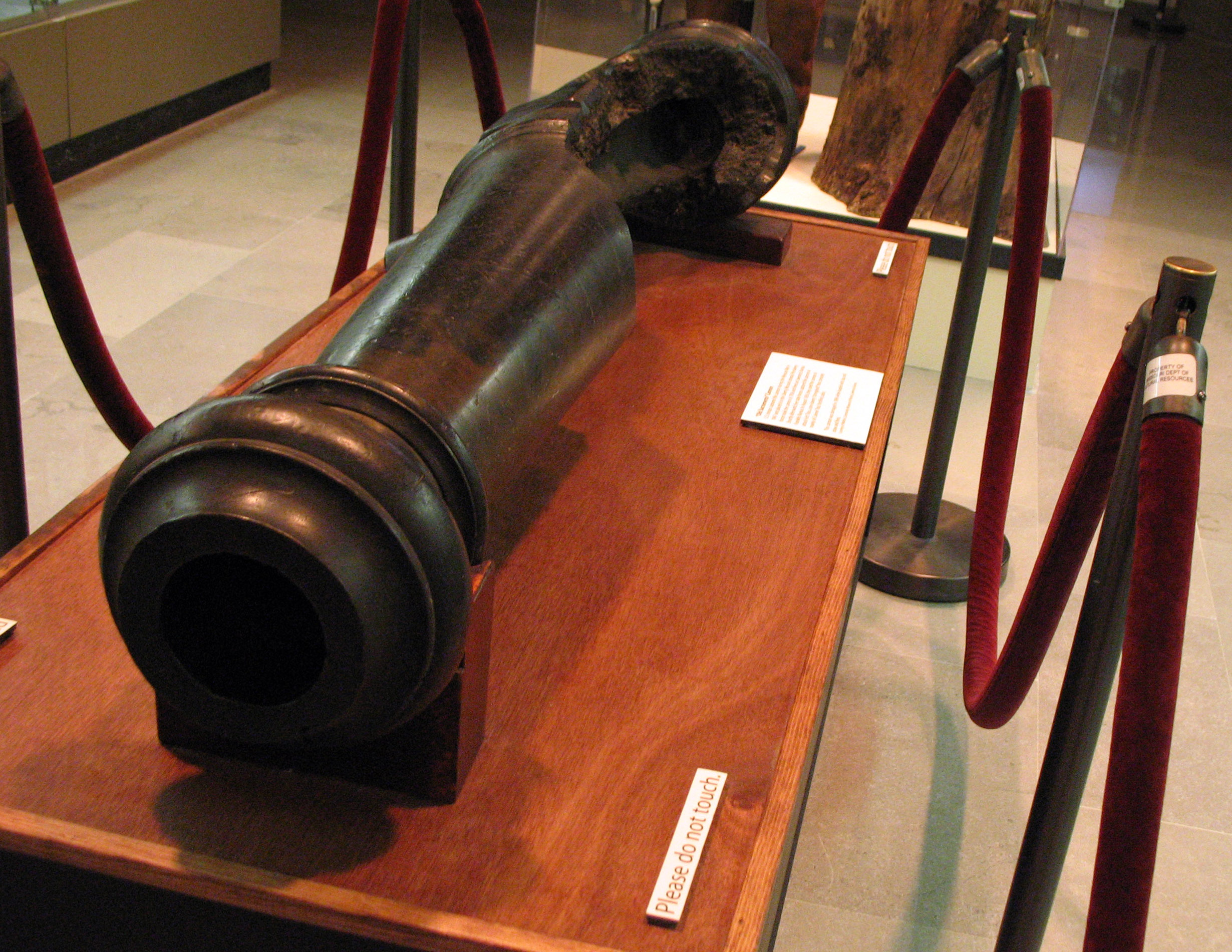
The "Old Sacramento" cannon was captured by free state partisans during the Second Battle of Franklin on August 12, 1856.

Two attacks were made on Franklin's Fort in 1856 during the summer. Free Staters during that time desired to rid the area of southern-oriented fortifications. The first attack was made on June 4 by about fifteen members of the Lawrence Stubbs, a free-state militia based in Lawrence. The free staters entered town after dark to search for "Old Sacramento," a cannon taken during a southern raid on Lawrence. Some defenders at the fort were aroused and what was termed the First Battle of Franklin erupted. During this battle the cannon was fired once and persons began firing at the free staters from houses in town, forcing their retreat. One Franklin man was fatally shot and a small number of persons were wounded. Some Franklin men may have been captured by the Lawrence men.

After this attack, Franklin's defenses were strengthened. The fort itself was made more defensible. On August 12 the Second Battle of Franklin took place. This time possibly two companies, at least 75 men, left Lawrence after dark to attack the town and fort. They were led by free-state leader James H. Lane. Apparently only about 20 men were defending Franklin. For several hours the opposing forces fired upon each other in the dark. Not much damage was done to either side at this point, but several free staters were wounded, as was one fort defender. One free stater was killed.

At some point a man was sent to travel to a company of U.S. cavalry camped approximately 5 miles (8.0 km) away and seek help. The cavalry could not reach Franklin until just before dawn. In the meantime things went badly for the fort's defenders, who had fought determinedly. The Lawrence attackers finally made progress when they set a wagon loaded with hay alight and moved it to the front door of the fort. The heat and light scared the defenders of the fort, who fled into the night. The free-staters then ransacked the fort, making away with weapons (including the "Old Sacramento Cannon"), food, and prisoners. After the battle, the fort was left, but this ended its use as a town defense, and it was converted into a residence soon after.

== Decline and abandonment ==
Although Franklin was incorporated in 1857, its importance to the pro-slavery cause had been greatly diminished. In the late 1850s and early 1860s, the town's political leanings changed; according to Daniel Fitzgerald, "[By 1861] Franklin residents who were adamant in their proslavery sentiments kept it to themselves, for the spirit of the community was decidedly antislavery." With this shift in politics came a shift in demographics, and in time, many African Americans came to live in the town. When the American Civil War broke out, Franklin mustered up 60 union recruits to serve in the war. On August 21, 1863, William C. Quantrill and about 400 guerrillas and Confederate Army recruits passed through Franklin on their way to raid Lawrence. One of the guerrilla leaders said a few soldiers in Union uniforms could be seen in town. One resident, Dr. R. L. Williams (who happened to have moved into the old fort in 1857), said he thought Quantrill's men were Union soldiers and no one took much notice of them, as they quickly passed through.

After Lawrence was attacked, many houses were moved from Franklin to Lawrence to help rebuild the burnt city. Bereft of dwellings, Franklin quickly faded away. The settlement's post office officially closed in 1867, and around this time a number of imposing structures, such as a hotel and a sawmill, were carted off elsewhere. The old stone fort (which served as Dr. Williams residence for a number of years) remained for a long while the most prominent remnant of the settlement. By 1900, those living in the area had to exert "considerable labor" to fill up derelict wells and exposed cellar pits from the houses that had once stood on the site. Around 1912, the stone fort was finally razed, and on October 30, 1927, the Kansas City Journal-Post wrote that "only fertile fields mark [the] spot where [the] famous Kansas town stood."

Today, the area once occupied by Franklin is within the city limits of Lawrence and, as Legends of Kansas notes, is but a suburb of the latter city. A road in this general area is also known as "Franklin Road".
