= Lawrence USD 497 =

Public school district in Lawrence, Kansas

Address
- 110 McDonald Dr. Lawrence, Kansas, 66044; United States
- Coordinates: 38°57′36″N 95°15′12″W

District information
- Type: Public
- Grades: PreK to 12
- Established: 1965
- Schools: 22

Students and staff
- Students: 11,427
- Teachers: 887.6 (FTE)
- Student–teacher ratio: 12.87

Other information
- Website: usd497.org

Lawrence USD 497 is a public unified school district headquartered in Lawrence, Kansas, United States. The district includes the communities of Lawrence (most), Clinton, Pleasant Grove, and nearby rural areas. It was organized in 1965 and currently serves 11,427 students from pre-Kindergarten to grade 12 and maintains an early childhood center (pre-k), 13 elementary schools, four middle schools, two high schools, a K-12 virtual school, and an adult learning center.

== Boundary ==
Most of the district is in Douglas County, small portions are located in Leavenworth County and Jefferson County.

== School board ==
USD 497 is currently served by seven elected officials who serve a four-year term without salary.

== Schools ==
The school district operates the following schools:

High schools

- Lawrence Free State High School
- Lawrence High School

Middle schools

- Liberty Memorial Central Middle School
- Billy Mills Middle School
- Southwest Middle School
- West Middle School

Elementary schools

- Cordley
- Deerfield
- Hillcrest
- Langston Hughes
- New York
- Prairie Park
- Quail Run
- Schwegler
- Sunflower
- Sunset Hill
- Woodlawn

Additional services

- Lawrence Virtual Schools, a K–12 and high school program located in former Centennial Elementary School
- Adult Learning Center, helps adult obtain a GED, located in the Lawrence High School annex
- Lawrence Diploma-Completion Program, helps adult obtain a Lawrence High, Free State or Perry-Lecompton high school diploma, located in the Malls Shopping Center
- The Lawrence College & Career Center, Which offers opportunities for high school students to earn college credits and take classes to prepare them for various careers.
- Kennedy Early Childhood Center, which houses Tiny-K Early Intervention, early childhood special education, at-risk pre-k, and other community early childhood programs.

Former schools in Lawrence

Former schools in the Lawrence area include:

- Lake View School
- Sigel School
- No. 6 School
- Pleasant Valley School
- Franklin School
- Barker School
- Bracket School
- Learnard School
- White School
- Oak Hill School
- Bismarck School
- Riggs School
- Model School
- Lane School
- Quincy School
- Vermont School
- Lawrence High School (1890-1923, moved to Liberty Memorial High School, now Liberty Memorial Central Middle School),
- McAllister School
- Centennial Elementary
- East Heights Elementary
- India Elementary
- Kaw Valley Elementary
- Grant Elementary
- Wakarusa Valley Elementary
- Kennedy Elementary
- Riverside Elementary
- Broken Arrow Elementary
- Pinckney Elementary

== See also ==
- Kansas State Department of Education
- Kansas State High School Activities Association
- List of high schools in Kansas
- List of unified school districts in Kansas
