= Keenan Garber =

American football player (born 2000)

Profile
- Position: Cornerback

Personal information
- Born: July 22, 2000 (age 26); Lawrence, Kansas, U.S.
- Listed height: 6 ft 0 in (1.83 m)
- Listed weight: 188 lb (85 kg)

Career information
- High school: Lawrence Free State
- College: Kansas State (2019–2024)
- NFL draft: 2025: undrafted

Career history
- Minnesota Vikings (2025)*; Indianapolis Colts (2025)*; Detroit Lions (2025)*; New York Jets (2026)*
- * Offseason or practice squad member only
- Stats at Pro Football Reference

Keenan Garber (born July 22, 2000) is an American professional football cornerback. He played college football for the Kansas State Wildcats and was signed as an undrafted free agent by the Minnesota Vikings of the National Football League (NFL) in 2025.

== Early life ==
Garber was born July 22, 2000, in Lawrence, Kansas. He attended Lawrence Free State High School and played wide receiver and running back on the school's football team, scoring 17 touchdowns in his career. He also played defensive back, recording four interceptions, two of which he returned for touchdowns. In 2018, Garber was named first-team all-state by The Topeka Capital-Journal, The Wichita Eagle, and the Kansas Football Coaches Association. He was ranked the third-best high school football player in Kansas in the class of 2019 by ESPN.

== College career ==
Garber played college football for the Kansas State Wildcats for six seasons, from 2019 to 2024, initially as a wide receiver. He redshirted in 2019 after playing in one game. He played in six games in 2020, recording two receptions for ten yards and two rushes for two yards. In 2021, he played in 12 games, recording four receptions for 72 yards and one rush for four yards.

Garber played in all 14 games in 2022, playing on special teams and changing positions from wide receiver to cornerback near the end of the season. He asked head coach Chris Klieman for the position change after his lack of success at wide receiver. Garber recorded his first career tackle in the 2022 Big 12 championship game, in which Kansas State defeated the TCU Horned Frogs.

In 2023, Garber played in all 13 games at cornerback, starting in five. He recorded 22 tackles, one tackle for loss, five pass breakups, and one interception, which he returned for a touchdown.

Granted an extra year of NCAA eligibility due to the COVID-19 pandemic, Garber played in all 13 games in 2024, with 12 starts. He recorded 29 tackles, six pass breakups, and one interception.

Garber earned a degree in social sciences from Kansas State University.

== Professional career ==
Pre-draft measurables
Height	Weight	Arm length	Hand span	Wingspan	40-yard dash	10-yard split	20-yard split	20-yard shuttle	Three-cone drill	Vertical jump	Broad jump	Bench press
5 ft 11 1/8 in (1.81 m)	192 lb (87 kg)	30 1/8 in (0.77 m)	9 in (0.23 m)	6 ft 2 1/2 in (1.89 m)	4.50 s	1.54 s	2.54 s	4.15 s	6.70 s	39.5 in (1.00 m)	10 ft 6 in (3.20 m)	18 reps
All values from Pro Day

=== Minnesota Vikings ===
After going unselected in the 2025 NFL draft, Garber signed with the Minnesota Vikings as an undrafted free agent. He was released by the Vikings at the end of the offseason.

=== Indianapolis Colts ===
On October 2, 2025, the Indianapolis Colts signed Garber to the team's practice squad. He was released by the Colts on October 21.

=== Detroit Lions ===
On December 16, 2025, the Detroit Lions signed Garber to their practice squad.

=== New York Jets ===
On August 18, 2026, Garber was signed by the New York Jets. He was waived by the Jets as a part of final roster cuts on August 30.
