= Pleasant Grove, Kansas =

- Unincorporated community
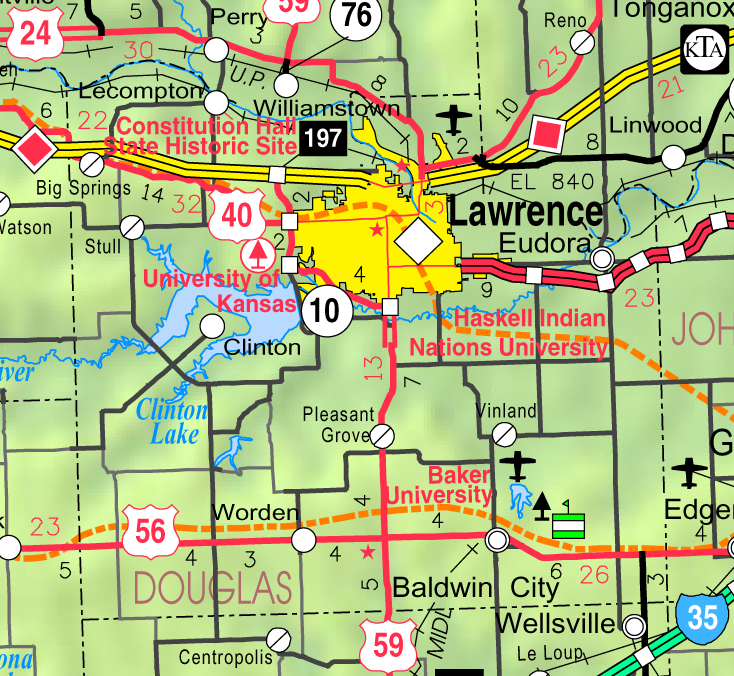
- KDOT map of Douglas County (legend)

- Location within Kansas Location within the United States
- Coordinates: 38°51′20″N 95°16′11″W
- Country: United States
- State: Kansas
- County: Douglas
- Founded: 1850s
- Elevation: 1,083 ft (330 m)
- Time zone: UTC-6 (CST)
  - Summer (DST): UTC-5 (CDT)
- Area code: 785
- FIPS code: 20-56350
- GNIS ID: 479511

Pleasant Grove is an unincorporated community in Douglas County, Kansas, United States. It is located four miles south of Lawrence.

== History ==
According to the Lawrence Journal-World, it is believed that the first organized Douglas County German Baptist group met in Pleasant Grove in 1858, in the house of Stephen Studebaker. Several years later, during Quantrill's Raid, William Quantrill and his men came close to Pleasant Grove after pillaging Lawrence. However, because many of the raiders were drunk and loud, the townsfolk were alerted to the raiders' presence. Nevertheless, Quantrill and his men razed a number of houses and barns in the area, looking for any anti-slavery settlers.

In 1877, the first German Baptist meeting house in the state of Kansas was built in the town.

It had a post office from 1875 until 1900.

In 1912, the small town had a population of 45 and received rural free delivery mail from nearby Baldwin City.

== Education ==
The community is served by Lawrence USD 497 public school district.
