= Atlantic (1848 ship) =

American steamboat which sank in 1852

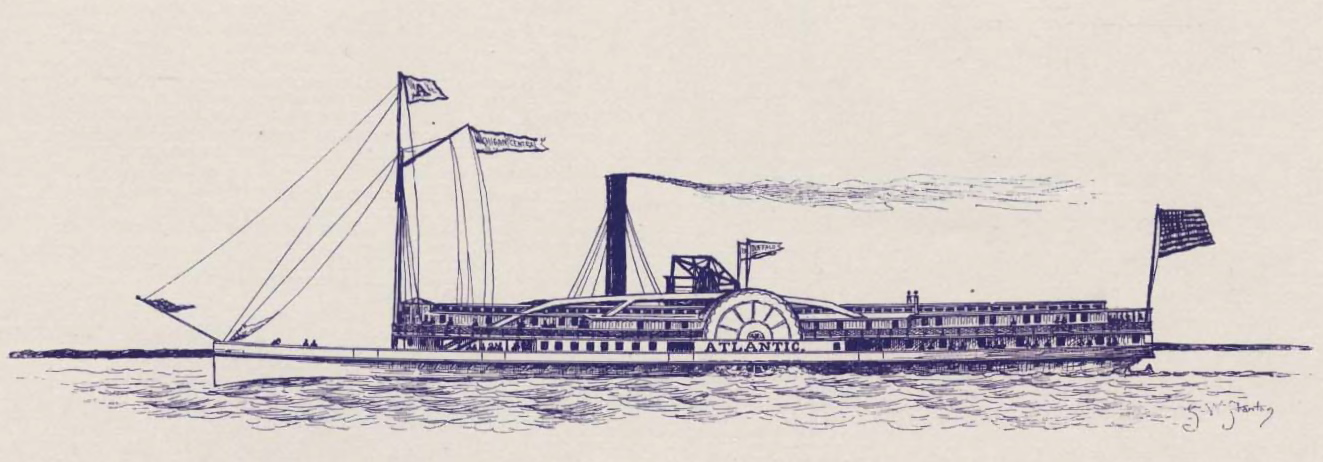

History
- Owner: E. B. Ward, Detroit or E. B. and S. Ward, St. Clair
- Builder: J. L. Wolverton
- Completed: 1848 or 1849
- In service: May 1849
- Out of service: 1852
- Fate: Sunk after collision, 20 August 1852

General characteristics
- Tonnage: 1155 tons
- Length: 267 feet (81 m)
- Beam: 33 feet (10 m)
- Depth: 12.5 feet (3.8 m)
- Capacity: 300+ passengers

Atlantic was a steamboat that sank in Lake Erie after a collision with the steamer Ogdensburg on 20 August 1852, with the loss of at least 150 but perhaps as many as 300 lives. The loss of life made this disaster, in terms of loss of life from the sinking of a single vessel, the fifth-worst tragedy in the history of the Great Lakes.

== Construction and career ==
Atlantic was built in 1848 or 1849 in Newport, Michigan, now called Marine City, by J. L. Wolverton. Atlantic was relatively large for the time, 267 feet (81 m) long with a tonnage of 1,155 tons, a beam of 33 feet (10 m), and a depth of 12.5 feet (3.8 m). She had 85 staterooms and a capacity of over 300 passengers.

Atlantic was owned by E. B. Ward of Detroit, or E. B. and S. Ward of St. Clair, Michigan and operated by the Michigan Central Railroad. She was put into service making trips between Buffalo, New York and Detroit, Michigan; she set a speed record of 16 and a half hours for a trip between the two cities.

== Final voyage ==
On the afternoon of 19 August 1852, Atlantic left Buffalo, heading for Detroit, under the command of Captain J. Byron Pettey. Every cabin was full, and over 250 passengers were on the deck, many Norwegian, Irish, or other European immigrants. Atlantic stopped at Erie, Pennsylvania to pick up even more Norwegian immigrants waiting for ships to take them west to Detroit. Around half of the immigrants waiting were taken aboard; roughly seventy had to be left behind due to lack of space. Atlantic was now dangerously overcrowded, with 500–600 people aboard; the ship's clerk did not keep an exact count. Baggage was piled on the deck, and passengers stayed wherever they could, including on the uppermost hurricane deck and the roof of Atlantic's cabin. At 11 pm on 19 August 1852, Atlantic left Erie. The lake was calm; the sources are unclear about the level of visibility, with reports indicating everything from a light mist to a heavy fog.

Meanwhile, the new propeller steamer Ogdensburg was heading the other way, from Cleveland, Ohio, to Ogdensburg, New York, carrying a load of wheat. At 2 am on 20 August 1852, the paths of the two ships crossed near Long Point. On board Ogdensburg, the first mate, Degrass McNeil, was on duty. He spotted the lights from Atlantic but was sure that Ogdensburg would pass at least a half mile ahead of the other ship. But then Atlantic changed course, turning north as though trying to pass in front of Ogdensburg. McNeil ordered Ogdensburg's engines reversed and the ship turned to port, and since Ogdensburg's steam whistle was broken, McNeil ran out onto the ship's deck and yelled to try and get the other ship to turn to starboard.

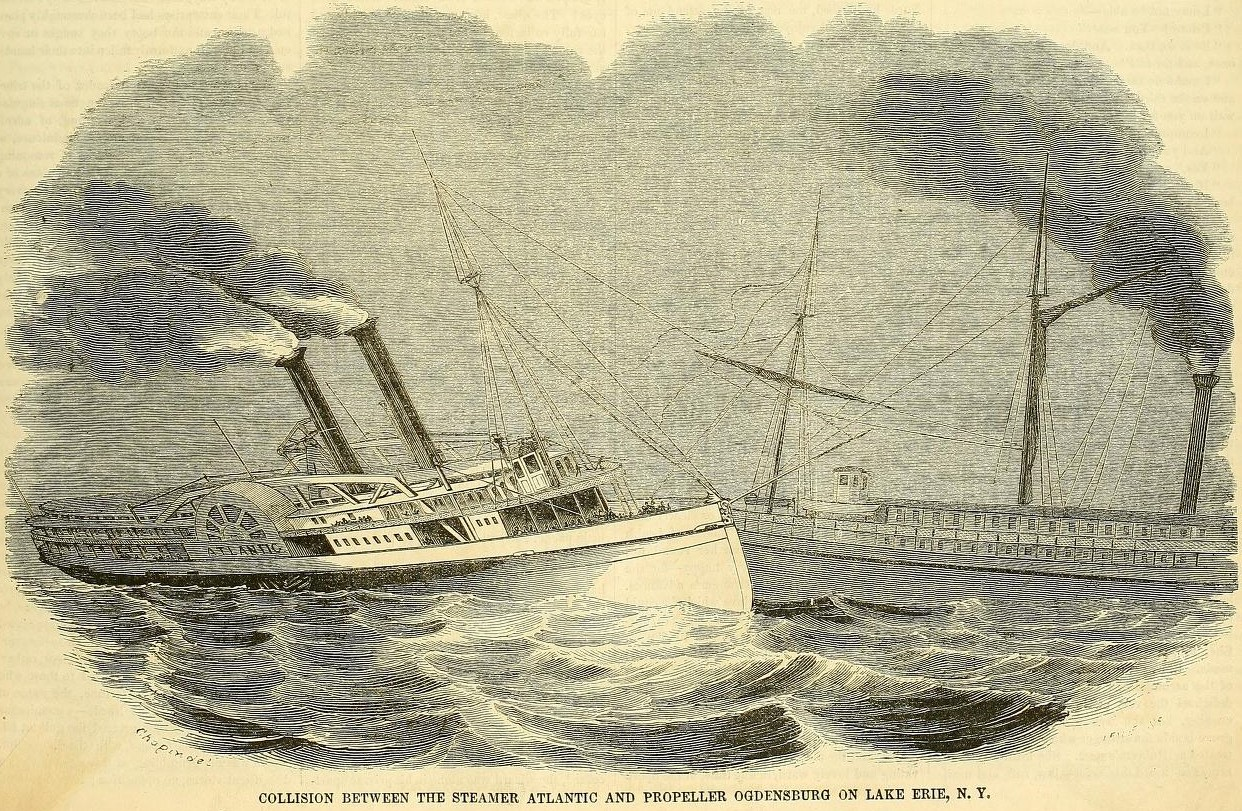
Atlantic and Ogdensburg collide. From an illustration for Gleason's Pictorial

McNeil's actions came too late. Ogdensburg rammed Atlantic on the port side, forward of the paddlewheel, cutting into Atlantic's side down to the waterline. Ogdensburg reversed and backed away from Atlantic, while Atlantic continued away under full steam. Perhaps reassured by Atlantic steaming away, McNeil steered Ogdensburg back onto its regular course. Many passengers on Atlantic were awakened by the collision, but the crew of Atlantic made no effort to alert all the passengers. Water flowing in through the hole in Atlantic soon flooded the boilers, bringing the ship to a halt. The passengers and crew began to panic, many throwing anything that would float over the side of the ship before jumping over the side themselves, where many drowned. An attempt was made to launch Atlantic's three boats; one capsized, and Captain Petty suffered a concussion while lowering another, leaving him unable to provide any more assistance. The two other boats were lowered, carrying mostly crew members. The bow of Atlantic began to sink, but the stern was kept above water by air trapped inside the ship.

Meanwhile, the crew of Ogdensburg realized that Atlantic was in trouble, either because Ogdensburg's Captain Richardson reached that conclusion after examining the damage to his ship, or because the crew of Ogdensburg, after stopping their ship to check for damage, heard screams coming from the sinking Atlantic. Ogdensburg turned around and found the half-sunk Atlantic ten minutes later; her crew took survivors off Atlantic's stern and rescued others from the water. Shortly after Ogdensburg took the last survivors off of the deck of Atlantic, Atlantic sank completely. The ship did not carry detailed passenger lists, but estimates range from at least 130 lives lost up to 300 lives lost, with an estimated death toll of 250 being common.

This account is from Amund Eidsmoe’s story of his own life from Hjalmar Rued Holand’s The Norwegian Settler’s Story. Amund was born in 1814 and emigrated to the U.S. with his wife and two children in 1852.

"A large number of people and goods of every description were now crowded together into a large boat called the “Atlantic”. At eleven o’clock [pm] it moved off on Lake Erie. There were many people and all wanted to find a place to sleep. As many as found room went down into the cabins but many had to prepare their beds upon the deck. I and my family were among the latter. The deck was crowded with every conceivable thing; emigrant’s baggage, new wagons, and such other stuff. So we lay down to rest but sleep was not of long duration. When it was near midnight we were awakened by a load crash and saw a large beam fall down upon a Norwegian woman of our company. It crushed several bones and completely tore the head of a little baby that lay at her side. Another ship had collided with ours and knocked a large hole in the side of the Atlantic so that a flood of water rushed into the cabins and people came up as thick and fast as they could crowd themselves. It seemed as if even the wrath of the Almighty had a hand in the destruction. The sailors became absolutely raving, and tried to get as many killed as possible. When they saw the people crowded up they struck them on the heads and shoulders to drive them down again. When this did not help, they took and raised the stairway up on end so the people fell down backwards again. Then they jerked the ladder up onto the deck. All hopes were gone for them that were underneath. Water filled the rooms and life was no more. People rushed frantically from one end of the ship to the other. The trap doors were torn open and goods and people swept into the water. Then was the life of a person of little value.

My wife and children and I were miraculously saved, although we also came into the water, but were picked up by the other ship. When I discovered that all of my family were alive, I was as full of joy as if I had become the richest man in the world, despite the fact that we had lost all of our goods. We had lost all but our lives, but that they were precious we now realized. An account of the catastrophe’s cause came from one of our newspapers and is as follows:

‘Atlantic sailed from Buffalo in the evening at eleven o’clock and came in sight of the Propeller Ogdensburg that belonged to a competitive company. Between these there was a bitter enmity and the captain of the Atlantic became desirous of running over the Ogdensburg and sinking it. All the lights were turned out so that the act of running down the rival company’s boat would be unnoticed. At the last moment the Ogdensburg had time to turn hastily aside to escape the Atlantic and advance a short distance, but in anger at this attack the Ogdensburg turned and with a mighty spring, pushed a big hole in the Atlantic’s side so that the water soon caused the ship to sink. The loss of life is estimated at about three hundred of whom sixty were Norwegians. A trial of the officers of each ship was held with the result that the Atlantic was blamed for the misfortune.’"

== Aftermath ==
Ogdensburg steamed to the nearest port, which was Erie, Pennsylvania. While there, a group of passengers met and issued a resolution. In it, they condemned the incompetence of the officers of Atlantic with the exception of the clerk, Mr. Givon. They also spoke out against the poor quality of the life preservers on Atlantic and commended the captain of Ogdensburg for returning to the scene.

Among the survivors of the disaster was Henry T. Titus, future founder of Titusville, Florida.

== The wreck ==
Atlantic rests mostly intact under 150 feet (46 m) of water near Long Point. That fall, diver John Green was hired by American Express to dive the wreck and retrieve Atlantic's safe and money known to be in a cabin, but his attempts failed. In 1855, Green returned with the schooner Yorktown, located the safe, and moved it out to the deck of Atlantic. But Green contracted a near-fatal case of the bends and was taken to a hospital; he was in recovery until the summer of 1856. When he returned to the wreck on 1 July 1856, he found the safe and money were gone. Another diver, Eliot Harrington, had found them both and hauled them to the surface. $36,700 was taken from Atlantic's safe, at a time when a decent wage was a dollar a day. American Express went to court for the money; the ending settlement gave Harrington and the four others who worked with him a bit under $2,000 each, with American Express taking the rest.

The legal battle over the cause of the wreck went to the United States Supreme Court, who ruled that both ships were at fault. In 1867, the Western Wrecking Company was formed to try and raise Atlantic, but this plan was abandoned two years later.

The wreck was rediscovered in 1984 by Port Dover, Ontario diver Michael Lynn Fletcher; the aquatic plants formerly covering the wreck were largely eaten away by zebra mussels. In 1991, a California-based diving company, Mar-Dive, announced that they had found Atlantic, and paid the state of Ohio $14,000 to reform the Western Wrecking Company. But since Atlantic rests inside Canadian waters, the government of Ontario moved to prevent the removal of artifacts from Atlantic, taking the issue to Ontario divisional court. The judge ruled that Atlantic belonged to Ontario. To protect the wreck, an electronic monitoring system was installed that will alert the Ontario Provincial Police if a vessel stays for too long above the wreck.
