= Twin Mound, Kansas =

- Ghost town
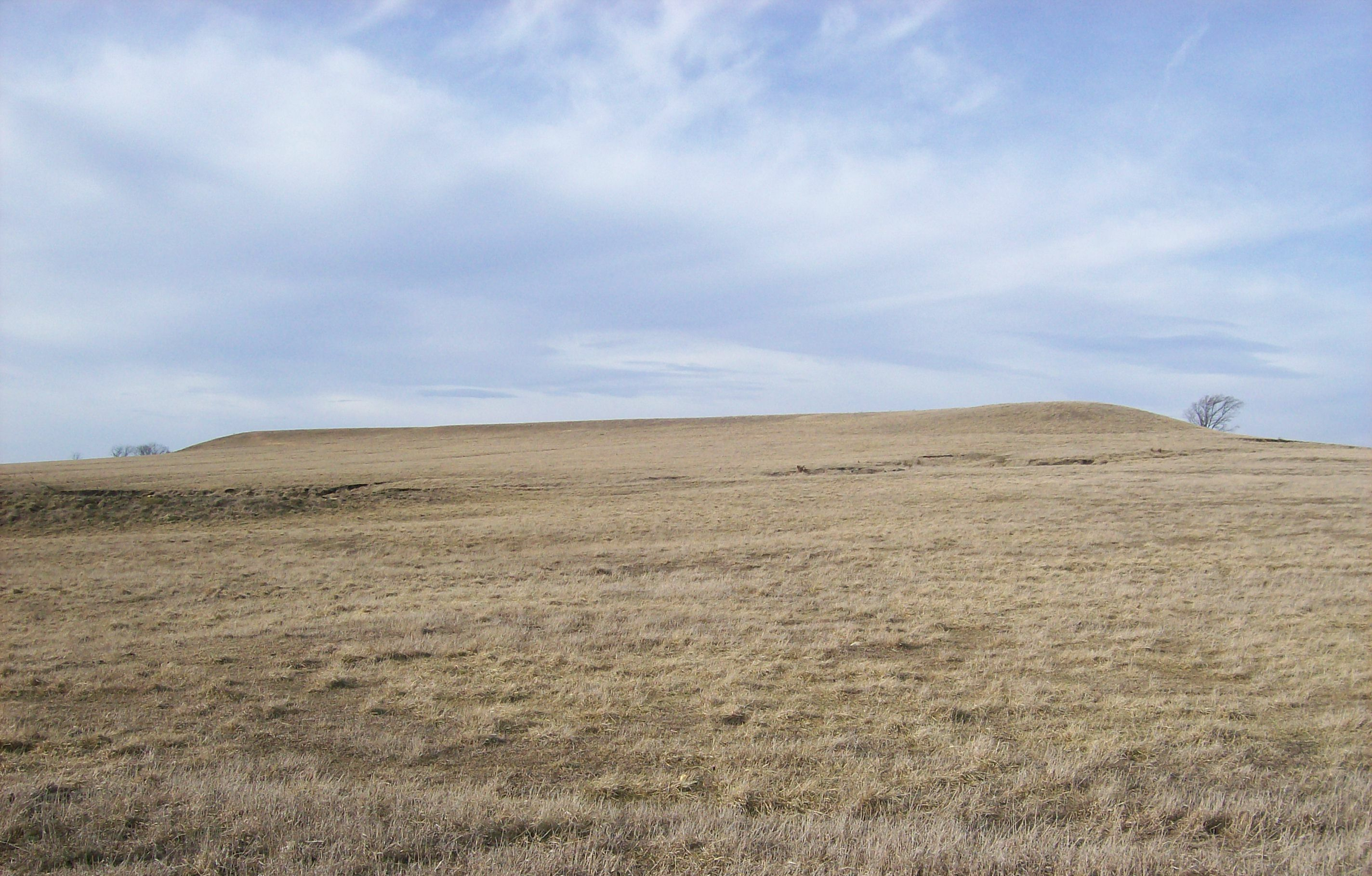
- Twin Mound

- Location within Kansas
- Coordinates: 38°51′37″N 95°28′54″W
- Country: United States
- State: Kansas
- County: Douglas
- Elevation: 1,056 ft (322 m)

Population
  - Total: 0
- Time zone: UTC-6 (CST)
  - Summer (DST): UTC-5 (CDT)
- Area code: 785
- GNIS ID: 482172

Twin Mound is a ghost town in western Douglas County, Kansas, United States. It was named for two natural mounds that rise gently from the landscape.

== History ==
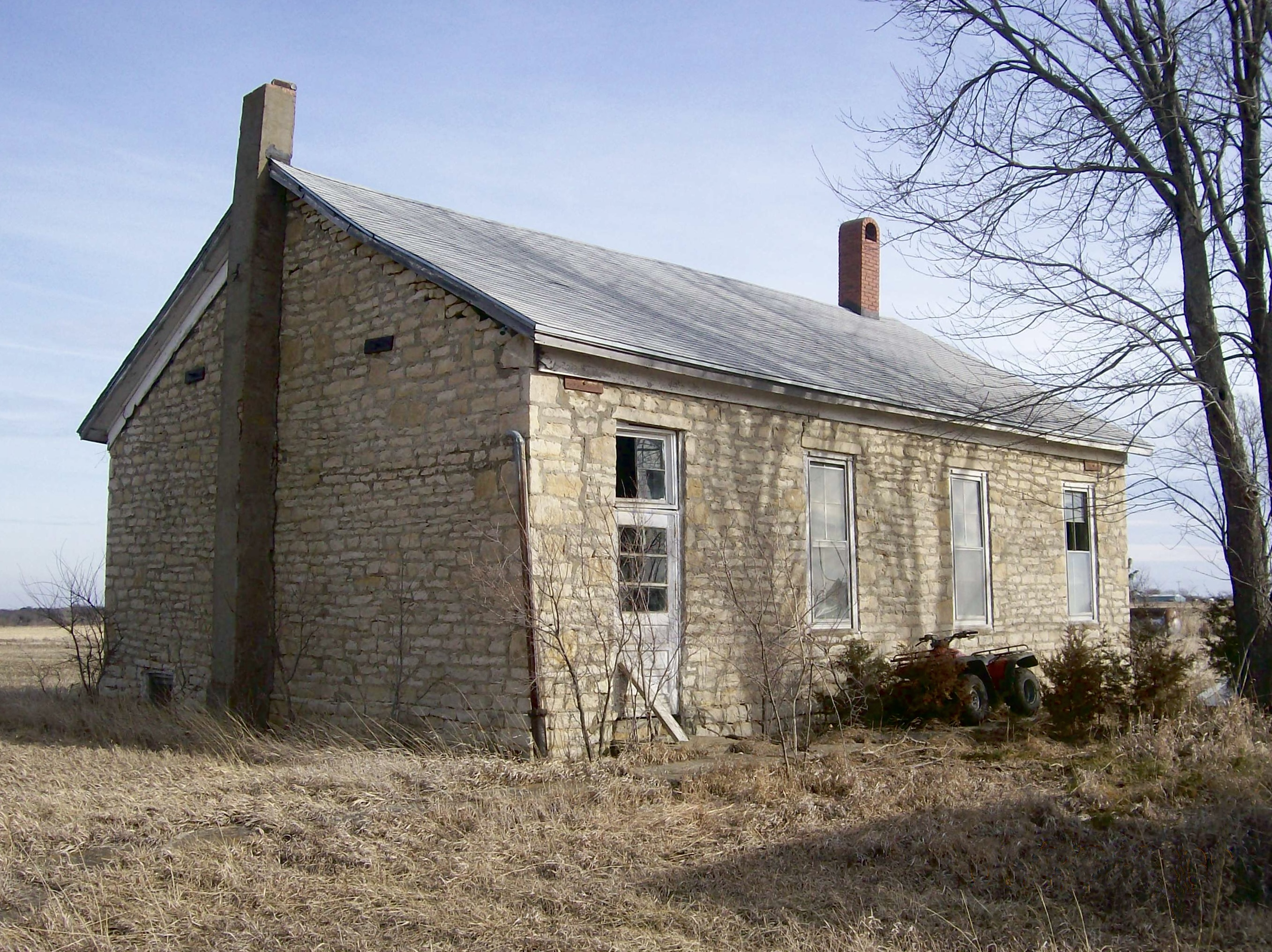
Twin Mound School in 2008. The structure is the last standing building in Twin Mound and the last one-room school consolidated in Douglas County.

Henry Hiatt was born in Dublin, Indiana, in 1816. In 1856, Hiatt, his wife and five children moved to Kansas Territory, settling in Bloomington. Shortly after his arrival, Hiatt and two other men operated a saw mill, but within a year Hiatt decided to move on and transported his family seven miles southwest. The two nearly identical mounds inspired Hiatt, for he settled in the area and founded his own community, Twin Mounds.

Hiatt gave no explanation as to why he left Bloomington, but Hiatt resented the power of organized church in American society, preferring Confucius' version of the Golden Rule and possibly objected to the regulations the Bloomington Town Company was imposing on the residents. Hiatt was, to a large degree, an anarchist. Hiatt died in 1900 and was buried in a homemade coffin in Twin Mound Cemetery, a cemetery he started in 1858 when his first wife died.

Eventually the s was dropped from the town name. The small farming community was growing steadily and Hiatt had big plans for the town. He began talking up the Twin Mounds Harmonic College which would teach science, facts and laws; not sect, doctrine, nature or creed. The college would also be open to all races, creeds and sexes. The reason Hiatt failed in this venture may possibly have been due to Hiatt's lack of experience and going up against stronger opposition, who wanted a university in Lawrence.

The Twin Mound post office, opened in 1858, was discontinued in 1903.

The townsite remains a small farming community. All that remains is the one-room schoolhouse, the cemetery and the two mounds.
