= Lawrence Free State High School =

Location
- 4700 Overland Drive; Lawrence, Kansas 66049; United States; 38.975138°N 95.303650°W

Information
- School type: Public, high school
- Established: 1997
- School district: Lawrence USD 497
- CEEB code: 171691
- Principal: Amy McAnarney
- Teaching staff: 82.69 (FTE)
- Grades: 9 to 12
- Gender: coed
- Enrollment: 1,768 (2023–2024)
- Student to teacher ratio: 21.38
- Schedule: 8:00am-3:15pm
- Hours in school day: 7
- Campus type: Urban
- Colors: Hunter green Silver
- Slogan: Respect, Responsibility, and Excellence
- Song: "We Hail Thee Lawrence Free State"
- Fight song: "Fight On, Firebirds!"
- Athletics: KSHSAA Class 6A
- Athletics conference: Sunflower League
- Mascot: Freddy the Firebird
- Team name: Firebirds
- Rival: Lawrence High School
- Newspaper: The Free Press
- Yearbook: The Talon
- Communities served: Lawrence
- Website: Website

Lawrence Free State High School (FSHS or LFS) is a public secondary school in Lawrence, Kansas, United States. It is operated by Lawrence USD 497 school district, and serves students in grades 9 to 12. It is one of two public high schools within the city limits of Lawrence. The school colors are hunter green, garnet red, and silver. The current principal is Amy McAnarney.

Lawrence Free State is a member of the Kansas State High School Activities Association (KSHSAA) and offers a variety of sports programs. Athletic teams compete in the 6A division and are known as the "Firebirds". Extracurricular activities are also offered in the form of performing arts, school publications, and clubs.

== History ==
Lawrence Free State was established in 1997 in response to overcrowding at Lawrence High School, the only public high school in Lawrence at the time. Almost one-third of students at Lawrence High transferred to Free State at the start of the 1997 school year.

== Academics ==
The College Board recognized Free State High with the 2007-08 Siemens Award for Advanced Placement Participation and Performance. One high school in each state receives this honor and a $1,000 grant for math and science education. Free State's fine arts department received the 2019-2020 KSHSAA Performing Arts School of Excellence award.

== Extracurricular activities ==
The Firebirds compete in the Sunflower League and are classified as a 6A school, the largest classification in Kansas according to the Kansas State High School Activities Association. Throughout its history, Lawrence Free State has won twenty-nine state championships in various sports and activities. Some graduates have gone on to participate at the collegiate and professional levels.

=== Athletic programs ===
From the school's inception in 1997 until 2008, football games were played at Haskell Memorial Stadium. Some games were also played at Memorial Stadium at the University of Kansas. Games are now played in a home stadium built in 2009–2010, when a stadium was built for Lawrence High School as well.

Fall sports

Boys' cross country, girls' cross country, gymnastics, boys' soccer, girls' tennis, football, girls' golf, volleyball, competitive cheer, dance, and girls' flag football

Winter sports

Boys' basketball, girls' basketball, boys' bowling, girls' bowling, boys' swim and dive, boys' wrestling, cheer, dance, and girls' wrestling

Spring sports

Baseball, softball, boys' golf, girls' soccer, boys' tennis, girls' swim and dive, boys' track and field, and girls' track and field

=== Non-athletic programs ===
==== Music Program ====
Free State's music program is recognized as a top program throughout the state of Kansas. The Free State chamber choir, advanced treble choir (Aurora), and concert chorale have all received "I" Ratings at KSHSAA every year since their inception in 1997.

==== Theatre ====
Free State's theatre program is regionally recognized, and has performed shows such as Fiddler on the Roof, The Pajama Game, and Anything Goes. The theatre program performed at the Kansas Thespian Festival in Wichita in 2019 and was named a Gold Honor Troupe there. They were chosen again for Main Stage Adjudication in 2025 to perform The Addams Family: School Edition at the 2026 Kansas Thespian Festival.

==== Marching Band ====
The Free State marching band were grand champions at the Missouri Western State University Tournament of Champions in 2000, 2001, and 2002, in addition to being finalists at the University of Central Missouri Festival of Champions in 2006 and 2007, and the Kansas Bandmasters Marching Championships in 2015. In 2024, They also won First Place Overall in Andover, Kansas In 2026, The Free State marching band performed at the Wichita Marching Band competition at Washburn University and placed 1st in drum majors, 1st in drumline, and scored an overall 1.

==== Orchestra ====
The Free State orchestra traveled to Los Angeles in early 2019.

==== Awards ====
In the fall of 2019, Free State won the KSHSAA Performing Arts School of Excellence Award for success in Choir, Band, Orchestra, Theater, Debate, and Forensics. They won a second time in 2025, becoming the first school to win this award twice.

==== Scholars Bowl ====
In 2017, Free State's Scholars Bowl team placed first in the 6A division state championship tournament.

==== Debate ====
In 2022, debate became the first extracurricular activity at Free State to win a National Championship by winning the 2022 Tournament of Champions.

=== State championships ===
State championships
Season	Sport	Number of championships	Year
Fall	Gymnastics, girls'	5	2009 (co-champions), 2011, 2013, 2014, 2020
Fall	Cross country, girls'	2	2013, 2016
Fall	Cross country, boys'	1	2020
Winter	Swimming and diving, boys'	1	2004
Winter	Debate	3	2007 (four-speaker), 2019 (two-speaker), 2025 (four-speaker)
Winter	Scholars' bowl	1	2017
Spring	Speech	7	2019, 2021, 2022, 2023, 2024, 2025, 2026
Spring	Baseball	3	2006, 2015, 2025
Spring	Softball	2	2018, 2019
Spring	Track and field, girls'	2	2013, 2014
Spring	Swimming and diving, girls'	3	2009, 2015, 2023
Total		29	

== Notable alumni ==
- Spencer Lott (2006) A puppeteer who did work for the Jim Henson Company
- Christian Ballard (2007), former defensive end for the Minnesota Vikings
- Cody Kukuk (2011), former baseball player drafted by the Boston Red Sox
- Scott Frantz (2015) American former college football player who was an offensive tackle for the Kansas State Wildcats
- Keenan Garber (2019), NFL cornerback for the Detroit Lions
- Zac Thornton (2020), baseball player in the New York Mets organization

== See also ==
- List of high schools in Kansas
- List of unified school districts in Kansas
