= Fort Titus =

Coordinates: 39.0114°N 95.3940°W

- south of Lecompton, Kansas

Site information
- Type: partisan fort
- Controlled by: Henry T. Titus

Site history
- Built: ca. April 1856
- In use: ca. April 1856 - August 16, 1856
- Materials: logs, wood

Garrison information
- Garrison: about 18 men

Fort Titus was the fortress residence of pro-slavery advocate Henry T. Titus, built in Kansas in April 1856, during a period when forces aligned with Titus came into conflict with free-state settlers. The wider conflict, which emerged from a political and ideological debate over the legality of slavery in the proposed state of Kansas, became known as Bleeding Kansas.

== Construction ==
Fort Titus was built about April 1856 to be the fortress home of Henry T. Titus, a colonel in the militia of the southern-oriented government of Kansas Territory. It was said Titus squatted on the claim of a free-state settler while he was away and built his cabin on this land. Fort Titus was a fortified log cabin with gun loopholes built into its walls to allow it to be defended from the inside. This fort had at least one window and it had a small log addition on the north side that served as a kitchen.

== Battle of Fort Titus ==
In August 1856 Camp Sacket, a U.S. Army post, was about a mile away from Fort Titus. Fort Saunders, some distance south of Fort Titus, was destroyed by free-state partisans on August 15, 1856. At 2 a.m. on August 16 southern partisans, including Henry T. Titus, attacked the fortress home of Judge Wakefield, but they were unable to take it. Later that day free-state men attacked and destroy the fortress home of Titus in the Battle of Fort Titus. About 400 free-staters under the command of Samuel Walker attacked Fort Titus. Titus had a force of at least twenty-one men, including thirteen German stonemasons from nearby Lecompton, Kansas, with him. The attack was launched before a brass cannon had arrived on the site. This attempt was unsuccessful and the leader of this first attack was killed. Apparently some of the men from this attack placed themselves between Lecompton and the Army troops, so no messages could be sent between Wilson Shannon, the governor, and the troops.

Once the cannon arrived the battle ended quickly, since the fort's walls were no match for the cannon balls, which passed entirely through the fort. This cannon, named Old Sacramento, had changed hands between the northern and southern partisans three times prior to this battle. The cannon balls were made from type from a Lawrence newspaper. The battle probably lasted no more than thirty minutes. The Camp Sacket commander, Maj. John Sedgwick, moved toward Fort Titus to stop the battle, but it was over before troops arrived.

== Destruction ==
As soon as the battle was finished, the prisoners were taken to Lawrence and Fort Titus was burned, never to be rebuilt.
