= Cody Kukuk =

American baseball player (born 1993)

- Starting pitcher
- Born: April 10, 1993 (age 32); McLouth, Kansas, U.S.
- Bats: Left Throws: Left

Cody Scott Kukuk (born April 10, 1993) is an American former professional baseball pitcher who played from 2012 to 2014 in the Boston Red Sox organization. In 2015, he was sentenced to prison for an armed robbery.

== Pitching career ==
Kukuk attended Lawrence Free State High School in Lawrence, Kansas, playing for the school's baseball team as a pitcher and outfielder. In his junior year, Kukuk earned Sunflower League Player of the Year and the Gatorade Kansas Baseball Player of the Year honors. He committed to attend the University of Kansas on a college baseball scholarship to play for the Kansas Jayhawks baseball team. The Boston Red Sox selected Kukuk in the seventh round (232nd overall) of the 2011 Major League Baseball draft, and he received a $800,000 signing bonus to join the Red Sox organization rather than attend college.

In May 2012, Kukuk was arrested for driving under the influence. The charge was dismissed in August when a judge determined that the officer did not have sufficient probable cause to pull over Kukuk. He missed most of the 2012 season as a result of the charge, pitching in only five games for the Gulf Coast League Red Sox of the Rookie-level Gulf Coast League.

Kukuk joined the Greenville Drive of the Single-A South Atlantic League in 2013, returning to Greenville in 2014. After opening the season with a 3–0 record and a 1.88 ERA in five starts, the Red Sox promoted him to the Salem Red Sox of the High-A Carolina League. Kukuk struggled at Salem, going 4–7 with a 5.26 ERA and 87 strikeouts, while walking 71 batters in 78 2/3 innings pitched.

== Criminal history ==
In November 2014, Kukuk was arrested in Long Beach, California, due to a warrant issued for an aggravated robbery committed in Lawrence earlier in the month. He was extradited to Lawrence to await trial. Afterwards, the Red Sox put Kukuk on the restricted list (making him ineligible to play, but still part of the organization).

On May 7, 2015, Kukuk pleaded no contest to aggravated robbery, robbery, and aggravated burglary. Facing up to 519 months (over 43 years) in prison if given the maximum sentence, on June 9 he was sentenced to three and a half years for his actions. In addition to his 42-month prison sentence, Kukuk was ordered to serve 36 months of post release supervision after he is released from prison. He was also ordered to register as a violent offender for 15 years after his sentence is complete. Additionally, Judge Paula Martin ordered Kukuk to pay restitution to the victims and pay the cost of his extradition from California to Kansas. The Red Sox released Kukuk following his sentencing.
