= Thomasville Times-Enterprise =

- Type: Semi-weekly newspaper
- Format: Broadsheet
- Owner: Carpenter Media Group
- Publisher: Laurie Gay
- Editor: Jill Holloway
- Founded: 1889
- Headquarters: 218 W Jackson Street, Thomasville, Georgia 31792 United States
- Circulation: 8,009 (as of 2013)
- Website: timesenterprise.com

The Thomasville Times-Enterprise is a semi-weekly newspaper published in Thomasville, Georgia. It is owned by Carpenter Media Group. CMG acquired the paper in 2024 from CNHI.

A popular columnist for the paper was retired Georgia State Representative Theo Titus, who wrote over 1000 columns on nature, and other subjects, over a twenty-year span from 1986 to 2006. A book was published from an edited collection of his columns, under the title An Outdoor Heritage-stories from a South Georgia Life.
