= WSTT =

- Thomasville, Georgia; United States
- Broadcast area: Tallahassee metropolitan area
- Frequency: 730 kHz

Programming
- Format: Gospel

Ownership
- Owner: Southern Gulf Broadcasting, Inc.; (Marion R. Williams)

History
- First air date: December 1947
- Former call signs: WKTG (1947–1964); WLOR (1964–1990); WSTT (1990–1991); WSNI (1991)

Technical information
- Licensing authority: FCC
- Facility ID: 39735
- Class: D
- Power: 5,000 watts day; 27 watts night
- Transmitter coordinates: 30°42′47″N 84°8′20″W

Links
- Public license information: Public file; LMS
- Website: www.wstt730.com

WSTT (730 AM) is a radio station broadcasting a gospel music format. Licensed to Thomasville, Georgia, United States, the station is currently owned by Southern Gulf Broadcasting.

== History ==
This station first went on the air in December 1947 as WKTG, owned by Eunice M. Martin ("Thomas County Broadcasting") and broadcasting from the Bank of Thomas County Building in Thomasville. After transfers to John H. Phipps in 1955 and James S. Rivers in 1959, original owner Martin re-purchased WKTG in 1960. In December 1963, Martin sold out again, this time to Triple C Broadcasting (owned by Mrs. Lem Clarke, Dink Collins and Jay Clarke). In 1972, the station was bought by Norris Mills and Chester Bellamy, who changed the call letters to WLOR ("Wonderful Land of Roses"), broadcasting a block format of easy listening, gospel, country and pop music. By 1978, the station was owned by Marion R. Williams, had changed formats to country and gospel, and was known as WSTT.

=== MTV contest ===
In 1990, MTV obtained a "revocable option" to purchase WSTT, with the idea to offer it as a prize in a contest. Ervin Duggan, a member of the Federal Communications Commission (FCC), called the idea "repugnant" at the time, but did not say whether the FCC would approve such a transfer. In November of that year, Chris McCarron, general manager and DJ at Cerritos College station KCEB (now WPMD), was selected at random from about 250,000 people who took part in the giveaway. McCarron won $10,000 in cash along with the station; she was also given the option to either keep WSTT or trade it for an undisclosed cash sum. She visited the station on Saturday, November 10, 1990, when rocker Billy Idol was an on-air guest.

The station changed its call letters to WSNI on February 15, 1991, but this lasted barely two months, as it switched back to WSTT on April 22. It is speculated that McCarron took the cash option and/or sold the station back to MTV, and then moved on with her life. The station's license was again assigned to Marion R. Williams (still WSTT's current owner as of 2021) at that time.
