= Fort Saunders =

Fort Saunders, Kansas
- 4 miles (6.4 km) southeast of Clinton, Kansas

Site information
- Type: partisan settler fort
- Controlled by: southern partisans

Location
- Coordinates: 38.8881°N 95.4276°W

Site history
- Built: c. May 1856
- In use: ca. May 1856 - August 15, 1856
- Materials: wood, earthwork

Garrison information
- Past commanders: Col. B. F. Treadwell
- Garrison: varied

Fort Saunders, 4 miles (6.4 km) southeast of Clinton, Kansas, and 12 miles (19 km) southwest of Lawrence, Kansas, was owned by James D. Saunders, a militia captain. What little was left of Clinton disappeared during construction of the Clinton Lake in the 1960s; only an outbuilding that was converted into a museum remains.

== History ==
=== Construction ===
Fort Saunders, a solid log house of two stories, was probably constructed in or before May 1856, becoming a stronghold for southerners who settled the area. It contained port holes to allow its occupants to shoot at anyone attacking it. The house had considerable breastworks surrounding it. Situated along Washington Creek, this partisan fort was in a very hilly area. It was probably on top of a high ridge. James Saunders, according to Acting Gov. Daniel Woodson, kept a number of U.S. muskets for the defense of Douglas County inside his fortress home.

In August 1856 the northern partisans began to move against the southern forts in the area. On August 5 free-state partisans took another southern stronghold at New Georgia. Many of the southern defenders who fled New Georgia's fort made their way to Fort Saunders. On August 12 Franklin's Fort, another area southern fort was taken in a pitched battle. On this same day Maj. David S. Hoyt, a partisan of the northern cause, made his way to the fort to learn all he could about the conditions there.

Hoyt had a discussion with Col. B. F. Treadwell, the fort's commander. It seems that men from the fort were committing depredations against the free-state settlers and some settlers were harassed. One source said appeals had been made to the U.S. Army to intervene to put an end to the depredations. Army leaders would not act unless requested by the territorial government, which refused to make such a request. Hoyt tried, but failed, to make an arrangement with Treadwell to have these problems ended. Hoyt and Treadwell were both Freemasons. Hoyt trusted Treadwell to ensure the safety of a fellow Mason. Hoyt was not harmed while at the fort, but on his return trip he was brutally murdered and his body was mutilated before it was buried in a shallow grave.

=== Battle of Fort Saunders ===
When Hoyt failed to return home and his body was found near Fort Saunders, his free-state comrades wanted revenge for Hoyt's murder. On August 15 a group of possibly 400 to 500 men, including the Stubbs, led by James H. Lane, moved toward Fort Saunders. Pickets from Fort Saunders saw the approaching men and the entire command under Treadwell fled without firing a shot. The only man who remained in the fort was a slave around 18 years old. Woodson claimed the muskets allotted for the defense of Douglas County at the fort were stolen by the northerners. The southerners left provisions, arms and ammunition. They even left a hot meal on the table. The free-state force took the supplies. It was said a number of items were found that had been stolen from various locations in the county. Before the northerners left they burned the building, which was never rebuilt.

The next day Fort Titus, south of Lecompton (the territorial capital of Kansas Territory), was attacked and taken by the northerners. Fort Titus was another southern stronghold. A number of the prisoners taken from Fort Titus were Georgians who had been at Fort Saunders.
