= Camp Sacket =

- southwest of Lecompton, Kansas

Site information
- Type: U.S. Army camp
- Controlled by: Fort Leavenworth

Location
- Camp Sacket Camp Sacket (the United States)
- Coordinates: 39.0154°N 95.4307°W

Site history
- Built: ca. May 1856
- In use: ca. May 1856 - March 1857
- Materials: was mainly tents, some wooden structures built

Garrison information
- Past commanders: Maj. John Sedgwick, Lieut. Col. Philip St. George Cooke, Lieut. Col. George Andrews, Capt. E. W. B. Newby
- Garrison: troops from Fort Leavenworth

Camp Sacket, sometimes spelled Camp Sackett, was a field post southeast of Lecompton, Kansas, that moved a number of times for various reasons. It was established probably in May 1856 or possibly a bit earlier. It was named for Capt. Delos B. Sackett (or Sacket), who was stationed there during part of the post's existence. Sacket served in the American Civil War and was with the U.S. Army until 1881, when he retired as a brigadier general.

During much of its existence, Camp Sacket was near a high hill that was used as a lookout post. At least five officers stationed at the camp became well known in the upcoming Civil War. They were Maj. John Sedgwick, Lieut. J.E.B. Stuart, Lieut. Col. Joseph E. Johnston, Col. Edwin V. Sumner and Lieut. Col. Philip St. George Cooke.

Camp Sacket was established to provide some aid to the government of Kansas Territory, in Lecompton. This government was the legal government, but was sympathetic to the southern cause in Kansas. Charles L. Robinson was the governor of the government loyal to the northern (free-state) cause. Robinson's government was not recognized by the Federal government. The troops at Camp Sacket were supplied by Fort Leavenworth and did their best to maintain a neutral stance between the two sides. Both sides accused the Army of favoring the opposing side.

From May to September 1856, Charles Robinson and six other prisoners from the free-state cause were held prisoner at Camp Sacket. While the prisoners were there, the troops at Camp Sacket did their duty to prevent battles and strife between the northern and southern sides from becoming an all-out war. In August Lieut. Col. Cooke arrived at the camp with 500 men to take charge and supplement the 100 men who had been stationed there prior to then.

Camp Sacket's troops were continually being deployed to various locations to prevent trouble. Troops were sent to Lawrence, Topeka, Lecompton and various more rural locations while the camp existed. At the end of March 1857 all the troops at the camp were ordered back to Fort Leavenworth. An appeal from Acting Governor Daniel Woodson failed to persuade the Army to reoccupy Camp Sacket.
