= Henry T. Titus =

American judge

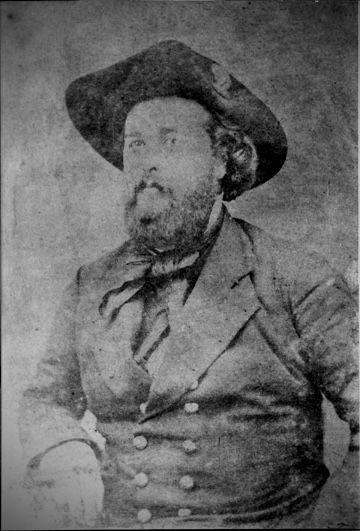

Personal details
- Born: Henry Theodore Titus; February 13, 1823 Trenton, New Jersey, US
- Died: August 7, 1881 (aged 58) Titusville, Florida, US
- Spouse: Mary Evalina Hopkins
- Children: 9
- Occupation: citrus grower; grocer; sawmill operator; postal inspector; soldier of fortune

Military service
- Allegiance: Lopez filibusters; Border Ruffians; Walker's filibuster; Confederate States
- Rank: Colonel - Honorary title
- Battles/wars: Lopez Expedition; Bleeding Kansas; Battle of Fort Titus; Filibuster War; Second Battle of Rivas; American Civil War

Henry Theodore Titus (February 13, 1823 – August 7, 1881) was a pioneer, soldier of fortune, and the founder of Titusville, Florida. His military adventurism included expeditions to Cuba and Nicaragua, fighting on the side of pro-slavery forces in the Kansas Territory, and blockade running during the Civil War. Never commissioned, Titus retained the honorary title of Colonel.

== Early years ==
Titus was born in Trenton, New Jersey, on February 13, 1823. He was the first of nine children of Theodore Titus, and Catharine Flick Howell. He was raised in Wilkes Barre, Pennsylvania. He was enrolled for some time at the United States Military Academy at West Point, but did not graduate. In 1845, he was a postal inspector in Philadelphia.

== Pioneer and military adventurer ==
Titus was a leader of the Narciso López expedition, an unauthorized military venture that invaded Cuba in 1850-1851.

On 20 August 1852 Titus and his son Ellett survived the sinking of the steamer Atlantic after it collided with the steamer Ogdensburg.

Titus was a grocer and sawmill operator in Jacksonville, until migrating with his family to "Bleeding Kansas" in April 1856 to join pro-slavery forces. He resided at Fort Titus, a fortified double-log cabin one mile south of Lecompton, that came under artillery attack from John Brown's raiders on Aug. 16, 1856, in what became known as the Battle of Fort Titus. He was wounded, captured, and exchanged for Free-State prisoners, before joining William Walker in Nicaragua in February 1857. Walker was engaged in an unauthorized military expedition, known as the Filibuster War, in the country, ultimately to establish a slaveholding settlement there. After his force was defeated at Castillo Viejo a few weeks later, Titus went to New York City.

Titus and his brother Elliot moved to the Sonoita Valley, Arizona, where they operated various ore mines during 1858-1860.

Titus returned to Jacksonville during the American Civil War and served as assistant quartermaster in the Florida Militia. He was also working for the Florida Provision Company, a business owned by his father-in-law, Edward S. Hopkins. The firm sold supplies to the Confederate Army. While transporting a load of Confederate draft dodgers to Nassau in 1863, Titus lost his steamer to the Northern blockade and was captured on the Indian River. He eluded imprisonment and later returned to Florida with his family, preceding a post-war wave of newcomers.

== Titusville ==
He moved to New York with his family in 1865, but returned to Florida in November 1867, settling at Sand Point which at that time had a population of 250. Titus built a sawmill, general store and hotel at that location. Titus was appointed postmaster, and soon thereafter renamed the settlement "Titusville." The name of Titusville was determined by a dominoes game with Captain Clark Rice on October 16, 1873. He lobbied tirelessly to have Titusville named as county seat. His efforts were realized on October 7, 1879, when a vote was taken and the result supported relocation of the county seat to Titusville.

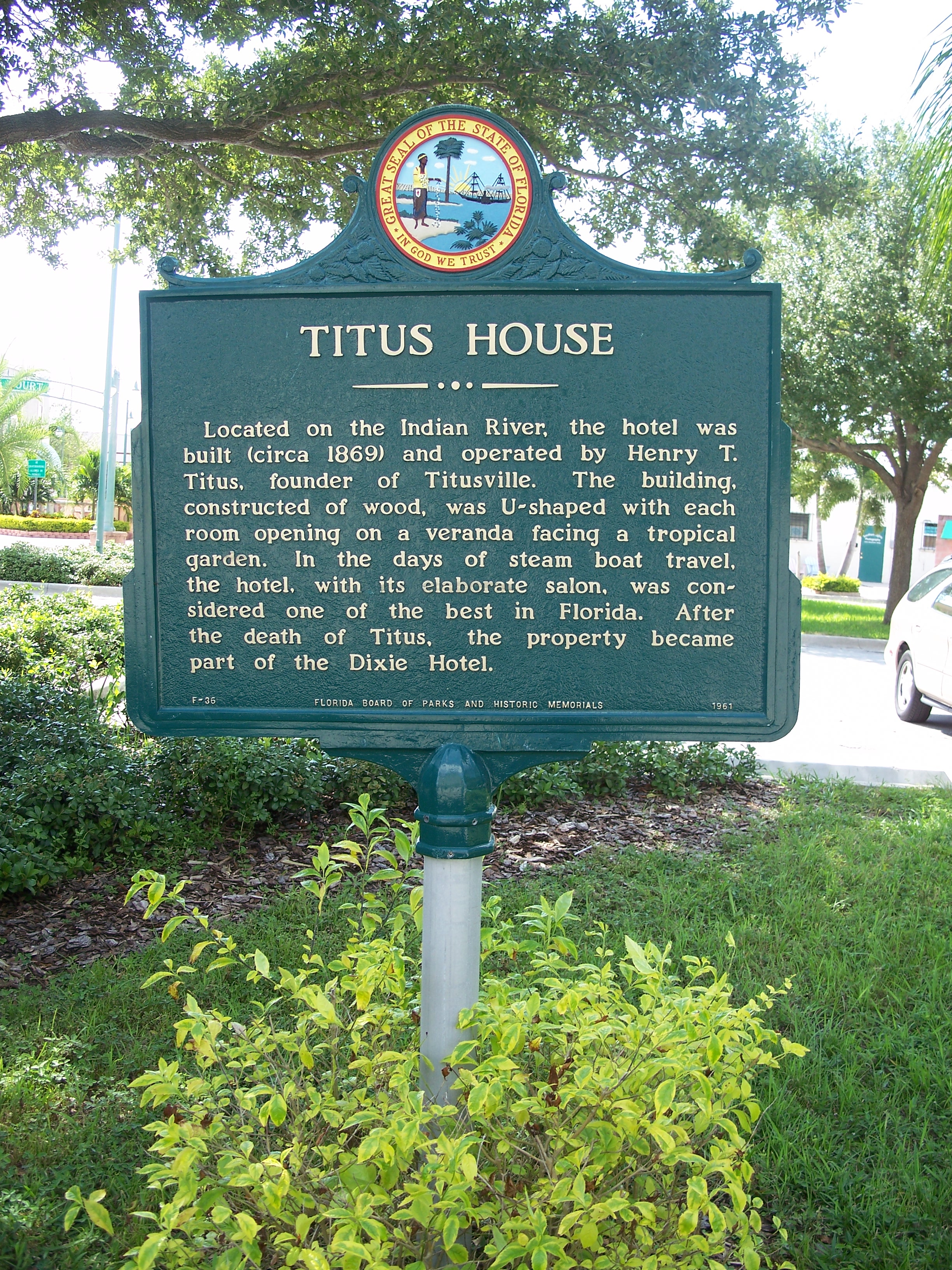
Historical marker about the Titus House in Titusville, Florida

== Later years and legacy ==
He was also the Justice of the Peace, a notary public for Volusia County, and a marine insurance underwriter's agent. During the last years of his life, he used a wheelchair due to rheumatic gout. Henry Theodore Titus died August 7, 1881, in his namesake town of Titusville.

His son Theodore Titus (Sr.) became a distinguished south Georgia jurist. Great-grandson Theodore Titus, III served five terms as a member of the Georgia House of Representatives.

== See also ==
- Fort Titus
- Battle of Fort Titus
- Judge Wakefield's house
- Second Battle of Rivas
