= New Georgia's fort =

Coordinates: 38.5050°N 94.8538°W

New Georgia's Fort
- east of Osawatomie, Kansas

Site information
- Type: partisan settler fort
- Controlled by: Southern partisans

Site history
- Built: 1856
- In use: summer 1856
- Materials: wood, earthwork

Garrison information
- Garrison: Southern partisans

New Georgia's Fort was located in Miami County, Kansas, southeast of Osawatomie. During the partisan warfare in Kansas Territory in 1856 commonly known as Bleeding Kansas, a colony of Southerners, possibly all Georgians, established New Georgia. This colony was located on the Marias des Cygnes River. A blockhouse fort was constructed there and entrenchments were begun but the fort destroyed before the entrenchments could be completed. Northern settlers in the area claimed settlers at New Georgia harassed them. In reality, some settlers from both the North and South had groups who caused trouble with their neighbors.

August Bondi and Dr. Rufus Gilpatrick spied on New Georgia during two trips taken in July and August 1856. During August the Free-State Northerners decided to take action against four Southern strongholds in the area to help put an end to the pro-slavery cause in Kansas. Southern partisans wanted Kansas admitted to the Union as a slave state. From period sources, it is not completely clear how a Free-State group of men took possession of New Georgia's fort. It is known of the four forts taken, New Georgia was the first to fall.

There is only partial agreement as to how the Northern partisans took possession of the New Georgia fort, but the information obtained by Bondi and Gilpatrick helped in the planning to take the place. The group of men intending to run the Southerners out of New Georgia left Lawrence, Kansas, on August 5. Lawrence was a Free-State stronghold. It is not known how many men defended the fort, but the Free-Staters may have fired a few shots before reaching it. Even the number of defenders was disputed by several sources, but probably about 100 men were there.

Several sources said when its defenders fled, they left behind many supplies, mostly food. After the Free-Staters loaded all they could into wagons, they burned the fort and the supplies they could not carry away. The retreating Georgians moved from New Georgia to Fort Saunders, another Southern stronghold, located southwest of Lawrence.

The fort at New Georgia was not rebuilt.
