= Franklin's Fort =

Fortification

Franklin's fort
- Franklin (Douglas County), Kansas

Site information
- Type: prosouthern post during Bleeding Kansas era
- Controlled by: Pro-slavery partisans

Location
- Coordinates: 38.9338°N 95.1761°W

Site history
- Built: May 1856
- In use: May to August 1856

Garrison information
- Past commanders: Sheriff Samuel J. Jones
- Garrison: Pro-slavery partisans

Franklin's Fort was a small fortification that had been erected in Franklin, Douglas County, Kansas by pro-slavery settlers. During the "Bleeding Kansas" period, the fort was the site of two minor battles between pro- and anti-slavery factions.

== History ==
=== Background ===
Franklin was a small town established in 1854 in Douglas County, Kansas Territory. It was established by settlers, mostly from the nation's south, who wanted the territory admitted to the Union as a slave state. By late 1855 Franklin had about a dozen homes and businesses and a post office. It became a center devoted to the southern cause in Kansas. By May 1856 a blockhouse was built inside Franklin, which was used to store arms and the "Old Sacramento Cannon", which had been seized during a raid on the Liberty, Missouri arsenal. The blockhouse was built to be defended in the event of attack by forces from Lawrence.

=== First Battle of Franklin ===
Two attacks were made on Franklin's fort during summer 1856. The first attack was made on June 4 by about fifteen members of the Stubbs, a free-state militia based in Lawrence. The free-staters entered town after dark to search for "Old Sacramento Cannon," which had been taken during a southern raid on Lawrence. Some sleeping defenders at the fort were aroused by noise and what was termed the First Battle of Franklin erupted. The cannon was fired once without injuring any free-staters. Town residents shot from their houses at the free-staters, town, forcing their retreat. One Franklin man was killed and a few persons were wounded. Some Franklin men may have been captured by the Lawrence men.

=== Second Battle of Franklin ===
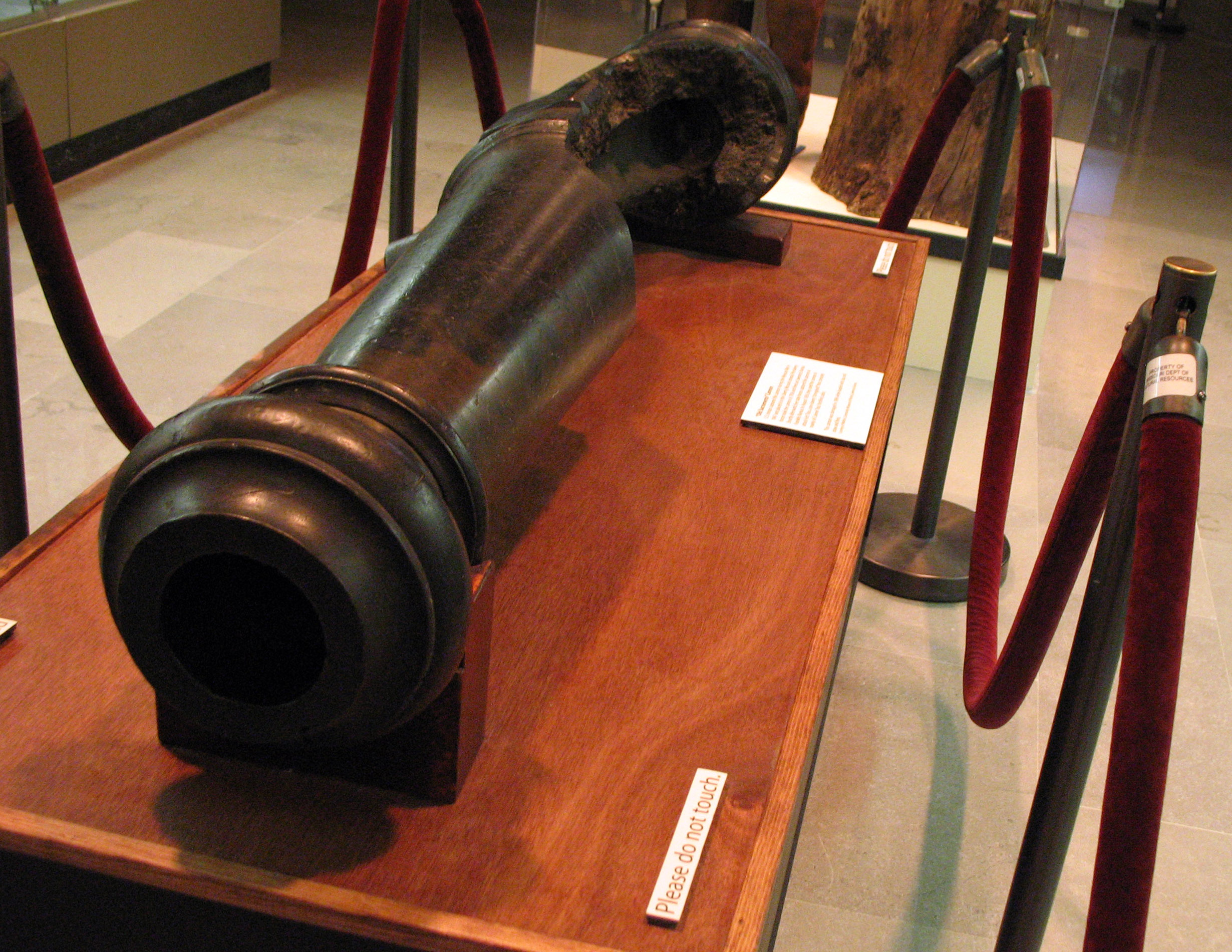
The "Old Sacramento Cannon" was captured by free state partisans during the Second Battle of Franklin on August 12, 1856.

After this battle, Franklin's fort was made more defensible. On August 12 the Second Battle of Franklin took place. Possibly two companies, at least 75 men, left Lawrence after dark to capture or destroy the fort. Free-state leader James H. Lane led the march on Franklin. Apparently only about 20 men were defending Franklin and the fort. For several hours the battle was waged with opposing forces shooting at each other in the dark. Not much damage was inflicted to either side at this point, but one free-stater was killed and several were wounded, as was one of Franklin's fort defenders.

A man from Franklin was sent to travel to a company of U.S. cavalry camped approximately 5 miles (8.0 km) away and seek help. The cavalry reached Franklin just before dawn. By then the battle was over. Although the town's defenders fought determinedly, the Lawrence men finally made progress when they set a wagon loaded with hay afire and moved it to the front door of the fort. The heat and light caused the defenders of the fort to escape into the night, as they thought they may be burned alive.

While the adjoining post office was damaged by fire during the Second Battle of Franklin, the fort was damaged only by bullets. The free-staters entered it and took fifty to eighty muskets and ammunition. They also found the "Old Sacramento Cannon" disguised as a dress-making mannequin. They took the food stored there and 14 prisoners, while suffering one man killed and several wounded. The fort was left, but this ended its use as a town defense. It was converted to use as a residence and was occupied by Dr. R. L. Williams until probably the 1870s.
