= Eudora Township, Kansas =

Eudora Township
- Township
- Location in Douglas County
- Coordinates: 38°53′30″N 095°06′41″W
- Country: United States
- State: Kansas
- County: Douglas

Area
  - Total: 50.27 sq mi (130.21 km^{2})
  - Land: 49.48 sq mi (128.16 km^{2})
  - Water: 0.79 sq mi (2.05 km^{2}) 1.57%
- Elevation: 869 ft (265 m)

Population (2020)
  - Total: 7,734
  - Density: 156.3/sq mi (60.35/km^{2})
- GNIS feature ID: 0479530

Eudora Township is a township in Douglas County, Kansas, United States. As of the 2020 census, its population was 7,734.

== Geography ==
Eudora Township covers an area of 50.28 square miles (130.2 km^{2}) and contains one incorporated settlement, Eudora. According to the USGS, it contains two cemeteries: Day and Eudora. A third cemetery, located on the edge of the City of Eudora city limits, but actually in Eudora Township, not Eudora proper, is the Jewish Cemetery, Beni Israel Cemetery.

The streams of Captain Creek, Coleman Creek, Little Wakarusa Creek, Spring Creek and Wakarusa River run through this township.

== Adjacent townships ==
- Reno Township, Leavenworth County (north)
- Sherman Township, Leavenworth County (northeast)
- Lexington Township, Johnson County (east)
- Palmyra Township, Douglas County (south)
- Wakarusa Township, Douglas County (west)

== Communities ==
Although these towns may not be incorporated or populated, they are still placed on maps produced by the county.

- Eudora, located at 38°56′18″N 95°5′51″W
- Hesper, located at 38°53′55″N 95°04′29″W

== Transportation ==
=== Major highway ===
- K-10

=== Airports ===
Eudora Township contains one airport or landing strip, Gage Farm Airport.

== Places of interest ==
- Along County Road 1057, near K-10 on the Wakarusa River was the site of Blue Jacket's Crossing, a crossing point for the Oregon Trail. A park at 12th & Cedar in Eudora memorializes Blue Jacket.
- Southwest of Eudora, along Winchester Road, is the Beni Israel Cemetery. A cemetery given to the Jewish community in 1858. Many of the headstones have Hebrew characters on them and the cemetery was listed on the National Register of Historic Places in 2013.
- Southwest of Eudora is the Dorothy Akin Prairie Preserve, a scenic prairie easement maintained by the Kansas Land Trust since 1994. The area provides a scenic view, various species of wildflowers and plenty of open space.
