= Aubry Township, Kansas =

Aubry Township
- Township
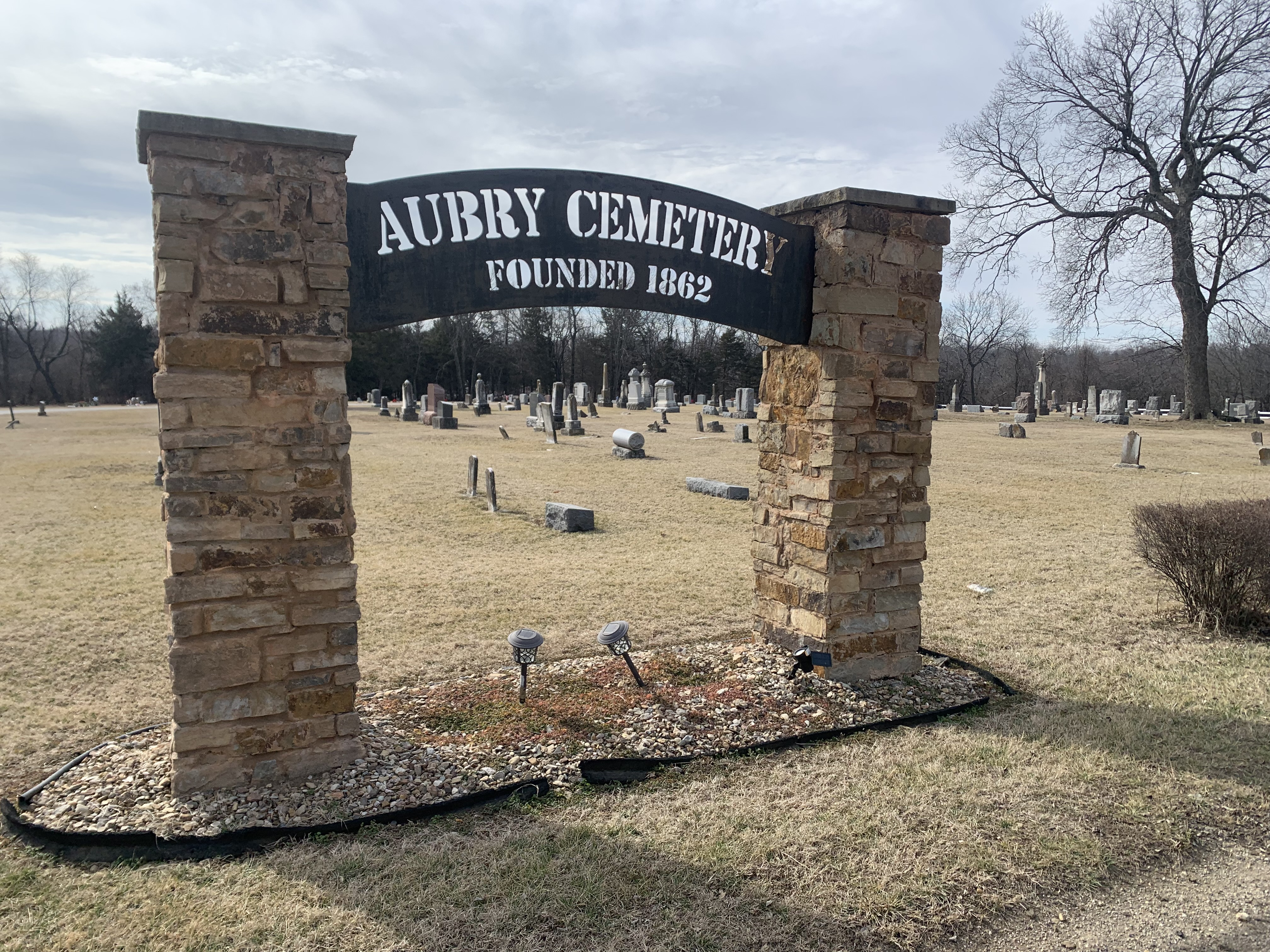
- Aubry Cemetery at Aubry (2026)

- Location in Johnson County
- Coordinates: 38°46′55″N 94°41′11″W
- Country: United States
- State: Kansas
- County: Johnson

Area
  - Total: 33.504 sq mi (86.77 km^{2})
  - Land: 33.069 sq mi (85.65 km^{2})
  - Water: 0.435 sq mi (1.13 km^{2}) 1.3%
- Elevation: 1,063 ft (324 m)

Population (2020)
  - Total: 4,650
  - Density: 141/sq mi (54.3/km^{2})
- ZIP Codes: 66013, 66062, 66083, 66085
- Area code: 913
- GNIS ID: 479425

Aubry Township is a township in Johnson County, Kansas, United States. As of the 2020 census, its population was 4,650.

== History ==
Aubry Township was organized in 1858.

== Geography ==
According to the United States Census Bureau, Aubry Township covers an area of 33.504 square miles (86.775 square kilometers); of this, 33.069 square miles (85.648 square kilometers, 98.7 percent) is land and 0.435 square miles (1.127 square kilometers, 1.3 percent) is water.

The southern edge of the city of Overland Park is within this township geographically but is a separate entity.

=== Communities ===
- Aubry at 38°46′15″N 94°40′16″W
- Stilwell at 38°46′09″N 94°39′23″W

=== Adjacent townships ===
- Oxford Township (north)
- Wea Township, Miami County (south)
- Ten Mile Township, Miami County (southwest)
- Spring Hill Township (west)
- Olathe Township (northwest)

=== Cemeteries ===
The township contains these two cemeteries: Aubry and Woodland.

=== Major highway ===
- U.S. Route 69

=== Airports and landing strips ===
- Hillside Airport
- Mission Road Landing Strip

== School districts ==
- Blue Valley USD 229
- Spring Hill USD 230

== Political districts ==
- Kansas's 3rd congressional district
- State House District 27
- State Senate District 37
