= Lexington Township, Johnson County, Kansas =

Lexington Township
- Township
- Location in Johnson County
- Coordinates: 38°55′02″N 94°58′54″W
- Country: United States
- State: Kansas
- County: Johnson

Area
  - Total: 30.35 sq mi (78.61 km^{2})
  - Land: 29.48 sq mi (76.34 km^{2})
  - Water: 0.89 sq mi (2.31 km^{2})
- Elevation: 1,012 ft (308 m)

Population (2020)
  - Estimate: 1,497
- Time zone: Central
- ZIP Codes: 66018, 66019, 66025, 66061
- GNIS ID: 479167

Lexington Township is a township in Johnson County, Kansas, United States. As of the 2020 census, its population was 1,497.

== History ==
=== Potential Urban Development ===
After the closure of the Sunflower Army Ammunition Plant in 1992, plans for potential development of the 15.5 square mile lot (the largest single tract of land in the Kansas City Metropolitan Area, and the largest single urban redevelopment site in the United States) began to make rounds around locals, plans for an Oz Entertainment amusement park consumed seven futile years, after which the land was transferred to the Sunflower Redevelopment Group in 2005. At that time, about 3,700 acres were transferred clean, but much of that land was targeted for open space, buffer and parkland. Another plan that was set to open in 2002 was the newly announced Kansas Speedway and Kansas City Wizards stadiums. Recently, a master use plan has been adopted by the cities of Olathe, De Soto, the State of Kansas and Sunflower. The master plan calls for high density housing, major commercial zoning, a "downtown" area for offices, high density commercial and civic uses, and land promised to The University of Kansas, Kansas State University and the City of De Soto, as well as land being reserved for the army reserves, parks and other public spaces. However, the cleanup is expected to be completed by 2038. Recently, The Kansas City Star reported that Kansas state lawmakers urged the acceleration of cleanup efforts of the lot and announced that the northeastern portion of the plant, closest to De Soto, would be ready for light commercial and industrial development by 2020. It is speculated that the entire 15.5 square mile tract will be split for the three surrounding municipalities, those being Olathe, Gardner and De Soto. When completed, it is also speculated that the area will house over 25 thousand individuals as well as being a major tourism and historical center for Johnson County.

== Communities ==
Unlike the neighboring Eudora Township, cities are not consolidated with the township. Cities are, instead, independent from the township and vice versa.

- De Soto
- Olathe
- Cedar (former city, annexed by De Soto in 1998)
- Clearview City (former city, annexed by De Soto in 1998)
- Prairie Center (razed in 1941)
- De Soto Junction (former settlement, annexed by De Soto in 1998)

(This list is based on USGS data and may include former settlements.)

== Adjacent Townships ==
- Sherman Township in Leavenworth (north)
- Delaware Township in Wyandotte County (northeast)
- Monticello Township in Johnson County (east)
- Olathe Township in Johnson County (southeast)
- Gardner Township in Johnson County (south)
- McCamish Township in Johnson County (southwest)
- Eudora Township in Douglas County (west)

== Cemeteries ==
The township contains one cemetery: Prairie Center

== Transportation ==
=== Major highways ===
- K-10

=== Former Highways ===
- K-285

=== Airports and landing strips ===
- Cedar Creek Aircenter

== Emergency Services ==
- Johnson County Sheriff
- De Soto Fire Department

== Rivers, Lakes, Streams ==
- Kansas River
- Kill Creek
- Camp Creek
- Cedar Creek
- Captain Creek
- Kill Creek Park North Lake
- Kill Creek Park South Lake
- Kill Creek Park Lake

== Parks ==
- Kill Creek Park

=== De Soto ===
- Sunflower Nature Park
- De Soto Wilderness Park
- Kill Creek Streamway Park/Trail
- Mill Creek Rifle Club
- Lexington Lake Park

=== Olathe ===
- Timberridge Golf & Park

== School districts ==
- Gardner–Edgerton USD 231
- De Soto USD 232
- Eudora USD 491
