= Ochiltree (disambiguation) =

Ochiltree is a village in East Ayrshire, Scotland

Ochiltree may also refer to:

- Ochiltree (surname)
- Ochiltree County, Texas, a county in Texas, United States
- Lord Ochiltree, a title in the Peerage of Scotland

== See also ==
- Ochiltree Castle (disambiguation)
- Ocheltree, Kansas
