= McCamish Township, Kansas =

McCamish Township
- Township
- Location in Johnson County
- Coordinates: 38°48′21″N 95°00′43″W
- Country: United States
- State: Kansas
- County: Johnson

Area
  - Total: 43.10 sq mi (111.6 km^{2})
  - Land: 42.98 sq mi (111.3 km^{2})
  - Water: 0.12 sq mi (0.31 km^{2})
- Elevation: 909 ft (277 m)

Population (2020)
  - Estimate: 980
- Time zone: Central
- ZIP Codes: 66019, 66021, 66030
- GNIS ID: 479544
- Website: jocogov.org

McCamish Township is a township in Johnson County, Kansas, United States. As of the 2020 census, its population was 980.

== History ==
Richard D. McCamish was an early settler who founded the now extinct town of McCamish in 1857.

== Adjacent townships ==
- Lexington Township (north)
- Gardner Township (northeast)

== Cemeteries ==
Edgerton Cemetery is located in McCamish Township.

== Emergency Services ==
=== Police ===
- Johnson County Sheriff

=== Fire ===
- Johnson County Rural Fire Department

=== Medical (EMS) ===
- Lexington Township EMS, Post 35

== Transportation ==
=== Major highways ===
- I-35
- US-56
- US-50
- K-33

== Lakes, Streams & Ponds ==
- Santa Fe Lake
- Martin Creek

== Parks ==
- Martin Creek Park

== Notable Locations ==
- Johnson County Parks & Recreation
- 199th Street and Interstate 35: Kansas' First Diverging diamond interchange (2013)
- Southern Edge of Sunflower Army Ammunition Plant
- BNSF Intermodal Facility: Largest in the BNSF Railway System
- Edgerton, Kansas: Inside of Township
- Gardner, Kansas: Northwestern Edge lies inside Township

== School districts ==
- Gardner–Edgerton USD 231
