= Aubry's Post =

On March 7, 1862, Confederate guerrillas under William C. Quantrill raided the small Kansas community of Aubry, southwest of Kansas City, Missouri, and just west of the Kansas-Missouri border. Three residents were killed in the raid and much property was carted away by the guerrillas.

Quantrill's raid resulted in Aubry being garrisoned by Company E of the 8th Regiment of Kansas Volunteers. Capt. John Greelish was the first garrison commander. Aubry was garrisoned by Union troops intermittently for the rest of the Civil War. Greelish's troops arrived about March 10 and two days later won a skirmish near Aubry with about thirty of Quantrill's men. After this an additional company of troops was sent to Aubry. Maj. E. F. Schneider then took command.

Later in 1862 Company D of the 11th Kansas Infantry, under command of Lt. Dick Rooks, manned the post at Aubry. Rooks was a Red leg and a Jayhawker. This company remained at Aubry through the winter of 1862–3.

Later in 1863 troops were again sent to Aubry. The post, under the command of Capt. Joshua A. Pike, had seventy-two men, composed of two companies of cavalry. Pike was very soon to discredit himself. On the evening of August 20 Quantrill passed within sight of the post with about 400 guerrillas and Confederate Army recruits. These men were on their way to raid Lawrence, Kansas.

Pike formed his men into a line of battle south of his post, but he took no action to determine the identity of Quantrill's men or to pursue them once he suspected they were guerrillas. He passed the information about the travelers to all the troops in the area, but he did not notify his superiors about them in a timely manner.

Capt. Charles F. Coleman, in command of the post at Little Santa Fe, Missouri, marched with eighty men to Aubry. About midnight Coleman and Pike took their forces in a very belated attempt to pursue Quantrill. By this time Quantrill was so far ahead of them that the pursuers could not possibly catch him.

Pike was not to remain at Aubry much longer, but from August 1863 to at least September 1864 a force of one company, and sometimes two companies, of the 11th Kansas Cavalry was on duty guarding Aubry. We do not know what buildings were erected at Aubry, other than a guardhouse.

Sometime after September 19, 1864, very possibly during the height of Price's Missouri Raid, the garrison at Aubry was removed. A result was a raid by about ten guerrillas under Dan Vaughn on January 31, 1865. Word of the impending raid reached authorities in Olathe and a squad of soldiers rushed into Aubry, arriving too late to prevent the killing of a traveler, the robbery of two residents and the burning of several houses.

Once again soldiers, around twenty, were stationed at Aubry. The post was active until at least May 1865.
