= Spring Hill Township =

Spring Hill Township may refer to the following townships in the United States:

- Spring Hill Township, Johnson County, Kansas
- Spring Hill Township, Stearns County, Minnesota
