= Oxford Township, Kansas =

Oxford Township, Kansas may refer to:

- Oxford Township, Johnson County, Kansas
- Oxford Township, Sumner County, Kansas
