= Eudora Kaw River Bridge =

- Coordinates: 38.9564°N 95.0965°W
- Carries: Two lanes of 222nd Street
- Crosses: Kansas River
- Locale: Linwood, Kansas
- Maintained by: Douglas Co. and Leavenworth Co.

Characteristics
- Design: Girder

The Eudora Kaw River Bridge is an automobile and pedestrian crossing of the Kansas River located just north of Eudora, Kansas. A girder bridge, it is the first bridge over the river for almost four miles, as the Highway 2 Bridge is far off to the east.

The bridge runs concurrent with Leavenworth County's County Road 1 and Douglas County's County Road 1061 and the city of Eudora is just south of the bridge.

The two lane bridge has a span of 1,360 feet and was opened in 1965, built at a cost of $746,000. It was designed to be at least three feet higher than the levels reached in the Great Flood of 1951.

Its predecessor bridge was damaged by ice in 1935 and reopened in 1937, then damaged beyond use by ice in January 1962.
