= Gardner Township, Kansas =

Gardner Township
- Township
- Location in Johnson County
- Coordinates: 38°46′02″N 94°54′46″W
- Country: United States
- State: Kansas
- County: Johnson

Area
  - Total: 39.21 sq mi (101.6 km^{2})
  - Land: 39.03 sq mi (101.1 km^{2})
  - Water: 0.19 sq mi (0.49 km^{2}) 0%

Population (2020)
  - Total: 2,593
  - Density: 66.44/sq mi (25.65/km^{2})
- Time zone: Central
- ZIP Codes: 66019, 66030, 66031
- Area code: 913
- GNIS ID: 479557

Gardner Township is a township in Johnson County, Kansas, United States. As of the 2020, its population was 2,593.

== Communities ==
- New Century

== Adjacent townships ==
- Lexington Township (northwest)
- McCamish (west)
- Olathe (northeast)

== Cemeteries ==
The township contains the Gardner Township Cemetery.

== Transportation ==
=== Major highways ===
- I-35
- US-56
- US-50
- K-7
- US-169

=== Airports and landing strips ===
- New Century Aircenter
- Gardner Municipal Airport

== Rivers, Lakes (Ponds), Streams ==
- Kill Creek
- Lake Gardner

== Parks ==
- Westside Ballpark
- Gardner Celebration Park
- Gardner Airport Park

== School districts ==
- Gardner–Edgerton USD 231
- De Soto USD 232
- Olathe USD 233
