= Wilder, Kansas =

Unincorporated community in Kansas, U.S.

Wilder is an unincorporated community in Johnson County, Kansas, United States, and part of the Kansas City metropolitan area. It is located at 39°02′35″N 94°52′11″W.

== History ==
Wilder was named for E. Wilder, a railroad employee.

A post office was opened in Wilder in 1875, and remained in operation until it was discontinued in 1952.
