= Hesper, Kansas =

Unincorporated community in Douglas County, Kansas

- Unincorporated community
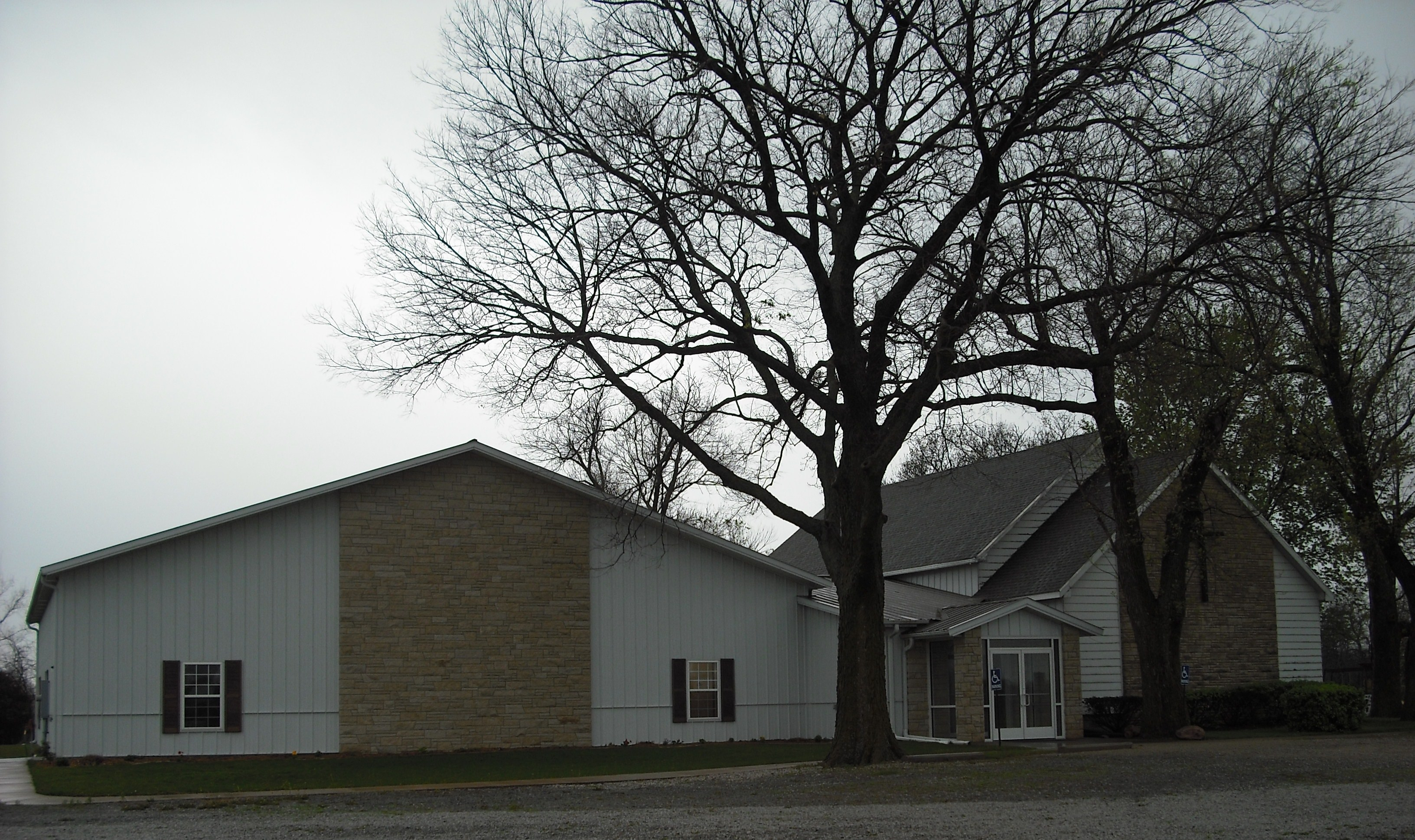
- Hesper Friends Church, organized in 1858

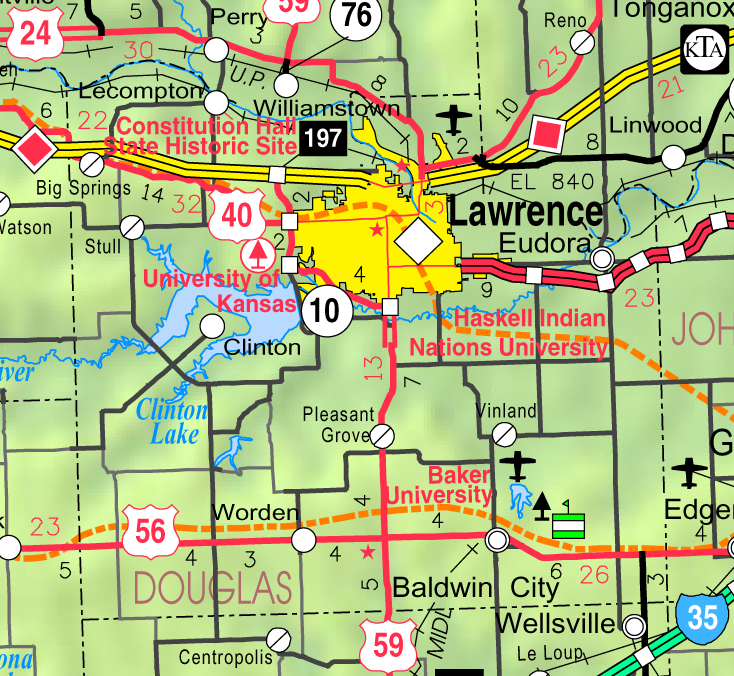
- KDOT map of Douglas County (legend)

- Location within Kansas Location within the United States
- Coordinates: 38°53′55″N 95°04′29″W
- Country: United States
- State: Kansas
- County: Douglas
- Elevation: 922 ft (281 m)
- Time zone: UTC-6 (CST)
  - Summer (DST): UTC-5 (CDT)
- Area code: 785
- FIPS code: 20-31550
- GNIS ID: 479160

Hesper is an unincorporated community in Douglas County, Kansas, United States. It is located two and a half miles southeast of Eudora.

== History ==
Hesper was founded in 1858 by Quakers wanting to lend support to the free-state cause. In 1884, the Hesper Academy was opened but it closed in 1912.

A post office was opened in Hesper in 1868, and remained in operation until it was discontinued in 1900.

== Education ==
The community is served by Eudora USD 491 public school district.

== Notable people ==
Friends University in Wichita was founded by James Davis, who was a native of Hesper. The town is also the birthplace of the college football player and coach John H. Outland, namesake of the Outland Trophy. Walter R. Stubbs, Governor of Kansas from 1909–1913, grew up in the Hesper area.
