= Johnson County Library =

Public library in Kansas

Coordinates: 38°58′11″N 94°41′58″W

- Location: Johnson County, Kansas, United States
- Type: Public library
- Established: 1952
- Branches: 14

Collection
- Size: 1,092,294

Access and use
- Circulation: 6,690,893
- Population served: 598,555

Other information
- Website: http://www.jocolibrary.org/

The Johnson County Library (JCL), established in 1952, is the county library system for Johnson County, Kansas and includes 14 branches. As of 2013, it had 1,092,294 items. It lent 6,690,893 items in 2013. It serves a population of 598,555.

== Branches ==
The Johnson County Library consists of the Central Resource branch and 13 neighborhood branches.

- Blue Valley Library - 9000 W. 151st St. Overland Park
- Cedar Roe Library - 5120 Cedar Roeland Park
- Central Resource Library - 9875 W. 87th St. Overland Park
- Corinth Library - 8100 Mission Rd. Prairie Village
- De Soto Library - 33145 W. 83rd St. De Soto
- Edgerton Library - 319 E. Nelson Edgerton
- Gardner Library - 137 E. Shawnee Gardner
- Leawood Pioneer Library - 4700 Town Center Dr. Leawood
- Lenexa City Center Library - 8778 Penrose Ln. Lenexa
- Merriam Plaza - 6120 Slater St.Merriam
- Monticello Library - 22435 W. 66th St. Shawnee
- Oak Park Library - 9500 Bluejacket Overland Park
- Shawnee Library - 13811 Johnson Dr. Shawnee
- Spring Hill Library - 109 S. Webster Spring Hill

== Marketing ==
In June 2009, with the help of the Barkley Advertising Agency the Johnson County Library system implemented a unique marketing strategy. The courier trucks the library uses to transport materials from one branch to another have been designed to represent some of the iconic individuals from literature from the angle of a product advertisement.
