= Johnson County, Kansas =

County in Kansas, United States

- County
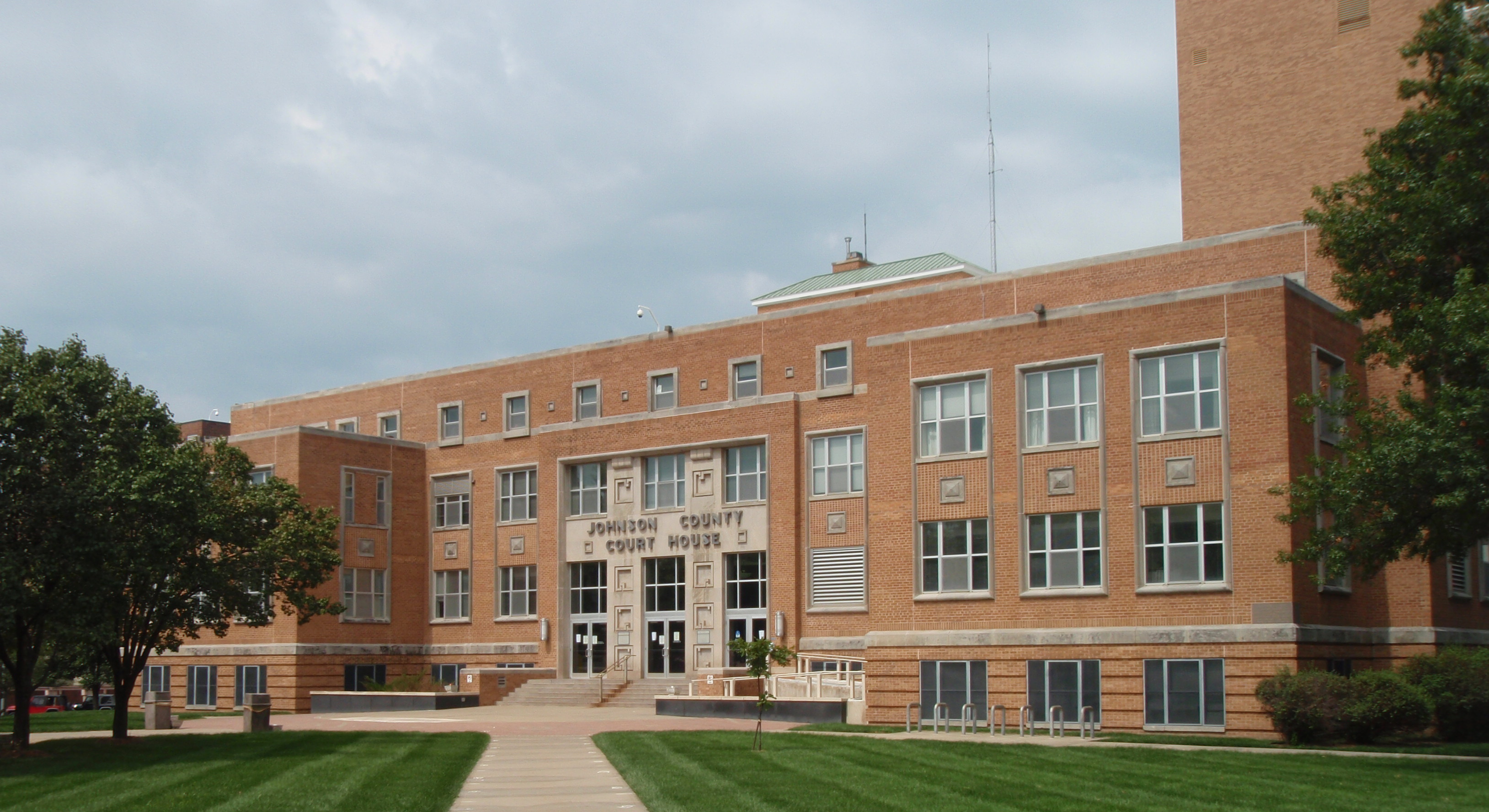
- Former Johnson County Courthouse in Olathe (2009). It was opened in 1952, closed in 2020, then demolished in 2021 after a new courthouse was finished.

- Location within the U.S. state of Kansas
- Country: United States
- State: Kansas
- Founded: August 25, 1855
- Named for: Thomas Johnson
- Seat: Olathe
- Largest city: Overland Park

Area
  - Total: 480 sq mi (1,200 km^{2})
  - Land: 473 sq mi (1,230 km^{2})
  - Water: 6.5 sq mi (17 km^{2}) 1.4%

Population (2020)
  - Total: 609,863
  - Estimate (2025): 636,906 ▲
  - Density: 1,290/sq mi (498/km^{2})
- Time zone: UTC−6 (Central)
  - Summer (DST): UTC−5 (CDT)
- Congressional district: 3rd
- Website: jocogov.org

Johnson County is a county in the U.S. state of Kansas along the state's eastern border with Missouri. Its county seat is Olathe. As of the 2020 census, its population was 609,863, making it Kansas's most populous county. The county was named after Thomas Johnson, a Methodist missionary who was one of the state's first settlers. Largely suburban, the county contains a number of suburbs of Kansas City, Kansas, including Overland Park, a principal city of and the second-most populous city in the Kansas City Metropolitan Area.

== History ==
Present-day Johnson County was part of a large territory of the Osage people, who occupied lands as far east as present-day St. Louis. After the Indian Removal, the United States government reserved much of this area as Indian territory for a reservation for the Shawnee people, who were relocated from east of the Mississippi River in the upper Midwest.

The Santa Fe Trail and Oregon–California Trail, which pass through nearby Independence, Missouri, also passed through the county. Johnson County was established in 1855 as one of the first counties in the newly organized Kansas Territory; it was named for the proslavery missionary Thomas Johnson. The renowned gunfighter Wild Bill Hickok settled in the county for a time, becoming constable of Monticello Township in 1858.

Johnson County was the site of many battles between abolitionists and pro-slavery advocates during the period of Bleeding Kansas, before residents voted on whether to allow slavery in the territory. In 1862, during the Civil War, Confederate guerrillas from nearby Missouri, led by William Quantrill, raided the Johnson County communities of Olathe and Spring Hill. They killed half a dozen men and destroyed numerous homes and businesses.

The county was largely rural until the early 20th century, when housing subdivisions were developed in its northeastern portion, adjacent to Kansas City, Missouri. Developer J. C. Nichols spurred the boom in 1914 when he built the Mission Hills Country Club to attract upscale residents who previously had been reluctant to move to Kansas. Suburban development continued at a steady pace until the close of World War II.

After the war, development exploded, triggered by the return of veterans in need of housing, construction of highways that facilitated commuting from suburbs, and the pent-up demand for new housing. The 1954 US Supreme Court decision in Brown v. Board of Education held that segregation of public schools was unconstitutional. Integration of public schools in Kansas City, Missouri, led many white families to leave the inner city, resulting in increased migration to Johnson County for new housing and what were considered higher-quality public schools, generally an indicator of higher economic status. From the mid-1980s, the pace of growth increased significantly, with the county adding 200,000 residents between the 1990 and 2010 censuses.

The 1952 Johnson County Courthouse closed in 2020 and was demolished in 2021. It was replaced by a seven-story courthouse, the county's fourth such building.

== Geography ==
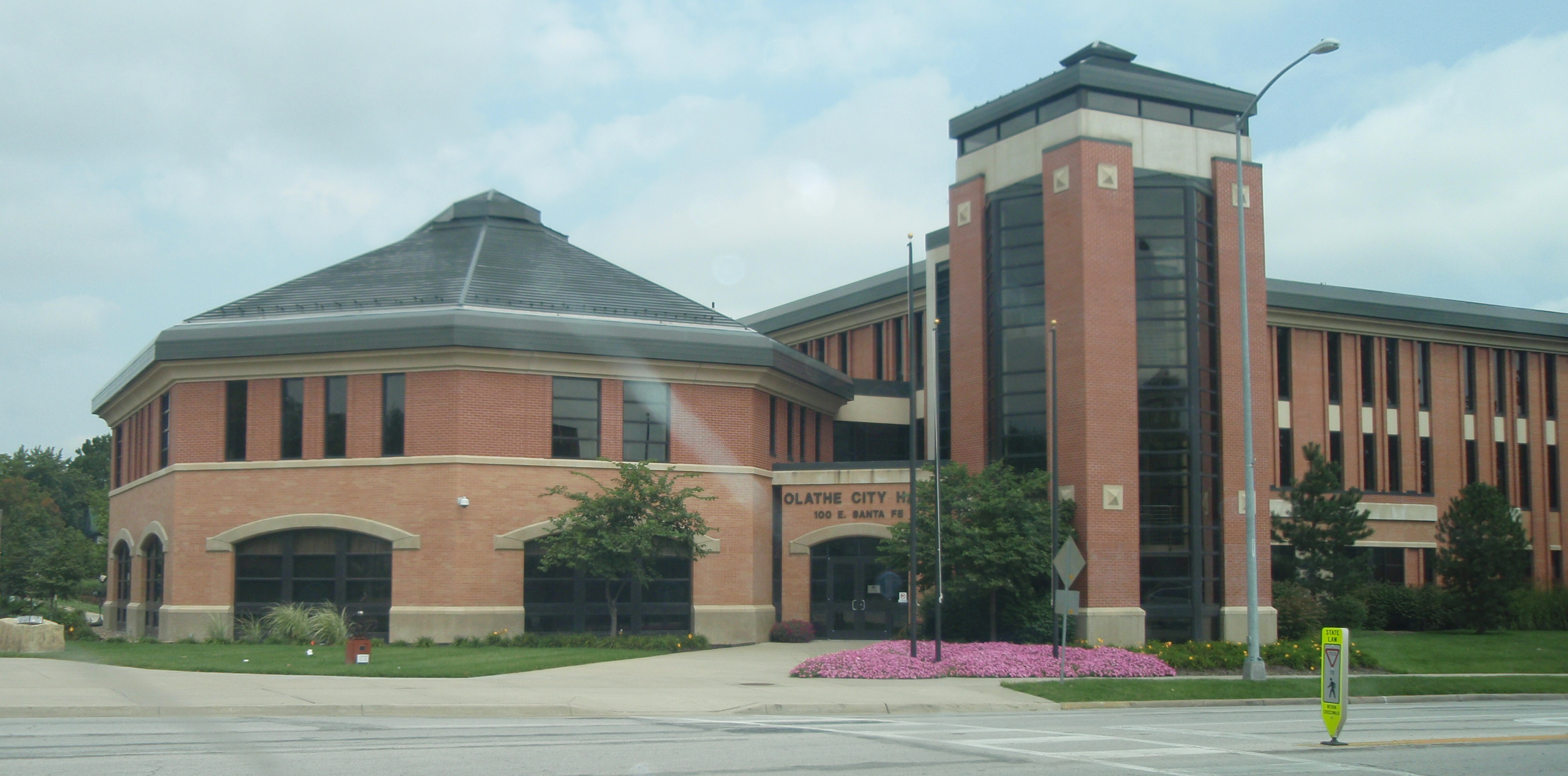
Olathe City Hall (2009)

According to the United States Census Bureau, the county has an area of 480 square miles (1,200 km^{2}), of which 473 square miles (1,230 km^{2}) is land and 6.5 square miles (17 km^{2}) (1.4%) is water.

=== Topography ===
Johnson County's natural topography consists of gently rolling terrain. The Kansas River forms part of the county's northwestern boundary. The elevation generally increases from north to south as the distance from the Kansas and Missouri rivers increases.

=== Watersheds and streams ===
The county is drained by the watersheds of the Kansas, Blue, and Marais des Cygnes, all of which are part of the Missouri River watershed. The county receives plentiful rainfall. It contains numerous small streams, including Kill Creek, Mill Creek, Turkey Creek, Indian Creek, Brush Creek, Tomahawk Creek, the Blue River, Bull Creek and Little Bull Creek.

Kill Creek begins in the southwest of the county and flows northward into the Kansas River at De Soto. Mill Creek begins in the central part of the county in Olathe, flowing northward to empty into the Kansas River at Shawnee. Turkey Creek and Brush Creek each begin in northeastern Johnson County. Turkey Creek flows northeastward into Wyandotte County and joins the Kansas River just before its confluence with the Missouri River at Kaw Point. Brush Creek flows east-northeastward through Prairie Village and Mission Hills, entering Kansas City, Missouri, within the median of Ward Parkway and passing the Country Club Plaza before emptying into the Blue River east of the Country Club Plaza and north of Swope Park. Indian Creek begins in the southern part of Olathe and Tomahawk Creek begins in southern Overland Park. Each flows northeastward meeting in Leawood, where the stream retains the name Indian Creek, just before crossing the state line and entering the Blue River in Kansas City, Missouri. The Blue River begins in rural southern Johnson County and flows north-northeastward through the southeastern part of the county, crossing the state line just east of the intersection of 151st Street and Kenneth Road in southern Overland Park. The Blue River flows through southern and eastern Kansas City before joining the Missouri River. Bull Creek and Little Bull Creek begin in rural southwestern Johnson County and flow southward, entering Hillsdale Lake before continuing into Franklin County and joining the Marais des Cygnes at Paola.

=== Flora and fauna ===
The county consists primarily of prairie grassland, with corridors of forested areas along streams and rivers.

=== Adjacent counties ===
- Wyandotte County (north)
- Jackson County, Missouri (east)
- Cass County, Missouri (southeast)
- Miami County (south)
- Franklin County (southwest)
- Douglas County (west)
- Leavenworth County (northwest)

== Demographics ==
Historical population
Census	Pop.	Note	%±
1860	4,364		—
1870	13,684		213.6%
1880	16,853		23.2%
1890	17,385		3.2%
1900	18,104		4.1%
1910	18,288		1.0%
1920	18,314		0.1%
1930	21,179		15.6%
1940	33,327		57.4%
1950	62,783		88.4%
1960	143,792		129.0%
1970	220,073		53.0%
1980	270,269		22.8%
1990	355,054		31.4%
2000	451,086		27.0%
2010	544,179		20.6%
2020	609,863		12.1%
2025 (est.)	636,906	▲	4.4%
U.S. Decennial Census; 1790-1960 1900-1990; 1990-2000 2010-2020

Johnson County (county code JO) is included in the Kansas City metropolitan area. The county has Kansas's highest median household income at $107,261 in 2019-2023 and its highest per-capita income, with the 19th-highest median household income in 2000 and the 46th highest per-capita income in 2005. 56.9 percent of residents had bachelor's degree or higher as of 2023.

=== Racial and ethnic composition ===
Johnson County, Kansas – Racial and ethnic composition Note: the US Census treats Hispanic/Latino as an ethnic category. This table excludes Latinos from the racial categories and assigns them to a separate category. Hispanics/Latinos may be of any race.
Race / Ethnicity (NH = Non-Hispanic)	Pop 1980	Pop 1990	Pop 2000	Pop 2010	Pop 2020	% 1980	% 1990	% 2000	% 2010	% 2020
White alone (NH)	259,663	334,167	401,428	446,044	460,399	96.08%	94.12%	88.99%	81.97%	75.49%
Black or African American alone (NH)	3,136	6,809	11,568	23,028	28,092	1.16%	1.92%	2.56%	4.23%	4.61%
Native American or Alaska Native alone (NH)	676	1,160	1,312	1,639	1,595	0.25%	0.33%	0.29%	0.30%	0.26%
Asian alone (NH)	2,118	5,739	12,697	22,598	32,856	0.78%	1.62%	2.81%	4.15%	5.39%
Native Hawaiian or Pacific Islander alone (NH)	x	x	149	259	346	x	x	0.03%	0.05%	0.06%
Other race alone (NH)	641	174	459	864	2,393	0.24%	0.05%	0.10%	0.16%	0.39%
Mixed race or Multiracial (NH)	x	x	5,516	10,798	29,793	x	x	1.22%	1.98%	4.89%
Hispanic or Latino (any race)	4,035	7,005	17,957	38,949	54,389	1.49%	1.97%	3.98%	7.16%	8.92%
Total	270,269	355,054	451,086	544,179	609,863	100.00%	100.00%	100.00%	100.00%	100.00%

=== 2020 census ===
As of the 2020 census, the county had a population of 609,863. The median age was 38.2 years. 24.2% of residents were under the age of 18 and 15.6% of residents were 65 years of age or older. For every 100 females there were 95.9 males, and for every 100 females age 18 and over there were 93.4 males age 18 and over. 96.0% of residents lived in urban areas, while 4.0% lived in rural areas.

The racial makeup of the county was 77.6% White, 4.7% Black or African American, 0.4% American Indian and Alaska Native, 5.4% Asian, 0.1% Native Hawaiian and Pacific Islander, 3.1% from some other race, and 8.7% from two or more races. Hispanic or Latino residents of any race comprised 8.9% of the population.

There were 239,492 households in the county, of which 32.7% had children under the age of 18 living with them and 23.9% had a female householder with no spouse or partner present. About 26.2% of all households were made up of individuals and 9.7% had someone living alone who was 65 years of age or older.

There were 251,681 housing units, of which 4.8% were vacant. Among occupied housing units, 67.4% were owner-occupied and 32.6% were renter-occupied. The homeowner vacancy rate was 1.2% and the rental vacancy rate was 7.5%.

=== 2010 census ===
As of the 2010 census, there were 544,179 people, 210,278 households, and 143,509 families residing in the county. The population density was 1,150 inhabitants per square mile (440/km^{2}). There were 226,571 housing units at an average density of 381 per square mile (147/km^{2}). The racial makeup of the county was 86.0% White, 4.2% Asian, 4.3% Black or African American, 0.4% Native American, 0.01% Pacific Islander, 1.55% from other races, and 2.5% from two or more races. Hispanic or Latino of any race were 7.2% of the population. 30.6% identified as of German, 16.8% Irish, 13.6% English and 5.7% American ancestry.

There were 210,278 households, out of which 34.6% had children under the age of 18 living with them, 56.1% were married couples living together, 8.4% had a female householder with no husband present, and 31.8% were non-families. 25.9% of all households were made up of individuals, and 7.8% had someone living alone who was 65 years of age or older. The average household size was 2.51 and the average family size was 3.05.

In the county, 26.3% of the population was under the age of 18, 7.60% was from 18 to 24, 32.80% from 25 to 44, 22.50% from 45 to 64, and 10.9% was 65 years of age or older. The median age was 36.4 years. 48.8% of the population were males and 51.2% of the population were females.

The median income for a household in the county was $73,733, and the median income for a family was $90,380. Males had a median income of $61,346 versus $43,785 for females. The per capita income for the county was $37,882. About 3.6% of families and 5.5% of the population were below the poverty line, including 7.1% of those under age 18 and 4.9% of those age 65 or over.

=== 2000 census ===
As of the census of 2000, there were 451,086 people, 174,570 households, and 121,675 families residing in the county. The population density was 365/km^{2} (950/mi^{2}). There were 181,612 housing units at an average density of 147/km^{2} (380/mi^{2}). The racial makeup of the county was 91.11% White, 2.61% Black or African American, 0.33% Native American, 2.83% Asian, 0.03% Pacific Islander, 1.55% from other races, and 1.54% from two or more races. 3.98% of the population was Hispanic or Latino of any race.

There were 174,570 households, out of which 36.00% had children under the age of 18 living with them, 59.20% were married couples living together, 7.80% had a female householder with no husband present, and 30.30% were non-families. 24.50% of all households were made up of individuals, and 6.70% had someone living alone who was 65 years of age or older. The average household size was 2.56 and the average family size was 3.09.

In the county, 27.10% of the population was under the age of 18, 7.60% was from 18 to 24, 32.80% from 25 to 44, 22.50% from 45 to 64, and 10.00% was 65 years of age or older. The median age was 35 years. For every 100 females there were 95.50 males. For every 100 females age 18 and over, there were 92.00 males.

The median income for a household in the county was $61,455, and the median income for a family was $72,987. Males had a median income of $49,790 versus $32,145 for females. The per capita income for the county was $30,919. 3.40% of the population and 2.10% of families were below the poverty line. Out of the total population, 3.30% of those under the age of 18 and 3.60% of those 65 and older were living below the poverty line.

== Economy ==
=== Largest employers ===
Some of the largest employers in Johnson County are:

- AdventHealth Shawnee Mission
- AMC Theatres
- American Academy of Family Physicians
- Bayer HealthCare, LLC-Animal Div
- Black & Veatch Engineering Consultants
- Farmers Insurance
- FedEx Ground Package System, Inc.
- GARMIN International
- Synchrony Financial/GE Credit Services
- Kiewit Power Engineers Company
- OptumRx
- Overland Park Regional Medical Center
- Quest Diagnostics/Lab One
- T-Mobile
- United Parcel Service
- University of Kansas Health System
- Waddell & Reed Financial

== Government ==
=== Laws ===
Johnson County was a prohibition, or "dry", county until the Kansas Constitution was amended in 1986 and voters approved the sale of alcoholic liquor by the individual drink, with a 30% food sales requirement.

The county voted "No" on the 2022 Kansas abortion referendum, an anti-abortion ballot measure, by 69% to 31%, outpacing its support of Joe Biden during the 2020 presidential election.

=== Federal representation ===
Presidential election results

United States presidential election results for Johnson County, Kansas
Year	Republican		Democratic		Third party(ies)	
Year	No.	%	No.	%	No.	%
1880	2,132	58.06%	1,180	32.14%	360	9.80%
1884	2,110	52.87%	1,392	34.88%	489	12.25%
1888	2,164	53.13%	1,435	35.23%	474	11.64%
1892	2,070	50.48%	0	0.00%	2,031	49.52%
1896	2,313	47.82%	2,462	50.90%	62	1.28%
1900	2,393	51.58%	2,171	46.80%	75	1.62%
1904	2,573	61.07%	1,373	32.59%	267	6.34%
1908	2,313	51.17%	2,091	46.26%	116	2.57%
1912	834	19.00%	1,837	41.85%	1,719	39.16%
1916	3,767	47.68%	3,928	49.72%	205	2.59%
1920	4,325	64.27%	2,303	34.22%	101	1.50%
1924	6,102	66.15%	2,519	27.31%	603	6.54%
1928	8,185	70.40%	3,373	29.01%	69	0.59%
1932	6,487	49.53%	6,485	49.52%	124	0.95%
1936	8,399	57.71%	6,108	41.97%	47	0.32%
1940	10,326	63.97%	5,770	35.75%	46	0.28%
1944	11,951	67.24%	5,771	32.47%	51	0.29%
1948	14,191	60.70%	8,982	38.42%	205	0.88%
1952	29,103	72.46%	10,990	27.36%	70	0.17%
1956	35,511	71.40%	14,185	28.52%	37	0.07%
1960	43,026	66.16%	21,914	33.70%	93	0.14%
1964	37,672	54.46%	31,213	45.12%	294	0.42%
1968	55,060	62.63%	26,034	29.61%	6,818	7.76%
1972	76,161	74.14%	24,324	23.68%	2,242	2.18%
1976	75,798	66.41%	35,605	31.19%	2,739	2.40%
1980	78,048	62.95%	33,210	26.79%	12,725	10.26%
1984	101,987	72.39%	38,019	26.99%	876	0.62%
1988	95,591	62.81%	55,183	36.26%	1,425	0.94%
1992	85,418	43.83%	59,573	30.57%	49,875	25.59%
1996	110,368	57.82%	68,129	35.69%	12,397	6.49%
2000	129,965	59.74%	79,118	36.37%	8,453	3.89%
2004	158,103	61.12%	97,866	37.83%	2,718	1.05%
2008	152,627	53.70%	127,091	44.72%	4,493	1.58%
2012	158,401	57.58%	110,526	40.18%	6,147	2.23%
2016	137,490	47.40%	129,852	44.76%	22,748	7.84%
2020	155,631	44.54%	184,259	52.74%	9,496	2.72%
2024	154,247	44.87%	183,451	53.36%	6,082	1.77%

Johnson County is in Kansas's 3rd congressional district, which has been represented by Democrat Sharice Davids since 2019. Kansas's U.S. senators are Republicans Roger Marshall and Jerry Moran.

Johnson County was historically a Republican stronghold. It was won by the GOP in every presidential election from 1920 to 2016, including Barry Goldwater's 1964 election victory despite his statewide loss. The county was one of the few to reject Franklin Roosevelt in all four of his campaigns, with his closest margin coming in 1932, when he lost by just two votes. In 2008, Barack Obama became the first Democrat since Lyndon Johnson to win as much as 40% of the county's vote. In 2016, Republican Donald Trump won the county by less than three points, as the GOP's shift toward right-wing populism alienated moderate and non-populist conservative voters. In 2020, Joe Biden became the first Democrat to win the county since Woodrow Wilson in 1916, securing an 8% margin and the highest share of the vote ever at the time. In 2024, Kamala Harris not only carried the county but also achieved the highest Democratic vote share in its history, becoming the first Democrat to lose a presidential election while carrying Johnson County since 1896. Similar leftward shifts in the county were observed in the state's Senate races in 2020 and 2022. Johnson County is one of nine counties that shifted more than 25 percentage points to the left from 2012 to 2024. Changes in the county may reflect broader political trends in Kansas's suburban areas.

On November 8, 2020, Democrats made historic gains in Johnson County, securing a majority on the Board of Commissioners for the first time in the county's history. In both the 2022 and 2024 elections, Democrats expanded their majority on the Board and flipped the sheriff's office for the first time in 96 years.

=== State representation ===
Johnson County is home to 27 Kansas state representatives and 10 Kansas state senators. 14 out of 27 of Johnson County's representatives are Democrats, as are 4 of the county's 10 senators. Numerous Republicans from the area identify as moderates, compared to some of the more ideological hard-liners from other parts of the state. Differences between moderates and the more hard-line members can most commonly be seen on social issues, the most infamous being the numerous debates about the state's school finance formula in 2004 and 2014–2018.

=== County government and unincorporated areas ===
The county government is administered by an elected, seven-member Board of County Commissioners, with six elected from single-member districts and one at-large. Governance of the county is divided into six districts. The county government has full jurisdiction over the county's unincorporated areas and limited jurisdiction of areas within incorporated places. For instance, decisions about the regulation of land use, development, and zoning in unincorporated areas are the responsibility of the county government, whereas such decisions for areas within incorporated places are the jurisdiction of the incorporated city of which the property is a part.

==== Board of Commissioners ====
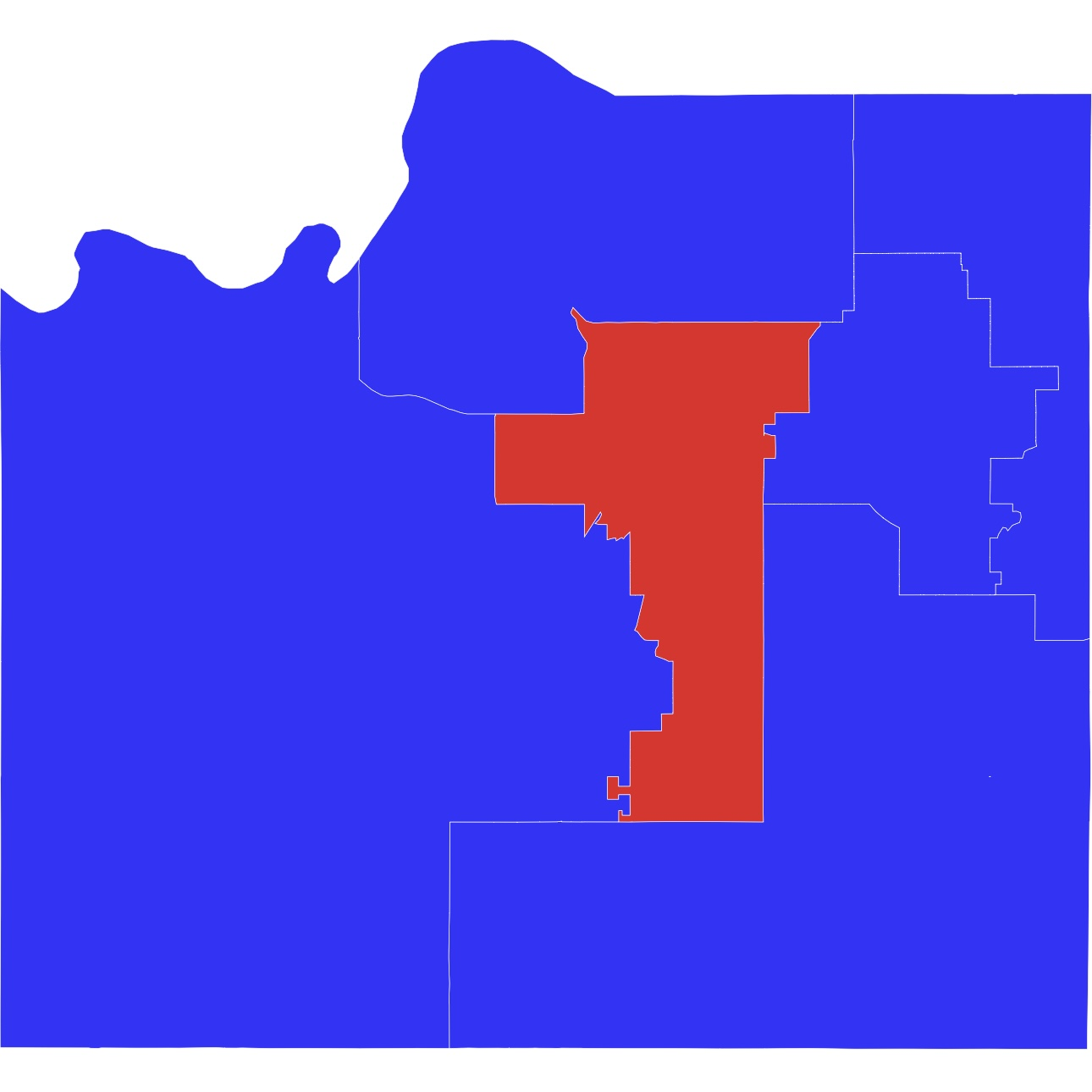
Board of Commissioners districts and party affiliation after the 2024 election Democratic Party Republican Party

As of 2024:

Party	District	Name
Democratic	At-large	Mike Kelly
Democratic	District 1	Becky Fast
Democratic	District 2	Jeff Meyers
Democratic	District 3	Julie Brewer
Democratic	District 4	Janeé Hanzlick
Republican	District 5	Michael Ashcraft
Democratic	District 6	Shirley Allenbrand

==== Elected county officials ====
Party	Office	Name	Reference(s)
Republican	District Attorney	Stephen Howe	
Democratic	Sheriff	Byron Roberson	

=== Sales taxes ===
The sales tax rate in Johnson County is 7.975%, higher than the 6.5% rate in Wyandotte (where Kansas City, Kansas is). The sales tax rates of each of the surrounding counties are nearly the same as Johnson County's. Individual cities have additional sales taxes.

=== Property taxes ===
Property taxes are a conglomeration of state, county, city, and school district taxes. Property tax rates are generally lower in Johnson County because property values in the county are higher than in other counties throughout Kansas.

Property tax rates by city in Johnson County (2005)
City	Commercial	Real property	Motor vehicle
De Soto	3.20	1.47	3.84
Gardner	3.39	1.56	4.07
Leawood	3.39	1.56	4.07
Lenexa	2.75	1.26	3.30
Merriam	2.57	1.18	3.08
Olathe	3.09	1.42	3.71
Overland Park	2.31	1.06	2.77
Prairie Village	2.71	1.25	3.25
Shawnee	2.61	1.20	3.13

Note: Some cities have multiple tax rates because they are divided among multiple school districts. The above rates are what exist for the majority of residents in the city.

== Law enforcement ==
Johnson County Sheriff's Office
- Patch of Johnson County Sheriff's Office
- Abbreviation: JCSO

Agency overview
- Formed: 1861; 165 years ago

Jurisdictional structure
- Operations jurisdiction: Johnson, Kansas, US

Operational structure
- Headquarters: 27747 West 159th Street, New Century, KS 66031
- Agency executive: Calvin Hayden (R), Sheriff

Website
- Official website

The Johnson County Sheriff's Office runs the jails at Olathe and New Century, and patrols the unincorporated parts of Johnson County as well as the cities of Edgerton and DeSoto.

In 2019, the county announced that it was creating a task force with shared jurisdiction between neighboring Miami and Franklin Counties to combat crime.

In April 2024, Johnson County Sheriff Calvin Hayden said he "had a search warrant in hand" when local election officials "decided in a hurry to destroy" ballots from 2019, 2020 and 2021. Kansas state law orders the regular destruction of old ballots, and local officials told Hayden in November 2023 that they would move to destroy the old ballots, which Hayden had asked to be preserved during his investigation of an election software firm. The local prosecutors' office said that it was "unaware of any search warrant being submitted to a judge for review". In May 2024, when Hayden was asked which judge approved his search warrant, Hayden responded: "there's no judge"; when the questioner replied: "A judge has to sign a search warrant to be valid", Hayden responded: "I didn’t say it was valid".

== Education ==
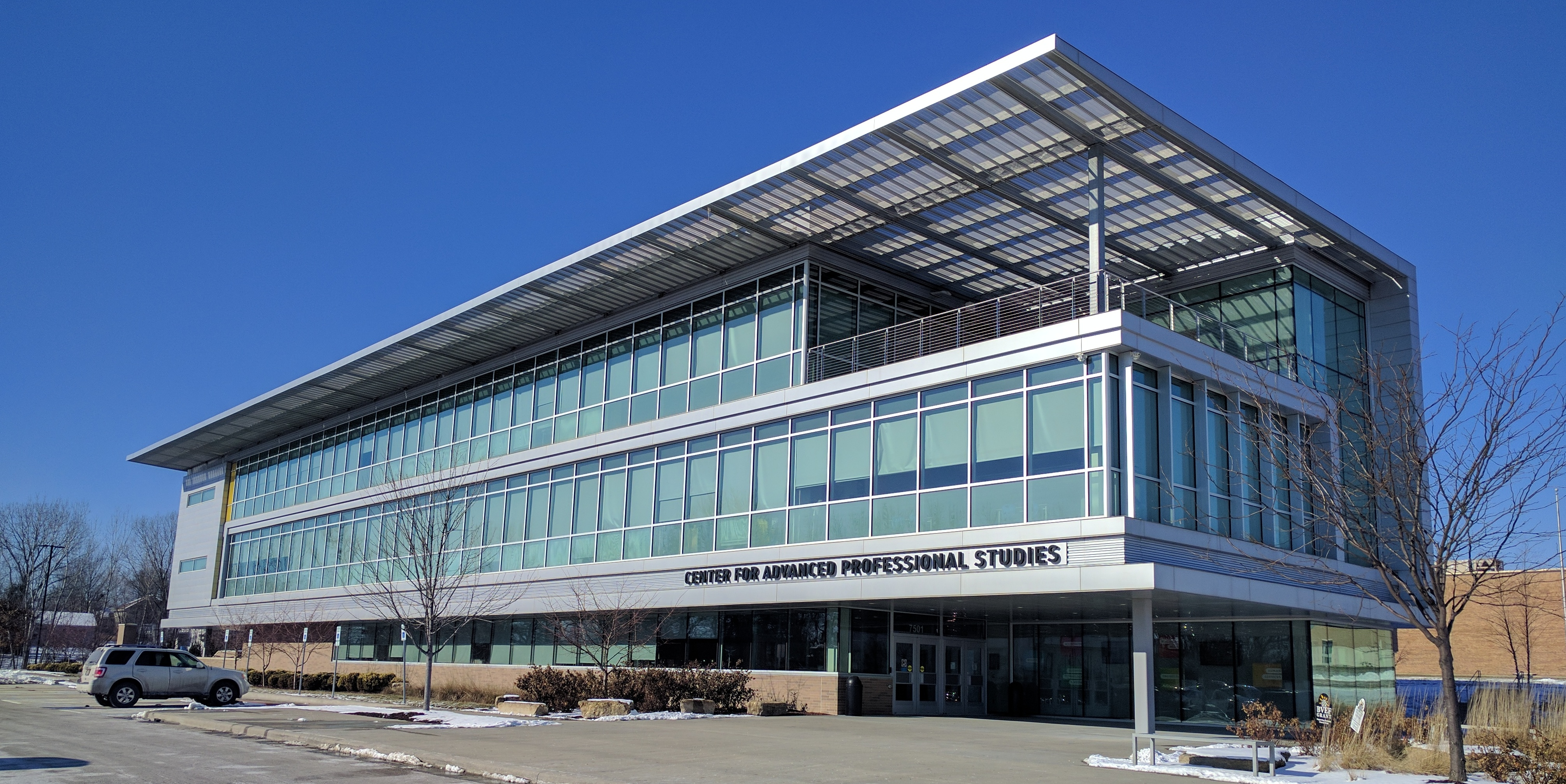
Entrance to the Blue Valley Center for Advanced Professional Studies school in south Overland Park

According to the 2010 Census Bureau, the education attainment of the population 25 years and over: 95.6% high school graduate or higher, 51.1% bachelor's degree or higher, and 17.9% graduate or professional degree.

The Johnson County Library has 13 branches.

=== Unified school districts ===
School districts include:

- Blue Valley USD 229
- De Soto USD 232
- Eudora USD 491
- Gardner-Edgerton USD 231
- Olathe USD 233
- Shawnee Mission USD 512
- Spring Hill USD 230
- Wellsville USD 289

=== Colleges and universities ===
- Johnson County Community College
- University of Kansas Edwards Campus
- Kansas State University, Olathe Campus
- Kansas Christian College (Overland Park)
- MidAmerica Nazarene University
- Baker University, Overland Park Campus
- Ottawa University, Overland Park Campus
- Park University, Lenexa Campus

== Transportation ==
Johnson County has a grid network through most of the county, with a road every mile. The grid has facilitated rapid growth and easy access. Interstate 435 runs through much of the county, and serves as a developmental "border" in the northbound–southbound portion. The westbound–eastbound part of I-435 divides the county into a northern and southern section. The northern section is older, while the southern portion is the fastest-growing area in Johnson County, containing a massive volume of new homes.

The Johnson County numbered street grid generally begins at 47th Street, the Wyandotte County line (the lowest numbered street is 40th Street in Bonner Springs), and is a continuation of the adjacent Kansas City, Missouri, street grid. The grid continues to 215th Street, and into Miami County (with somewhat differently named roads) to 407th Street at the Miami-Linn county line, with most suburban development ending around 167th Street. Named streets in the grid run from State Line Road (1900 West) to County Line Road (40699 West) at the Douglas County line. A portion of the grid extends north from Westwood into the Rosedale area in Kansas City, Kansas.

Another principal highway running through the area is Interstate 35, which runs diagonally through the county, entering it near Downtown Kansas City, and continuing through Olathe and Gardner. Outside the county, it eventually leads to Duluth, Minnesota in the north and the US–Mexico border in the south. U.S. 69 also serves Johnson County, entering from Wyandotte County at the south end of Interstate 635. Much of U.S. 69 within the county is freeway; this freeway eventually heads south and connects to Fort Scott and the rest of southeastern Kansas.

=== Major highways ===
- I-35
- I-435
- I-635
- US-50
- US-56
- US-69
- US-169
- K-7
- K-10

=== Airports ===
Johnson County is home to three general aviation airports:

- Johnson County Executive Airport
- New Century AirCenter
- Hillside Airport

The closest airport with airline service is Kansas City International Airport in Platte County, Missouri

=== Public transit ===
Johnson County Transit is the public transit operator.

== Communities ==
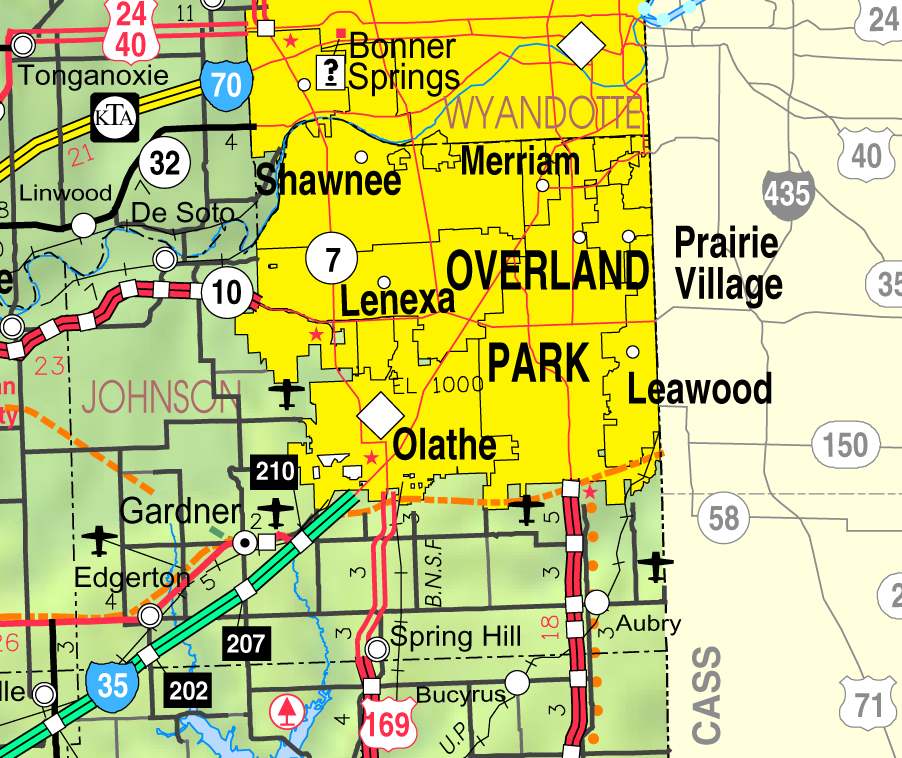
2005 map of Johnson County (map legend)

List of townships / incorporated cities / unincorporated communities / extinct former communities within Johnson County.

=== Cities ===
‡ means a community has portions in an adjacent county.

- Bonner Springs‡
- De Soto‡
- Edgerton
- Fairway
- Gardner
- Lake Quivira‡
- Leawood
- Lenexa
- Merriam
- Mission
- Mission Hills
- Mission Woods
- Olathe (county seat)
- Overland Park
- Prairie Village
- Roeland Park
- Shawnee
- Spring Hill‡
- Westwood
- Westwood Hills

=== Unincorporated communities ===
- Aubry
- Bonita
- Clare
- Ocheltree
- Stilwell
- Wilder

=== Townships ===
Johnson County was originally divided into nine townships, two of which have since been eliminated by the annexation of their territory into independent municipalities. All cities are considered governmentally independent and excluded from the townships' census figures. In this table, the population center is the largest city (or cities) included in that township's population total, if it is of a significant size.

Township	FIPS	Population center	Population	Population density /km^{2} (/sq mi)	Land area km^{2} (sq mi)	Water area km^{2} (sq mi)	Water %	Geographic coordinates
Aubry	03225		5,440	43 (112)	126 (49)	0 (0)	0.31%	38°46′48″N 94°41′4″W
Gardner	25450		2,143	21 (55)	102 (39)	1 (0)	0.53%	38°49′7″N 94°54′31″W
Lexington	39800	De Soto	3,712	10 (25)	135 (52)	2 (1)	1.79%	38°55′0″N 95°0′13″W
McCamish	43625		878	8 (20)	112 (43)	0 (0)	0.34%	38°47′22″N 94°59′48″W
Mission (defunct)	-		0	0 (0)	0 (0)	0 (0)	0%	39°0′7″N 94°38′11″W
Monticello (defunct)	47950		0	0 (0)	0 (0)	0 (0)	0%	39°1′59″N 94°47′57″W
Olathe	52600		1,187	27 (70)	44 (17)	0 (0)	0.04%	38°54′21″N 94°49′18″W
Oxford	53825		2,020	121 (313)	17 (6)	0 (0)	1.54%	38°49′58″N 94°40′54″W
Shawnee (defunct)	64525		0	0 (0)	0 (0)	0 (0)	0%	39°1′51″N 94°47′47″W
Spring Hill	67650		2,059	29 (76)	70 (27)	0 (0)	0.30%	38°46′35″N 94°48′55″W
Sources: "Census 2000 U.S. Gazetteer Files". U.S. Census Bureau, Geography Division. Archived from the original on August 2, 2002.Kansas Historical Society, Johnson County. Retrieved from the website on June 11, 2021.

== In popular culture ==
- The ABC apocalyptic drama film The Day After was partially filmed in De Soto.
- Mission Hills is the setting of the ABC Family show Switched at Birth.
- "Payday", episode 2 of season 1 of the Netflix original documentary Dirty Money, features the infamous predatory loan practices of Scott Tucker, a resident of Leawood. The episode features numerous aerial views of the area.
- The indie film All Creatures Here Below is partially set in De Soto and filmed in Kansas City.

== See also ==
- National Register of Historic Places listings in Johnson County, Kansas

Community information for Kansas

- Kansas locations by per capita income
- List of counties in Kansas
- List of townships in Kansas
- List of cities in Kansas
- List of unincorporated communities in Kansas
- List of ghost towns in Kansas
