= John Henry Balch =

United States Naval Reserve officer

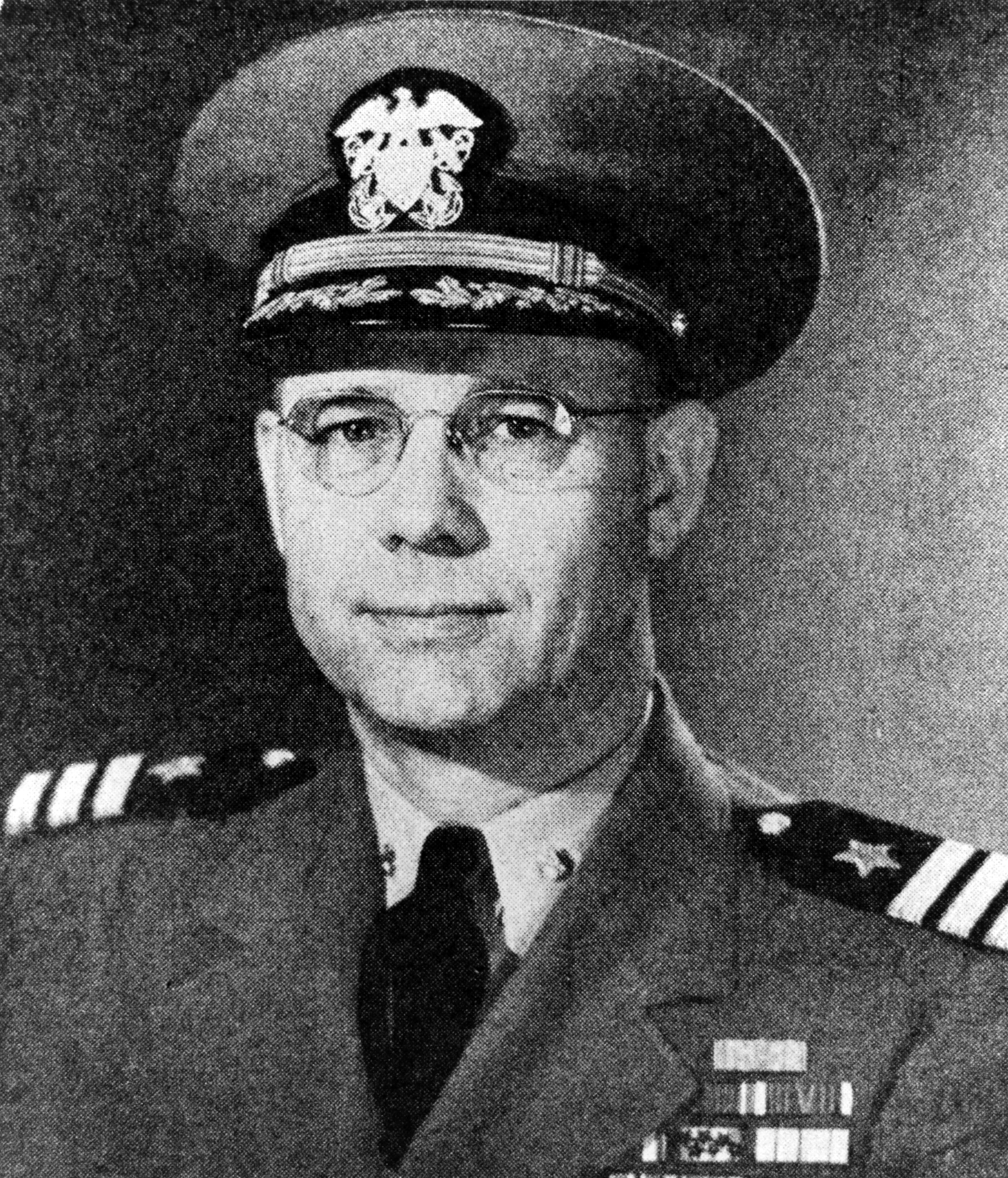
- John H. Balch, Medal of Honor recipient
- Born: January 2, 1896; Edgerton, Kansas, US
- Died: October 15, 1980 (aged 84)
- Burial place: Riverside National Cemetery in Riverside, California
- Military career
- Allegiance: United States of America
- Branch: United States Naval Reserve
- Service years: 1917 – 1919, 1942 – 1950
- Rank: Commander
- Conflicts: World War I: Battle of Belleau Wood; World War II
- Awards: Medal of Honor; Distinguished Service Cross; Silver Star (3); Purple Heart; Croix de Guerre

John Henry Balch (January 2, 1896 – October 15, 1980) was a United States Naval Reserve officer. He received the Medal of Honor for his actions in World War I.

== Education ==
Balch enlisted in the Navy in Kansas City, Missouri under an officers training program. Prior to his enlistment on May 26, 1917, he had been a student at Kansas State University. After the training program, he was assigned to the 3rd Battalion, 6th Marine Regiment and served in France during World War I.

== Military service ==
Prior to the actions in which he was subsequently awarded the Medal of Honor, Balch was involved in the Battle of Belleau Wood where he was wounded. On October 5, 1918, he showed exceptional bravery by establishing an aid station under intense fire. Acting as a Pharmacist's Mate, he was credited with carrying wounded Marines to safety and thereby saving their lives.

On August 19, 1919, Balch received an honorable discharge as a Pharmacist's Mate First Class. One-month later he was presented the Medal of Honor by Rear Admiral F. B. Bassett at the YMCA in Chicago, Illinois.

In September 1942, Balch rejoined the Navy as a lieutenant and served stateside as well as Australia and the Philippines before eventually retiring on June 1, 1950 from the Naval Reserve with the rank of commander and one of the most decorated sailors in US Navy history.

He is buried at Riverside National Cemetery in Riverside, California.

== Medal of Honor citation ==
Rank and organization: Pharmacist's Mate First Class, U.S. Navy. Place and date: Vierzy, France, and Somme-Py, France, July 19, and October 5, 1918. Entered service at: Kansas City, Mo. Born: January 2, 1896, Edgerton, Kansas

Citation:

For gallantry and intrepidity at the risk of his life above and beyond the call of duty, with the 6th Regiment, U.S. Marines, in action at Vierzy, on 19 July 1918. John Balch unhesitatingly and fearlessly exposed himself to terrific machinegun and high-explosive fire to succor the wounded as they fell in the attack, leaving his dressing station voluntarily and keeping up the work all day and late into the night unceasingly for 16 hours. Also in the action at Somme-Py on 5 October 1918, John exhibited exceptional bravery in establishing an advanced dressing station under heavy shellfire.

== Other decorations and awards ==
- Distinguished Service Cross (Interservice Award from US Army)

...During the attack in the Bois-de-Belleau, Pharmacist’s Mate John Balch displayed conspicuous coolness under shell fire in evacuating wounded men. During the action near Vierzy, John worked unceasingly for sixteen hours, giving assistance to the wounded on a field torn by high explosive shells and covered by direct machine-gun fire. Near St. Etienne-aux-Arnes, John again gave proof of excellent judgment and courage in establishing an advance dressing station under violent shell and machine-gun fire, thereby saving many lives which would otherwise have been lost.

- 3 Silver Stars (Interservice Award from US Army)

...Pharmacist's Mate First Class John Balch distinguished himself by gallantry in action while serving as a Corpsman attached to the Sixth Regiment (Marines), 2d Division, American Expeditionary Forces, in action at Bois de Belleau, France. John was conspicuous for his coolness and the value of his work under shell fire, evacuating wounded men at the risk of his life, during our attack upon the enemy on the night of 6 June 1918.

...in action near Somme-Py, France, 5 October 1918. Pharmacist's Mate First Class John Balch displayed extraordinary heroism and bravery in using the best judgment in establishing an advanced aid station during the most intense shell fire, thereby enabling him and his fellow Corpsmen to take better care of the wounded and saving many of their lives.

...distinguished himself by gallantry in action while serving as a Corpsman attached to the Sixth Regiment (Marines), 2d Division, American Expeditionary Forces. Pharmacist's Mate First Class John Balch displayed extraordinary heroism and bravery in action on 5 October 1918, near St. Etienne-a-Arnes, France.

- Navy Commendation Medal
- Purple Heart
- World War I Victory Medal
- American Campaign Medal
- Asiatic-Pacific Campaign Medal
- World War II Victory Medal

=== Foreign Decorations ===
- French Croix de Guerre with Fourragère
- Italian War Merit Cross: Croce al Merito di Guerra
- Portuguese War Cross: Medalha da Cruz de Guerra

== Legacy ==
On 21 July 2005, The Naval Health Clinic at Quantico, Virginia was renamed the John H. Balch Clinic.

In 2018 John Henry Balch became the subject of the short documentary John Henry Balch: Congressional Medal of Honor directed by Sreang "C" Hok, in collaboration with El Dorado Films and the Veteran Documentary Corps.

== See also ==
- List of Medal of Honor recipients
- List of Medal of Honor recipients for World War I
