= Wea Township, Kansas =

Township in Miami County, Kansas, U.S.

Wea Township
- Township
- Location within Miami County
- Coordinates: 38.671455°N 94.664818°W
- Country: United States
- State: Kansas
- County: Miami

Area
  - Total: 43.972 sq mi (113.89 km^{2})
  - Land: 43.649 sq mi (113.05 km^{2})
  - Water: 0.323 sq mi (0.84 km^{2}) 0.73%

Population (2020)
  - Total: 2,023
  - Density: 46.35/sq mi (17.89/km^{2})
- Time zone: UTC-6 (CST)
  - Summer (DST): UTC-5 (CDT)
- Area code: 913

Wea Township is a township in Miami County, Kansas, United States. As of the 2020 census, its population was 2,023.

== Geography ==
Wea Township covers an area of 43.972 square miles (113.89 square kilometers).

=== Communities ===
- Wea

=== Adjacent townships ===
- Aubry Township, Johnson County (north)
- Union Township, Cass County, Missouri (northeast)
- West Dolan Township, Cass County, Missouri (southeast)
- Middle Creek Township, Miami County (south)
- Ten Mile Township, Miami County (west)

=== Major highways ===
- US-69
- K-68
