= Spring Hill Township, Kansas =

Spring Hill Township
- Township
- Location in Johnson County
- Coordinates: 38°46′39″N 94°48′56″W
- Country: United States
- State: Kansas
- County: Johnson

Area
  - Total: 27.01 sq mi (70.0 km^{2})
  - Land: 26.98 sq mi (69.9 km^{2})
  - Water: 0.03 sq mi (0.078 km^{2})
- Elevation: 697 ft (212 m)

Population (2020)
  - Total: 2,004
  - Density: 74.28/sq mi (28.68/km^{2})
- Time zone: Central
- ZIP Codes: 66083, 66062
- Area code: 913
- GNIS ID: 485533

Spring Hill Township is a township in Johnson County, Kansas, United States. As of the 2020 census, its population was 2,004.

== Adjacent townships ==
- Olathe Township (north)
- Gardner Township (west)

== Emergency Services ==
=== Police ===
- Spring Hill Police

=== Fire ===
- Spring Hill Fire

=== Medical (EMS) ===
- Olathe Medical Center
- Miami County Medical Clinic

== Transportation ==
=== Major highways ===
- US-169
- K-7

== School districts ==
- Olathe USD 233
- Spring Hill USD 230
