= Thomas Johnson (Kansas politician) =

American missionary

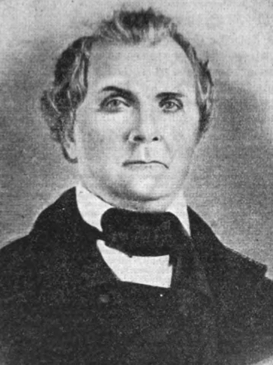
- Born: July 11, 1802
- Died: January 2, 1865 (aged 62); Missouri, U.S.
- Cause of death: Assassination by gunshot
- Occupation: Missionary

Thomas Johnson (July 11, 1802 – January 2, 1865) was an American missionary in Kansas who founded the Shawnee Methodist Mission in 1830. It was intended to serve and convert the Shawnee, several hundred of whom had been relocated to Indian Territory (which became Kansas) from east of the Mississippi River.

Johnson was a Kansas slave holder and sided strongly with the pro-slavery faction during a period known as Bleeding Kansas. Residents on either side of the slavery question recruited newcomers and fought violently prior to voting as to whether slavery would be allowed in the Kansas Territory. Johnson was elected as a member of the Kansas Territorial Legislature, which temporarily designated Shawnee Mission as the state capital from 1855 to 1856. Johnson was pro-Southern in sympathy but signed a Unionist pledge at the time of the American Civil War.

Johnson County, Kansas is named for him.

== Death ==
Johnson was murdered at his home on January 2, 1865, in the last year of the Civil War. It is unknown whether he was killed during a robbery or whether it was a political assassination. Some historians have suggested that his murderers were outraged at his apparent betrayal of the Southern cause.
