= Ochiltree Castle =

Ochiltree Castle may refer to:

- Ochiltree Castle, East Ayrshire, Scotland
- Ochiltree Castle, West Lothian, Scotland
