= Oxford Township, Johnson County, Kansas =

Oxford Township
- Township
- Location in Johnson County
- Coordinates: 38°50′06″N 94°45′10″W
- Country: United States
- State: Kansas
- County: Johnson

Area
  - Total: 43.10 sq mi (111.6 km^{2})
  - Land: 42.98 sq mi (111.3 km^{2})
  - Water: 0.12 sq mi (0.31 km^{2})
- Elevation: 728 ft (222 m)

Population (2020)
  - Total: 2,027
  - Density: 47.16/sq mi (18.21/km^{2})
- Time zone: Central
- ZIP Codes: 66061, 66202
- Area code: 913
- GNIS ID: 479234

Oxford Township is a township in Johnson County, Kansas, United States. As of the 2020 census, its population was 2,027.

== Adjacent townships ==
- Olathe Township (west)

== Cemeteries ==
- Aubry Cemetery

== Emergency Services ==
=== Police ===
- Johnson County Sheriff
- Overland Park Police
- Olathe Police

=== Fire ===
- Johnson County Rural Fire Department
- Overland Park Fire
- Olathe Fire

=== Medical (EMS) ===
- Olathe Medical Center
- Shawnee Mission Medical Center
- Overland Park Regional Medical Center
- Miami County Medical Center

== Transportation ==
=== Major highways ===
- US-69

== School districts ==
- Blue Valley USD 229
