= Ocheltree, Kansas =

Unincorporated community in Kansas, U.S.

Coordinates: 38°49′37″N 94°52′17″W

Ocheltree is an unincorporated community in Johnson County, Kansas, United States, and part of the Kansas City metropolitan area.

== History ==
Ocheltree was laid out in 1867. It was named for W. A. Ocheltree, a member of the town company.

The first post office in Ocheltree was established in December 1869.
