= Olathe Township, Kansas =

Olathe Township
- Township
- Location in Johnson County
- Coordinates: 38°53′33″N 94°53′24″W
- Country: United States
- State: Kansas
- County: Johnson

Area
  - Total: 76.42 sq mi (197.9 km^{2})
  - Land: 70.22 sq mi (181.9 km^{2})
  - Water: 6.20 sq mi (16.1 km^{2})
- Elevation: 780 ft (240 m)

Population (2020)
  - Total: 894
  - Density: 12.7/sq mi (4.92/km^{2})
- Time zone: Central
- ZIP Codes: 66018, 66051, 66061, 66062
- GNIS ID: 479196

Olathe Township is a township in Johnson County, Kansas, United States. As of the 2020 census, its population was 894.

== Adjacent townships ==
- Lexington Township (northwest)
- Gardner Township (southwest)

== Cemeteries ==
- Olathe Memorial Cemetery
- Asa Smith Cemetery

== Emergency Services ==
=== Police ===
- Johnson County Sheriff
- Olathe Police

=== Fire ===
- Olathe Fire Department

=== Medical (EMS) ===
- Johnson County Med-Act

== Transportation ==
=== Highways ===
- I-435
- I-35
- US-56
- US-50
- US-69
- US-169
- K-10
- K-7
- K-150 (decommissioned)

=== Rail ===
- BNSF Railway Emporia Subdivision
- Union Pacific Railway

=== Major Roads ===
- Santa Fe Street (formerly known as K-150)
- Quivira Road
- Metcalf Avenue
- Parker Street
- Mur-Len/Strang Line Road
- Lackman Road
- Blackbob Road
- Cedar Creek Parkway
- College Parkway

== Lakes, streams and ponds ==
- Lake Olathe
- Mill Creek
- Little Mill Creek

== Parks ==
- Ernie Miller Nature Park

== Notable Locations ==
- Johnson County Courthouse
- Olathe Medical Center
- Garmin Headquarters
- Prince of Peace Catholic Church
- Johnson County Airport
- New Century Aircenter

== School districts ==
- Gardner–Edgerton USD 231
- De Soto USD 232
- Olathe USD 233
- Blue Valley USD 229
