= Ochiltree (surname) =

Ochiltree is a surname of Scottish origin. Notable people with the surname include:

- Michael Ochiltree, 15th-century Scottish prelate
- Thomas P. Ochiltree (1837–1902), American politician
- William Beck Ochiltree (1811–1867), American judge

== See also ==
- Tom Ochiltree (1872–1897), American Thoroughbred racehorse
- Edie Ochiltree, Scottish literary character
