= Beni Israel Cemetery =

Cemetery in Douglas County, Kansas

- U.S. National Register of Historic Places
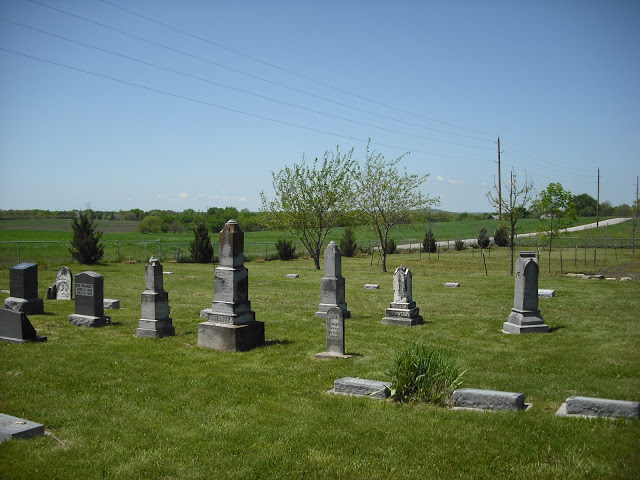
- Beni Israel Cemetery in 2012.

- Location within Kansas Location within the United States
- Location: 1301 E. 2100 Rd., Eudora, Kansas
- Coordinates: 38°55′41″N 95°06′45″W
- Built: 1858
- NRHP reference No.: 12001118
- Added to NRHP: January 2, 2013

Beni Israel Cemetery, also known as Cemetery Beni Israel and today known as B'nai Israel Cemetery, is an historic Jewish cemetery located at 1301 E. 2100 Road in Eudora, Douglas County, Kansas. It was founded in 1858 by German and Polish Jews who were a part of the German Immigrant Settlement Company from Chicago that had founded Eudora in 1856. One-year-old Isaac Cohn who died September 5, 1858, was the first person buried in the cemetery. He was the son of Asher Cohn (1828–1890), an immigrant businessman from Lubawa, Poland who founded a general store in Eudora ca. 1857 and who is also buried here with his wife Sarah. After 1928, burials ceased for decades until 1978 when responsibility for the cemetery was taken on by the Lawrence Jewish Community Congregation of nearby Lawrence.

On January 2, 2013, Beni Israel Cemetery was added to the National Register of Historic Places.

== See also ==
- National Register of Historic Places listings in Douglas County, Kansas
