= Aubry, Kansas =

Unincorporated community in Kansas, U.S.

Coordinates: 38°46′15″N 94°40′16″W

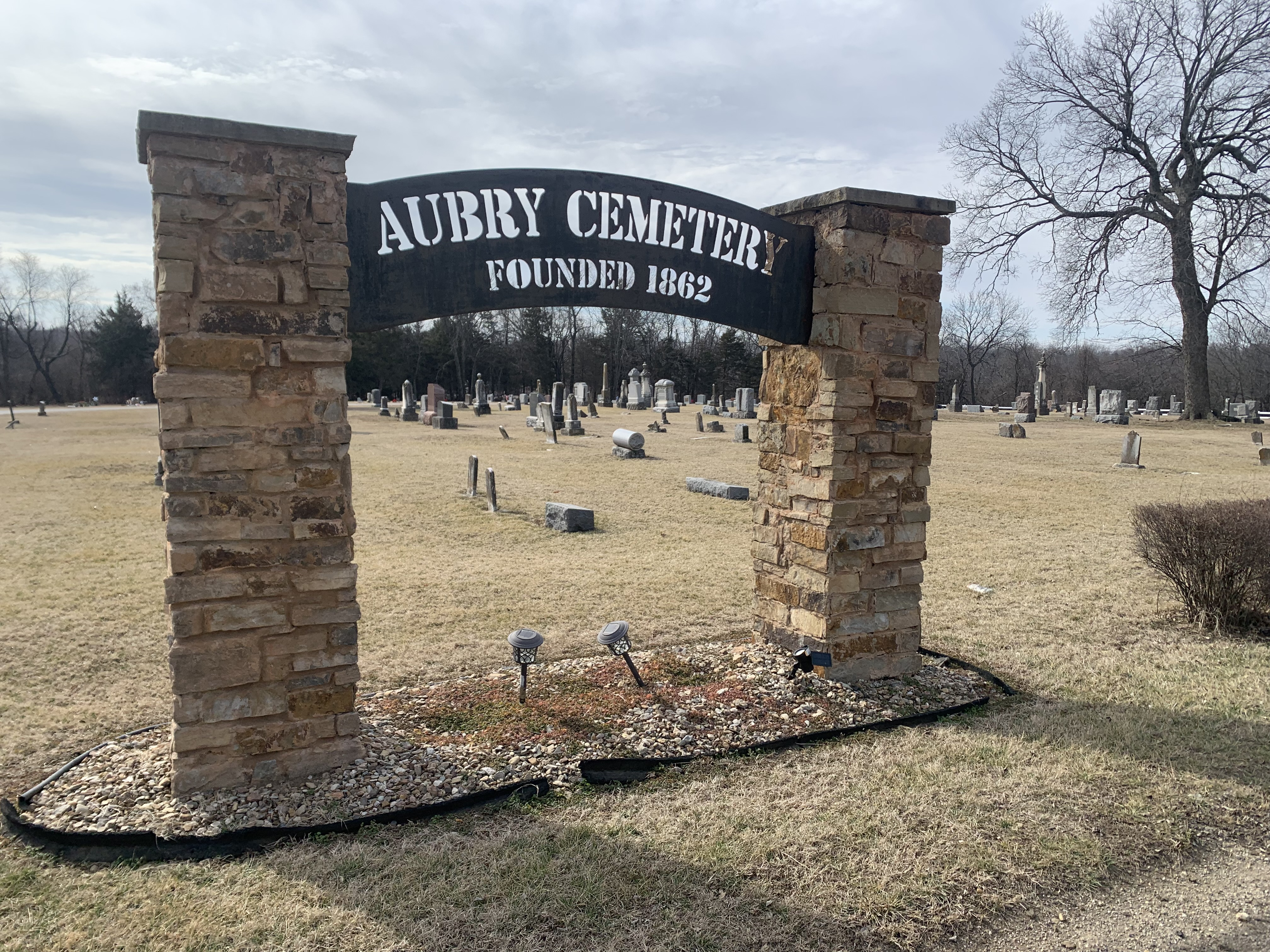
Aubry Cemetery at Aubry, Kansas

Aubry is an unincorporated community in Johnson County, Kansas, United States, and part of the Kansas City metropolitan area.

== History ==
Aubry Township was laid out in 1858. A post office called Aubrey was established in 1860, and remained in operation until being discontinued in 1888.
