= Eudora, Kansas =

- City
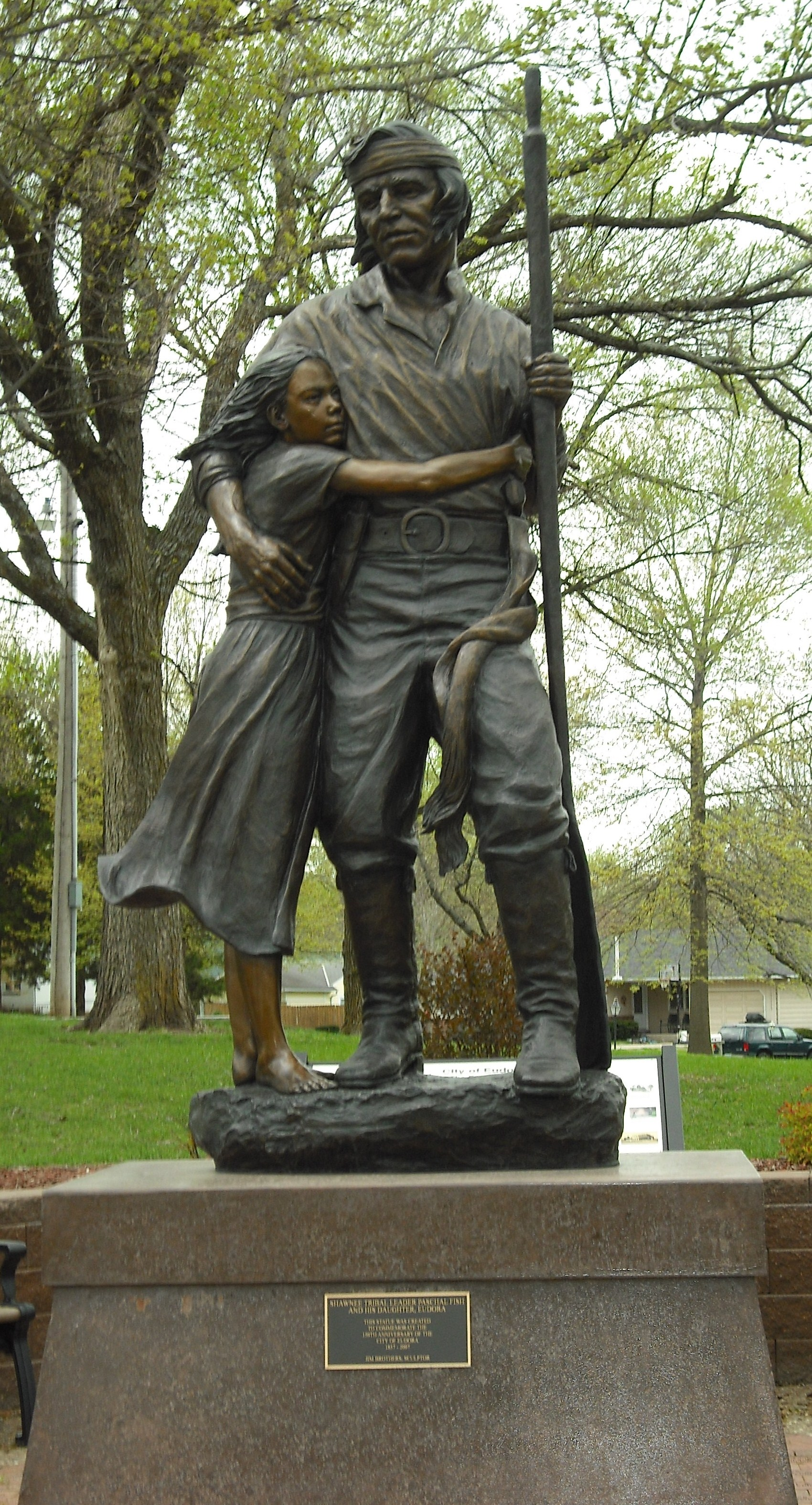
- Statue of Paschal Fish and his daughter Eudora (2011)

- Seal Logo
- Motto: "A Place to Grow"
- Location within Douglas County and Kansas

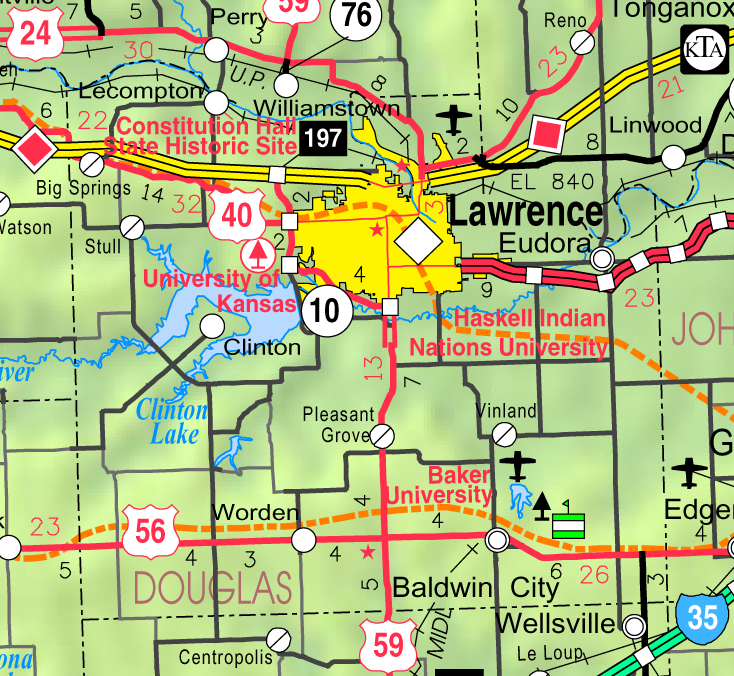
- KDOT map of Douglas County (legend)
- Coordinates: 38°56′04″N 95°05′44″W
- Country: United States
- State: Kansas
- County: Douglas
- Township: Eudora
- Incorporated: 1859

Government
  - Mayor: Tim Bruce

Area
  - Total: 2.98 sq mi (7.73 km^{2})
  - Land: 2.94 sq mi (7.61 km^{2})
  - Water: 0.046 sq mi (0.12 km^{2})
- Elevation: 883 ft (269 m)

Population (2020)
  - Total: 6,408
  - Density: 2,180/sq mi (842/km^{2})
- Time zone: UTC-6 (CST)
  - Summer (DST): UTC-5 (CDT)
- ZIP Code: 66025
- Area code: 785
- FIPS code: 20-21675
- GNIS ID: 2394705
- Website: cityofeudoraks.gov

Eudora is a city in Eudora Township, Douglas County, Kansas, United States, along the Kansas and Wakarusa rivers. As of the 2020 census, the population of the city was 6,408.

== History ==
The Eudora area was home to various Native American tribes for thousands of years. The Kansa tribe lived in the Eudora area from the 1600s to the early 1800s. The Kansa lived along the rivers of this region in villages and practiced agriculture. A Kansa village was located at the site of modern-day Eudora in the 1790s. In the 1820s the Kansa were forcibly removed from the region by the U.S. government to make room for the Shawnee tribe. The Oregon Trail and Santa Fe Trail passed through the region, just a few miles south of modern Eudora.

In 1854 the Kansas–Nebraska Act was passed, creating the Kansas Territory and opening the region to settlement by Americans. As a result of the Kansas–Nebraska Act, Americans settlers started to encroach upon Native American lands. In 1856, three members of a German Immigrant Settlement Company (called Deutsche-Neusiedlungsverein) from Chicago, sent out a location committee to choose a town site in the new Kansas Territory. Favoring the Eudora area, they drew up contracts with Shawnee Chief Paschal Fish, the original owner of the town site. The new town was named Eudora in honor of Chief Fish's daughter. The first post office in Eudora was established in September, 1857. Eudora was incorporated in 1859.

Eudora was the site of conflict during the Bleeding Kansas Era and the American Civil War. Eudora strongly supported the Union during the Civil War, many of its men enlisted to defeat the Confederacy. William Quantrill passed through the Eudora area in 1863 on his way to Lawrence to commit his infamous and deadly raid on the unsuspecting town. Several Eudora residents attempted to warn Lawrence of Quantrill's proximity, but two men were thrown from their horses, one of them dying as a result of his injuries. After the raid, Eudorans were quick to aid the citizens of Lawrence as they started their recovery.

After the Civil War, relative stability finally arrived in the region. Eudora grew rapidly in the late 19th century. In the 1860s, a small Jewish community was based in Eudora. In the late 1800s, a sizeable African American community was based in Eudora; as much as 25% of the Eudora community was Black in 1870. Growth in Eudora leveled in the early 20th century. In recent decades, Eudora has again grown tremendously, as a result of its proximity to Lawrence and Kansas City and its location along Kansas Highway 10.

== Geography ==
According to the United States Census Bureau, the city has a total area of 2.94 square miles (7.61 km^{2}), of which 2.89 square miles (7.49 km^{2}) is land and 0.05 square miles (0.13 km^{2}) is water.

== Demographics ==
Historical population
| Census | Pop. | Note | %± |
|---|---|---|---|
| 1880 | 572 | | — |
| 1890 | 618 | | 8.0% |
| 1900 | 640 | | 3.6% |
| 1910 | 640 | | 0.0% |
| 1920 | 627 | | −2.0% |
| 1930 | 599 | | −4.5% |
| 1940 | 713 | | 19.0% |
| 1950 | 1,488 | | 108.7% |
| 1960 | 1,532 | | 3.0% |
| 1970 | 2,091 | | 36.5% |
| 1980 | 3,112 | | 48.8% |
| 1990 | 3,006 | | −3.4% |
| 2000 | 4,307 | | 43.3% |
| 2010 | 6,136 | | 42.5% |
| 2020 | 6,408 | | 4.4% |
| 2025 (est.) | 6,506 | | 1.5% |
U.S. Decennial Census; 2010-2020

Eudora is part of the Lawrence, Kansas Metropolitan Statistical Area.

=== 2020 census ===
As of the 2020 census, Eudora had a population of 6,408 and 1,643 families. The median age was 35.2 years. 29.3% of residents were under the age of 18 and 11.7% of residents were 65 years of age or older. For every 100 females there were 98.5 males, and for every 100 females age 18 and over there were 95.2 males age 18 and over.

99.3% of residents lived in urban areas, while 0.7% lived in rural areas.

There were 2,296 households in Eudora, of which 42.3% had children under the age of 18 living in them. Of all households, 53.1% were married-couple households, 16.0% were households with a male householder and no spouse or partner present, and 22.3% were households with a female householder and no spouse or partner present. About 23.0% of all households were made up of individuals and 9.0% had someone living alone who was 65 years of age or older.

There were 2,412 housing units, of which 4.8% were vacant. The homeowner vacancy rate was 1.0% and the rental vacancy rate was 3.5%. The population density was 2,181.8 per square mile (842.4/km^{2}), and there were 821.2 housing units per square mile (317.1/km^{2}).

Racial composition as of the 2020 census
| Race | Number | Percent |
|---|---|---|
| White | 5,600 | 87.4% |
| Black or African American | 53 | 0.8% |
| American Indian and Alaska Native | 91 | 1.4% |
| Asian | 32 | 0.5% |
| Native Hawaiian and Other Pacific Islander | 6 | 0.1% |
| Some other race | 73 | 1.1% |
| Two or more races | 553 | 8.6% |
| Hispanic or Latino (of any race) | 393 | 6.1% |

Non-Hispanic White residents were 85.35% of the population.

=== Demographic estimates ===
The average household size was 3.0 and the average family size was 3.3. The percent of those with a bachelor's degree or higher was estimated to be 22.9% of the population.

=== Income and poverty ===
The 2016–2020 5-year American Community Survey estimates show that the median household income was $87,392 (with a margin of error of +/- $11,279) and the median family income was $89,072 (+/- $10,385). Males had a median income of $51,387 (+/- $6,172) versus $30,748 (+/- $5,351) for females. The median income for those above 16 years old was $39,568 (+/- $7,479). Approximately, 8.7% of families and 10.4% of the population were below the poverty line, including 16.4% of those under the age of 18 and 2.9% of those ages 65 or over.

=== 2010 census ===
As of the census of 2010, there were 6,136 people, 2,210 households, and 1,600 families living in the city. The population density was 2,123.2 inhabitants per square mile (819.8/km^{2}). There were 2,306 housing units at an average density of 797.9 per square mile (308.1/km^{2}). The racial makeup of the city was 93.3% White, 0.8% African American, 1.6% Native American, 0.7% Asian, 0.8% from other races, and 2.8% from two or more races. Hispanic or Latino of any race were 4.5% of the population.

There were 2,210 households, of which 44.2% had children under the age of 18 living with them, 57.5% were married couples living together, 10.6% had a female householder with no husband present, 4.3% had a male householder with no wife present, and 27.6% were non-families. 22.8% of all households were made up of individuals, and 7.7% had someone living alone who was 65 years of age or older. The average household size was 2.75 and the average family size was 3.25.

The median age in the city was 31.8 years. 31% of residents were under the age of 18; 7.1% were between the ages of 18 and 24; 32.1% were from 25 to 44; 20.9% were from 45 to 64; and 8.8% were 65 years of age or older. The gender makeup of the city was 49.5% male and 50.5% female.

== Government ==
The Eudora government consists of five City Commissioners, which elects the Mayor. The City Commission meets the second and fourth Monday of each month at 7PM.

- City Hall, 4 East 7th St.

Representation

- Derek Schmidt in Kansas' 2nd Congressional District
- Beverly Gossage in the State Senate
- Lance Neelly in the State House of Representatives
- Gene Dorsey in the Douglas County Commission

== Education ==
The community is served by Eudora USD 491 public school district.

== Transportation ==
Eudora is directly served by three state highways, three county highways and a direct route to one national highway and to one interstate highway:

- US-56, I-70
- K-10, K-32, K-33
- CR 442, CR 1061, CR 458

== Notable people ==
- Chase Austin, NASCAR driver
- Mitch Ballock, professional basketball player, former basketball at Creighton University
- Debra Barnes, 1968 Miss America
- Hugh Beaumont, actor
- Vic Edelbrock, manufacturer, automotive engineer
- Charles Parham, involved in the founding of Pentecostalism, presided over Methodist Church services from 1892 to 1894
- Andrew Taylor Still, founder of the pseudoscientific field of Osteopathic medicine

== See also ==
- Beni Israel Cemetery, added to the National Register of Historic Places list in January 2013
- Eudora Kaw River Bridge, bridge over the Kansas River about 0.5 mile north of Eudora
