= Eudora USD 491 =

Public school district in Eudora, Kansas

Address
- 1310 Winchester Rd. Eudora, Kansas, 66025; United States
- Coordinates: 38.89693°N 95.07998°W

District information
- Type: Public
- Grades: K to 12

Other information
- Website: eudoraschools.org

Eudora USD 491 is a public unified school district headquartered in Eudora, Kansas, United States. The district includes the communities of Eudora, Hesper, and nearby rural areas.

== Schools ==
The school district operates the following schools:

- Eudora High School
- Eudora Middle School
- Eudora Elementary School
- Eudora Early Childhood Program

Others:

- Eudora-DeSoto Technical Education Center
- Eudora Virtual Learning Center

== History ==
The district originated from the first municipal school facility, then in city hall, circa 1856.

== See also ==
- Kansas State Department of Education
- Kansas State High School Activities Association
- List of high schools in Kansas
- List of unified school districts in Kansas
