= Edgerton, Kansas =

- City
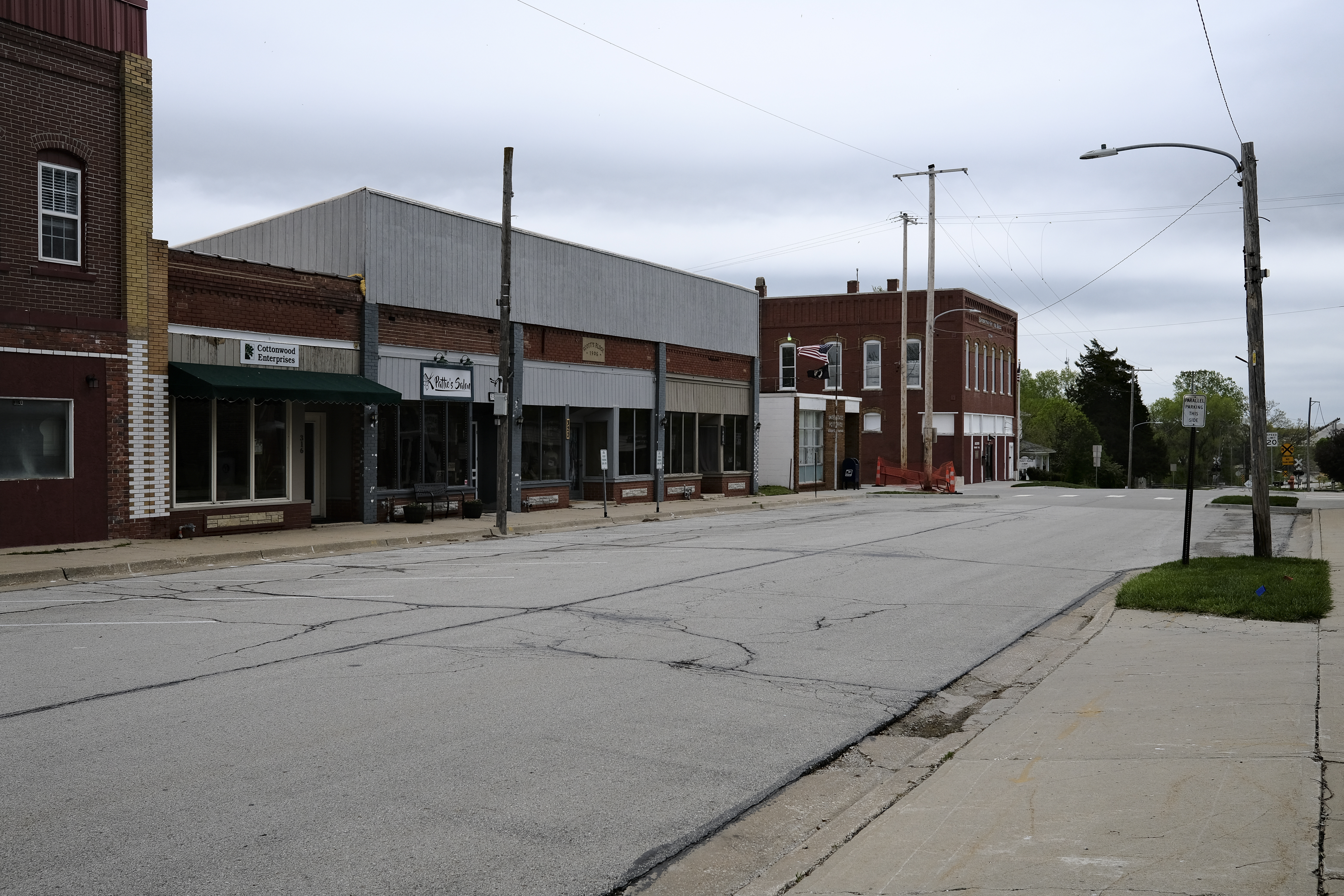
- Nelson Street (2022)

- Flag

- Location within Johnson County and Kansas
- Interactive map of Edgerton, Kansas
- Coordinates: 38°45′38″N 95°00′41″W
- Country: United States
- State: Kansas
- County: Johnson
- Founded: 1870
- Incorporated: 1883

Area
  - Total: 7.39 sq mi (19.15 km^{2})
  - Land: 7.33 sq mi (18.98 km^{2})
  - Water: 0.062 sq mi (0.16 km^{2})
- Elevation: 1,034 ft (315 m)

Population (2020)
  - Total: 1,748
  - Density: 238.5/sq mi (92.10/km^{2})
- Time zone: UTC-6 (CST)
  - Summer (DST): UTC-5 (CDT)
- ZIP Code: 66021
- Area code: 913
- FIPS code: 20-19825
- GNIS ID: 485565
- Website: edgertonks.org

Edgerton is a city in Johnson County, Kansas, United States, and part of the Kansas City metropolitan area. As of the 2020 census, the population of the city was 1,748. It is home to a large BNSF intermodal train facility named Logistics Park Kansas City.

== History ==
Edgerton was founded in 1870 when the railroad was extended to that point. It was named for the chief engineer of the Atchison, Topeka and Santa Fe Railway.

In October 2010, BNSF Railway announced plans to build its new 443-acre $250 million intermodal shipping facility in Edgerton, and after completion will replace the current one in Kansas City, Kansas. An adjacent $500 million industrial park with more than 7,000,000 square feet (650,000 m^{2}) of warehouse space will be built over 10 years. It officially opened in October 2013. When the logistics park is fully built out, according to its 1,550-acre master plan, its capacity at that point will be 1.5 million containers annually.

In August 2026, the city filed suit against two women and a nonprofit for organizing a petition against plans for a data center.

== Geography ==
According to the United States Census Bureau, the city has a total area of 2.22 square miles (5.75 km^{2}), of which 2.18 square miles (5.65 km^{2}) is land and 0.04 square miles (0.10 km^{2}) is water.

== Demographics ==
Historical population
Census	Pop.	Note	%±
1890	321		—
1900	310		−3.4%
1910	443		42.9%
1920	323		−27.1%
1930	278		−13.9%
1940	264		−5.0%
1950	266		0.8%
1960	414		55.6%
1970	513		23.9%
1980	1,214		136.6%
1990	1,244		2.5%
2000	1,440		15.8%
2010	1,671		16.0%
2020	1,748		4.6%
U.S. Decennial Census

=== Racial and ethnic composition ===
Edgerton city, Kansas – Racial and ethnic composition Note: the US Census treats Hispanic/Latino as an ethnic category. This table excludes Latinos from the racial categories and assigns them to a separate category. Hispanics/Latinos may be of any race.
Race / Ethnicity (NH = Non-Hispanic)	Pop 2000	Pop 2010	Pop 2020	% 2000	% 2010	% 2020
White alone (NH)	1,360	1,514	1,457	94.44%	90.60%	83.35%
Black or African American alone (NH)	5	14	23	0.35%	0.84%	1.32%
Native American or Alaska Native alone (NH)	20	10	14	1.39%	0.60%	0.80%
Asian alone (NH)	3	4	5	0.21%	0.24%	0.29%
Native Hawaiian or Pacific Islander alone (NH)	0	0	0	0.00%	0.00%	0.00%
Other race alone (NH)	0	0	3	0.00%	0.00%	0.17%
Mixed race or Multiracial (NH)	20	57	125	1.39%	3.41%	7.15%
Hispanic or Latino (any race)	32	72	121	2.22%	4.31%	6.92%
Total	1,440	1,671	1,748	100.00%	100.00%	100.00%

=== 2020 census ===
As of the 2020 census, there were 1,748 people, 616 households, and 458 families living in Edgerton. The population density was 238.5 per square mile (92.1/km^{2}), and there were 647 housing units at an average density of 88.3 per square mile (34.1/km^{2}).

0.3% of residents lived in urban areas, while 99.7% lived in rural areas.

Of all households, 43.5% had children under the age of 18 living in them. 52.9% were married-couple households, 19.6% were households with a male householder and no spouse or partner present, and 17.5% were households with a female householder and no spouse or partner present. About 18.9% of all households were made up of individuals, and 5.2% had someone living alone who was 65 years of age or older.

The median age was 34.5 years. 28.9% of residents were under the age of 18, 6.9% were from 18 to 24, 31.4% were from 25 to 44, 22.5% were from 45 to 64, and 10.3% were 65 years of age or older. For every 100 females there were 107.4 males, and for every 100 females age 18 and over there were 107.0 males age 18 and over.

Of the housing units, 4.8% were vacant. The homeowner vacancy rate was 0.6% and the rental vacancy rate was 1.5%.

Racial composition as of the 2020 census
Race	Number	Percent
White	1,496	85.6%
Black or African American	24	1.4%
American Indian and Alaska Native	14	0.8%
Asian	5	0.3%
Native Hawaiian and Other Pacific Islander	2	0.1%
Some other race	43	2.5%
Two or more races	164	9.4%

The non-Hispanic white population was 83.35%.

=== Demographic estimates ===
The average household size was 2.8 and the average family size was 3.1. The percent of those with a bachelor's degree or higher was estimated to be 11.8% of the population.

=== Income and poverty ===
The 2016–2020 5-year American Community Survey estimates show that the median household income was $70,938 (with a margin of error of +/- $10,730) and the median family income was $69,661 (+/- $5,783). Males had a median income of $44,511 (+/- $4,260) versus $35,789 (+/- $9,337) for females. The median income for those above 16 years old was $42,702 (+/- $2,887). Approximately, 2.3% of families and 4.3% of the population were below the poverty line, including 6.2% of those under the age of 18 and 1.6% of those ages 65 or over.

=== 2010 census ===
As of the census of 2010, there were 1,671 people, 591 households, and 450 families living in the city. The population density was 766.5 inhabitants per square mile (295.9/km^{2}). There were 645 housing units at an average density of 295.9 per square mile (114.2/km^{2}). The racial makeup of the city was 93.7% White, 0.8% African American, 0.6% Native American, 0.3% Asian, 0.8% from other races, and 3.8% from two or more races. Hispanic or Latino of any race were 4.3% of the population.

There were 591 households, of which 42.8% had children under the age of 18 living with them, 58.4% were married couples living together, 12.7% had a female householder with no husband present, 5.1% had a male householder with no wife present, and 23.9% were non-families. 18.3% of all households were made up of individuals, and 3.7% had someone living alone who was 65 years of age or older. The average household size was 2.83 and the average family size was 3.25.

The median age in the city was 32.1 years. 29.3% of residents were under the age of 18; 8.4% were between the ages of 18 and 24; 31.4% were from 25 to 44; 24.8% were from 45 to 64; and 6.2% were 65 years of age or older. The gender makeup of the city was 52.8% male and 47.2% female.

== Libraries ==
The Johnson County Library system includes 13 locations throughout Johnson County, including the Edgerton Library.

== Notable people ==
Notable individuals who were born in and/or have lived in Edgerton include:

- John Henry Balch (1896–1980), U.S. Naval Reserve Commander, Medal of Honor recipient

== See also ==
- Hillsdale Lake and Hillsdale State Park
- Santa Fe Trail
