= K-10 (Kansas highway) =

State highway in Kansas, U.S.

K-10
- K-10 highlighted in red

Route information
- Maintained by KDOT
- Length: 36.611 mi (58.920 km)
- Existed: 1929–present

Major junctions
- West end: I-70 / Kansas Turnpike in Lawrence
- US-40 in Lawrence; US-40 / US-59 in Lawrence; K-7 near Lenexa
- East end: I-435 in Lenexa

Location
- Country: United States
- State: Kansas
- Counties: Douglas, Johnson

Highway system
- Kansas State Highway System; Interstate; US; State; Spurs
| ← K-9 | → K-11 |

K-10 is a 36.611-mile-long (58.920 km) state highway in the U.S. state of Kansas. It was originally designated in 1929. It is mostly a controlled-access freeway, linking Lawrence to Lenexa. It provides an important toll-free alternate route to Interstate 70 (the Kansas Turnpike). Several scenes for the TV-movie The Day After were filmed on the highway at De Soto in 1982 portraying a mass exodus evacuating the Kansas City area on I-70. This originally 2 lane highway has been converted to a 4 lane divided highway.

== Route description ==
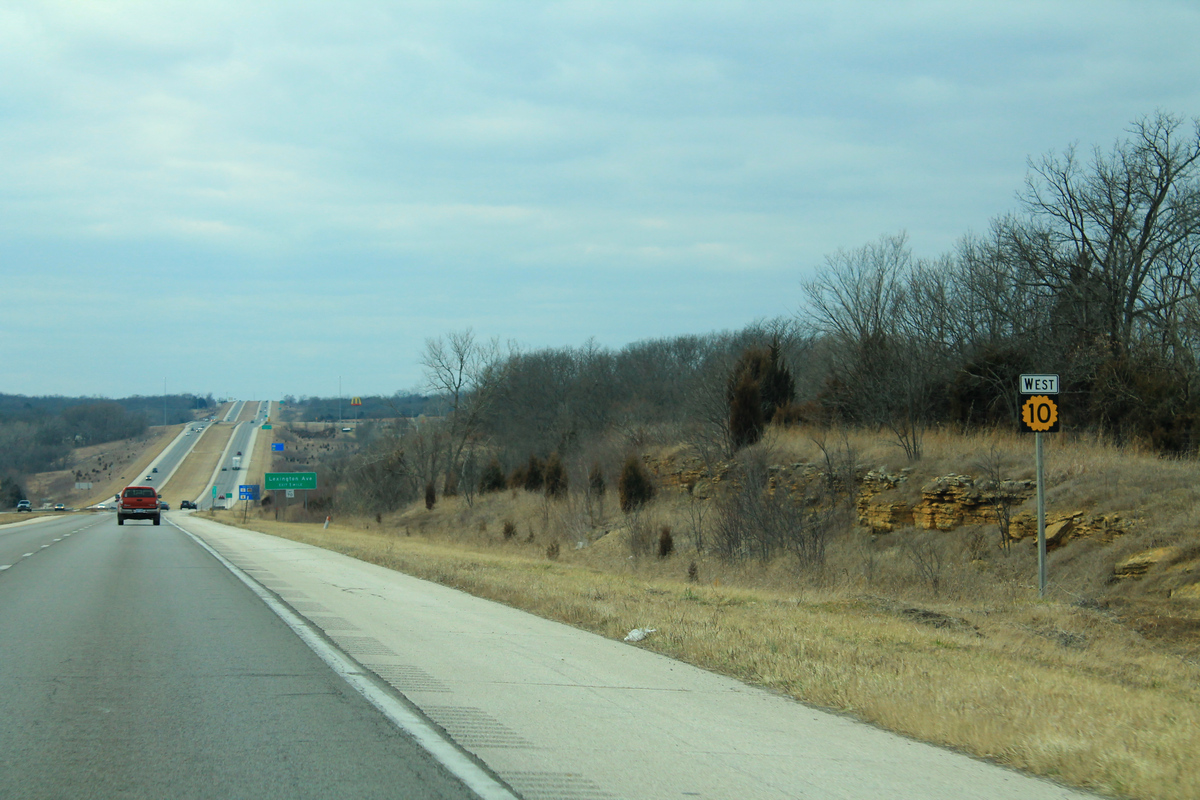
K-10 westbound in De Soto

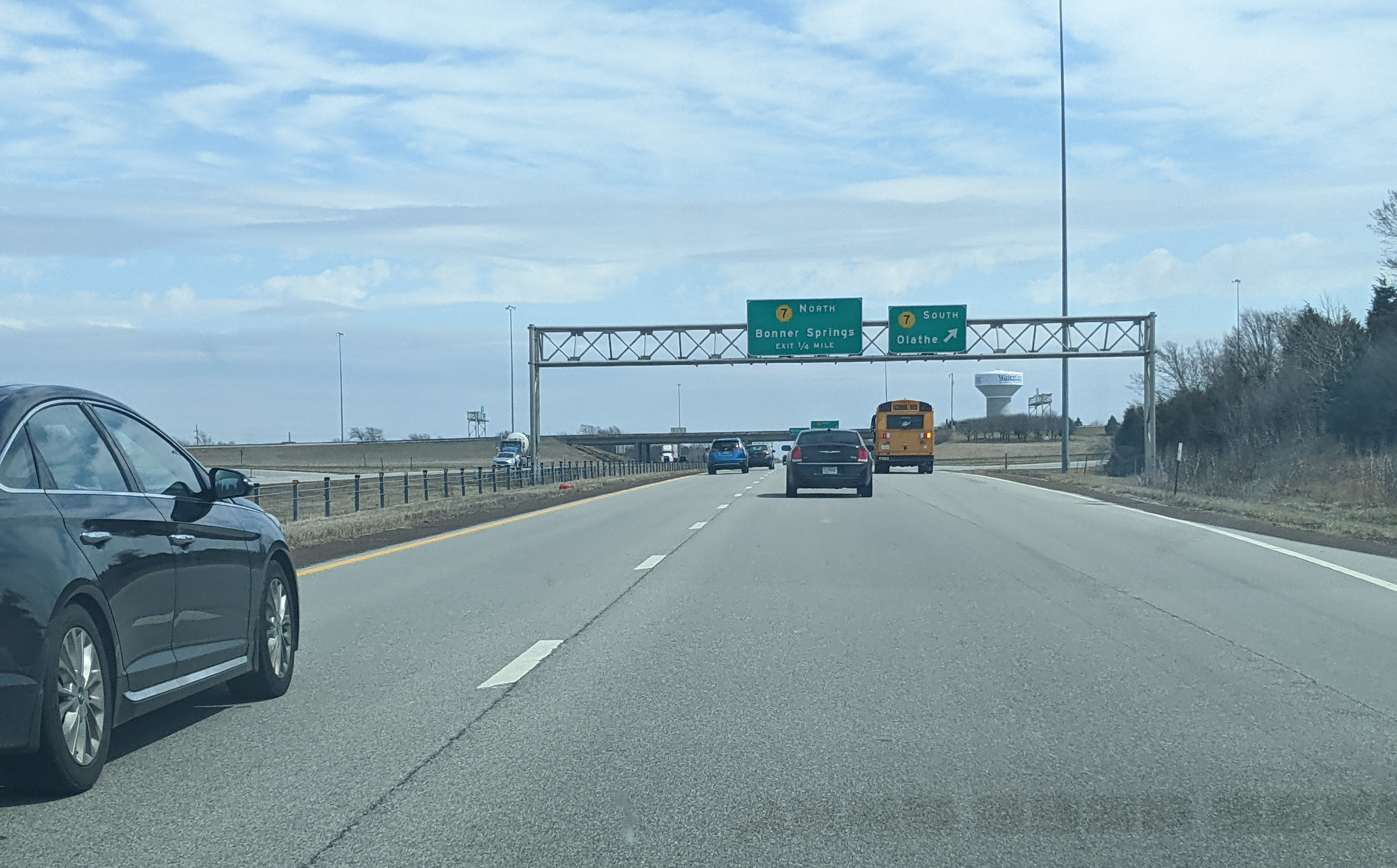
K-7 Junction from westbound K-10 in Olathe

The highway's western end begins as a two-lane highway (a super-two at I-70 exit 197, just west of Lawrence. It bypasses the city to the south, providing access to Clinton Lake, and also intersects with U.S. Route 59, beginning a four lane freeway after the interchange. K-10 continues to the northeast on the new South Lawrence Trafficway (completed 2016) before interchanging with 23rd Street (Old K-10). After exiting Lawrence eastbound, it passes through the city of Eudora, and then the cities of De Soto and Olathe, suburbs of Kansas City. It then terminates at an interchange with Interstate 435 and Interstate 35 in Lenexa. In Johnson County, the road is called the Governor John Anderson, Jr. Highway.

== History ==
K-10 originally extended west of Lawrence to Herington, via Alta Vista, Alma, and Topeka. In 1956 the portion between Topeka and K-99 near Alma was designated as US-40 in preparation for upgrading this stretch to Interstate standards (for I-70). The segment between Alta Vista and Herington was redesignated as K-4 and K-10 was truncated eastward to Lawrence.

The process of upgrading K-10 to a freeway was begun in 1974. The first section completed was the section from De Soto to the junction with K-7, opening on November 8, 1976. The freeway was finally completed on December 18, 1984, when the stretch from K-7 to I-435 was completed. The old two-lane roadbed of K-10 was turned over to the counties to use as a secondary route. In Douglas County it became CR 442, although many of the locals, especially in Eudora, commonly refer to it as Old K-10.

The portion of K-10 between the Edgerton Road exit and the De Soto interchange at former K-285 (now Lexington Avenue) was used in the movie The Day After and, for the purposes of the film, was temporarily redesignated Interstate 70.

=== South Lawrence Trafficway ===
In the early 1970s traffic studies of K-10 determined a bypass around the west and south sides of Lawrence was necessary, and the Kansas Department of Transportation commenced due diligence on the bypass project. The bypass on the west side of Lawrence was completed in November 1996. Prior to the opening of the trafficway, K-10 had ended at the junction of US-40 and US-59 in Lawrence. Completion of the eastern leg of the trafficway was delayed for nearly three decades by lawsuits from environmentalist groups and Haskell University, as the planned route took the highway through the Haskell-Baker Wetlands. In October 2012, the deadline for the plaintiffs of the lawsuits to seek a Supreme Court review of the case passed, and a mitigation plan for the wetlands was added to the trafficway plans. Construction began on November 12, 2013, and was anticipated to be completed by Fall 2016 before Thanksgiving. The ribbon cutting ceremony for the trafficway was held on November 4, 2016, and in attendance were many local and state leaders including Governor Sam Brownback and Senator Pat Roberts. The trafficway officially opened to all traffic on November 9, 2016.

== Future ==
=== South Lawrence Trafficway ===
In spring 2020, KDOT announced it was evaluating three alternatives to reconstruct the interchange with K-10 and I-70, and to add a grade separated interchange to the K-10 / Wakarusa Drive intersection (although an interchange at Wakarusa was considered at least as early as 2016). The preferred alternative was to be identified in the fall of 2020. The formal Notice of Availability (NOA) for the project documents was published in the Federal Register on April 1, 2022.

The design was finalized and construction began in late 2024.

== Junction list ==
| County | Location | mi | km | Exit | Destinations | Notes |
|---|---|---|---|---|---|---|
| Douglas | Kanwaka Township | 0.000 | 0.000 | — | I-70 / Kansas Turnpike – Topeka, Kansas City | Western terminus; I-70 / KTA exit 197; partial cloverleaf interchange; to be rebuilt into a system-to-system interchange |
| Douglas | Kanwaka Township | 0.300 | 0.483 | 1 | CR 438 – Lecompton | Left exit westbound |
| Douglas | Lawrence | 1.874 | 3.016 | 2A | US-40 west (6th Street) – Lawrence, Topeka | Western end of US-40 overlap; diverging diamond interchange opened on September 9th 2024 |
| Douglas | Lawrence | | | 2B | Bob Billings Parkway / N 1500 Road | Diamond interchange, opened December 2015 |
| Douglas | Lawrence | | | 4 | Clinton Parkway | East end of two-lane expressway |
| Douglas | Lawrence | | | 5 | Wakarusa Drive / 27th Street | Proposed folded diamond interchange, currently open as an at-grade signal-controlled intersection |
| Douglas | Lawrence | 8.429 | 13.565 | 8 | US-40 east / US-59 – Lawrence, Ottawa | Eastern end of US-40 overlap; diamond interchange; west end of freeway |
| Douglas | Lawrence | 10.724 | 17.259 | 10 | CR 1055 (E 1500 Road) / Haskell Avenue | Partial cloverleaf interchange, opened November 2016 |
| Douglas | Lawrence | | | 13 | 23rd Street | Directional T interchange; formerly K-10 west |
| Douglas | | 14.869 | 23.929 | 15 | CR 1057 (E 1900 Road) | Diamond interchange |
| Douglas | Eudora | 17.843 | 28.716 | 18 | CR 1061 (Church Street / E 2200 Road) – Eudora | Diamond interchange |
| Douglas | Eudora | 19.268 | 31.009 | 19 | CR 442 (N 1400 Road) | Old K-10; diamond interchange |
| Johnson | | | | 21 | Evening Star Road | Diamond interchange |
| Johnson | | | | 22 | Edgerton Road | Diamond interchange |
| Johnson | De Soto | 24.637 | 39.649 | 24 | Lexington Avenue | Partial cloverleaf interchange; former alignment of K-10; designated as K-285 until its decommissioning in 1997 |
| Johnson | De Soto | | | 26 | Kill Creek Road | Diamond interchange |
| Johnson | Lenexa–Olathe line | | | 30 | Cedar Creek Parkway | Diamond interchange |
| Johnson | Lenexa–Olathe line | 31.980 | 51.467 | 32A-B | K-7 – Bonner Springs, Olathe | Cloverleaf interchange |
| Johnson | Lenexa–Olathe line | | | 34 | Woodland Road | Diamond interchange |
| Johnson | Lenexa–Olathe line | | | 35 | Ridgeview Road | Diverging diamond interchange; prior interchange converted July 2015 |
| Johnson | Lenexa | | | 36 | Renner Boulevard | Partial cloverleaf interchange |
| Johnson | Lenexa | 36.611 | 58.920 | — | I-435 to I-35 / Renner Boulevard, Lackman Road – Wichita, Des Moines | Eastern terminus; I-435 exit 1B |
1.000 mi = 1.609 km; 1.000 km = 0.621 mi: Concurrency terminus; Tolled; Unopened

== See also ==
- List of state highways in Kansas
