= Gardner–Edgerton USD 231 =

Public school district in Gardner, Kansas

Address
- 231 East Madison Street Gardner, Kansas, 66030; United States
- Coordinates: 38°48′54″N 94°55′25″W

District information
- Type: Public
- Grades: Pre-K to 12
- Superintendent: Brian Huff
- School board
- Schools: 9
- NCES District ID: 2006420

Students and staff
- Students: 5,831 (2020–2021)
- Teachers: 473.5 (on an FTE basis)
- Staff: 346.2 (on an FTE basis)
- Student–teacher ratio: 12.31:1
- Athletic conference: Sunflower League
- Colors: Blue; Gray

Other information
- Website: usd231.com

Gardner–Edgerton USD 231 is a public unified school district headquartered in Gardner, Kansas, United States. The district includes the communities of Gardner, Edgerton, and nearby rural areas. It also includes sections of Olathe. This district is mostly in Johnson County, it extends into Miami County.

== History ==
Being located in the rapidly growing southern portion of Johnson County, USD 231 has had to manage the challenges of exploding enrollment numbers since the late 1990s. The district built the current high school in 2000. The building has been expanded several times since opening. Every school in the district has been built or renovated since 2000. A new bond issue was passed in January 2012 which financed the construction of new campus for a third middle school and new elementary school, upgrades to the District Activity Center, and construction of a new Multi-purpose Athletic Center on the high school campus. A $29.7 million bond issue was passed in 2016 to construct an Advanced Technical Center, addition to the high school to address enrollment growth, a TRAILS facility for adults with disabilities, and capital improvements.

Gardner-Edgerton is a fast-growing district of approximately 6,000 students in Johnson County. Approximately 175 new students arrive in Gardner each year.

== Administration ==
=== Superintendent ===
The Gardner-Edgerton Unified School District is currently under the leadership of Superintendent, Brian Huff.

=== Board of education ===
The Gardner-Edgerton Board of Education is currently under the leadership of President Tom Reddin.

=== School Resource Officers ===
The Gardner-Edgerton Unified School District contracts the Gardner Police Department for law enforcement services during school hours and after hours events. Officers are certified peace officers in the state of Kansas and serve as the school resource officers (SRO)'s for the district.

== Schools ==
As of 2011, the district comprises 1 high school, 3 middle schools, and 7 elementary schools. All but one school in the district, an elementary school, are located in Gardner, Kansas while the elementary school is located in Edgerton, Kansas.

=== High school ===
- Gardner Edgerton High School - Mascot: Trailblazers

=== Middle schools ===
- Pioneer Ridge Middle School - Mascot: Jaguars
- Wheatridge Middle School - Mascot: Mustangs
- Trail Ridge Middle School - Mascot: Huskies

=== Elementary schools ===
- Edgerton Elementary - Mascot: Cyclones
- Gardner Elementary - Mascot: Panthers
- Sunflower Elementary - Mascot: Eagles
- Moonlight Elementary - Mascot: Stars
- Madison Elementary - Mascot: Bears
- Nike Elementary - Mascot: Missiles
- Grand Star Elementary - Mascot: Timberwolves

== See also ==
- Kansas State Department of Education
- Kansas State High School Activities Association
- List of high schools in Kansas
- List of unified school districts in Kansas
