= Olathe High School =

Olathe High School may refer to Olathe North High School, which was originally Olathe High School.

Other schools in Olathe:

- Olathe East High School, West 127th Street, Olathe, Kansas
- Olathe Northwest High School, College Blvd, Olathe, Kansas
- Olathe South High School, East 151st Street, Olathe, Kansas
- Olathe West High School, West Santa Fe Street, Olathe, Kansas
