= Sunflower League =

High school activity association in Kansas

The Sunflower League is a Kansas State High School Activities Association-sponsored league primarily based in northeastern Kansas. Its members are currently 14 schools from Douglas, Johnson, and Leavenworth counties.

== Members ==
School	Nickname	Colors	Location
Gardner-Edgerton	Trailblazers	Blue & White	Gardner, Kansas
Lawrence	Lions	Red & Black	Lawrence, Kansas
Free State	Firebirds	Hunter Green & Silver	Lawrence, Kansas
Mill Valley	Jaguars	Midnight Blue & Silver	Shawnee, Kansas
Olathe East	Hawks	Orange & Navy Blue	Olathe, Kansas
Olathe North	Eagles	Red & Royal Blue	Olathe, Kansas
Olathe Northwest	Ravens	Blue & Black	Olathe, Kansas
Olathe South	Falcons	Blue & Gold	Olathe, Kansas
Olathe West	Owls	Blue & Gray	Olathe, Kansas
Shawnee Mission East	Lancers	Columbia Blue & Black	Prairie Village, Kansas
Shawnee Mission North	Bison	Cardinal Red & Black	Overland Park, Kansas
Shawnee Mission Northwest	Cougars	Orange & Black	Shawnee, Kansas
Shawnee Mission South	Raiders	Green & Gold	Overland Park, Kansas
Shawnee Mission West	Vikings	Black & Gold	Overland Park, Kansas
