= Mahe =

Mahe or MAHE may refer to:

== Places ==
=== China ===
- Mahe (麻河镇), a town in Hanchuan, Hubei
- Mahe Township (马河乡) in Li County, Gansu
- Mahe Township (马河乡) in Mudanjiang, Heilongjiang
- Mahe (马合镇), a town in Yulin, Shaanxi

=== India ===
- Mahe, India (Mayyazhi), a municipality in Mahe district and former French colony
  - Mahe railway station
- Mahe district (Mayyazhi), a census district in Puducherry, India
- Mahe Assembly constituency, a legislative assembly constituency of Mahe
- New Mahe, census town and village of Thalassery City, Kanner district, Kerala
- Mahe River, a river flowing through Kerala
- Mahe, Ladakh, India

=== Others ===
- Mähe, a subdistrict of Tallinn, Estonia
- Mahe Pasar, a village in Tabalong Regency, South Kalimantan, Indonesia
- Mahe Seberang, a village in Tabalong Regency, South Kalimantan, Indonesia
- Mahe River, a river in Liberia

== Education ==
- Manipal Academy of Higher Education, a deemed university located in Manipal, Karnataka, India
- Master of Arts in Higher Education, a student affairs-related degree
- Museu Arqueològic i d'Història d'Elx, museum in Valencia, Spain

== People ==
- Ma He (Chinese: 馬和), birth name of Zheng He (1371–1433/1435), Ming dynasty explorer

=== Given name ===
- Mahe Fonua (born 1992), Tonga international rugby league footballer
- Mahe Jabeen (born 1961), Indian writer
- Mahe Malafu (born 1998), Tongan association footballer
- Mahe Tupouniua, Tongan politician
- Mahe Vailanu (born 1997), Tongan Australian rugby union player

=== Surname ===
- Abdulkadir Aliyu Mahe (1951–2024), Nigerian politician
- Isabel Ge Mahe (born 1973/1974), Chinese businesswoman
- Lolohea Mahe (born 1982), American MMA fighter

== Species ==
- Anamixis mahe, species of crustacean
- Fremitomyces mahe, species of fungus

== Ships ==
- INS Mahe (2022)
- MV Isle of Mahe

== Other uses ==
- Mahe (apple), apple cultivar
- Mahe v Alberta, Supreme Court of Canada case
- Mahe Nao (মাহে নও), Pakistani literary magazine

== See also ==
- Mahé (disambiguation)
- Mahi (disambiguation)
- Maye (disambiguation)
