= INS Mahé =

INS Mahé or Mahe is the name of following ships if the Indian Navy, named for Mahé, India:

- INS Mahé (1983), lead Mahé-class minesweeper in commission from 1983 to 2006
- INS Mahe (2023), lead Mahe-class Anti-Submarine Warfare Shallow Water Craft, commissioned in 2025

== See also ==
- Mahé (disambiguation)
- Mahe (disambiguation)
