= Elon University =

Private university in Elon, North Carolina, US

- Former name: Elon College (1889–2001)
- Motto: Numen Lumen (Latin)
- Motto in English: "Intellectual and spiritual light"
- Type: Private university
- Established: 1889; 137 years ago
- Accreditation: SACS
- Religious affiliation: Nonsectarian, historic ties with the United Church of Christ
- Endowment: $411.5 million (2025)
- President: Connie Ledoux Book
- Provost: Rebecca Kohn
- Faculty: 447
- Students: 7,117
- Undergraduates: 6,337
- Postgraduates: 826
- Location: Elon, North Carolina, United States; 36°06′23″N 79°30′03″W
- Campus: 656 acres (265.5 ha); Midsize suburb
- Other campuses: Charlotte; Greensboro
- Newspaper: Elon News Network
- Colors: Maroon and gold
- Nickname: Phoenix
- Sporting affiliations: NCAA Division I FCS – CAA; CAA Football
- Mascot: Phoenix
- Website: elon.edu

Elon University is a private university in Elon, North Carolina, United States. Founded in 1889 as Elon College, the university is organized into six schools, most of which offer bachelor's degrees and several of which offer master's degrees or professional doctorate degrees. Located in North Carolina's Piedmont region, Elon is situated on a 656-acre (265 ha) suburban campus between the cities of Greensboro and Raleigh. Elon's athletic teams compete in NCAA Division I as members of the Coastal Athletic Association.

== History ==
Elon College was founded by the Christian Connection, which later became a part of the United Church of Christ. The charter for Elon College was issued by the North Carolina legislature in 1889. The campus was once covered with numerous large oak trees, inspiring founders to choose the word Elon, Hebrew for “oak”—as a symbolic, metaphorical name for the college. William S. Long was the first president and the original student body consisted of 76 students. In 1923, a fire destroyed most of the campus, including school records, classrooms, the library, and the chapel. The board of trustees voted to rebuild immediately. Many of the buildings that were erected in the years following the fire still stand and make up the bedrock of Elon's campus.

An institution that for many years enrolled mostly North Carolina residents, Elon began to enroll significant numbers of students from the mid-Atlantic states in the mid-1970s and began to improve its academic standards for admission. By the year 2000, about 68 percent of Elon's students came from out-of-state and were accepted only if they met high academic standards. Elon became known as a selective university and, by 2013, 82% of incoming students were from out of state. Transforming a College: The Story of a Little Known College's Strategic Climb to National Distinction (2004), an academic study by George Keller of the University of Pennsylvania, chronicles how the school changed from a regional religious college to a selective, nationally recognized university.

Elon is no longer affiliated with the United Church of Christ. Elon University's mission statement states that the school "embraces its founders' vision of an academic community that transforms mind, body, and spirit and encourages freedom of thought and liberty of conscience" and emphasizes its commitment to "nurture a rich intellectual community characterized by student engagement with a faculty dedicated to excellent teaching and scholarly accomplishment".

On October 9, 2017, the university's board of trustees elected Constance "Connie" Ledoux Book as the ninth president of the university. She became Elon's first female president on March 1, 2018.

On September 16, 2025, Elon University announced its merger with Queens University of Charlotte. Their accrediting agency, the Southern Association of Colleges and Schools Commission on Colleges (SACSCOC), approved the merger in June 2026, leaving Elon University in full control of Queens as its "sole member." From July 1, Elon began integrating certain administrative departments, with the full merger of both institutions expected to be completed in 2027–28.

== Academics ==
The university includes Elon College, the College of Arts and Sciences; the Martha and Spencer Love School of Business; the School of Communications; the Dr. Jo Watts Williams School of Education; the School of Law; and the School of Health Sciences. Master's programs are offered in business administration, business analytics, accounting, interactive media, education, physician assistant studies, and doctoral programs include physical therapy and law. Elon operates on a 4-1-4 academic calendar, including a four-week term in January known as Winter Term.

In 2009, Phi Beta Kappa society voted to establish a chapter at Elon.

Elon is accredited by the Southern Association of Colleges and Schools.

=== Elon College, the College of Arts and Sciences ===
Elon College, the College of Arts and Sciences, offers 51 undergraduate majors within three divisions: the Arts and Humanities, the Social and Behavioral Sciences, and the Natural, Mathematical and Computational Sciences. Elon College is the largest of the university's colleges.

=== Martha and Spencer Love School of Business ===
The Martha and Spencer Love School of Business offers undergraduate degrees in accounting, business administration, economics, entrepreneurship, finance, international business, management, and marketing.

=== School of Communications ===
The Elon School of Communications is one of 18 accredited communications programs for private universities in the US by the Accrediting Council for Education in Journalism and Mass Communications (ACEJMC). The program encompasses 20% of students and is divided into six main concentrations: Journalism, Strategic Communications, Cinema & Television Arts, Communication Design, Media Analytics, and Sport & Event Management.

=== School of Law ===
The Elon University School of Law opened on August 10, 2006. The school is located in downtown Greensboro, North Carolina in the former city library. Former United States Supreme Court Associate Justice Sandra Day O'Connor delivered the Dedication Address on September 19, 2006. The school houses a working court, the North Carolina Business Court.

=== School of Health Sciences ===
Established in April 2011, Elon's School of Health Sciences offers a doctor of physical therapy (DPT) program and a physician assistant (PA) studies master's program. The university also offers a Bachelor of Science in Nursing (BSN) for students. This program is offered both as a four-year BSN program for undergraduates and an accelerated BSN for those who have already earned a bachelor's degree in another field of study.

=== Dr. Jo Watts Williams School of Education ===
The Dr. Jo Watts Williams School of Education offers both licensure and non-licensure undergraduate majors, as well as Master of Education (M.Ed.) and Master of Arts in Higher Education (MHE) degrees.

== Admissions ==
For the class of 2024, the university received approximately 15,306 applications from early decision, early action, regular decision, and transfer applicants. From the application pool, around 1,587 students enrolled with an acceptance rate of 69%. The average student coming to Elon in the class of 2024 had a grade point average of 4.04, an average SAT score of 1233, and an ACT average of 27.

== Rankings and reputation ==
Academic rankings

National
- Forbes: 159
- U.S. News & World Report: 100
- Washington Monthly: 132
- WSJ/College Pulse: 143

U.S. News & World Report ranks Elon tied for #100 overall among national universities and as #1 in the country for "Best Undergraduate Teaching." Elon is ranked as the eighth most innovative national university. In 2020 Elon was the only university with top-10 rankings in all of U.S. News's "Academic Programs to Look For" categories.

== Student body ==
Elon has a student body of 6,291 undergraduate students and 826 graduate students as of 2019. Approximately 60% of students are female. Elon students come from 46 states and 49 countries; the leading suppliers of undergraduates are North Carolina, Massachusetts, Connecticut, New Jersey, New York, Virginia and Maryland.

== Athletics ==
Elon Athletics wordmark

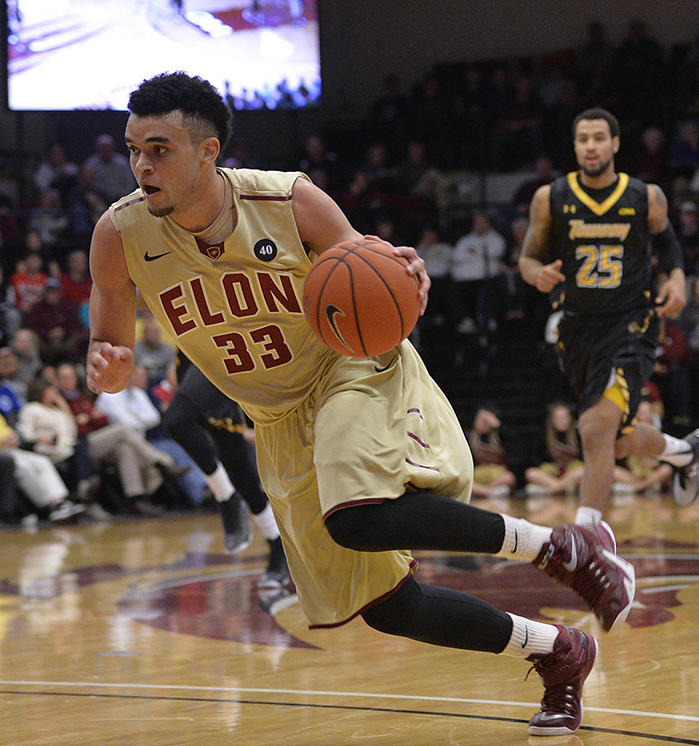
Elijah Bryant

Elon's 17 varsity sports teams, known as the Phoenix, joined the NCAA's Division I Coastal Athletic Association on July 1, 2014, after a decade in the Southern Conference. Intercollegiate sports include baseball, basketball, cross-country, football, golf, soccer, and tennis for men, and basketball, cross-country, golf, indoor track, outdoor track, soccer, softball, tennis, lacrosse, and volleyball for women. The football team competes in the Division I Football Championship Subdivision (formerly I-AA).

Campus Recreation offers intramural and club sports programs, such as baseball, cycling, lacrosse, flag football, equestrian, swimming, rugby union, triathlon, water skiing, ice hockey and Ultimate Frisbee. During Winter Term the intramurals include bowling, arena football, dodgeball, ultimate frisbee, and a monster golf tournament.

Up until 2000, the mascot of Elon was the Fighting Christian. Early Elon athletic teams were known as the "Christians" with the name "Fighting Christians" gaining popularity by 1923. The nickname was chosen due to Elon's proximity to the Wake Forest Demon Deacons, Guilford Quakers, and the Duke Blue Devils. As Elon committed itself to diversity, and the number of non-Christian students increased, the decision was made to change Elon's mascot. In 2000, a new mascot was adopted, the Phoenix. The choice came from the 1923 fire that destroyed almost the entire campus and the college's subsequent recovery.

=== Facilities ===
Elon's sports facilities include two gymnasiums, Schar Center, Walter C. Latham Baseball Park, Rhodes Stadium, Rudd Field, Hunt Softball Park, Alumni Field House, Koury Field House, Jerry and Jeanne Robertson Track and Field Complex (named in honor of humorist and speaker Jeanne Robertson who had been an Elon trustee, and her husband, "Left Brain"), six club athletic fields, Worseley Golf Center, and Koury Center, which features the 2,400 seat Alumni Gym, an aerobic fitness center, a weight room, racquetball courts, an indoor pool, and a dance studio.

The Jimmy Powell Tennis Center, a twelve-court complex, won an "Outstanding Facility Award" from the United States Tennis Association.

The 30,000-square-foot (2,800 m^{2}) facility at the north end of Rhodes Stadium in the North Athletics Complex is the headquarters for Phoenix athletics. Construction was completed on the 5,100-seat Schar Center in 2018. The Schar Center is the home to Elon's basketball and volleyball programs.

== Campus ==
Elon's historic campus is located in the Piedmont region of North Carolina, adjacent to Burlington, a city of 50,000. Elon's 656-acre (265.5 ha) campus is divided into seven major neighborhoods: Historic Campus, Central Campus, Global Neighborhood, The Oaks, The Station at Mill Point, Danieley Center, East Neighborhood, The Colonnades, and South Campus. The Elon College Historic District and Johnston Hall are listed on the National Register of Historic Places.

== Campus life ==
The university has more than 250 campus organizations and programs, including 12 national fraternities and 13 national sororities.

=== Student media ===
Student media on campus includes The Pendulum, Elon's undergraduate weekly newspaper published on Wednesdays, and WSOE, the university's student-run non-commercial campus radio station, airing since 1977. ESTV (Elon Student Television) is the Student television station featuring numerous student-created and -run programs. One of Elon Student Televisions' shows run in large part by Joey Gizzi and Steven Lannum, Elon After Hours, became AreYouKiddingTV, an internet challenge and entertainment social media account mainly popular on Tik Tok and YouTube. Additionally, ESTV produces Win Stuff, the university's first and oldest student game show. Win Stuff is currently hosted by Andrew Cox, who has been in the role since 2023.

In 2016, with advice of their faculty advisers, the two largest student media organizations on campus; Elon Local News (ELN) and The Pendulum newspaper, merged to form the new Elon News Network (ENN). ENN now operates out of the newly constructed newsroom in the McEwen Building of the School of Communications. Following a 2016 expansion of facilities, The School of Communications consists of Iris Holt McEwen Hall, the Snow Family Grand Atrium, Turner Theatre, Dwight C. Schar Hall, Steers Pavilion, and Long Hall, which houses the MA in Interactive Media graduate program and the sport management major.

=== Extra-curricular organizations ===
Numerous student government, special interest, and service organizations are represented on campus, including Elon Volunteers, Habitat for Humanity, Model UN, Epsilon Sigma Alpha, Omega Psi Phi, Alpha Phi Omega, Pi Sigma Epsilon, the Inter-Residence Council, the Elon University Student Government Association, and the Student Union Board. Cultural groups on campus include the Asian-Pacific Islander Student Association, Black Student Union, the Caribbean Student Association, Hillel, Intercultural Club, and Spectrum (Gay-Straight Alliance).

Elon is home to the Fire of the Carolinas Marching Band (FOTC). The band also includes color guard (flag spinning) and dance auxiliary squads.

=== Religious life ===
Religious groups on campus include Catholic Campus Ministry, Hillel: The Foundation for Jewish Campus Life, InterVarsity Christian Fellowship, the Iron Tree Blooming Meditation Society, the Muslim Student Association, Baptist Student Union, and Campus Outreach.

Christianity remains the most populous religious tradition at Elon, and among students that disclose their religious affiliation, Catholicism is the largest religious group on campus. The Catholic ministry on campus began in 1977 as an outreach of the Catholic Diocese of Raleigh. The Jewish population at Elon has grown especially rapidly in recent years, with twelve percent of recent classes self-identifying as Jewish. Elon was profiled in Reform Judaism magazine in 2011 as a school which has "gone the extra mile" to make itself more attractive to Jewish students, and since 2013 it has been listed as one of the "top schools Jews choose." The Muslim student population is small but has increased dramatically in size in recent years, and a Muslim Student Association formed at Elon in 2011. The Hindu population has also increased in size, Hindu festivals are now part of the university calendar, and Hindu students report feeling accepted at Elon.

Elon worked closely with the Interfaith Youth Core in developing religious diversity and interreligious dialogue. The Truitt Center for Spiritual and Religious Life, located within the Numen Lumen Pavilion of the Academic Village, serves a wide variety of purposes and all religious traditions.

=== Fraternity and sorority life ===
Elon University recognizes 26 social Greek organizations. Forty-two percent of undergraduate students belong to campus-chartered organizations.

=== Student traditions ===
At the start of each school year, Elon University holds a New Student Convocation ceremony for first year and transfer students. It is held "Under the Oaks" behind the West Dormitory. Each new student receives their own acorn at the close of the ceremony to symbolize their beginning at Elon. Upon graduation, each student receives an oak sapling, which is supposed to symbolize their growth at the university as well as the growth in their own lives. The use of the acorn and oak sapling is significant because Elon was named after the Hebrew word for "oak" (אַלוֹן, alon) because of the grove of oak trees it was founded on. The oak sapling tradition began in 1991, and the acorn tradition began in 1999 after Leo Lambert became president of the university.
