= Gizzi =

Gizzi is both a given name and surname. Notable people with the name include:

- Gizzi Erskine (born 1979), British chef
- Chris Gizzi (born 1975), American football player
- Domenico Gizzi (1680–1745), Italian singing teacher
- Dr. Evana Gizzi (born 1990), NASA Artificial Intelligence Research Lead
- Jairo Ramos Gizzi (born 1971), Italian baseball player
- Joey Gizzi (born 1995), American entertainer with "AreYouKiddingTV"
- John Gizzi (born 1955), American political journalist
- Loris Gizzi (1899–1986), Italian actor
- Michael Gizzi (1949–2010), American poet
- Peter Gizzi (born 1959), American poet
- Tom Gizzi, American football player
- Tommaso Pasquale Gizzi (1787–1849), Italian cardinal
