= Mahi (name) =

Mahi is a name of multiple origins, found in various countries.

== People with the given name Mahi ==
- Mahi Beamer (born 1928), Hawaiian singer and hula dancer
- Mahi Binebine (born 1959), Moroccan painter and novelist
- Mahi B. Chowdhury (born 1969), Bangladeshi politician
- Mahi Gill, Indian actress
- Mahi Khennane (born 1936), French-Algerian footballer
- Mahi V Raghav, Indian film producer and writer

== People with the family name Mahi ==
- Ginni Mahi (born 1999), Indian singer
- Mahiya Mahi, Bangladeshi film actress
- Yassine Mahi, 2022 Brussels stabbing suspect

== People with the nickname Mahi ==
- Mahendra Singh Dhoni, Indian cricketer known as Mahi

== See also ==
- Mahi (disambiguation)
