= Mahi =

Mahi may refer to:

== Places ==
- Mahi (village), a village in Allahabad, India
- Mahi, Iran, a village in Lorestan Province, Iran
- Mahi River, a river of western India

== People ==
- Mahi (name), list of people with this name
- Mahendra Singh Dhoni, an Indian cricketer nicknamed Mahi
- Mahi people, of Benin

== Other uses ==
- Mahi-mahi, a species of fish
- Mahi, an album by Bollywood star Aneela
- Mahi, the herbal ink used to write on Assamese sanchipat manuscripts
- Mahi Arora, a character portrayed by Kareena Kapoor in the 2012 Indian film Heroine
