= BigDaws =

American YouTube personality (born 1993

- Born: Dawson Gurley; May 19, 1993 (age 33); Olathe, Kansas, U.S.
- Occupation: YouTube personality

YouTube information
- Channels: BigDawsTv; BigDawsVlogs
- Years active: 2012–present
- Genre: Pranks
- Subscribers: 10.6 million
- Views: 2.88 billion
- Last updated: December 6, 2025

Dawson Gurley (born May 19, 1993), better known as BigDaws, is an American YouTube personality, known for the channel BigDawsTv consisting of pranks, with a second channel called BigDawsVlogs consisting of vlogs and extra footage from his main channel.

== Early life ==
Gurley was born in Olathe, Kansas and graduated from Olathe East High School. He then received an associate degree from Mesa Community College.

Gurley started making videos when he was 11 years old, inspired by Jackass: The Movie after receiving a camera as gift for Christmas from his parents. Gurley started his YouTube career in 2012, filming videos on the campus of Arizona State University. Some of his videos started going viral in 2014. Through the Golden State Warriors' championship runs of the late 2010s-early 2020s, he became prominent among the team's fanbase for bearing a striking resemblance to star player Klay Thompson. Gurley reportedly tried to use that to his advantage by gaining access to the Chase Center court prior to Game 5 of the 2022 NBA Finals, which led to the team indefinitely banning him from any event that is held at the Chase Center, Thrive City (a complex containing the Chase Center and other entertainment venues), and the Kaiser Permanente Arena, home of the Santa Cruz Warriors, the Warriors' NBA G League affiliate team.
