= George Keller (academic) =

George Keller (1928–2007) was an American scholar of higher education, Professor of Higher-Education Studies at the University of Pennsylvania Graduate School of Education, from which he retired in 1994.

== Biography ==
Born and raised in Union City, New Jersey, Keller obtained his BA and MA from Columbia University, where he served as an assistant dean and editor of the school's alumni magazine. His work covering the Columbia University protests of 1968 earned him the Atlantic Monthly’s award as Education Writer of the Year. He also received a U.S. Steel Foundation Award for distinguished service to higher education from Lyndon B. Johnson in 1965.

In 1968, Keller left Columbia after being named assistant to the chancellor of the State University of New York. In 1979, he became assistant to Dr. John S. Toll, chancellor of the University System of Maryland. He worked for a regional marketing firm before joining the faculty of the University of Pennsylvania.

Keller is best known for his book Academic strategy : the management revolution in American higher education, held in more than 1195 libraries, and which has been cited over 200 times since its publication in 1983. At the time of his death, he has completed a book Higher Education and the New Society, to be published by Johns Hopkins University Press in 2008. He was also the editor of Planning for Higher Education, the journal of the Society for College and University Planning.

== Bibliography ==
- Keller, George, ed. The Best of "Planning for higher education." Ann Arbor, MI : Society for College and University Planning, c1997.ISBN 0960160868
- Keller, George, Academic strategy : the management revolution in American higher education : Baltimore, Md. : Johns Hopkins University Press, 1983. ISBN 0-8018-3029-X
  - Review, Higher Education Volume 13, Number 2 / April, 1984
- Keller, George, O'Brien, Dennis, and Rudolph, Susanne Hoeber . Changes in the context for creating knowledge New York, N.Y. : American Council of Learned Societies, 1994. OCoLC 31593898
- Keller, George, Prologue to prominence : a half century at Roanoke College, 1951-2003 Minneapolis, MN : Lutheran University Press, c2005. ISBN 1-932688-12-9
- Keller, George. Transforming a college : the story of a little-known college's strategic climb to national distinction Baltimore : Johns Hopkins University Press, 2004. ISBN 0-8018-7989-2 (about Elon University)
  - Review, The Review of Higher Education - Volume 28, Number 4, Summer 2005, pp. 637–638
