= Martha and Spencer Love School of Business =

Business school of Elon University

Coordinates: 36°06′24″N 79°30′06″W

- Type: Private
- Established: 1985; 41 years ago
- Parent institution: Elon University
- Dean: Raghu Tadepalli
- Undergraduates: 1,916
- Postgraduates: 136
- Location: Elon, North Carolina, United States
- Campus: Suburban 656 acres (265.5 ha)
- Website: www.elon.edu/business

The Martha and Spencer Love School of Business is part of Elon University in Elon, North Carolina. The undergraduate school offers degrees in Bachelor of Science in Accounting, the Bachelor of Science in Business Administration, and the Bachelor of Arts in Economics. Minors are also offered in Accounting, Business Administration and Economics. The school offers concentrations in Entrepreneurship, Healthcare Administration, Business Analytics, Human Resources, International Business, Leadership/Management, Marketing, and Supply Chain Management. The graduate school offers a Master of Business Administration.

== History ==
The Martha and Spencer Love School of Business was established in 1985 following an endowment gift from The Martha and Spencer Love Foundation. The Love School of Business is based in Ernest A. Koury, Sr. Business Center, which opened in 2006. Richard W. Sankey Hall, an expansion of the Love School of Business, opened in fall 2018.

The Martha and Spencer Love School of Business earned initial accreditation by AACSB in 2004.

== Academics ==
Graduate Programs

- Master of Business Administration
- Master of Science in Business Analytics
- Master of Science in Accounting

Undergraduate Majors

- Accounting
- Business Analytics
- Economic Consulting
- Economics
- Entrepreneurship
- Finance
- Human resource Management
- International Business
- Marketing
- Project Management
- Supply Chain Management

Undergraduate Minors

- Accounting
- Business Administration
- Economics
- Entrepreneurship
- Finance
- Professional Sales
- Supply Chain Management

Undergraduate Centers & Programs

- Business Fellows Program
- Chandler Family Professional Sales Center
- Doherty Center for Creativity, Innovation & Entrepreneurship
- William Gerrard Reed Finance Center
- Center for Financial Literacy
- Center for Organizational Analytics
- Porter Family Professional Development Center
- Innovation Scholars
- International Business Dual Degree Program
- Accelerated 3+1 Dual Degree Program
- Underrepresented Business Student Alliance Network
- PRME: Principles for Responsible Management and Education

== Student organizations ==
- Alpha Kappa Psi
- American Marketing Association
- Beta Alpha Psi
- Beta Gamma Sigma
- Delta Sigma Pi
- Economics Club
- Elon Blockchain
- Elon Consulting Club
- Elon Microfinance Initiative
- Omicron Delta Epsilon International Economics Honor Society
- Financial Management Association International
- Net Impact
- Project Management Club
- Real Estate Club
- Sigma Iota Epsilon
- Society for Human Resource Management
- Women in Finance
- Women in Sales

== Recognition and rankings ==
- The Elon MBA is ranked among the Top 100 schools in the U.S. News & World Report's “Best Part-time MBA Programs” list for 2022.
- The Princeton Review named Elon MBA as one of the country’s best on-campus MBA programs in its “Best Business Schools for 2021” guide of top graduate business programs.
- In 2021, Elon’s undergraduate business program ranks No. 45 in the survey by Poets & Quants, a ranking that includes private and public institutions of all sizes. Among private colleges and universities, Elon’s program ranked No. 23.
- In 2014, Princeton Review's Best 301 Business Schools ranked Martha and Spencer Love School of Business 2nd in the United States for Best Administered MBA Program.
- In 2013, BusinessWeek evaluated graduate business schools across the nation and, in the category of part-time MBA programs, the Martha and Spencer Love School of Business was ranked 1st in North Carolina, 1st in the Southeast, and 5th in the United States.

== See also ==
- List of business schools in the United States
