= Johnston Hall (Elon College, North Carolina) =

- U.S. National Register of Historic Places
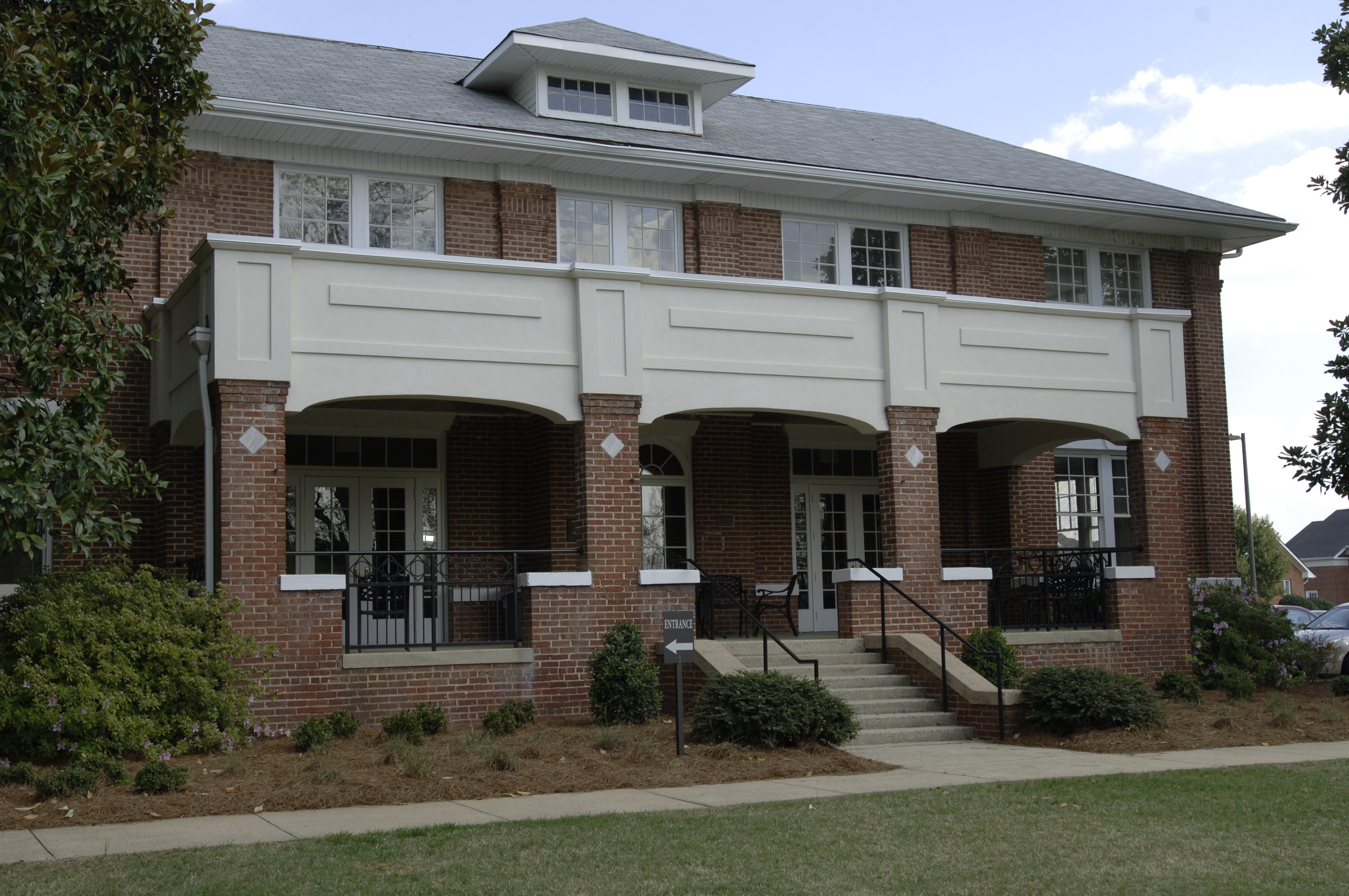
- Johnston Hall, April 2006

- Location within North Carolina Location within the United States
- Location: 103 Antioch St., Elon, North Carolina
- Coordinates: 36°6′1″N 79°30′1″W
- Built: 1925
- Architect: Wood, John H.
- Architectural style: Classical Revival
- NRHP reference No.: 94000130
- Added to NRHP: March 07, 1994

Johnston Hall is a historic building located on the campus of Elon University in Elon, Alamance County, North Carolina. It was built in 1925, and is a substantial, two-story, H-shaped, red brick Classical Revival-style building. The front facade features a one-story flat-roof porch carried by brick piers. The building is the historical centerpiece of the Elon Homes for Children campus, an orphanage founded in 1907. The building is named for Charles David Johnston, superintendent of the orphanage.

The building was acquired by Elon University in 2003. It now serves as the headquarters for Elon University's Office of University Advancement.

It was added to the National Register of Historic Places in 1994.
