= AreYouKiddingTV =

American entertainment social media channel

- Born: Joey Gizzi; December 4, 1995 (age 30); Steven Lannum; April 6, 1996 (age 30)
- Occupations: YouTube and Tik Tok personalities

YouTube information
- Channel: AreYouKiddingTV
- Years active: 2016–present
- Genres: Internet challenge; Entertainment
- Subscribers: 3.9 million
- Views: 2.3 billion
- Last updated: July 9, 2026
- Website: areyoukiddingshop.com

AreYouKiddingTV is a social media channel mainly popular on TikTok and YouTube, run by the internet personalities Joey Gizzi and Steven Lannum. Their content normally follows a similar format involving Gizzi having a piece of paper with a challenge on it taped to his chest, while Lannum holds out money in his hand, both without talking. If a passerby can understand and complete the challenge first, they receive the money. Challenges often take place on university campuses, especially their former school Elon University, and require multiple steps or are cryptic in some nature. Since the COVID-19 lockdowns, their content was revised to its current form and has become more popular, resulting in collaborations with organizations and other content creators including MrBeast and Trevor Wallace.

== Internet career ==
External video
- TAKE THE DOLLAR (Social Experiment); The first mute sign challenge video released by Gizzi and Lannum, released on March 3, 2018.

The creators of the channel, Joey Gizzi and Steven Lannum, met in 2014 as freshmen students in the Communications Fellows program at Elon University in Elon, North Carolina. The two bonded quickly over a shared history in video production and running an individual YouTube channel. A "similar sense of humor and similar goals with our majors", was also cited by the duo as a reason for their quick friendship, according to a 2023 interview. The duo first helped direct, write, and film segments for the Elon Student Television (ESTV) show "Elon After Hours," where they played traditional pranks and performed social experiments on campus. This show became popular on campus, and, wanting to expand upon its success, Gizzi and Lannum created their YouTube channel "AreYouKidding" in 2016. The channel's content largely replicated that of the former show, while also taking inspiration from established YouTube pranksters BigDawsTV and ThatWasEpic. During this time, the two also created their first mute sign challenge video, with the sign taped to Gizzi reading simply "take the dollar", which Lannum held out, to see the campus' reaction as a social experiment.

Despite the channel amassing over 20,000 subscribers in this time, the two abandoned the channel after graduating in 2018, as it was still regarded as only a "hobby" according to Gizzi. As Lannum additionally moved to Boston, the channel remained inactive for two years, with Gizzi recording wedding films and music videos, and Lannum going into marketing. In 2020 however, during the COVID-19 lockdowns and the subsequent rise in the popularity of the short-form media platform TikTok, the two decided to edit and repost their old videos on the new platform, where a few previously-recorded videos became popular. The lack of old content to repost eventually led to the duo reuniting to meet the new demand, rebranding the channel name to "AreYouKiddingTV".

After rejoining, the "engaging, […] simple, [and] entertaining" concept behind their sign challenges, along with more consistent uploads, caused the channel to rise in popularity, according to the duo. This popularity and likewise increase in funding has allowed the two to work more with large sponsors, including Brooks Brothers, Dr Pepper, Paramount Pictures, and United Airlines. The duo has also collaborated with fellow YouTuber and philanthropist MrBeast, YouTuber and comedian Trevor Wallace, actor and comedian Craig Robinson and singer and songwriter Ed Sheeran. While the two have stated they still prefer to film videos at Elon University, greater funds have allowed them to travel to other locations to film: including the cities of Austin and Los Angeles nationally, and Amsterdam, London, and Paris internationally. This has allowed the stakes and awards featured in the challenges to become higher, as seen in one challenge at East Carolina University, where over a hundred students participated to be the first person in a bathing suit to find a clear key in a pool, for the prize of US$5,000.

The challenges themselves are formulated between the duo in their free time, and in the case of a sponsorship, with their management. They've stated the goal of the challenges is to make them "not always too hectic or frantic, [but not] too laid back" or "repetitive" either. The duo have further stated their goal is to eventually spread to more platforms, potentially including television, create more products, and to attend and host more events and interactive shows. To help achieve this, the duo, along with Gizzi's cousin Derek, have begun to work full-time on the channel as of 2023, as opposed to also working day jobs, which the duo confirmed they still did as recently as July 2022.

== Personal life ==
Aside from both going to Elon University, both also went to Los Angeles for a time as part of the "Elon in L.A. program", which gave insight to future careers, in this case entertainment, in the city. Lannum also studied abroad in France his senior year. The duo both currently live in Nashville, Tennessee.
