= Olathe USD 233 =

School district in Olathe, Kansas

Address
- 14160 Black Bob Rd. Olathe, Kansas, 66063; United States
- Coordinates: 38°52′15″N 94°45′43″W

District information
- Type: Public
- Grades: PreK to 12
- Established: 1965
- Superintendent: Brent Yeager (2024)
- School board: 7 members
- Schools: 51

Students and staff
- Students: 29,794 (2021)

Other information
- Website: olatheschools.org

Olathe USD 233, also known as Olathe Public Schools, is a public unified school district headquartered in Olathe, Kansas, United States. It is one of the major school districts in the Kansas City Metropolitan Area and is one of the larger school districts in the state of Kansas. There are about 30,000 students enrolled in the district, which as of 2018 operated 5 high schools, 10 middle schools, and 35 elementary schools (one planned to open in 2019), as well as additional educational and support facilities.

Portions of the city of Olathe make up 66% of the district's territory. Areas of Lenexa make up 19%, sections of Overland Park make up 8%, and portions of Shawnee make up less than 1%. Unincorporated areas make up about 6% of the territory.

== History ==
The district was created in 1965 from the consolidation of the Countryside School District 103 (a large portion), Meadowlane School District 108, Mount Zion School District 105, Olathe School District 16, and Pleasant View School District 96. Wayne Fick became the first superintendent of the newly unified district. At the time of its creation, there were 3687 students attending a single high school, junior high school, and 5 elementary schools.

M.L. Winters was named superintendent in 1968, and served in that role for 23 years until 1991 - the longest tenure of any superintendent in Olathe history. During that time, district enrollment increased from 4433 to 15,357 students, and 22 new facilities were constructed or rebuilt. The district continued to grow at a rapid pace under the leadership of superintendents Ron Wimmer (1991–2005) and Patricia All (2005–2010, 2016–17), Marlin Berry (2010–2016), and John Allison (2017–2021). In 2010, the district recorded an official enrollment of 27,999, becoming the second largest school district in Kansas.

Beginning in 2009, the district launched a new K-5, 6–8, 9-12 grade configuration. Prior to this time, students in grades 10-12 were assigned to high schools, grades 7–9 to junior high schools, and grades K-6 in elementary schools. As part of this transition, all junior highs were rebranded as middle schools. The transition to this new configuration was completed in 2011. In August 2014, it was announced that construction would begin on Olathe's fifth high school, Olathe West High School and in 2018, the 36th elementary school was announced, named Canyon Creek Elementary School.

The iconic "Blue Backpack Kid" student resource website was first introduced in 2004, and remained largely unchanged until the 2012 redesign which features a gray and beige color scheme with a slideshow that features various students and events.

== Demographics ==
As of September 2016, there were 29,622 students enrolled in the school district, which is operated by 4,442 staff/faculty. The vast majority (83.2%) of students are drawn from Olathe, Kansas with the remainder of students living in the neighboring cities of Overland Park (10.1%), Lenexa (5.9%), Shawnee (0.1%), unincorporated areas of Johnson County, Kansas (0.3%), or outside the district (0.4%). The general population of the district boundaries is 158,000, with a median age of 33.2 years old.

The district has a high school graduation rate of 92.9%, with average class sizes as follows:

- Elementary Schools: 20.5
- Middle Schools: 22.0
- High Schools: 25.5

Racially/ethnically, the student body is predominantly (69.1%) White/Caucasian. The largest minority groups are Hispanic/Latino (15.0%), Black/African American (7.0%), and Asian (4.3%).

== Leadership ==
In 2021, Brent Yeager was appointed as district superintendent.

The Olathe Board of Education is composed of seven members.

== Facilities ==
High Schools
Name	Date Opened	Enrollment (As of 2020)
Olathe East High School	1992	1948
Olathe North High School	1958	2126
Olathe Northwest High School	2003	1849
Olathe South High School	1981	1928
Olathe West High School	2017	1634

Middle Schools
Name	Date Opened	Enrollment (As of 2020)
California Trail Middle School	1996	662
Chisholm Trail Middle School	2000	706
Frontier Trail Middle School	1989	715
Indian Trail Middle School	1981	665
Mission Trail Middle School	2010	728
Oregon Trail Middle School	1976	679
Pioneer Trail Middle School	1986	674
Prairie Trail Middle School	2004	671
Santa Fe Trail Middle School	1968	691
Summit Trail Middle School	2018	614

Elementary Schools
Name	Date Opened	Enrollment (As of 2020)
Arbor Creek Elementary School	2002	375
Bentwood Elementary School	1996	301
Black Bob Elementary School	1978	282
Briarwood Elementary School	1988	327
Brougham Elementary School	1985	270
Canyon Creek Elementary School	2019	334
Cedar Creek Elementary School	1997	387
Central Elementary School	1952 (originally opened in 1882)	227
Clearwater Creek Elementary School	2004	504
Countryside Elementary School	1988	322
Fairview Elementary School	1964	204
Forest View Elementary School	2009	468
Green Springs Elementary School	1991	262
Havencroft Elementary School	1972	261
Heatherstone Elementary School	1995	392
Heritage Elementary School	1988	330
Indian Creek Elementary School	1985	352
Madison Place Elementary School	2007	377
Mahaffie Elementary School	1991	376
Manchester Park Elementary School	2004	613
Meadow Lane Elementary School	1953	399
Millbrooke Elementary School	2014	383
Northview Elementary School	1967	246
Pleasant Ridge Elementary School	1991	263
Prairie Center Elementary School	1980	369
Ravenwood Elementary School	2005	442
Regency Place Elementary School	1999	376
Ridgeview Elementary School	1956	182
Rolling Ridge Elementary School	1972	553
Scarborough Elementary School	1977	311
Sunnyside Elementary School	2000	314
Tomahawk Elementary School	1980	265
Walnut Grove Elementary School	1985	347
Washington Elementary School	1975 (originally opened in 1889)	390
Westview Elementary School	1954	Closed 2025
Woodland Elementary School	2008	306

Specialty Schools
Name	Role/Purpose	Date Opened
Harmony Early Childhood Center	Preschool	2006
Heartland Early Childhood Center (originally Heartland Developmental Learning Center)	Preschool	1976
Johnson County Juvenile Hall Educational Program	Juvenile Detention	—N/a
Olathe Advanced Technical Center	Vocational school	—N/a
Prairie Learning Center		2007

Other Facilities
Name	Role/Purpose	Date Opened
College Boulevard Activity Center	Student Athletics	2003
District Education Center		1996
Food Production Center		1990
Instructional Resource Center		1989
Lone Elm Service Center		2004
North Lindenwood Support Center		1987
Olathe District Activity Center	Student Athletics	1991
Operations Service Center		1985
Technology Support Center	I.T. Support	2014
West Dennis Support Center		1983 (originally opened in 1966)

== See also ==
- Kansas State Department of Education
- Kansas State High School Activities Association
- List of high schools in Kansas
- List of unified school districts in Kansas
