= Elon College Historic District =

Historic district in North Carolina, United States

- U.S. National Register of Historic Places
- U.S. Historic district
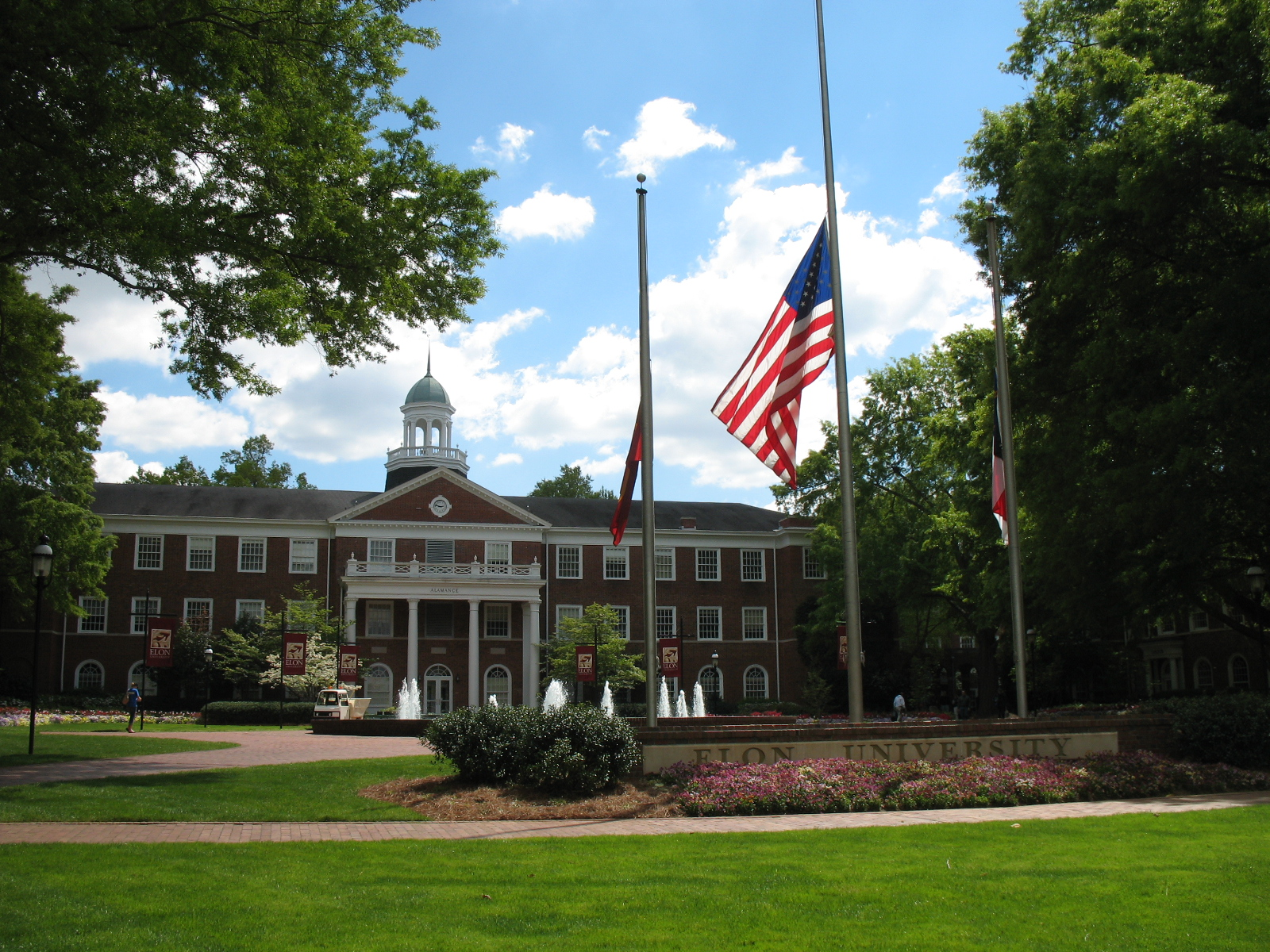
- Alamance Building, Elon University, April 2007

- Location within North Carolina Location within the United States
- Location: S side of Haggard Ave. between William and O'Kelly, Elon, North Carolina
- Coordinates: 36°6′7″N 79°30′17″W
- Area: 9 acres (3.6 ha)
- Built: 1907, 1923-1927
- Architect: Hunter, Herbert B.; Stout, Joe W.
- Architectural style: Colonial Revival, Georgian Revival
- NRHP reference No.: 88000166
- Added to NRHP: March 22, 1988

Elon College Historic District is a national historic district located on the campus of Elon University at Elon, Alamance County, North Carolina. It encompasses 6 contributing buildings and 1 contributing object that form the historic core of the Elon College campus. They are the West Dormitory (1907), and five buildings built between 1923–1927 which form an H-shaped complex: Alamance Building, Whitley Auditorium, Carlton Library, Duke Science Building, and Mooney Building. The object is a monument erected in 1929. All of the buildings are three-story red brick buildings of Colonial Revival / Georgian Revival design.

It was added to the National Register of Historic Places in 1988.
