= Mahi, Prayagraj =

Village in Uttar Pradesh, India

Coordinates: 30°57′N 77°07′E

Mahi is a village in Prayagraj, Uttar Pradesh, India.
