= Abdulkadir Aliyu Mahe =

Nigerian politician (1951–2024)

Chief of Staff
- In office 4 September 2023 – 28 December 2024

SSG to Kwara State

Personal details
- Born: 1951
- Died: 28 December 2024 (aged 72–73) Ilorin, Kwara State, Nigeria

Prince Abdulkadir Aliyu Mahe (1951 – 28 December 2024) was a Nigerian politician and the State Secretary to the Government of Kwara state and the chief of staff to executive governor of Kwara state Mallam AbdulRahman AbdulRazaq until his death.

== Life and career ==
Mahe was born in 1951 in Ilorin, Ilorin South Local Government Area of Kwara State, Nigeria. He studied Business Administration at the University of Calabar, where he obtained his master's degree. Additionally, he earned an Ordinary National Diploma and a Higher National Diploma in Marketing from Kaduna Polytechnic and Kwara State Polytechnic, respectively.

In September 2023, Mahe was appointed the State Secretary to the Government of Kwara State, a position he held prior to his appointment as Chief of Staff to the Executive Governor of Kwara State, Mallam AbdulRahman AbdulRazaq. Mahe, a retired permanent secretary, also served as the former Clerk at the Kwara State House of Assembly.

Mahe died on 28 December 2024.
