= Mahé (disambiguation) =

Mahé is the main island of the Republic of Seychelles.

Mahé may also refer to:

== Places ==
=== Seychelles ===
- Mahé Airport
- Grand'Anse Mahé, an administrative district

=== India ===
- Mahé, India
- Mahe district
- Mahé Municipality
- Mahé River

=== Other ===
- Pont-Mahé Bay, France

== People ==
- Bertrand-François Mahé de La Bourdonnais (1699−1753), French naval officer
- Louis-Charles Mahé de La Bourdonnais
- Mahé Drysdale (born 1978), New Zealand sculler
- Mahé (pornographic actress) (born 1984), French pornographic actress

== Other uses ==
- Mahé boulder cricket (Phalangacris alluaudi), species of cricket endemic to the Seychelles
- Mahé day gecko (Phelsuma sundbergi longinsulae), species of lizard endemic to the Seychelles
- INS Mahé (1983)
- Battle of Mahé
- Mahé-class minesweeper

== See also ==
- Mahe (disambiguation)
- Malé, capital of Maldives
- The Mahé Circle, novel by Georges Simenon
