= Olathe West High School =

Location
- 2200 W. Santa Fe; Olathe, Kansas 66061; 38.8851°N 94.8546°W

Information
- School type: Public, High School
- Opened: Fall 2017
- School district: Olathe USD 233
- CEEB code: 170010
- Principal: Jay Novacek
- Teaching staff: 106.10 (FTE)
- Grades: 9 to 12
- Enrollment: 1,601 (2023-2024)
- Student to teacher ratio: 15.09
- Campus type: Suburban
- Colors: Royal Blue, Silver and Navy
- Athletics conference: Sunflower League
- Mascot: Owen the Owl
- Newspaper: The Owl Post
- Feeder schools: Mission Trail Middle School, Oregon Trail Middle School
- Website: School Website

Olathe West High School is a public high school located in Olathe, Kansas, United States, serving students in grades 9–12. The school is one of five high schools in the Olathe USD 233 school district. The school colors are royal blue, silver, and navy, and the school mascot is the Owl.

== History ==
Olathe West was established in 2017 to help educate the rapidly increasing population of Olathe. Being the fifth high school within the Olathe School District, it was designed using architecturally advanced techniques to create an innovative and futuristic learning environment for its students.

== Extracurricular activities ==
Olathe West is a member of the Kansas State High School Activities Association and offers a variety of sports programs. Extracurricular activities are also offered in the form of performing arts, school publications, and clubs.

=== Athletics ===
==== Soccer, Boys ====
One of the most successful athletic programs offered at Olathe West is soccer. In their third season, the boys' soccer team won the Kansas state championship on Saturday, November 9, 2019, against Blue Valley West with a score of 2–1. The first goal was scored by junior Henry Curnow and the second by senior Jony Munoz.

==== Bowling ====
Won their first ever individual state title in bowling with Michael Anderson in 2019.

==== Wrestling ====
Freshman Makayla Rivera, at the 235-pound weight, placed second in state in 2019.

==== List of all athletic programs ====
- Baseball
- Basketball, Boys
- Basketball, Girls
- Cross Country
- Football
- Golf, Boys
- Golf, Girls
- Gymnastics
- Soccer, Girls
- Softball
- Swimming and Diving
- Tennis, Boys
- Tennis, Girls
- Track and Field
- Volleyball

=== State championships ===
State Championships
Season	Sport	Number of Championships	Year
Fall	Cross Country, Girls	5	2020, 2021, 2022, 2023, 2024
Fall	Soccer, Boys	2	2019, 2021
Spring	Softball	1	2023
Spring	Track and Field, Boys	1	2025
Spring	Track and Field, Girls	1	2023
Spring	Golf Boys	1	2024
Total		11	

== See also ==
- List of high schools in Kansas
- List of unified school districts in Kansas

Other high schools in Olathe USD 233 school district

- Olathe East High School in Olathe
- Olathe North High School in Olathe
- Olathe Northwest High School in Olathe
- Olathe South High School in Olathe
