= Olathe North High School =

Location
- 600 East Prairie Road; Olathe, Kansas 66061; United States; 38.8882°N 94.8086°W

Information
- School type: Public, High School
- Established: 1883, 1958 (current location)
- School board: Board Website
- School district: Olathe USD 233
- CEEB code: 172220
- Principal: Jason Herman
- Teaching staff: 137.00 (FTE)
- Grades: 9 to 12
- Enrollment: 2,036 (2023-2024)
- Student to teacher ratio: 14.86
- Campus type: Suburban
- Colors: Royal blue and Red
- Athletics conference: Sunflower League
- Mascot: Eagle
- Website: School Website

Olathe North High School is a public high school located in Olathe, Kansas, United States, serving students in grades 9–12. The school is one of five high schools in the Olathe USD 233 school district. The school colors are red and royal blue and the mascot is the Eagle.

Olathe North is a member of the Kansas State High School Activities Association and offers a variety of sports programs. Athletic teams compete in the 6A division and are known as the "Eagles". Extracurricular activities are also offered in the form of performing arts, school publications, and clubs.

== History ==
Olathe North is the oldest of five high schools in Olathe, Kansas. The school was founded in 1883 as Olathe High School.

The school moved to its current location in 1958 and changed its name to Olathe North Sr. High School in 1981. The mascot, school colors, and fight song of Olathe High were retained for Olathe North.

== Programs and education ==
Olathe North hosts five different 21st century academies. These are programs developed by the Olathe School District to give students the ability to develop specific skills and interests. The five programs Olathe North hosts are Animal Health, Geoscience, Medical Professions, Sports Medicine, and Distinguished Scholars. This includes Distinguished Scholars Science, Math, Language Arts, Political Science, and Visual Arts.

== Extracurricular activities ==
The Eagles compete in the Sunflower League and are classified as a 6A school, the largest classification in Kansas according to the Kansas State High School Activities Association. Throughout its history, Olathe North has won thirteen state championships in various sports.

=== Athletics ===
==== Football ====
Olathe North has won eight Kansas 6A State Championships (1996, 1997, 1998, 2000, 2001, 2002, 2003 and 2009) in football under the coaching of Gene Weir, John McCall and Pete Flood.The 2009 Eagles won the 6A state championship on Saturday, November 28, 2009, vs. Wichita Heights. November 27, 2010, Olathe North played Wichita Heights at State losing.

=== State championships ===
State Championships
Season	Sport	Number of Championships	Year
Fall	Football	8	1996, 1997, 1998, 2000, 2001, 2002, 2003, 2009
Fall	Soccer, Boys	1	1988
Fall	Cross Country, Boys	3	2015, 2017, 2018
Fall	Gymnastics, Girls	3	2021, 2022, 2023
Winter	Bowling, Boys	2	2012, 2013
Winter	Bowling, Girls	1	2014
Winter	Scholars Bowl	1	2019
Winter	Wrestling, Boys	1	2018
Spring	Baseball	1	1989
Spring	Softball	2	1984, 1989
Spring	Track & Field, Boys	3	2005, 2022, 2023
Spring	Track & Field, Girls	1	2021
Total		27	

=== Non-athletic activities ===
==== Band ====
In October 2011, the Screamin' Eagles won the title of overall "Grand Champion" at the Missouri Western Marching Competition for the third year in a row. At the 2011 Heart of America Marching Festival, the band won "Grand Champion" status for the second year in a row, as well as Outstanding Music, Marching, and General Effect awards. The Screamin' Eagles won the "Grand Champion" at the Kansas band masters association in October 2015.. In 2017, the Screamin' Eagles went to New York City to perform at Carnegie Hall.

== Notable alumni ==
- Arland Bruce III, former NFL and CFL player
- Dick Hickock, executed murderer, made famous in Truman Capote's book In Cold Blood
- Storey Jackson, linebacker for the Cleveland Browns
- Jacob Parrish, college football cornerback for the Kansas State Wildcats
- Kit Pellow, former professional baseball player for the Saltillo Saraperos of the Mexican League, and for the Yaquis de Ciudad Obregón in the Pacific Mexican League, former Kansas City Royals player
- Isaiah Simmons, linebacker for the New York Giants
- Marcel Spears Jr., linebacker for the Iowa State Cyclones and Cincinnati Bengals
- Darren Sproles, former running back and kick/punt returner for the Philadelphia Eagles, former Kansas State All-American running back

== See also ==
- List of high schools in Kansas
- List of unified school districts in Kansas

Other high schools in Olathe USD 233 school district

- Olathe East High School in Olathe
- Olathe Northwest High School in Olathe
- Olathe South High School in Olathe
- Olathe West High School in Olathe
