= Olathe Northwest High School =

Location
- 21300 College Blvd. Olathe, Kansas 66061; United States; 38°55′45″N 94°49′57″W

Information
- School type: Public, High School
- Established: 2003
- School board: Board Website
- School district: Olathe USD 233
- CEEB code: 172225
- Principal: Chris Zuck
- Teaching staff: 118.40 (FTE)
- Grades: 9 to 12
- Enrollment: 1,966 (2023-24)
- Student to teacher ratio: 16.60
- Campus: Suburban
- Colors: Blue, black, and white
- Athletics conference: Sunflower League
- Mascot: Raven
- Rival: Olathe North High School; Olathe West High School
- Website: School Website

Olathe Northwest High School is a public high school located in Olathe, Kansas, United States, serving students in grades 9–12. The school is one of five high schools in the Olathe USD 233 school district. The school colors are blue, black, and white, and the school mascot is the Raven. Olathe Northwest was established in 2003 to help educate the rapidly increasing population of Olathe. Olathe Northwest is a member of the Kansas State High School Activities Association and offers a variety of sports programs. Athletic teams compete in the 6A division and are known as the "Ravens". Extracurricular activities are also offered in the form of performing arts, school publications, and clubs.

== History ==
Olathe Northwest High School was established in 2003 and celebrated its 10th school year with a homecoming event on September 21, 2013.

== Academics ==
Olathe Northwest achieved the Kansas State Department of Education "Standard of Excellence" for the 2011–12 school year.

== Extracurricular activities ==
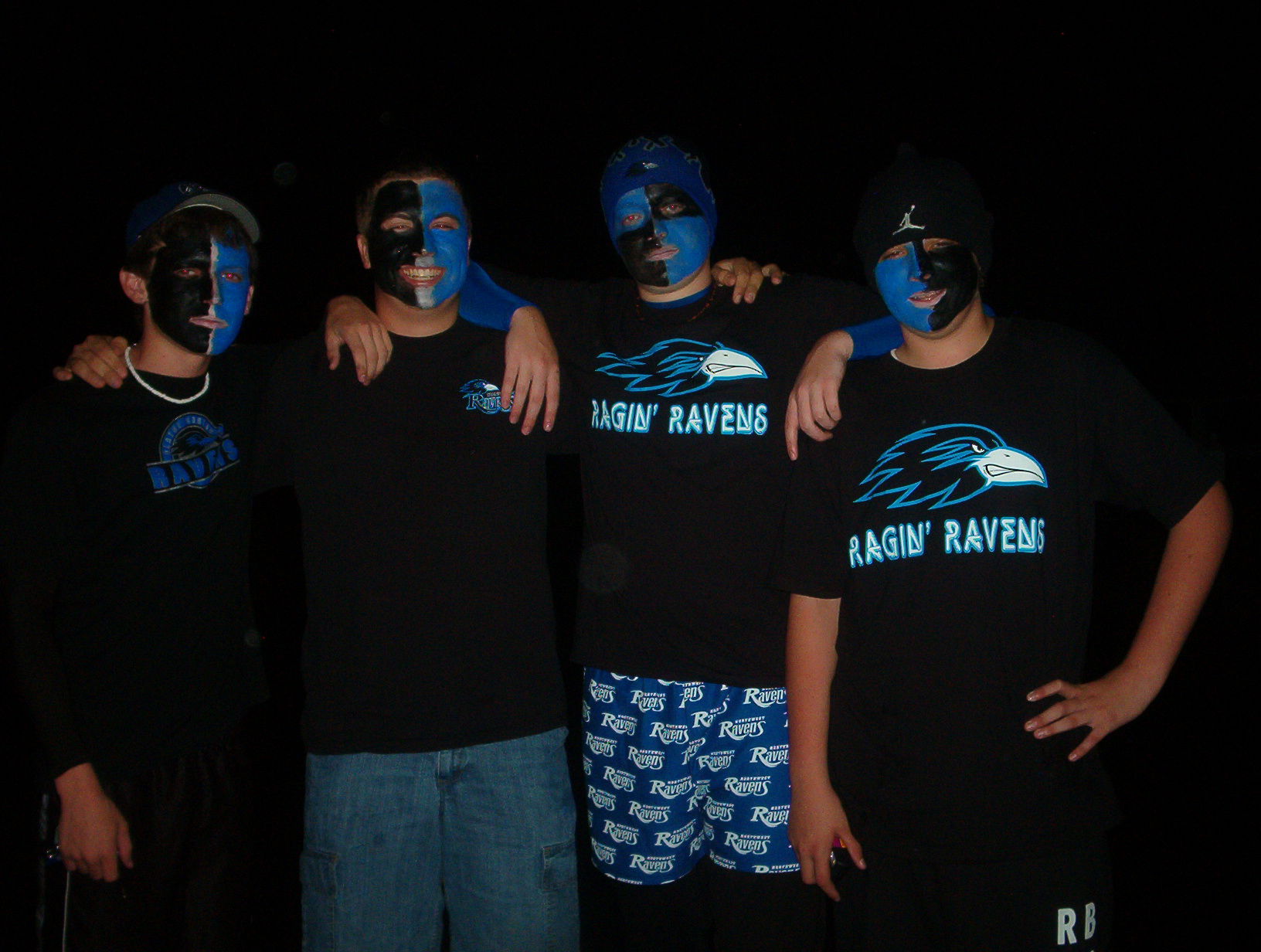
Olathe Northwest students showing their spirit

The Ravens compete in the Sunflower League and are classified as a 6A school, the largest classification in Kansas according to the Kansas State High School Activities Association. A few graduates have gone on to participate in Division I, Division II, and Division III athletics. Northwest has obtained 13 State championships in various sports.

=== Athletics ===
==== Baseball ====
In 2007, the ONW baseball team became co-Sunflower League champions for the first time in school history. The team finished with a record of 12–8. The squad reached the Regional Championship game in 2004 and 2005 but fell one game short of the state tournament each time. In the 2003–04 season, the Ravens entered into regional play as the bottom seed and drew Mill Valley High School, the No. 1 team in 5A. The Ravens defeated Mill Valley in one of the biggest upsets in Kansas high school baseball history.

==== Bowling ====
The 2014–15 and 2016–17 bowling men's varsity team won the city competition, beating cross-town rivals Olathe North.

==== Boys' basketball ====
In 2017, the Raven boys' basketball team qualified for the state tournament for the first time in school history.

==== Football ====
In 2004, the first year of varsity play, the ONW football team went 2–7. The following year, they improved to 4–5. The 2006 squad finished 3–7 and made the playoffs for the first time in school history. The 2014 team had the program's first winning record and beat cross-town rival Olathe East for the first time in school history.

In 2022, under first-year head coach Lorne Clark, the Ravens won their first regional championship in program history over Olathe South. They went on to win the sectional championship against Olathe West and secured a program-record seven-game winning streak.

The 2025 squad would make more history after winning another regional and sectional title, then went on to win the Class 6A East Sub-State Championship against Gardner-Edgerton to earn a trip to the State Championship game for the first time in its 22-year history, while reaching a team-high nine wins in a single season.

==== Girls' basketball ====
The Lady Ravens broke a couple of records in their 2015 season, but they did not enjoy the way it ended with a 51–45 loss to Blue Valley in sub state, finishing with a 9–12 record. Their records include most three-pointers made in state, with seventeen, and most three-pointers attempted, with forty-three.

==== Softball ====
In 2009, the Lady Ravens girls' softball team compiled a perfect 25–0 regular season record. The team continued on to win the 2009 Kansas State High School Championship title against Washburn Rural High School. In May 2011, entering the postseason as the number 6 seed in 6A, the Ravens captured their second title, beating Washburn Rural 9–1. In 2017, the Lady Ravens won their third state championship.

==== Tennis ====
In 2006, sophomore J.T. Christian won the 6A State Championship in boys singles. After graduating from ONW, Christian played tennis at Marquette University and Creighton University.

==== Wrestling ====
The 2014–15 ONW wrestling team placed 12th in the state – their best finish to date. Six wrestlers from the 2014–2015 squad qualified for state, three of whom placed.

==== Volleyball ====
In 2010, the girls' varsity team went 11–0 in the Sunflower League and claimed the first league championship in team history.

The Lady Ravens won back-to-back state championships in 2016 and 2017.

=== State championships ===
State Championships
Season	Sport/Activity	Number of Championships	Year
Fall	Debate	1	2007
Fall	Volleyball	2	2016, 2017
Fall	Gymnastics	1	2017
Fall	Dance	2	2020, 2023
Fall	Golf, Girls	2	2022, 2023
Fall	Tennis, Girls	2	2024, 2025
Winter	Scholar's Bowl	1	2018
Spring	Softball	4	2009, 2011, 2017, 2024
Spring	Track and Field, Girls	2	2022, 2024
Total		17	

=== Non-athletic programs ===
==== Debate and forensics ====
In 2007, the team of Alex Parkinson and Jesi Egan won the two-speaker state championship in policy debate. Parkinson and Egan also won back-to-back Debate Coaches Invitational titles in 2006 and 2007. Parkinson went on to debate at Harvard, where he earned numerous honors, including second speaker at the National Debate Tournament in 2011.

At the 2014 NSDA National Tournament, senior Alaina Walberg was named the Phyllis Flory Barton Top Speaker in policy debate.

As of May 14, 2018, Olathe Northwest is ranked third in Kansas and 27th in the nation for speech and debate.

==== Orchestra ====
The Olathe Northwest Orchestra program is split into three separate orchestras: the Freshmen Orchestra (open to freshmen), the Concert Orchestra (open to sophomores through seniors), and the Chamber/Advanced Orchestra (open to sophomores through seniors by audition). The Olathe Northwest Orchestra has four major performances in each school year. The members have also traveled and performed in Chicago, Boston, the Disney Festival at the EPCOT Center in Orlando, Florida, and the Kennedy Center in Washington, D.C.

== Notable alumni ==
- Willie Cauley-Stein, professional basketball player for the Sacramento Kings, Golden State Warriors, and Dallas Mavericks
- Shavon Shields, professional basketball player for the Fraport Skyliners

== See also ==
- List of high schools in Kansas
- List of unified school districts in Kansas

Other high schools in Olathe USD 233 school district

- Olathe East High School in Olathe
- Olathe North High School in Olathe
- Olathe South High School in Olathe
- Olathe West High School in Olathe
