= Olathe South High School =

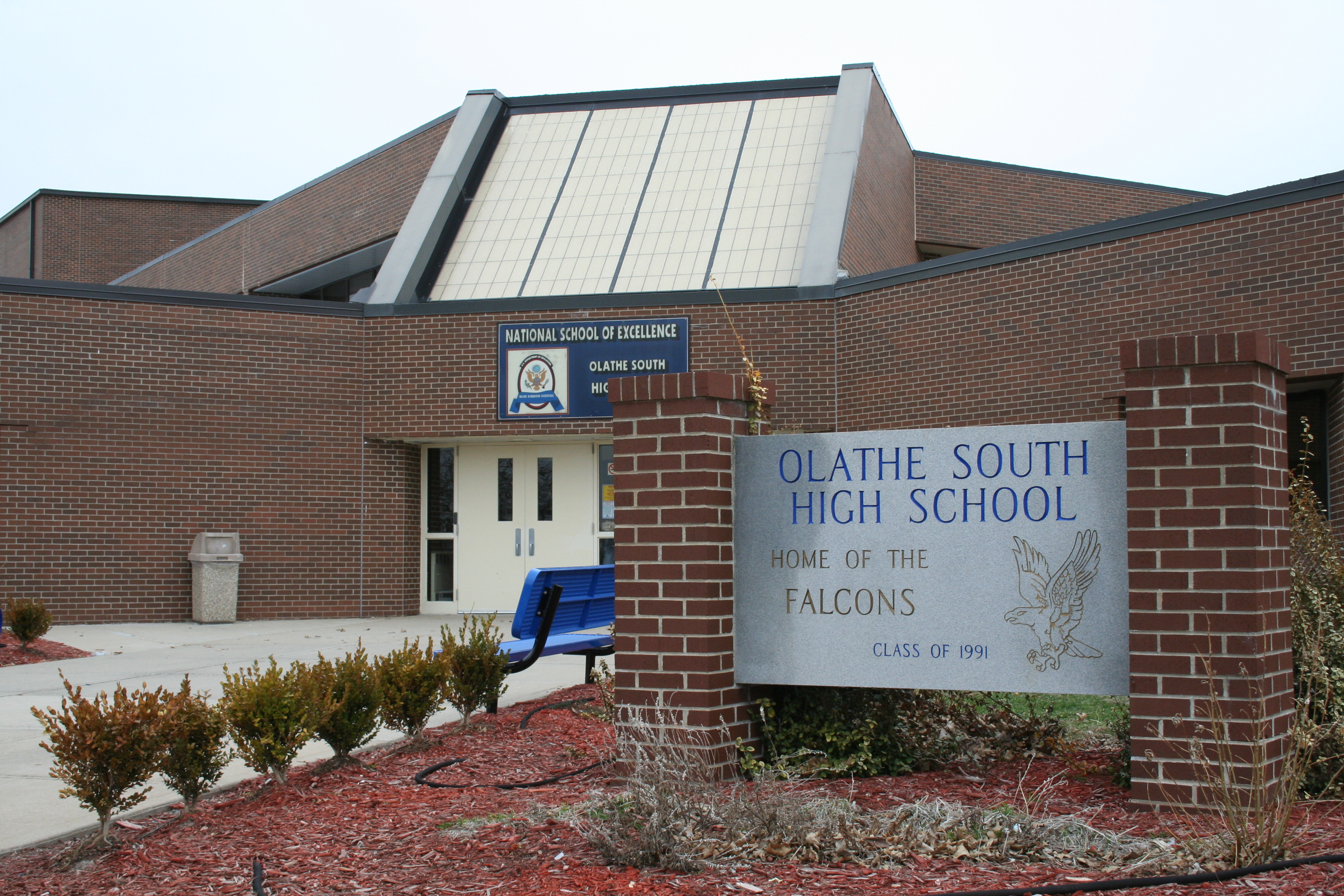
- Old entrance to South prior to 2010 remodel

Location
- 1640 East 151st Street; Olathe, Kansas 66062; United States; 38.856155°N 94.792417°W

Information
- School type: Public, High School
- Established: 1981
- School board: Board website
- School district: Olathe USD 233
- CEEB code: 172222
- Teaching staff: 119.82 (FTE)
- Grades: 9 to 12
- Enrollment: 1,843 (2023-2024)
- Student to teacher ratio: 15.38
- Campus: Suburban
- Colors: Blue and gold
- Athletics conference: Sunflower League
- Mascot: Falcon
- Rival: Olathe East High School
- Newspaper: The Eyrie
- Yearbook: The Talon
- Website: www.olatheschools.org/south/

Olathe South High School is a public high school located in Olathe, Kansas, United States, serving students in grades 9-12. It is one of five high schools in the Olathe USD 233 school district. The average annual enrollment at Olathe South is approximately 2,100 students. It is a member of the Kansas State High School Activities Association, and offers a variety of sports programs. Athletic teams compete in the 6A division and are known as the Falcons, and the official colors are blue and gold. Extracurricular activities are offered in the form of performing arts, school publications, and clubs.

== History ==
Built in 1981, Olathe South became the second high school in the Olathe public school system.

The alma mater's words and music were written by the first choral director, Steve Robertson (1981–1987).

Olathe South was recognized as a National School of Excellence for the 1990–91 school year by the U.S. Department of Education and was awarded Blue Ribbon status.

In 2002, a black box theater was added to the school. In June 2009, construction began on remodeling the school in order to accommodate ninth graders for the first time.

== Campus ==
The most notable feature of Olathe South is that it is entirely on one level. The campus is situated near the intersection of 151st and Ridgeview Roads in southern Olathe.

Adjacent to the Olathe South building on the west side of the campus is Indian Trail Middle School. Towards the northern end rests Heritage Elementary. The eastern side of the campus is the track, practice football, marching band, and soccer fields.

== Extracurricular activities ==
=== Athletics ===
The Falcons compete in the Sunflower League and are classified as a 6A school, the largest classification in Kansas according to the Kansas State High School Activities Association. Throughout its history, Olathe South has won sixteen state championships in various sports. The Olathe South Athletic Program promotes education and discipline through athletics.

=== State championships ===
State championships
Season	Sport	Number of championships	Year
Fall	Football	1	2011 2015
Fall	Cross country, boys'	1	2021
Fall	Soccer, boys'	2	1994, 2008
Fall	Volleyball	1	2005
Fall	Gymnastics	3	1989, 1992, 1994
Winter	Bowling, boys'	2	2014, 2016
Winter	Basketball, boys'	2	1997, 2004
Winter	Basketball, girls'	1	2010
Spring	Golf, boys'	1	2007
Spring	Baseball	2	1986, 1994, 2024
Spring	Softball	4	1990, 1996, 2015, 2016
Spring	Soccer, girls'	2	2003, 2006
Total		22	

== Notable alumni ==
- Sally Buzbee, former executive editor of the Washington Post
- Isaiah Campbell, MLB pitcher for the Boston Red Sox
- Don Davis, former linebacker for the New England Patriots
- Mike Gardner, college football coach
- Rob Pope, member of the prototypical indie rock band The Get Up Kids
- Ryan Pope, member of the prototypical indie rock band The Get Up Kids
- Braden Smith, offensive guard for the Indianapolis Colts
- Jim Suptic, member of the prototypical indie rock band, The Get Up Kids

== See also ==
- List of high schools in Kansas
- List of unified school districts in Kansas

Other high schools in Olathe USD 233 school district

- Olathe East High School in Olathe
- Olathe North High School in Olathe
- Olathe Northwest High School in Olathe
- Olathe West High School in Olathe

Olathe South feeder schools

- Frontier Trail Middle School
- Indian Trail Middle School
- Chisholm Trail Middle School
