= Olathe East High School =

Location
- 14545 West 127th Street; Olathe, Kansas 66062; United States; 38.896266°N 94.753503°W

Information
- School type: Public, High School
- Established: 1992; 34 years ago
- School district: Olathe USD 233
- CEEB code: 172221
- Principal: Kerry Lane
- Staff: 129.28 (FTE)
- Grades: 9 to 12
- Enrollment: 1,825 (2023-2024)
- Student to teacher ratio: 14.12
- Campus: Suburban
- Colors: Orange and Navy
- Athletics conference: Sunflower League
- Mascot: Hawk
- Accreditation: Blue Ribbon 1997
- Website: School Website

Olathe East High School is a public high school located in Olathe, Kansas, United States, serving students in grades 9–12. The school is one of five high schools in the Olathe USD 233 school district. Olathe East is a member of the Kansas State High School Activities Association and offers a variety of sports programs. Athletic teams compete in the 6A division and are known as the "Hawks". Extracurricular activities are also offered in the form of performing arts, school publications, and clubs. The school colors are orange and navy blue, and the school's mascot is the Hawk.

== History ==
The school opened in the fall of 1992 in order to help educate the rapidly increasing population of Olathe.

Olathe East was recognized as a National School of Excellence in 1998 by the U.S. Department of Education.

On March 4, 2022, there was a school shooting on campus by a student. A school resource officer and an administrator were injured, as was the shooter. No other faculty members or students were harmed in the shooting. The suspect was put in custody by the police.

== Academics ==
In 1997, Olathe East High School was selected as a Blue Ribbon School. The Blue Ribbon Award recognizes public and private schools which perform at high levels or have made significant academic improvements.

Olathe East has continuously had the highest composite standardized test scores in the district. In the 2006–2007 school year, East had a composite ACT score of 23.8, beating the national average of 21.2. On the SAT, the average score was a 604 on the Critical Reading section and a 614 on the Math section. These scores were also much higher than the national average of 503 on the Critical Reading and 518 on the Mathematics section.

== Extracurricular activities ==
The Hawks compete in the Sunflower League and are classified as a 6A school, the largest classification in Kansas according to the Kansas State High School Activities Association. Throughout its history, Olathe East has won 55 state championships in various sports, more than any other olathe school combined.

=== Athletics ===
==== Soccer ====
The boys' team has won five state championships, occurring in 1996, 2005, 2014, 2018, 2023, and 2024 and the girls' team has won four state championships, occurring in 2001, 2004, 2008, and 2012.

==== Boys' Swimming & Diving ====
The Olathe East boys' swimming & diving team won the state championship in 2009.

==== Softball ====
The Hawks have consistently been one of the best softball teams in Kansas, winning state championships in 1998, 2001, 2004, 2005, 2006, 2007, 2012, and 2013. In 2007, the Hawks set a new KSHSAA record for most consecutive state championships won in softball. Five players have been awarded the Gatorade Kansas Softball Player of the Year, Allison Stewart (2012, 2013, 2014), Eranne Daugharthy (2007), Alex Hupp (2006), Val Chapple (2005), and Tricia Tannahill (2001).

==== Track and Field ====
The Olathe East track and field team has won 10 state championships since 2007 and 11 overall, including five for boys in 1998, 2007, 2010, 2014, and 2015 and five consecutive state championships for girls from 2008 to 2012.

=== State championships ===
State Championships
Season	Sport	Number of Championships	Year
Fall	Gymnastics, Girls	9	2002, 2003, 2007, 2008, 2012, 2015, 2016, 2018, 2019
Fall	Soccer, Boys	6	1996, 2005, 2014, 2018, 2023, 2024
Fall	Volleyball, Girls	2	2013, 2014
Fall	Cross Country, Girls	5	2006, 2009, 2010, 2012, 2014
Fall	Cross Country, Boys	1	2016
Winter	Swimming and Diving, Boys	1	2009
Winter	Basketball, Boys	1	1998
Winter	Bowling, Boys	2	2011, 2020
Winter	Bowling, Girls	1	2023
Spring	Golf, Boys	2	2000, 2002
Spring	Swimming and Diving, Girls	2	2002, 2003
Spring	Baseball	2	1997, 2002
Spring	Soccer, Girls	4	2001, 2004, 2008, 2012
Spring	Softball	8	1998, 2001, 2004, 2005, 2006, 2007, 2012, 2013
Spring	Track & Field, Boys	5	1998, 2007, 2010, 2014, 2015
Spring	Track & Field, Girls	6	2008, 2009, 2010, 2011, 2012, 2016
Total		57	

=== Theatre ===
Olathe East is home to International Thespian Society Troupe 5078. Every school year Olathe East stages two mainstage musicals, along side many plays and improv shows. The department offers classes in acting, improv, and technical theatre. This program won the International Thespian Society's Outstanding School Award and has earned 109 nominations for the Starlight Blue Star Awards, a high school theatre awards program based in Kansas City and including six nominations for Outstanding Overall Production.

A notable member of International Thespian Society Troupe 5078 is Broadway actor Justin Cooley (class of 2021). Cooley went on to play the role of Seth in the off-Broadway premiere of Kimberly Akimbo. He later played the role on Broadway, which earned him Tony and Drama Desk Award nominations for Best/Outstanding Featured Actor, in a Musical.

== Notable alumni ==
- Stevie Case, professional video game player
- Justin Cooley, Broadway Actor
- Dawson Gurley, YouTube personality
- Haley Hanson, NWSL player for the Orlando Pride
- Tyler Kalinoski, professional basketball player
- Danielle McCray, WNBA player for the Connecticut Sun, former player for the Kansas Jayhawks women's basketball team
- Dan Ryckert, former video game journalist
- Scott Vermillion, professional soccer player, 1994 Kansas High School Male Athlete of the Year

== See also ==
- List of high schools in Kansas
- List of unified school districts in Kansas

Other high schools in Olathe USD 233 school district

- Olathe North High School in Olathe
- Olathe Northwest High School in Olathe
- Olathe South High School in Olathe
- Olathe West High School in Olathe
