= Olathe, Kansas =

County seat of Johnson County, Kansas

- City and County seat
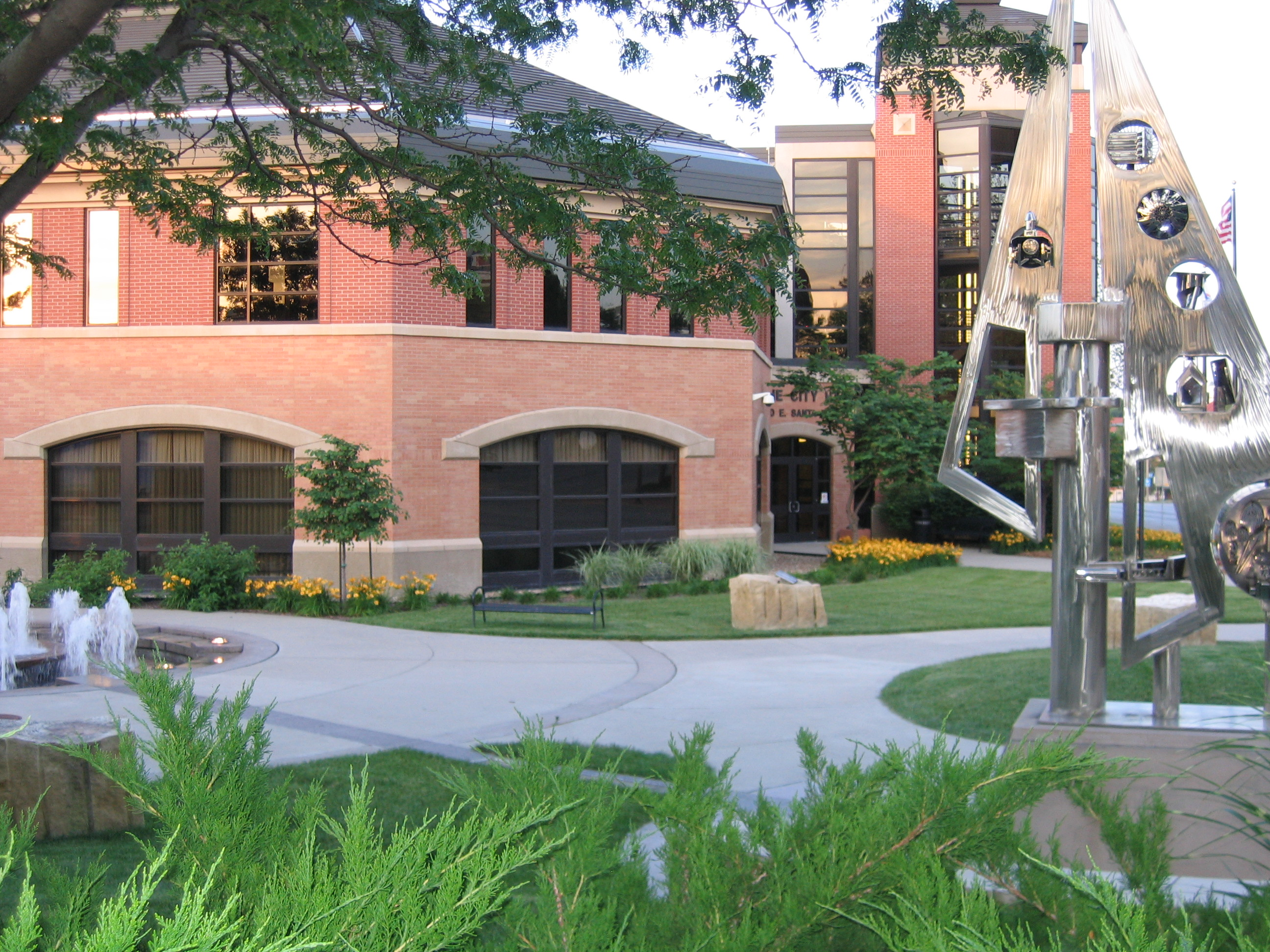
- Olathe City Hall (2010)

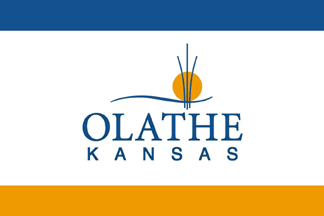
- Flag

- Location within Johnson County and Kansas
- Interactive map of Olathe, Kansas
- Coordinates: 38°52′58″N 94°49′13″W
- Country: United States
- State: Kansas
- County: Johnson
- Founded: 1857
- Incorporated: 1857, 1868

Government
  - Type: Mayor–council
  - Mayor: John Bacon

Area
  - Total: 62.38 sq mi (161.57 km^{2})
  - Land: 61.63 sq mi (159.62 km^{2})
  - Water: 0.76 sq mi (1.96 km^{2}) 1.26%
- Elevation: 1,037 ft (316 m)

Population (2020)
  - Total: 141,290
  - Estimate (2021): 143,014
  - Density: 2,292.6/sq mi (885.16/km^{2})
- Time zone: UTC-6 (CST)
  - Summer (DST): UTC-5 (CDT)
- ZIP Codes: 66051,66061,66062,66063
- Area code: 913
- FIPS code: 20-52575
- GNIS ID: 485633
- Website: www.olatheks.gov

Olathe (/oʊˈleɪθə/ oh-LAY-thə) is a city in and the county seat of Johnson County, Kansas, United States. It is the fourth-most populous city in both the Kansas City metropolitan area and the state of Kansas, with a 2020 population of 141,290.

== History ==
=== 19th century ===
Olathe was founded by John T. Barton in the spring of 1857. He rode to the center of Johnson County and staked two quarter sections of land as the town site. He later described his ride to friends: "...the prairie was covered with verbena and other wild flowers. I kept thinking the land was beautiful and that I should name the town Beautiful." Purportedly, Barton asked a Shawnee interpreter how to say "Beautiful" in his native language. The interpreter responded, "Olathe."

Olathe was incorporated in 1857, and while not the first city in Johnson County, its rapid growth led to its being named the county seat in October 1859. Rising tensions across the nation over the issue of slavery led to numerous clashes between abolitionist settlers and neighboring slave state Missouri, becoming part of a greater conflict known as Bleeding Kansas. With the admission of Kansas into the Union as a free state in 1861, violence began to dissipate. Peace continued to elude Olathe for many years to come, however. In 1861, Union officials and local military forces created a military post in the city. It housed one company of troops along with the local militia.

On September 6, 1862, William Quantrill led a surprise raid of guerrilla Confederates against the city, which resulted in a half dozen deaths and the destruction of most of the city. Quantrill captured the outpost and tried forcing the men to swear an oath to the Confederacy. The oath was deemed invalid in November 1862, since the guerrillas were not considered legitimate enemy military units. Kansas militia continued to occupy the Olathe military post through the rest of the Civil War.

Confederate forces attempted two further raids against the city. The first happened on August 20–21, 1863, as Quantrill was passing through on his way to Lawrence, Kansas (see Lawrence Massacre). The second raid occurred October 24–5, 1864, when Confederate Major General Sterling Price, with a force of 10,000 men, passed through on their retreat south (see Price's Raid). With the Confederate surrender, the military post was decommissioned in August 1865.

Olathe served as a stop on the Oregon Trail, the California Trail, and the Santa Fe Trail. Catering to travelers was the main source of income for local stores and businesses. The Mahaffie House, a popular resupply point for wagons headed westward, is today a registered historical site maintained by the City of Olathe. The staff wears period costumes, and stagecoach rides and farm animals make the site a favorite among children. Visitors can participate in Civil War re-enactments, Wild West Days, and other activities.

After the construction of the transcontinental railroad, the trails to the west lost importance, and Olathe faded into obscurity and remained a small, sleepy prairie town.

=== 20th century ===
In the 1950s, the construction of the interstate highway system and, more directly, Interstate 35, linked Olathe to nearby Kansas City, Missouri. The result was tremendous residential growth as Olathe became a part of the Kansas City metropolitan area. In the 1980s, Olathe experienced a boom in commerce, which drew more residents. Olathe's population is estimated to have surpassed 100,000 in 2001, and later projections showed Olathe's growth continuing as the city expanded into the farm fields south, west, and north of town.

== Geography ==
Olathe is bordered by the cities of Lenexa to the north, Overland Park to the east, De Soto to the northwest, and Gardner to the southwest.

According to the United States Census Bureau, the city has a total area of 60.42 square miles (156.49 km^{2}) of which 59.66 square miles (154.52 km^{2}) are land and 0.76 square miles (1.97 km^{2}) is covered by water. Olathe has two public lakes: Lake Olathe with 172 acres (0.70 km^{2}) of water surface and Cedar Lake with 45 acres (0.18 km^{2}).

Olathe's Black Bob Park is named after Hathawekela Shawnee Chief Black Bob.

=== Climate ===
Olathe has a humid continental climate, with cold winters and hot summers. Temperatures range from an average high of 39 °F (4 °C) and low 20 °F (−7 °C) in January to an average high of nearly 90 °F (32 °C) in July. The temperature reaches 90 °F (32 °C) an average of 36 days per year and 100 °F (38 °C) an average of three days per year. The minimum temperature falls below freezing (32 °F) an average of 102 days per year, but rarely drops below 10 °F (−12 °C). Typically, the first frost occurs between mid-October and the first week of November, and the last frost occurs between the end of March and the second week of April.

The area receives approximately 40 inches (1,000 mm) of precipitation during an average year, with the largest share being received in May and June; the April–June period averages 30 days of measurable precipitation. During a typical year, the total amount of precipitation may range from 28 to almost 53 inches. On average, 95 days of measurable precipitation occur per year. Winter snowfall averages about 19 inches, but the median is 13 inches (330 mm). Measurable snowfall occurs an average of nine days per year, with at least an inch of snow being received on seven of those days. Snow depth of at least an inch occurs an average of 25 days per year.

Climate data for Olathe, Kansas (1991–2020 normals, extremes 1893–2009)
Month	Jan	Feb	Mar	Apr	May	Jun	Jul	Aug	Sep	Oct	Nov	Dec	Year
Record high °F (°C)	74 (23)	81 (27)	92 (33)	96 (36)	101 (38)	107 (42)	114 (46)	111 (44)	107 (42)	98 (37)	85 (29)	76 (24)	114 (46)
Mean daily maximum °F (°C)	38.7 (3.7)	44.3 (6.8)	54.9 (12.7)	65.1 (18.4)	74.5 (23.6)	83.6 (28.7)	88.2 (31.2)	86.8 (30.4)	79.1 (26.2)	67.7 (19.8)	54.3 (12.4)	42.5 (5.8)	65.0 (18.3)
Daily mean °F (°C)	29.3 (−1.5)	34.1 (1.2)	44.3 (6.8)	54.5 (12.5)	65.0 (18.3)	74.3 (23.5)	78.8 (26.0)	76.9 (24.9)	68.8 (20.4)	57.2 (14.0)	44.5 (6.9)	33.5 (0.8)	55.1 (12.8)
Mean daily minimum °F (°C)	20.0 (−6.7)	23.9 (−4.5)	33.7 (0.9)	43.9 (6.6)	55.5 (13.1)	64.9 (18.3)	69.4 (20.8)	66.9 (19.4)	58.4 (14.7)	46.7 (8.2)	34.6 (1.4)	24.6 (−4.1)	45.2 (7.3)
Record low °F (°C)	−26 (−32)	−29 (−34)	−8 (−22)	8 (−13)	22 (−6)	39 (4)	45 (7)	41 (5)	29 (−2)	15 (−9)	−2 (−19)	−22 (−30)	−29 (−34)
Average precipitation inches (mm)	1.28 (33)	1.73 (44)	2.48 (63)	4.12 (105)	5.26 (134)	5.23 (133)	4.75 (121)	4.46 (113)	4.25 (108)	3.05 (77)	2.37 (60)	1.75 (44)	40.73 (1,035)
Average snowfall inches (cm)	3.9 (9.9)	3.3 (8.4)	1.4 (3.6)	0.3 (0.76)	0.0 (0.0)	0.0 (0.0)	0.0 (0.0)	0.0 (0.0)	0.0 (0.0)	0.3 (0.76)	1.2 (3.0)	3.4 (8.6)	13.8 (35)
Average precipitation days (≥ 0.01 in)	6.4	5.8	8.1	10.2	11.8	9.7	8.6	7.5	8.0	7.9	6.7	6.4	97.1
Average snowy days (≥ 0.1 in)	3.6	2.1	1.0	0.2	0.0	0.0	0.0	0.0	0.0	0.1	0.7	2.6	10.3
Source: NOAA

== Demographics ==
Historical population
Census	Pop.	Note	%±
1870	1,817		—
1880	2,285		25.8%
1890	3,294		44.2%
1900	3,451		4.8%
1910	3,272		−5.2%
1920	3,268		−0.1%
1930	3,656		11.9%
1940	3,979		8.8%
1950	5,593		40.6%
1960	10,987		96.4%
1970	17,921		63.1%
1980	37,258		107.9%
1990	63,440		70.3%
2000	92,962		46.5%
2010	125,872		35.4%
2020	141,290		12.2%
2025 (est.)	150,025		6.2%
U.S. Decennial Census; 2010–2020

=== 2020 census ===
Olathe, Kansas – Racial and ethnic composition Note: the US Census treats Hispanic/Latino as an ethnic category. This table excludes Latinos from the racial categories and assigns them to a separate category. Hispanics/Latinos may be of any race.
Race / Ethnicity (NH = Non-Hispanic)	Pop 2000	Pop 2010	Pop 2020	% 2000	% 2010	% 2020
White alone (NH)	80,157	97,840	100,691	86.23%	77.73%	71.27%
Black or African American alone (NH)	3,390	6,474	8,262	3.65%	5.14%	5.85%
Native American or Alaska Native alone (NH)	348	436	414	0.37%	0.35%	0.29%
Asian alone (NH)	2,524	5,100	6,293	2.72%	4.05%	4.45%
Native Hawaiian or Pacific Islander alone (NH)	39	77	115	0.04%	0.06%	0.08%
Other race alone (NH)	157	240	620	0.17%	0.19%	0.44%
Mixed race or Multiracial (NH)	1,287	2,911	7,410	1.38%	2.31%	5.24%
Hispanic or Latino (any race)	5,060	12,794	17,485	5.44%	10.16%	12.38%
Total	92,962	125,872	141,290	100.00%	100.00%	100.00%

The 2020 United States census counted 141,290 people, 50,070 households, and 37,409 families in Olathe. The population density was 2,282.8 per square mile (881.4/km^{2}). There were 51,820 housing units at an average density of 837.2 per square mile (323.3/km^{2}). The racial makeup (including Hispanics in the racial counts) was 73.89% (104,405) white or European American (71.27% non-Hispanic white), 5.98% (8,444) black or African-American, 0.52% (735) Native American or Alaska Native, 4.48% (6,336) Asian, 0.09% (125) Pacific Islander or Native Hawaiian, 4.77% (6,739) from other races, and 10.27% (14,506) from two or more races.

The racial and ethnic makeup (where Hispanics are excluded from the racial counts and placed in their own category) was 71.27% (100,691) White alone (non-Hispanic), 5.85% (8,262) Black alone (non-Hispanic), 0.29% (414) Native American alone (non-Hispanic), 4.45% (6,293) Asian alone (non-Hispanic), 0.08% (115) Pacific Islander alone (non-Hispanic), 0.44% (620) Other Race alone (non-Hispanic), 5.24% (7,410) Multiracial or Mixed Race (non-Hispanic), and 12.38% (17,845) Hispanic or Latino.

Of the 50,070 households, 40.1% had children under the age of 18; 60.0% were married couples living together; 20.7% had a female householder with no spouse or partner present. 20.2% of households consisted of individuals and 7.7% had someone living alone who was 65 years of age or older. The average household size was 2.8 and the average family size was 3.3. The percent of those with a bachelor's degree or higher was estimated to be 32.7% of the population.

27.7% of the population was under the age of 18, 7.9% from 18 to 24, 27.8% from 25 to 44, 24.4% from 45 to 64, and 12.3% who were 65 years of age or older. The median age was 36.3 years. For every 100 females, there were 102.0 males. For every 100 females ages 18 and older, there were 104.9 males.

The 2016–2020 5-year American Community Survey estimates show that the median household income was $96,548 (with a margin of error of +/- $1,957) and the median family income was $105,927 (+/- $2,403). Males had a median income of $54,705 (+/- $1,766) versus $36,251 (+/- $2,111) for females. The median income for those above 16 years old was $45,840 (+/- $1,393). Approximately, 3.9% of families and 5.5% of the population were below the poverty line, including 6.6% of those under the age of 18 and 5.8% of those ages 65 or over.

=== 2010 census ===
As of the census of 2010, 125,872 people, 44,507 households, and 33,274 families were residing in the city. The population density was 2,109.8 inhabitants per square mile (814.6/km^{2}). The 46,851 housing units had an average density of 785.3 per square mile (303.2/km^{2}). The racial makeup of the city was 83.1% White, 5.3% African American, 0.4% Native American, 4.1% Asian, 4.2% from other races, and 3.0% from two or more races. Hispanic or Latino residents of any race were 10.2% of the population.

Of the 44,507 households, 44.1% had children under the age of 18 living with them, 60.9% were married couples living together, 9.6% had a female householder with no husband present, 4.3% had a male householder with no wife present, and 25.2% were not families. About 20.0% of all households were made up of individuals, and 5.3% had someone living alone who was 65 or older. The average household size was 2.80, and the average family size was 3.24.

The median age in the city was 32.9 years; 30% of residents were under the age of 18; 7.5% were between 18 and 24; 32.1% were from 25 to 44; 23.1% were from 45 to 64; and 7.2% were 65 or older. The gender makeup of the city was 49.5% male and 50.5% female.

== Economy ==
Olathe's commercial and industrial parks are home to many companies, including Honeywell, Husqvarna, ALDI, Garmin, Grundfos, and Farmers Insurance Group. Although Farmers Insurance is based in Los Angeles, California, Olathe has more of its employees than any other city in the United States.

The Federal Aviation Administration administers and maintains an air traffic-control center in Olathe, designated Kansas City Center or ZKC. Kansas City Center is one of 20 regional traffic-control centers that cover United States airspace. Johnson County maintains an airport in Olathe, Johnson County Executive Airport, which is located on about 500 acres (2.0 km^{2}) of land with a 4,100-ft (1250-m) runway, parallel taxiways, and a federal contract air traffic-control tower. The airport is the second-busiest in the state.

=== Largest employers ===
According to the city's 2022 Comprehensive Annual Financial Report, the largest employers in the city are:

Number	Employer	Employees
1	GARMIN International	4,600
2	Olathe Unified School District	4,500
3	Olathe Health System	2,500
4	Johnson County Government	2,400
5	Farmers Insurance	1,733
6	City of Olathe	962
7	TransAm Trucking	800
8	TVH	670
9	FAA/Air Route Traffic Control Systems	600
10	Honeywell Aerospace Electronics Systems	561

== Education ==
The city of Olathe is served by the Olathe USD 233, De Soto USD 232, Spring Hill USD 230, Blue Valley USD 229, and Gardner–Edgerton USD 231 school districts.

As of 2008, 26,894 students are enrolled in the Olathe USD 233 school district. The Olathe School District has 36 elementary schools, 10 middle schools, and five high schools: Olathe North, Olathe South, Olathe East, Olathe Northwest, and Olathe West.

Olathe is the home of MidAmerica Nazarene University and the Kansas School for the Deaf (established in 1861).

== Infrastructure ==
=== Airports ===
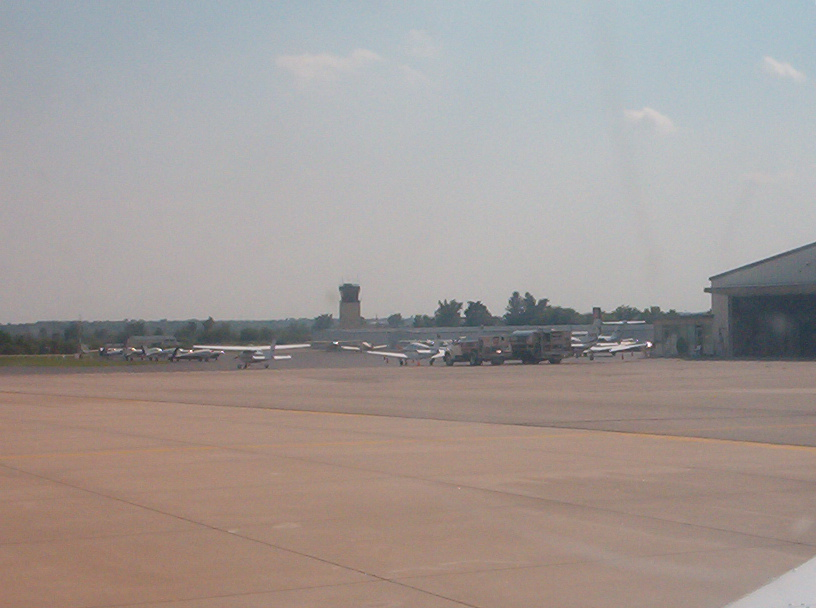
Johnson County Executive Airport

Olathe is served by:

- Johnson County Executive Airport
- New Century AirCenter

The closest airport with airline service is Kansas City International Airport in Platte County, Missouri.

=== Bus ===
- Johnson County Transit operates a bus system throughout the county, including Olathe.
- The closest intercity bus service is provided at Kansas City Bus Station

=== Rail ===
- BNSF Railway's Chicago-Los Angeles main line runs through Olathe.
- The closest passenger rail service is provided at Kansas City Union Station

== Notable people ==
Willie Aames (born Albert William Upton) is an American actor, film and television director, television producer, and screenwriter. Aames is well known for playing Tommy Bradford on the 1970s television series Eight Is Enough, Buddy Lembeck on the 1980s series Charles in Charge, and Bibleman.

John Anderson, Jr., was the 36th governor of Kansas from 1961 until 1965. He was born near Olathe.

Earl Browder, a prominent leader in the American Communist movement, served as chairman of the National Committee of the Communist Party USA from 1934 to 1945. He was also the Communist Party USA's candidate for president in the 1936 and 1940 presidential elections.

Jonathan Quinn is a former head football coach (2009–2013) for the MidAmerica Nazarene Pioneers football team. Quinn played for the NFL Kansas City Chiefs and Chicago Bears, and Berlin Thunder of NFL Europe.

Darren Sproles is a former running back in the NFL, who played for the San Diego Chargers, New Orleans Saints, and Philadelphia Eagles. He was drafted by the Chargers in the fourth round of the 2005 NFL draft. He was a three-time Pro Bowler (2014–2016), a three-time First-team All-Pro (2011, 2014, 2015), and won Super Bowl LII with the Philadelphia Eagles. He played college football at Kansas State University, and high school football at Olathe North High School. Sproles retired as a player after the 2019 season, but still works in the NFL as an executive.

Buddy Rogers was an American actor who played the leading role in Wings (1927), which won the first Academy Award for Best Picture in 1929. He was also a notable jazz musician and film producer. The actor was married to film legend Mary Pickford and won an honorary Oscar in 1986.

Charles Miller was a saxophonist and flautist for the multicultural California funk band War. He was the lead singer and saxophonist on the 1975 song Low Rider.

== In popular culture ==
- 1967– Olathe is an important location in the film In Cold Blood starring Robert Blake and Scott Wilson.
- 2003– Olathe is a location in the documentary Lost Boys of Sudan directed by Megan Mylan and Jon Shenk.
