= Master of Arts in Higher Education =

A Master of Arts or Master of Science in Higher Education or MAHE or MSHE degree is a master's degree that enables recipients to work in a variety of higher education-related fields, most notably student development. The degree, which often contains a blend of student development theory, organizational structure theory, research, and practical foci, is a typical entry point into residence life, student activities, international student affairs, and a plethora of other college administration positions.

Degree delivery occurs on a spectrum, from the full-time cohort model to distance programs designed for professionals already employed full-time at an institution.
