= Song of the Flame (film) =

1930 American musical film

- Directed by: Alan Crosland
- Written by: Gordon Rigby (screen version & dialogue)
- Based on: Song of the Flame (1925 operetta) by Oscar Hammerstein II and Otto A. Harbach
- Starring: Alexander Gray; Bernice Claire
- Cinematography: Lee Garmes (Technicolor)
- Edited by: Al Hall
- Music by: (see article)
- Production company: First National Pictures
- Distributed by: Warner Bros. Pictures
- Release dates: May 6, 1930 (NYC); May 25, 1930 (US)
- Running time: 70 minutes
- Country: United States
- Language: English

Song of the Flame is a 1930 American pre-Code musical film photographed entirely in Technicolor. Based on the 1925 operetta of the same name, the film features a screenplay by Gordon Rigby adapted from the musical book written by Oscar Hammerstein II and Otto A. Harbach for the operetta. The movie also features many of the songs from the operetta which used lyrics by Hammerstein and Orbach and music by George Gershwin and Herbert Stothart. The film was produced and distributed by First National Pictures. It was the first color film to feature a widescreen sequence, using a process called Vitascope, the trademark name for Warner Bros. Pictures' widescreen process. The film was nominated for an Academy Award for Sound Recording (George Groves). It is part of the tradition of operetta films, popular at the time.

== Plot ==
Lantern slide for the film

Disk 1: The movie starts with a title sequence with an orchestra playing in the background. This then switches to chants. Two men, one being Konstantin, start talking about it. They explain how they sung it as children, and their fathers before them. They describe it as "The lament of old Russia", and express a desire for a new song to "Melt the snows that are chilling our hearts", snow which can only be melted by fire. Konstantin reveals that he has heart such a song before, sung by a girl known as "The flame", and how he has been hunting for her ever since. He then goes up and announces to the crowd listening to the song that it is "beautiful... for cowards", drawing anger. Anuita is now introduced. She agrees with his sentiment, and sings a "Song of life, of courage, of freedom", the Song of the Flame. She is seen as a sort of Joan of Arc, and given the title of The Flame. With encouragement from Konstantin, the crowd sings along with this new song. Gunshots and screaming are then heard as the Czarist army attempts to capture Anuita, to stop the spread of her revolutionary song.

Disks 2 and 3 are considered lost. Much less information is known about what happens here. It seems that Anuita switched to the side of the Aristocrats in some sort of way.

Disks 4 & 5: The scene begins at a festival in the capital of Petrograd. Traditional Russian folk musk is heard for a few minutes. 2 Tartar aristocrats are now speaking, one named Natasha. Konstantin arrives to them, and reveals the news about the Flame appearing and causing a ruckus. They are, however, quite dismissive of the threat of it causing a revolution. This is then followed by more singing and dancing. Prince Volodya then sings the countries national anthem, about loyalty to the regime. Just after, a crowd of revolutionists appear, singing the Song of the Flame. Gunshots are then heard.The scene cuts back to the Aristocrats. Natasha is trying on new clothes and jewelry. Konstantin calls her a fool, as the lavish clothes expose their wealth. Konstantin tells staff to give a man the "usual sentence" and he is placed against a wall ready for execution. Anuita appears, and he claims she arrived just in time to witness the "Exe.. [cution]", though stops himself and corrects it to "celebration". Konstantin and Anuita go to the side. She asks him for help to undo the wrong that has been done in the revolution. She claims her song was meant to be for "Light and freedom" but has been spun into "Madness and anarchy". Konstantin calls her delirious, and expresses concern about the public finding out that Anuita was now a traitor and doesn't agree with the revolution. She commands him to stop, but he refuses. The man from before is then executed. This greatly angers Anuita. She claims that The Flame was lightened in hell. The movie then cuts to a harvest festival. A crowd sings Schtchedryck. Natasha, seeing that Anuita is unhappy, tells her "Oh Anuita don't be sad, why today's our festival! Come and dance with us?" before The Goose is Hanging High is sung. Prince Volodya and his cousin Nickolas then give a speech to the crowd, thanking the masses for their loyalty. More dancing is then held. The Prince and Nicholas comment to each other, seeing her dance, on how Anuita is attractive and charming. Anuita and Natasha also comment to themselves on how the Prince and his cousin Nicholas and handsome. Volodya offers up the chance to dance with him to the crowd, which Anuita accepts.

Disk 6 is also not available publicly. Supposedly it followed the growing romance between Anuita and Volodya.

Disk 7: At this point in time, Anuita and Prince Volodya are now in love. There was some sort of dance that was going on, when the revolutionists arrived in Petrograd, where they were, and caused mayhem. Konstantin is there. He expresses his demands to the people in the town about land redistribution, and refusal to this order would lead to death. Volodya is warned by Nicholas, though is sure that his people are loyal, and does not call off a party at the palace that night. The film then cuts to Konstantin, singing "One Little Drink" in a tavern. The film now cuts to the party in the palace. Konstantin arrives, and takes Anuita with him outside. After strong refusal to cooperate, Konstantin threatens the life of Volodya, which causes her to comply. He forces her to go to the revolutionaries and sing to the peasants in exchange for the promise that Volodya will survive the revolution. Konstantin introduces her to the crowd, and forces her to very reluctantly sing Song of the Flame. The crowd then follows Konstantin and Anuita to the palace, singing the song throughout. They arrive at the palace and storm it, armed. It is chaotically raided. They doors are locked to prevent aristocrats from escaping.

Disk 8 is not available online yet. It follows the raid on the palace, and the escape of Volodya.

Disk 9: Volodya returns to Russia, despite risking being put to death for doing so, looking for Anuita. While she was meant to be sent to Siberia, Konstantin kept her "here", wherever this scene takes place. It cuts to Konstantin is visiting Anuita after not seeing her for a few months. He tells her about how the revolution has paid him well, and how he will take her to Paris. Refusal to this offer is alluded to be punished by death. Volodya then arrives, to the surprise of Konstantin. Volodya begs Konstantin to let Anuita go. Konstantin goes more into detail about how all he wanted from the revolution was money, and now that he had hijacked it, he wishes to leave Russia. He then calls for his guards to take care of Volodya. revolutionist authorities behind the door, who overheard Konstantin talk about his real motivations, condemn him for hijacking the revolution and stealing. Konstantin is then taken away to the execution area. When asked for final words, he sings "One Little Drink" before being cut off by the firing squad, and dies. He is killed in the same way as the royals which he had ordered executed previously, giving him a karmic ending. The movie ends with Anuita and Volodya singing "The Goose is Hanging High" happily, now together again at last.

== Cast ==
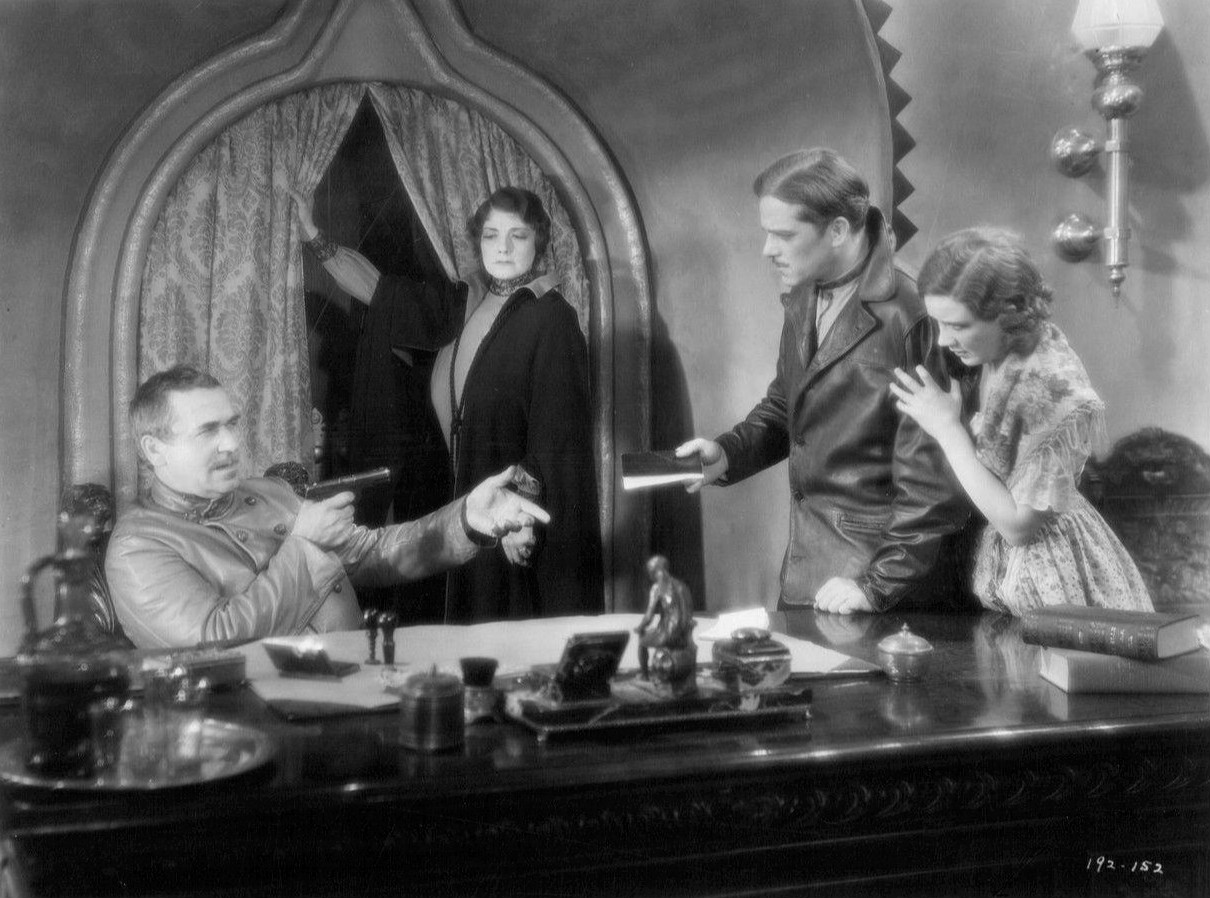
From left: Noah Beery, Alice Gentle, Alexander Gray and Bernice Claire in a scene from the film

- Alexander Gray as Prince Volodya
- Bernice Claire as Aniuta, The Flame
- Noah Beery as Konstantin
- Alice Gentle as Natasha
- Bert Roach as Nicholas
- Inez Courtney as Grusha
- Shep Camp as Officer
- Ivan Linow as Konstanin's Pal
- Janina Smolinska as Dancer (uncredited)

Cast notes:

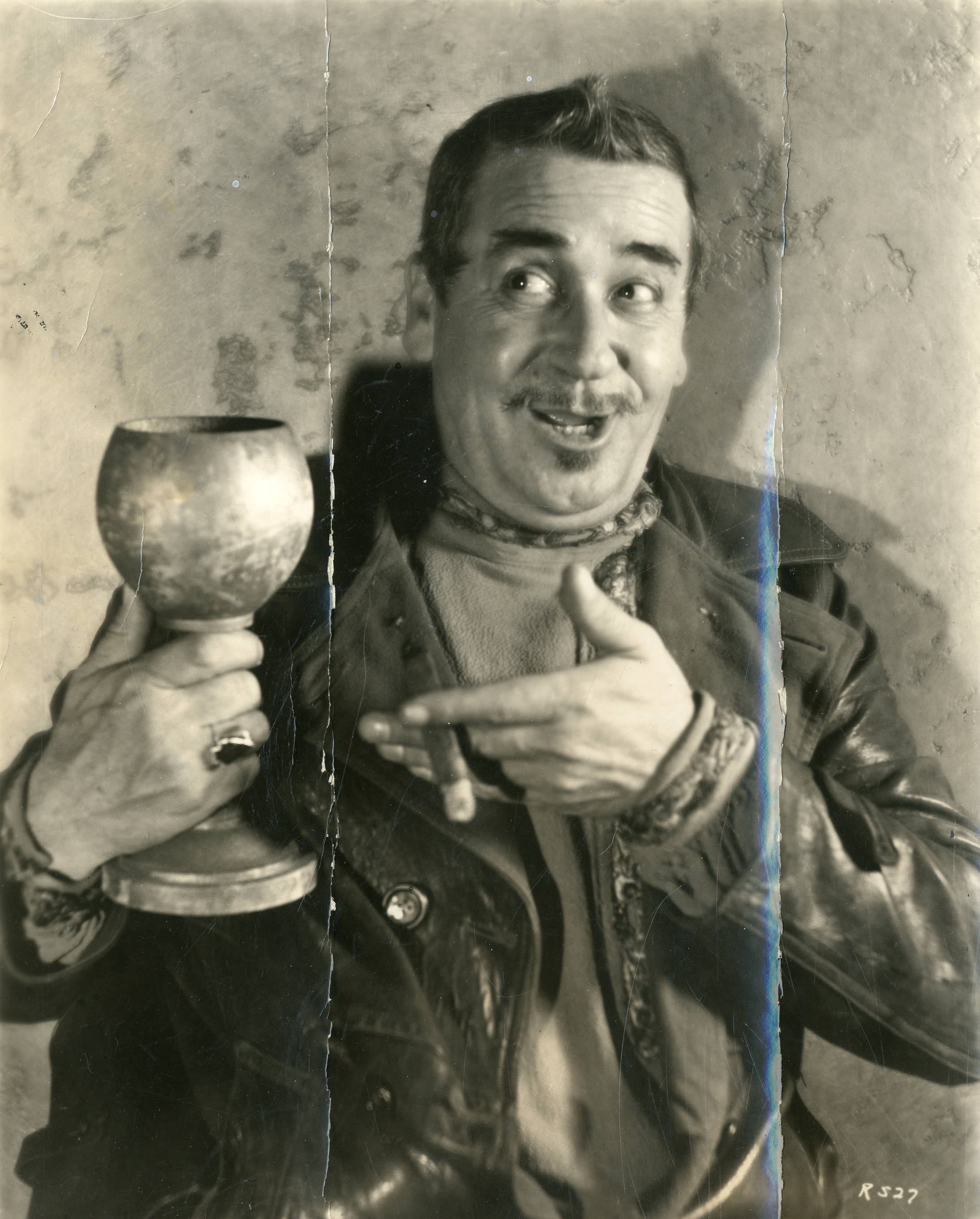
Still from the film, showing Noah Beery and his "One Little Drink"

- Noah Beery was widely praised for his deep bass voice, which he first exhibited in this film in the song "One Little Drink." Based on the success of this song, Warner Bros. subsequently cast Beery in a number of musical films, most notably in Golden Dawn (1930). The public was so enthralled by his singing abilities that Brunswick Records hired Beery to record songs from both of these films which were issued in their popular series.
- Alice Gentle had to lose quite a bit of weight in preparation for her role as Natasha. This was the first feature film she acted in, as she was more of an opera singer than actress. Noah Beery was "pleasantly surprised by her powerful voice"
- During a horse riding scene, actress Shep Camp fell off a horse, dying 2 days later from internal injuries at 47 years old.
- There were a total of roughly 5,000 background actors employed for this film.
- Thousands of the background actors were actual Russian immigrants. Many of which were former Cossack veterans from the Russian revolution. 6 Russian speaking directors were used to help coordinate the crowd scenes due to the high population of Russians on the set, who may have not understood English well.
- There were nearly 500 dancers hired for the film.
- For scenes which required large amounts of horsemen, ex-Cossack soldiers, American Cowboys, and Guachos were hired as background actors for these parts.

== Songs ==
The "Song of the Flame" preformed by Carl Fenton Orchestra, 1926.

- "Song of the Flame" – words by Otto Harbach and Oscar Hammerstein II, music by George Gershwin
- "Cossack Love Song" – words by Otto Harbach and Oscar Hammerstein II, music by Herbert Stothart and George Gershwin
- Sheet music for the composition for "Cossack Love Song"
  "One Little Drink" – words by Grant Clarke, music by Harry Akst
- "When Love Calls" – words by Grant Clarke, music by Eddie Ward
- "The Goose Hangs High" – words by Grant Clarke, music by Harry Akst and Edward Ward.This song is notably parodied in the 1930 Looney Tunes short "The Booze Hangs High". (Not to be confused with "The Goose Hangs High (play)", "The Goose Hangs High (film)", "The Goose Hangs High (1930s Song)", or "The Goose Flies High (1938 short)" )
- "Liberty Song" words by Grant Clarke, music by Harry Akst and Edward Ward. Sung thrice by Alice Gentle as Natasha.
- "Passing Fancy" – words by Grant Clarke, music by Harry Akst and Edward Ward. Sung by Alice Gentle as Natasha.
- "Petrograd" – words by Grant Clarke, music by Harry Akst and Edward Ward. This song is used as the national anthem for the Czarist regime which rules over the first part of the movie. It is sung by Alexander Gray as Prince Volodya along with a choir of other loyalists.
- "Wander Away" – words by Otto Harbach and Oscar Hammerstein II, music by George Gershwin, sung by Alice Gentle as Natasha.

Along with the songs created for the film, there were also 4 Russian folk songs utilized. These are "Prayer" and "Beriozka", both by Pyotr Ilyich Tchaikovsky, Grechanivi, and Schtchedryck, known as "Carol of the Bells" in English.

All but three songs from the original Operetta were included in the film.

== Production ==
Behind the scenes shot of the production for "Song of The Flame", showing the orchestra and cameras.The setting is the square in front of the imperial palace of Petrograd.

The film was presumably produced between the final revision of the screenplay on October 24, 1929, and Shep Camp's death on November 20, 1929, and its release in May 1930. The movie was filmed for roughly six months. It was filmed at a cost of over $1,000,000, which was not uncommon for large films of the era. It, however, only grossed $900,000, losing money overall.

The film was fully made in two strip Technicolor and Vitaphone, one of the first of its time to do so, of the first score or so. Two different types of Technicolor cameras were used due to the differences with sunlight, night and indoor exposure. Five cameras in total were used on this production, occupying roughly half of the Technicolor cameras available in Hollywood at that time. This was due to multiple cameras being needed to record the lavish crowd scenes, as they were expensive to do multiple takes of. For this film, a 201 foot tall camera tower was built in First National Studio, to film some of the scenes.

Due to the limitations of the two strip technicolor process, fitting rooms during production were made to be blue-green, so actors could better understand how they would look to the cameras.

Throughout the movie, there is a live orchestra on set playing the songs, as due to technical limitations with the Vitaphone, it was very difficult to dub in audio after the fact.

Once a week throughout the filming, the main cast had to watch Czarist propaganda newsreel fragments from the Russian Revolution to better get an understanding of the setting and their characters. A total of 15 reels of Russian films were used as research for the film. A total of 28 large sets, and 50 smaller ones, were made for the film. These include recreations of parts of Moscow, Petrograd, Czarist palaces, and small farming villages. Construction of these was overseen by the films technical expert Nicholas Kobliansky, who was a former soldier and agent for the Russian government. Due to the hot lights needed for the Technicolor cameras, some of the sets were fitted with ammonia cooling systems to allow for filming. Some of the exterior scenes of the movie were shot on Warner Ranch, whilst certain other scenes were filmed in Vitagraph studios. Harry Redmond was the explosives expert on set for the film.

== International Screenings ==
It made it to the Sydney Australia somewhere around August of 1930. It was shown up until at least 1934 in an Ozone Theatre in Adalade.

It was shown in New Zealand in October of 1930, until November of the same year, and for quite a bit into 1931 as well. It was last known to have screened on June 29th of 1933. These were at various theatres, including St. James Theatre, Regent Theatre, Princess theatre, Victoria theatre, Whangārei, The King's Theatre,, Gaiety de Luxe Theatre, Majestic Theatre, Cosy de Luxe, among others.

It had some screenings in Canada, it was shown in Capitol Theatre in British Columbia in May 1930, at The Orpheum Theatre in Alberta Canada in December of 1931, and in Toronto in January of 1931.

It was shown in Brazil in January 1931, and was called "A Flamma" in Portuguese.

It was shown in Ireland in December 1930 in the Metropole Cinime.

== Critical response ==
The Song of The Flame received mixed reviews from critics.

Pare Lorentz described the music as good, but the story as forgettable, and the visuals blurry.

The Billboard described the story as "quite ordinary", and that the film was "lacking", though enjoys the acting and singing of Bernice Claire as Aniuta.

Richard Dana Skinner wrote in "The Commonweal" that "it runs a close second to The Vagabond King in general excellence" particularly enjoying the scenes of disorder and chaos, saying those scenes "stir not only the highest praise, but also the imagination". He says that it was a "thoroughly acceptable tale". He also mentions that the "concerted use of detail is staggering."

The New Age praises the crowd scenes and the music from the film. They criticize the use of technicolor, as it made the film more blurry, and would have preferred if it was filmed in sharper black and white film.

Harry Evans writes in Life (humor magazine) "There is little to recommend... ...other than the excellent color photography" blaming inconsistent recording quality as the main gripe. He also notes that the Aristocrats being shown in a positive light was unfavorable to him.

Creighton Peet complains in The Outlook that the movie is too silly giving its subject matter, and criticizes the fact that the aristocrats were shown as being kindly. He claims it was not worthwhile.

Harrison's reports says "Of the operettas that have so far been produced, this seems to be the best. Beautiful color, good acting, excellent singing, interesting plot." Motion Picture News claims that the colors and music are gorgeous. Variety claims that there is "No reason why this picture should not at least hit regular average in best houses."

== Preservation ==
The only known moving frames to be extant.

The film has been believed to be lost since at least 2004. Of its original nine reels (or 6,456 feet) of film, very little of the film is known to be extant today. The soundtrack was recorded separately on Vitaphone disks. Of the 9 original disks, 7 exist today, (though, as of October 2026, 2 are actively being restored and are not available (6 & 8).) holding the audio of 52 minutes of the 70 minute film. All nine songs are preserved in the sound disc performances. There were four choruses as well, three of traditional Russian folk tunes and one drawn from Tchaikovsky's The Nutcracker.

A 3-minute trailer for the film exists in the AFI and BFI catalogs.

An additional few dozen stills exist in the BFI archive.

The screenplay of this film is not publicly available online, though still exists privately in archives. One of the surviving copies is being held privately in the archives of Princeton University.

== Looney Tunes connection ==
Song of the Flame is notable as the film that was accompanied in its initial release by Warner Bros.' first Looney Tunes cartoon short, Sinkin' in the Bathtub.

A second connection comes with "The Booze Hangs High", the fourth Looney Tunes cartoon short, parodying two songs from the film, "The Goose Hangs High" as well as "One Little Drink".

== Similar movies ==
Despite being lost, there are other movies from this era which were quite similar in certain ways. The ones which are still extant can give further insight into what Song of The Flame may have been like.

The Flame Song (1934) is likely the closest film to be intact to Song of the Flame. It was essentially, the movie condensed into just 20 minutes, staring Bernice Claire and Alexander Gray, but notably Gray plays a different character. It seems to still be quite far off to what Song of the Flame was though.

Viennese Nights was a 1930 technicolor Warner Brothers film directed by Alan Crosland and starring Alexander Gray, based on a play by Oscar Hammerstein. It is probably the closest surviving film to Song of the Flame.

Song of the West was another Warner Brothers musical historical drama based on a play by Oscar Hammerstein and Otto Harbach. It, however, is also a lost film. Like Song of The Flame, is was shot entirely in two strip technicolor. It was completed just two months before Song of The Flame.

The Desert Song (1929) was another Warner Brothers musical historical drama based on a play by Oscar Hammerstein and Otto Harbach following revolutionaries. Like Song of the Flame, it was also shot on two strip Technicolor and Vitaphone disks. It is fully extant today. The same story for this was used for the 1932 short "The Red Shadow" which starred Bernice Claire and Alexander Grey. It remains extant.

Spring Is Here (1930 film) was another Warner Brothers First National picture from just a month before Song of the Flame. It stars Bernice Claire, Alexander Gray, and Inez Courtney like Song of the Flame. It is extant.

The Vagabond King is a full technicolor musical historical drama film from 1930, which was said to have similar crowd scenes to Song of The Flame. It remains fully extant.

== Gallery ==
Surviving media from the production
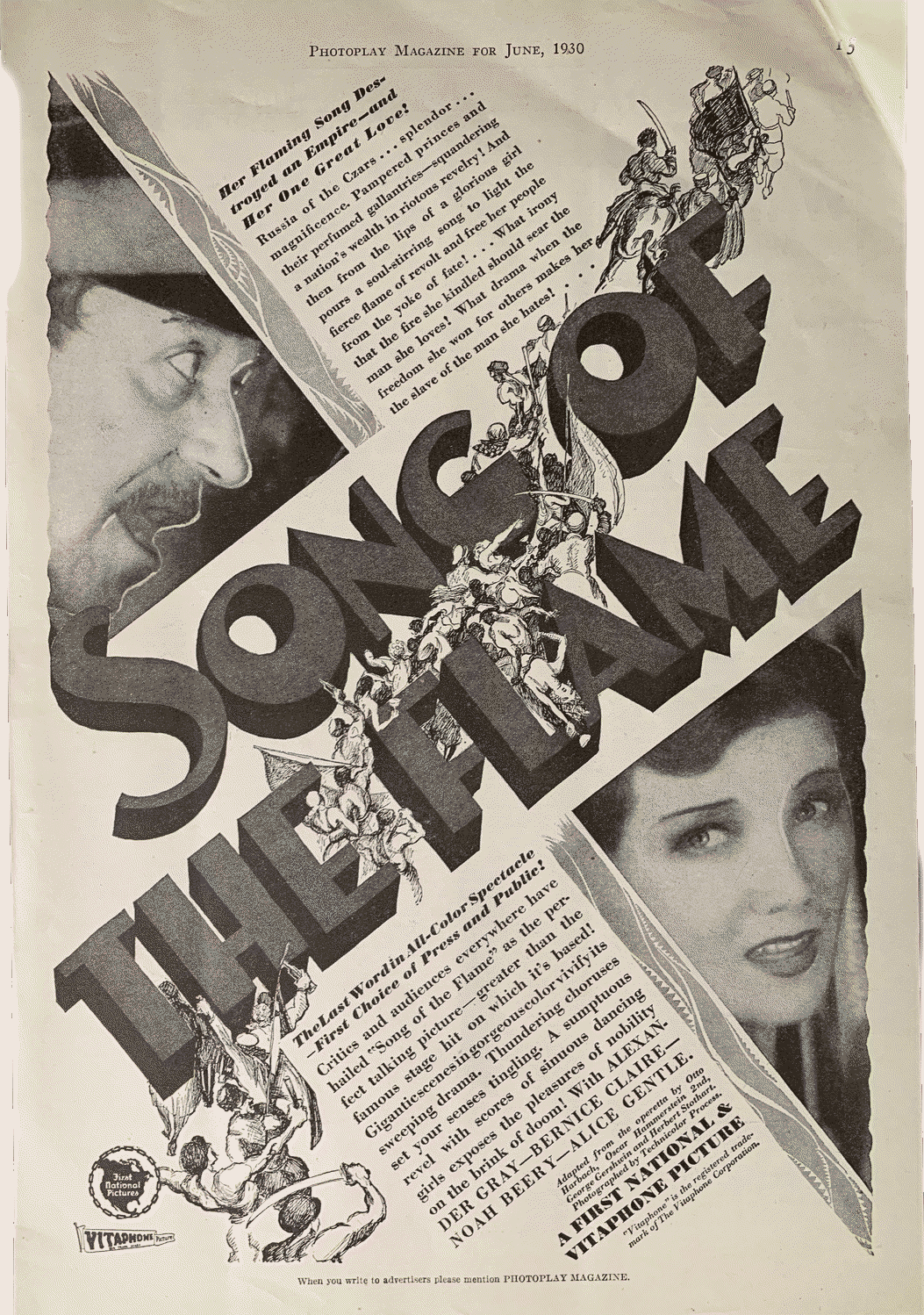
Film print ad for "Song of the Flame"

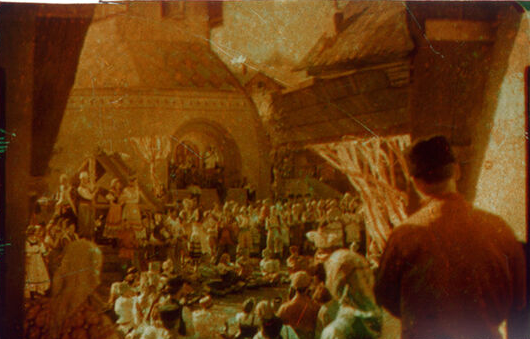
Suriviving Technicolor frame from the movie

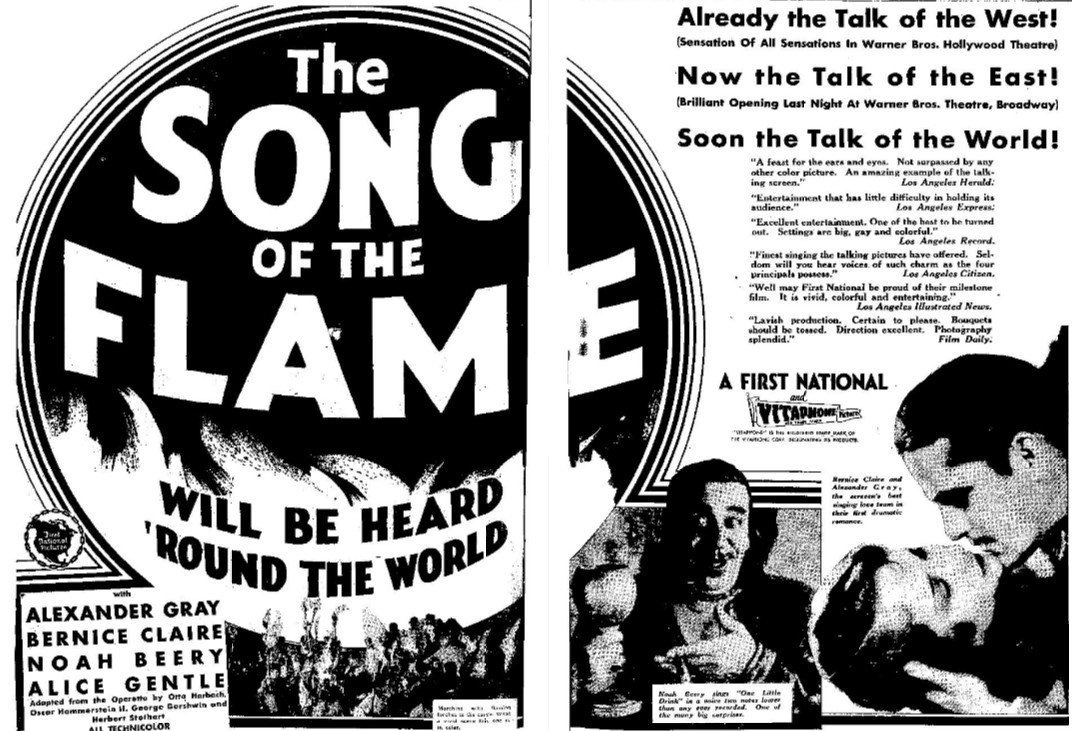
Advertisement for the film, May 7th, 1930

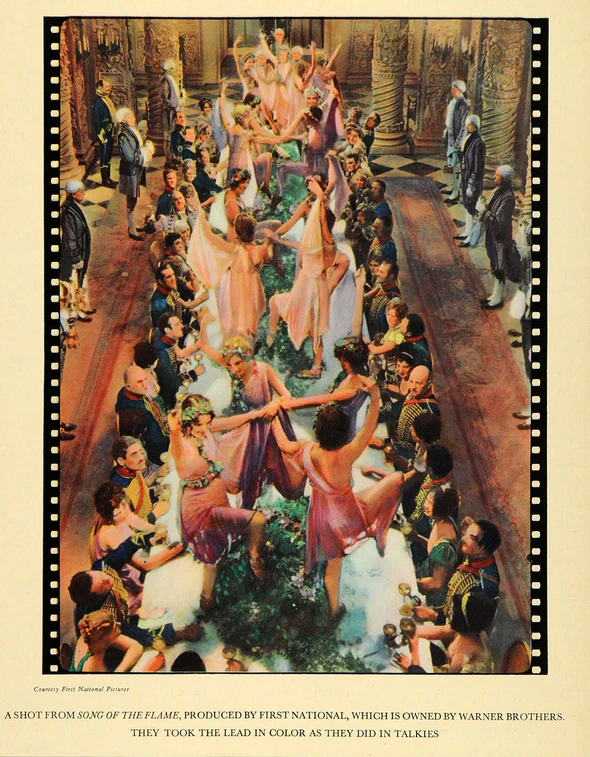
Shot from the film, showing off the Technicolor

== See also ==
- List of lost films
- List of incomplete or partially lost films
- List of early color feature films
