= Song of the Flame (song) =

1925 song

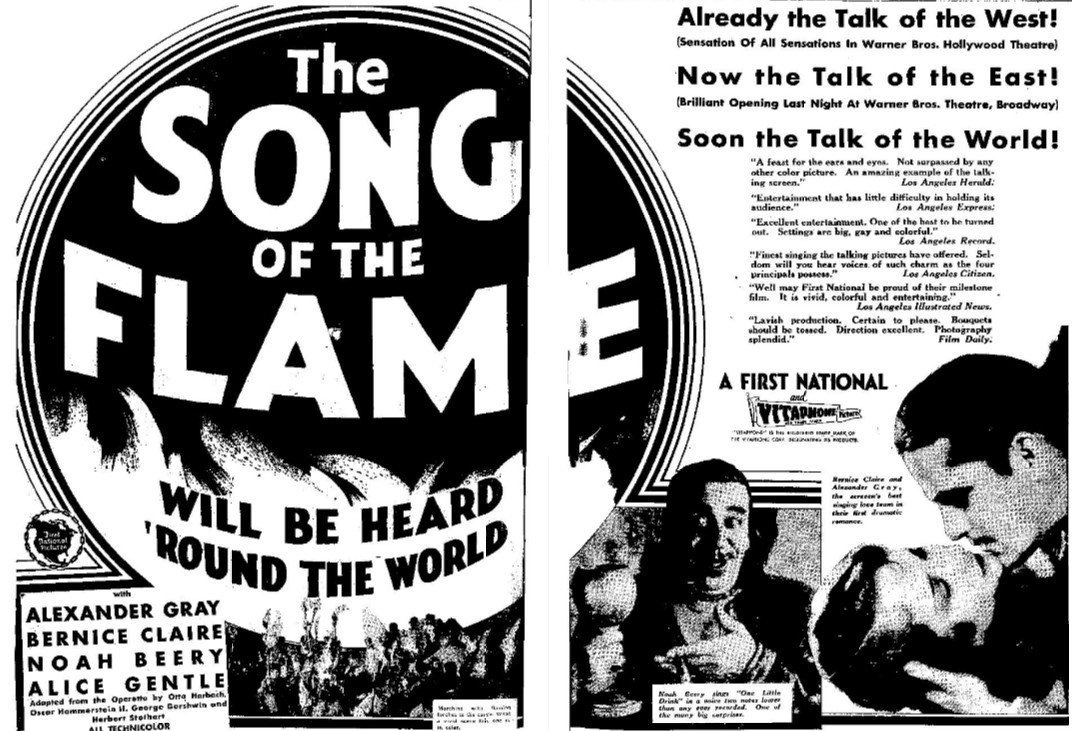
Advertisement for the film "Song of the Flame" (1930)

"Song of the Flame" is a popular song first published in 1925 for the operetta "Song of the Flame". It was written by Herbert P. Stothart and George Gershwin.

== Overview ==
In the play, the song serves the purpose as a uniting song for the revolutionaries during the Russian Revolution. It is created and sung by Anuita, nicknamed "The Flame", who is described as a Joan of Arc for the revolution in the story. The song is said to "Melt the snows that are chilling the hearts of Russia".

The "Song of the Flame" performed by Carl Fenton Orchestra, 1926.

It is most known for being in the film "Song of the Flame" which was an adaptation of the play. It released in May 1930. The film, while being lost, still has a considerable amount of its soundtrack intact, keeping many of the films versions of the song extant, including many performances of Bernice Claire, who played The Flame.

== Lyrics ==
The lyrics of Tessa Kostas 1926 version of the song.

Verse 1

Helpless children of the night,
Groping blindly for the light.
The flame of hope is near.

Chorus

What's that light that is beckoning?
Though the night it is beckoning.
Come, come, come, come, take your new day of reckoning.
What new fire is enthralling you?
Soul of Russia is calling you!
On, on, up the hill of hope and glory,
Follow follow the flame.

Chorus

What's that light that is beckoning?
Though the night it is beckoning.
Come, come, come, come, take your new day of reckoning.
What new fire is enthralling you?
Soul of Russia is calling you!
On, on, up the hill of hope and glory,
Follow follow the flame.

== Versions ==
On January 13, 1926, Robert Wolfe Kahn and His Orchestra released a version on Phonograph record Victor 19935. It is the earliest known audio recording of the song.

On January 27, 1926, the Ipana Troubadores released a version of the song, on Columbia record 565-D.

On February 4, 1926, the Victor Light Opera Company released a version of the song on Victor record 19954.

On February 5, 1926, the Jack Stillman Orchestra released the song on Phonograph record Edison 51696 and wax cylinder Edison 5139.

On February 8, 1926, Carl Fenton Orchestra released the song on Brunswick record 3033, Brunswick record 4808, and Vocalion record 15223.

In March 1926, the Casa Lopez Orchestra recorded a version on OKeh record 40586.

On March 26, 1926, actress Tessa Kosta, and the Russian Art Choir, who were a part of the operetta screenings in 1926 at the 44th Street Theatre, recorded a version of the song. Their recording was put onto Columbia record 618-D.

In May 1930, the film "Song of the Flame" released, which included renditions by Bernice Claire, who acted as Aniuta "The Flame".

On May 15, 1930, Finish singer Jukka Ahti released "Leimun laulu", a Finnish translation of Song of the Flame on Victor record V-4081.

Sometime around 1931, Guy Robertson played the song on the Foodtown Pops Revue radio station out of Chicago, Illinois. The radio station was owned by Foodtown Kitchens, Inc, and was used to advertise their cereals. The arrangement he played was created by the wife of H Leopold Spitalny, and included a part of a different song from the operetta, Cossack Love Song. Like Tessa Kosta, Guy was a prominent actor in the actual play, being the role of Prince Volodya.

In 1939, opera singer Lancing Hatfield recorded a version of the song. Notably, replacing the word "Russia" with "Freedom".

On July 14, 1939, Tony Martin released his version of the song. It was released on Decca record 2883, Coral record CB-20019, Decca record DL-8286, and in the U.K Brunswick record 02995.

Sometime in the 1940s or 1950s, Robert Trendler released his version of the song on Pilotone records.

Sometime in the 1950s or later, Song of the Flame was recorded as a part of the Seeburg 1000

In 2009, the song was played live by the Avalon String Band

On March 26, 2025, University of Michigan School of Music, Theatre & Dance performed this song with a live orchestra.
