= The Devil and Daniel Webster (disambiguation) =

"The Devil and Daniel Webster" is a 1937 short story by Stephen Vincent Benét.

The Devil and Daniel Webster may also refer to:

- The Devil and Daniel Webster (opera), a 1938 opera by Douglas Moore
- The Devil and Daniel Webster (film), an adaptation of Benet's story, starring Edward Arnold and Walter Huston

== See also ==
- The Devil and Daniel Mouse, a 1978 television special
- The Devil and Daniel Johnston, a 2005 documentary film
