= Alice Gentle =

American opera singer

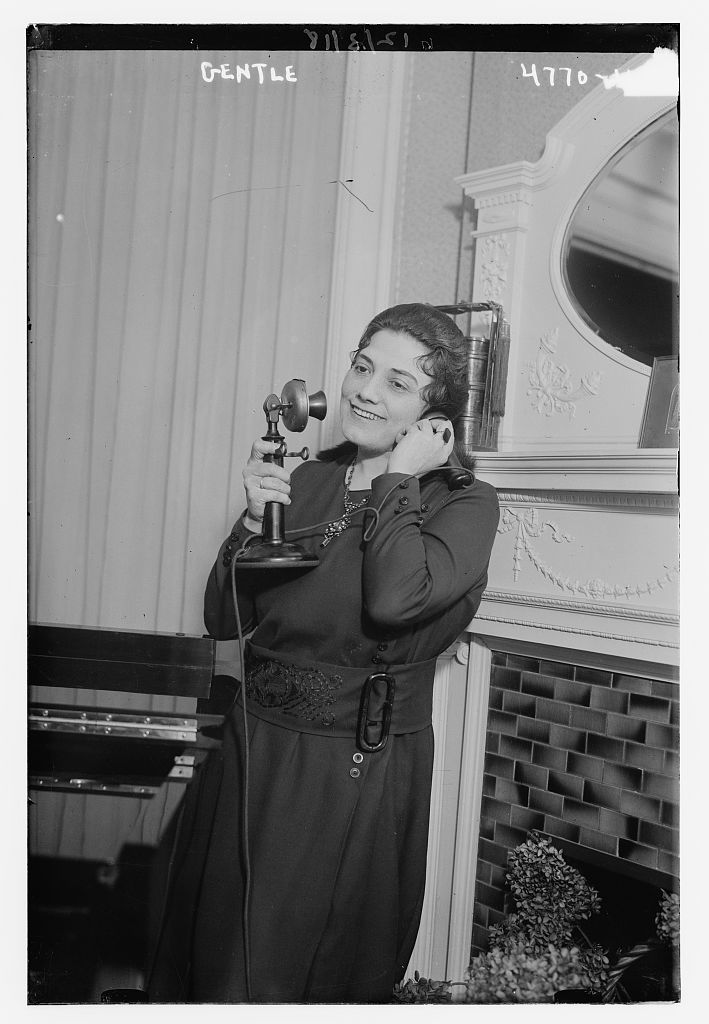
Alice Gentle in 1918 on the telephone

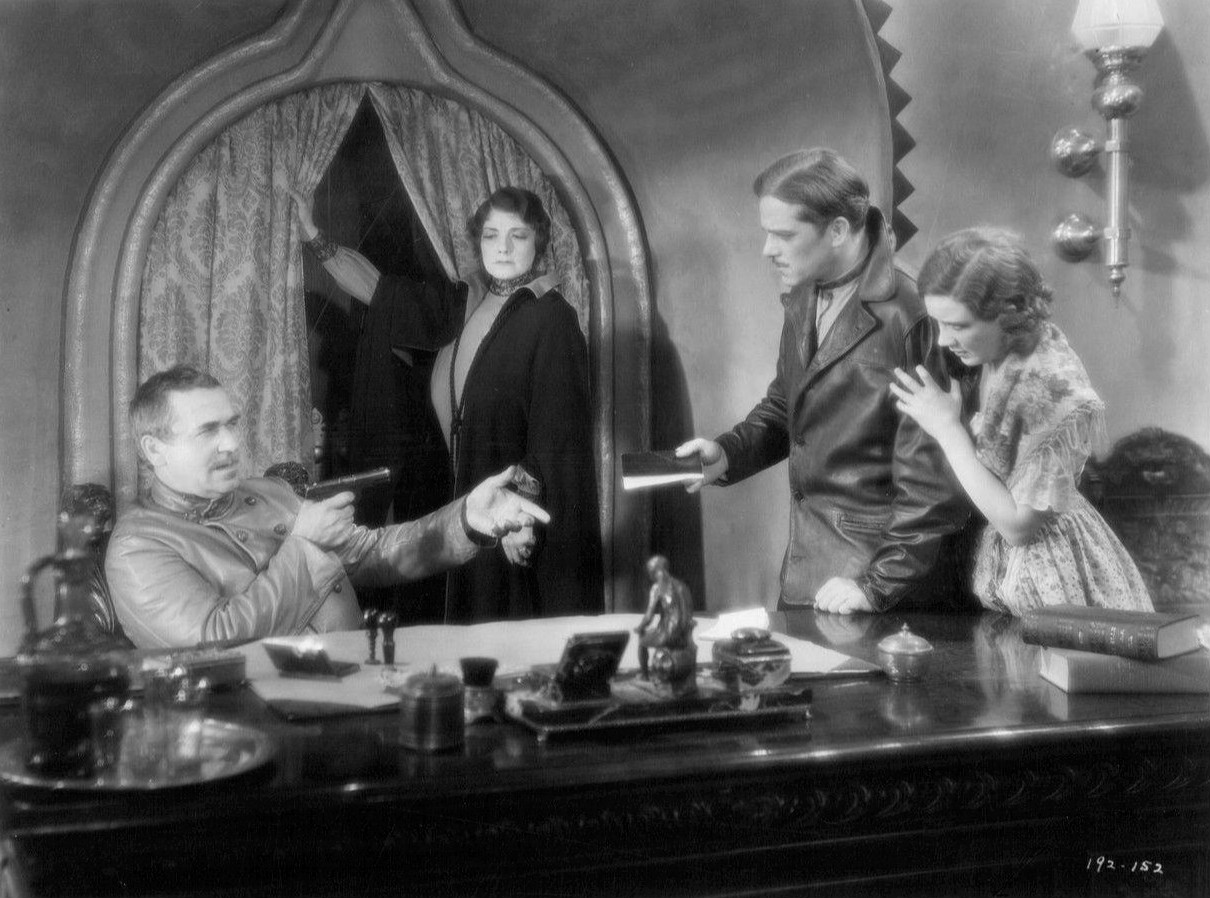
Gentle (second from left) in a scene from the 1930 film Song of the Flame.

Alice Gentle (née True, later Proebstel; June 30, 1877/1878 – February 28, 1958) was an American operatic mezzo-soprano.

== Biography ==
Alice True was born in Chatsworth, Illinois, the youngest of three children, all daughters, born to John and Emma Catherine (Shroyer) True. She appeared at the age of 2 in the 1880 United States Census for her family, indicating she was born in 1877 or 1878, although she would later shave years off her age, giving such years as 1885 and 1888.

She began her career in 1908 as a member of the opera chorus in Oscar Hammerstein I's Manhattan Opera Company (MOC). Impressed with Gentle's talents, Hammerstein began casting her in secondary roles in MOC productions in 1909, beginning with the role of Mercédès in Georges Bizet's Carmen. She sang roles with the MOC and with Hammerstein's Philadelphia Opera Company through 1910; including Emilia in Otello, the First maid in Elektra, Flora in La traviata, Lola in Cavalleria rusticana, Maddalena in Rigoletto, Nicklausse in The Tales of Hoffmann, and Siébel in Faust among others.

Gentle also performed in two Broadway musicals, The Opera Ball (1912) and All for the Ladies (1912-1913).

In 1916, she portrayed Federico in Ambroise Thomas's Mignon at La Scala in Milan. She sang one season at the Metropolitan Opera, making her debut with the company in 1918 as Preziosilla in La forza del destino. Later that year, she created the role of Frugola in the world premiere of Puccini's Il Tabarro. Her only other role at the Met was Fatima in Oberon in 1919. In 1923, she toured the United States as Carmen with the San Carlo Opera Company. She appeared in three films during the early 1930s: Song of the Flame (1930), Golden Dawn (1930), and Flying Down to Rio (1933). In 1940, she made her final stage appearance at the Los Angeles Civic Light Opera as Mrs. Cripps in H.M.S. Pinafore.

She died on February 28, 1958, in Oakland, California. She was survived by her son, actor Bruce MacFarlane (né Bruce MacFarlane Gentle).
