= The Booze Hangs High =

1930 film

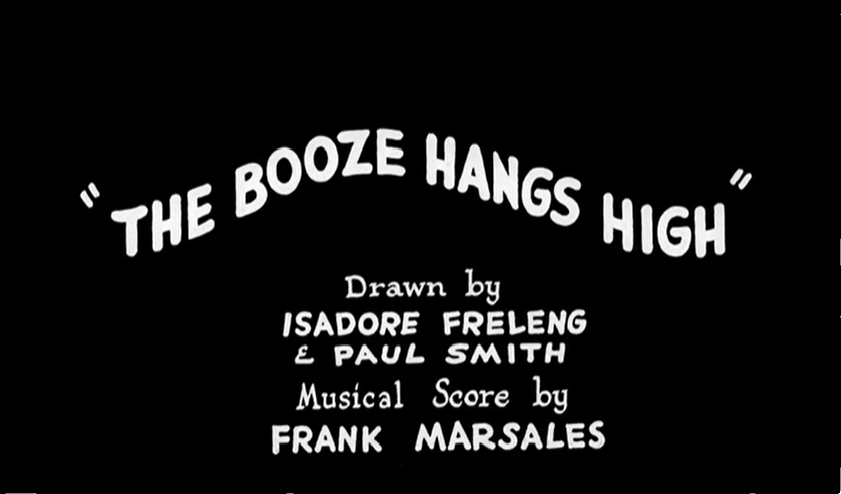
- Title card
- Directed by: Hugh Harman; Rudolf Ising
- Produced by: Hugh Harman; Rudolf Ising
- Music by: Frank Marsales
- Animation by: Isadore Freleng; Paul J. Smith
- Color process: Black-and-white
- Production company: Harman-Ising Productions
- Distributed by: Warner Bros. Pictures; The Vitaphone Corporation
- Release date: September 20, 1930; (earliest known date)
- Running time: 6:09
- Country: United States
- Language: English

The Booze Hangs High is a 1930 American animated comedy short film directed by Hugh Harman and Rudolf Ising. It is the fourth film in the Looney Tunes series featuring Bosko. It was released as early as September 20, 1930, although it was screened by as early as September 9, 1930. (Note: Archived from a September 26 article. However, based on the Variety review, the short likely premiered on September 6, since new cartoon shorts would premiere in theaters on Saturdays.)

== Plot ==
Full short

The film opens with a close-up shot of a cow's rear end. She moos as she walks away, tail and udders swaying in time to The Goose Hangs High, a song from the film Song of the Flame, which the short is parodying. Bosko appears and does a Mexican-style dance with the cow. At one point, the cow's "pants" drop, revealing polka-dotted underwear. Bosko humiliates and angers the cow, who walks away while Bosko and a horse laugh at this sight. He then climbs onto the horse carriage and uses a whip to play the horse's tail like a cello, "tuning" the horse by twisting his ear. The horse enjoys the music while walking in an odd fashion. Bosko then takes a pitchfork and starts playing it like a banjo.

The scene cuts to three ducklings and their mother. Whilst walking in single file, they start bouncing on their rears in tune to the music. The mother duck starts to sway and the ducklings follow her lead. One of the ducklings, crosses its legs and whispers something in the mother duck's ear. She undoes a flap on his rear, as if he was wearing pants, and motions him off screen, presumably to relieve himself. When he returns, she replaces the flap and they all jump into a pond.

Bosko and the horse continue dancing, eventually sliding down the horse's neck to feed three hungry pigs. He tilts a trash can into their trough, and they eat greedily. One of the piglets finds a bottle of booze and tries to loosen the cork. Eventually, he manages to open it using the other piglet's tail as a corkscrew. Bubbles begin to float out, and the piglets pop them merrily, making xylophone-like sounds that play How Dry I Am. They start drinking it and soon get drunk. Their father comes over, startled by their drunkenness, but nevertheless starts drinking from the bottle too. He drunkenly sings a butchered version of One Little Drink. He disposes of the bottle, which shatters against Bosko's head, causing him to be inebriated. He walks over to the pigs and they sing Sweet Adeline together, barbershop style. The father pig launches into One Little Drink again, but the effort causes him to belch up a corn cob. Looking embarrassed, he uses his belly button like a knob to open the door to his stomach and puts the cob back inside. Bosko continues singing and dancing with the pigs.

== Production ==
This cartoon opens when the blackness of the title card becomes the back of a cow's udder, as it did in Plane Crazy (a Mickey Mouse cartoon which Harman and Ising worked on) and the lost musical operetta film Song of the Flame. The latter features a song titled The Goose Hangs High from which this short gets its name. Noah Beery's role in the film is also parodied in this short, including a song he sang called "One Little Drink".

== Reception ==
Variety reviewed the film on September 9, 1930: "Funny piece built around the song, 'The Goose Hangs High', and latter's amusing lyrics that offer adaptation to the cartoon with good effect. Can be used anywhere for filler... The music and the rhythm plus the synchronous voices make the subject entertaining."

However, the October 4, 1930 review in Motion Picture News was less kind: "Production value of this one rates high, but entertainment value is lowered because of the absence of originality in gags — a trait predominating in most of the cartoons of the current age. Here and there, we find in this Looney Tune a clever twist, easily recognized from the cut-and-tried material depended upon for laughs. Audience reaction was favorable."

== Home media ==
The Booze Hangs High is available on disc 3 of the Looney Tunes Golden Collection: Volume 6 DVD set.

== See also ==
- List of animated films in the public domain in the United States
