= Two Hearts in Harmony =

1935 film by William Beaudine

- Opening titles
- Directed by: William Beaudine
- Screenplay by: Robert Edmunds; A.R. Rawlinson
- Story by: Samuel Gibson Browne
- Produced by: John Clein
- Starring: Bernice Claire; George Curzon; Enid Stamp-Taylor
- Production company: Shepperton Studios
- Release date: 11 May 1936
- Running time: 75 minutes
- Country: United Kingdom
- Language: English

Two Hearts in Harmony is a 1935 British musical comedy drama film directed by William Beaudine and starring Bernice Claire, George Curzon and Enid Stamp-Taylor. It was written by Robert Edmunds and A.R. Rawlinson as an adaptation of a story by Samuel Gibson Browne.

== Preservation status ==
The British Film Institute National Archive holds a collection of stills but no film or video materials.

== Plot ==
Cabaret singer Micky dislikes the attention of her boss Calvazzi, and looks for other work. She is mistakenly sent to Lord Sheldon, a widower, who wants a governess for his young son Bobby. Micky gets the job, but out of kindness to Calvazzi she secretly continues to do some work at the cabaret. When Sheldon's jealous and scheming fiancée Sheila becomes increasingly unhappy with the situation, Sheldon drops her and finds romance with Micky.

== Cast ==
- Bernice Claire as Micky
- George Curzon as Lord Sheldon
- Enid Stamp-Taylor as Sheila
- Nora Williams as Lil
- Gordon Little as Joe
- Guy Middleton as Mario
- Paul Hartley as Bobby
- Eliot Makeham as Wagstaff
- Julian Royce as Carstairs
- Jack Harris and his band as themselves
- Sheila Barrett as Dodo
- Rex Curtis as Butler
- Victor Rietti as Calvazzi
- Betty Thumbling as Pam

== Reception ==
The Monthly Film Bulletin wrote: "This comedy drama, in spite of its banal title, has flashes of real interest. ... The production contains a delightful puppet show, some good singing from Bernice Claire, and some severe tilts at the refined education of Lord Sheldon's son, Bobby, and at the night-club habits of his aristocratic father. ... William Beaudine contributes some nice directoral touches, but some of the scenes are too long nor has the script provided sufficient material to link them. This, aggravated by ragged cutting, in turn bears hardly on the less mature actors, though it allows a player like Eliot Makeham to make much of a single scene. A pleasingly contrived film with some deeper value."

Kine Weekly wrote: "Musical romance, a simple excursion into the realms of modern make-believe, into which is dovetailed such popular elements as a pretty love interest, sly comedy, tuneful songs and agreeable juvenile sentiment. In spite of its flimsy texture, the varied menu manages to fill an hour or so quite pleasantly. ... Bernice Claire makes a promising English screen debut as Micky; she has personal charm, a sense of humour, and a singing voice of more than average quality. George Curzon easily adapts his talents to the quixolic role of Sheldon, and Paul Hartley is likeable as the shrewd and understanding Bobby."
