= Numbered Men =

1930 film by Mervyn LeRoy

- Lobby card
- Directed by: Mervyn LeRoy
- Written by: Play: Dwight Taylor; Screenplay: Alfred A. Cohn; Henry McCarty
- Starring: Bernice Claire; Conrad Nagel; Raymond Hackett; Ralph Ince
- Cinematography: Sol Polito
- Edited by: Terry O. Morse
- Music by: Leo F. Forbstein
- Production company: First National Pictures
- Distributed by: Warner Bros. Pictures
- Release date: August 6, 1930 (U.S.)
- Running time: 70 minutes
- Country: United States
- Language: English

Numbered Men is a 1930 American pre-Code prison drama film (originally with songs) produced and released by First National Pictures, a subsidiary of Warner Bros. Pictures, and directed by Mervyn LeRoy. The movie stars Bernice Claire, Conrad Nagel, Raymond Hackett and Ralph Ince. The film was based on the play entitled Jail Break by Dwight Taylor.

== Plot ==
Bertie "Duke" Gray is a counterfeiter who has been sentenced to prison for ten years. Seeing that there is no chance to escape, he accepts his fate and settles into prison life. Gray's friend Bud Leonard, a young man who cannot tolerate prison because he is in love with Mary Dane and misses her terribly. While Bud is in prison, Lou Rinaldo, the man who framed him, is pursuing Mary romantically. When Mary tempts Bud to escape, he is ready to take the risk although it may mean his death. The two plan to meet each other when Bud discloses that he is being sent to work on a road gang. Mary takes a job at a farmhouse where the convicts usually eat, hoping to see Bud there. Rinaldo traces her to the house and schemes to eliminate Bud so that he can have Mary to himself. Rinaldo convinces Bud and prisoner King Callahan, whom Rinaldo had framed, that they should attempt to escape, hoping that he can cause them to be caught in the attempt. Mary prevents Bud's escape but Callahan takes the bait. Callahan later shoots Rinaldo and is himself killed. To save Bud, who is scheduled to be released soon, Gray informs on Rinaldo, although the evidence that he provides will lead to an additional prison term for him. Gray is happy to make the sacrifice, knowing that Mary will be with the man whom she truly loves.

== Cast ==
- Bernice Claire as Mary Dane
- Conrad Nagel as 26521 (Bertie "Duke" Gray)
- Raymond Hackett as 31857 (Bud Leonard)
- Ralph Ince as 33410 ("King Callahan")
- Ivan Linow as 41226 ("Babyface")
- George Cooper as 27635 ("Happy Howard")
- Fred Howard as 50134 (Jimmy Martin)
- Tully Marshall as Lemuel Barnes
- Maurice Black as Lou Rinaldo
- Blanche Friderici as Mrs. Miller

== Music ==
Although music was mentioned when the film was in production and first previewed, ads and reviews soon mentioned that although Bernice Claire was primarily a musical comedy star, there would be no singing in the film, perhaps in response to the public's waning desire for musical films. Current existing prints of Numbered Men are missing at least five minutes of film containing musical sequences. The complete musical film was released intact in countries outside the U.S. where a backlash against musicals never occurred. It is unknown whether a copy of this full version still exists.

== Reception ==
In a contemporary review for The New York Times, critic Mordaunt Hall called the film a "ruddy melodrama" and "a strange affair with odd lots of dialogue and prison scenes that call to mind a club of the free."

== Preservation ==
The film survives only in the edited version that was released in late 1930 by Warner Bros., with the musical sections removed. This version has been broadcast on television.
