= Technicolor =

Color motion picture process

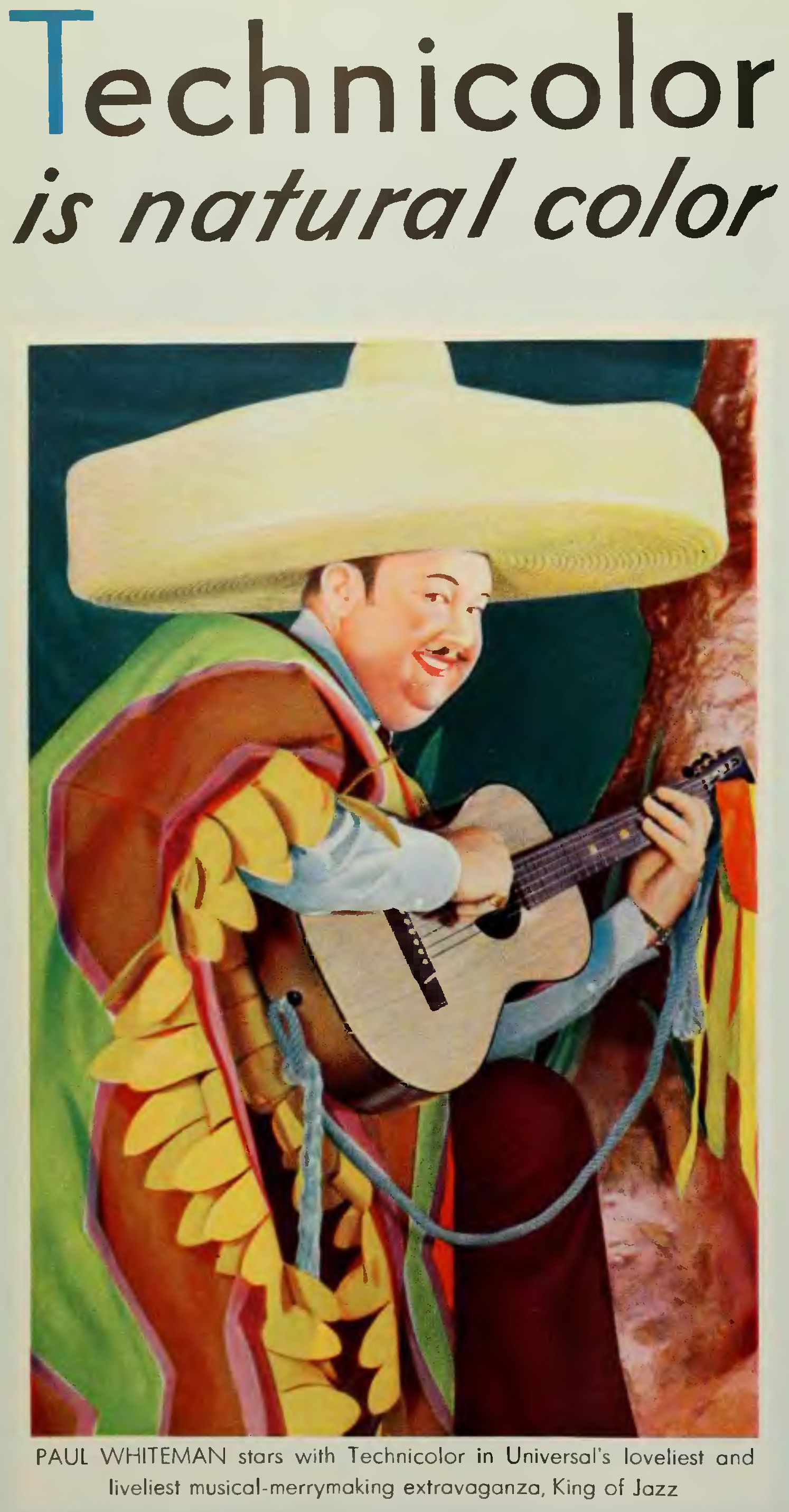
"Technicolor is natural color" Paul Whiteman stars in an ad for his film King of Jazz from The Film Daily, 1930

Technicolor is a family of color motion picture processes. The first version, Process 1, was introduced in 1916, and improved versions followed over several decades.

Definitive Technicolor movies using three black-and-white films running through a special camera (Three-strip Technicolor or Process 4) started in the early 1930s and continued through to the mid-1950s, when the three-strip camera was replaced by a standard camera loaded with single-strip "monopack" color negative film. Technicolor Laboratories were still able to produce Technicolor prints by creating three black-and-white matrices from the Eastmancolor negative (Process 5).

Process 4 was the second major color process, after Britain's Kinemacolor (used between 1909 and 1915), and the most widely used color process in Hollywood during the Golden Age of Hollywood. Technicolor's three-color process became known and celebrated for its highly saturated color, and was initially most commonly used for filming musicals such as The Wizard of Oz (1939), Down Argentine Way (1940), and Meet Me in St. Louis (1944), costume pictures such as The Adventures of Robin Hood (1938) and Gone with the Wind (1939), the film Blue Lagoon (1949), and animated films such as Snow White and the Seven Dwarfs (1937), Gulliver's Travels (1939), Pinocchio (1940), and Fantasia (1940). As the technology matured, it was also used for less spectacular dramas and comedies. Occasionally, even films noir – such as Leave Her to Heaven (1945) and Niagara (1953) – were filmed in Technicolor.

The "Tech" in the company's name was inspired by the Massachusetts Institute of Technology, where Herbert Kalmus and Daniel Frost Comstock received their undergraduate degrees in 1904 and were later instructors.

== Nomenclature ==
The term "Technicolor" has been used historically for at least five concepts:

- Technicolor: an umbrella company (Technicolor Motion Picture Corporation) encompassing all versions and ancillary services (1914–2025, most recently Technicolor Group).
- Technicolor labs: a group of film laboratories worldwide, owned and run by Technicolor for post-production services including developing, printing, and transferring films in all major color film processes, as well as Technicolor's proprietary ones (1922–present).
- Technicolor process or format: several custom imaging systems used in film production, culminating in the "three-strip" process in 1932 (1917–1955).
- Technicolor IB printing ("IB" abbreviates "imbibition", a dye-transfer operation): a process for making color motion picture prints that allows the use of dyes that are more stable and permanent than those formed in ordinary chromogenic color printing. Originally used for printing from color-separation negatives photographed on black-and-white film in a special Technicolor camera (1928–2002, with differing gaps of availability after 1974, depending on the lab).
- Prints or Color by Technicolor: used since 1954, when Eastmancolor (and other single-strip color film stocks) supplanted the three-film-strip camera negative method, while the Technicolor IB printing process continued to be used as one method of making the prints. This connotation applies to nearly all films made from 1954 onward in which Technicolor is named in the credits (1953–present).

== Company history ==
Both Kalmus and Comstock went to Switzerland to earn PhD degrees; Kalmus at University of Zurich, and Comstock at Basel in 1906.

In 1912, Kalmus, Comstock, and mechanic W. Burton Wescott formed Kalmus, Comstock, and Wescott, an industrial research and development firm. Most of the early patents were taken out by Comstock and Wescott, while Kalmus served primarily as the company's president and chief executive officer.

When the firm was hired to analyze an inventor's flicker-free motion picture system, they became intrigued with the art and science of filmmaking, particularly color motion picture processes, leading to the founding of Technicolor in Boston in 1914 and incorporation in Maine in 1915.

In 1921, Wescott left the company; the same year, Technicolor Inc. was chartered in Delaware.

In 1966, the company created a division known as Vidtronics, which developed a system used in the late 1960s and early 1970s that allowed experimenting with video gear and videotape to make ads and feature-length motion pictures by transferring the videotape to film for final release and distribution. Films made with this process were the 1973 film Why, the 1971 film The Resurrection of Zachary Wheeler, and the most famous film using this process, Frank Zappa's 1971 film 200 Motels, which was originally shot on 2 inch quadruplex videotape, and then transferred to film by Technicolor, being the first independent film originally to be shot on videotape and distributed theatrically in 35 mm.

== Color process history ==
=== Two-color Technicolor ===
==== Process 1 ====
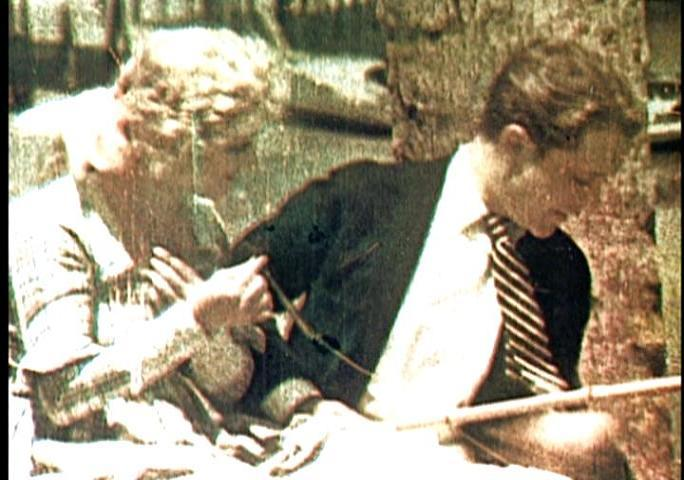
A frame from a surviving fragment of The Gulf Between (1917), the first publicly shown Technicolor film

Technicolor originally existed in a two-color (red and green) system. In Process 1 (1916), a prism beam-splitter behind the camera lens exposed two consecutive frames of a single strip of black-and-white negative film simultaneously, one behind a red filter, the other behind a green filter. Because two frames were being exposed at the same time, the film had to be photographed and projected at twice the normal speed. Exhibition required a special projector with two apertures (one with a red filter and the other with a green filter), two lenses, and an adjustable prism that aligned the two images on the screen.

The results were first demonstrated to members of the American Institute of Mining Engineers in New York on February 21, 1917. Technicolor itself produced the only movie made in Process 1, The Gulf Between, which had a limited tour of Eastern cities, beginning with Boston and New York on September 13, 1917, primarily to interest motion picture producers and exhibitors in color. The near-constant need for a technician to adjust the projection alignment doomed this additive color process. Only a few frames of The Gulf Between, showing star Grace Darmond, are known to exist today.

==== Process 2 ====
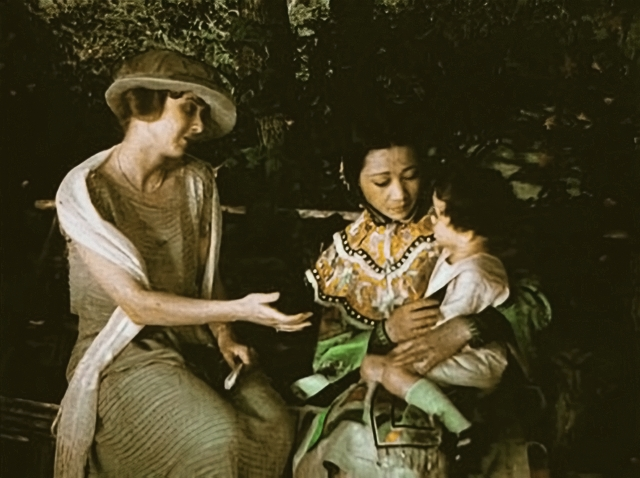
A frame from The Toll of the Sea (1922), the first generally released Technicolor film, and the first to use a two-strip subtractive color process

Convinced that there was no future in additive color processes, Comstock, Wescott, and Kalmus focused their attention on subtractive color processes. This culminated in what would eventually be known as Process 2 (1922) (often referred to today by the misnomer "two-strip Technicolor"). As before, the special Technicolor camera used a beam-splitter that simultaneously exposed two consecutive frames of a single strip of black-and-white film, one behind a green filter and one behind a red filter.

The difference was that the two-component negative was now used to produce a subtractive color print. Because the colors were physically present in the print, no special projection equipment was required and the correct registration of the two images did not depend on the skill of the projectionist.

The frames exposed behind the green filter were printed on one strip of black-and-white film, and the frames exposed behind the red filter were printed on another strip. After development, each print was toned to a color nearly complementary to that of the filter: orange-red for the green-filtered images, cyan-green for the red-filtered ones. Unlike tinting, which adds a uniform veil of color to the entire image, toning chemically replaces the black-and-white silver image with transparent coloring matter, so that the highlights remain clear (or nearly so), dark areas are strongly colored, and intermediate tones are colored proportionally.

The two prints, made on film stock half the thickness of regular film, were then cemented together back to back to create a projection print. The Toll of the Sea, which debuted on November 26, 1922, used Process 2 and was the first general-release film in Technicolor.

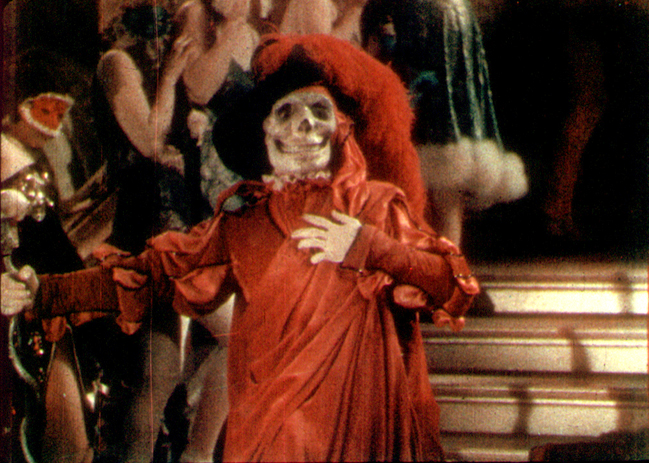
A frame enlargement of a Technicolor segment from The Phantom of the Opera (1925). The film was one of the earliest uses of the process on interior sets, and demonstrated its versatility.

The second all-color feature in Process 2 Technicolor, Wanderer of the Wasteland, was released in 1924. Process 2 was also used for color sequences in such major motion pictures as The Ten Commandments (1923), The Phantom of the Opera (1925), and Ben-Hur (1925). Douglas Fairbanks' The Black Pirate (1926) was the third all-color Process 2 feature.

Although successful commercially, Process 2 was plagued with technical problems. Because the images on the two sides of the print were not in the same plane, both could not be perfectly in focus at the same time. The significance of this depended on the depth of focus of the projection optics. Much more serious was a problem with cupping. Films in general tended to become somewhat cupped after repeated use: every time a film was projected, each frame in turn was heated by the intense light in the projection gate, causing it to bulge slightly; after it had passed through the gate, it cooled and the bulge subsided, but not quite completely.

It was found that the cemented prints were not only very prone to cupping, but that the direction of cupping would suddenly and randomly change from back to front or vice versa, so that even the most attentive projectionist could not prevent the image from temporarily popping out of focus whenever the cupping direction changed. Technicolor had to supply new prints so the cupped ones could be shipped to their Boston laboratory for flattening, after which they could be put back into service, at least for a while.

The presence of image layers on both surfaces made the prints especially vulnerable to scratching, and because the scratches were vividly colored they were very noticeable. Splicing a Process 2 print without special attention to its unusual laminated construction was apt to result in a weak splice that would fail as it passed through the projector. Even before these problems became apparent, Technicolor regarded this cemented print approach as a stopgap and was already at work developing an improved process.

==== Process 3 ====
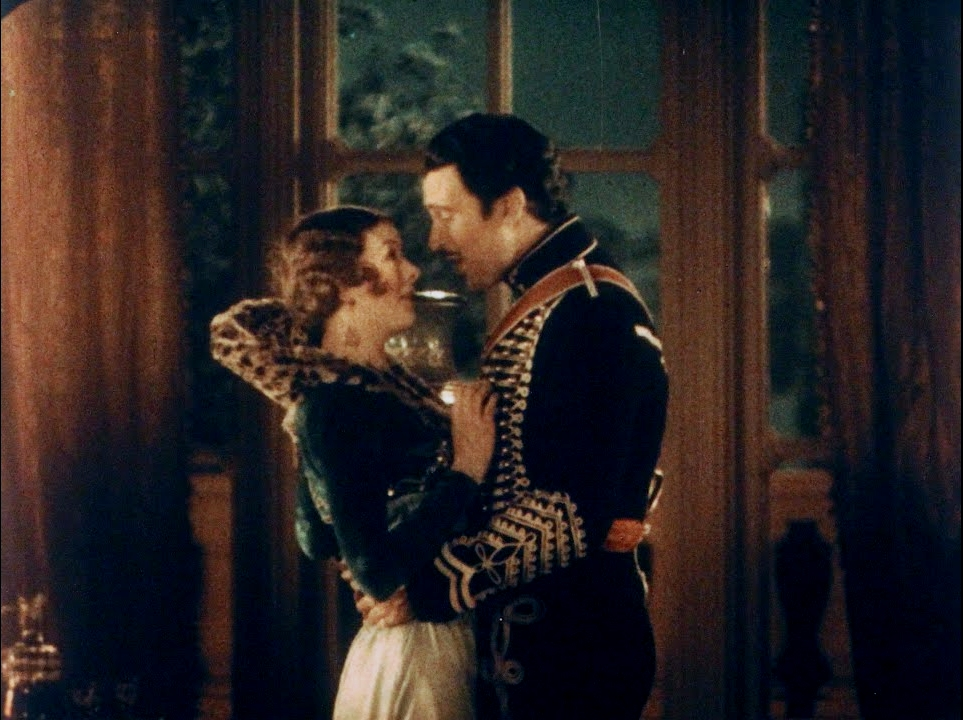
Example of Process 3 Technicolor. Myrna Loy and Walter Pidgeon in Bride of the Regiment (1930)

Based on the same dye-transfer technique first applied to motion pictures in 1916 by Max Handschiegl, Technicolor Process 3 (1928) was developed to eliminate the projection print made of double-cemented prints in favor of a print created by dye imbibition. The Technicolor camera for Process 3 was identical to that for Process 2, simultaneously photographing two consecutive frames of a black-and-white film behind red and green filters.

In the lab, skip-frame printing was used to sort the alternating color-record frames on the camera negative into two series of contiguous frames, the red-filtered frames being printed onto one strip of specially prepared "matrix" film and the green-filtered frames onto another. After processing, the gelatin of the matrix film's emulsion was left proportionally hardened, being hardest and least soluble where it had been most strongly exposed to light. The unhardened fraction was then washed away. The result was two strips of relief images consisting of hardened gelatin, thickest in the areas corresponding to the clearest, least-exposed areas of the negative.

To make each final color print, the matrix films were soaked in dye baths of colors nominally complementary to those of the camera filters: the strip made from red-filtered frames was dyed cyan-green and the strip made from green-filtered frames was dyed orange-red. The thicker the gelatin in each area of a frame, the more dye it absorbed. Subtle scene-to-scene color control was managed by partial wash-back of the dyes from each matrix. Each matrix in turn was pressed into contact with a plain gelatin-coated strip of film known as the "blank" and the gelatin "imbibed" the dye from the matrix. A mordant made from deacetylated chitin was applied to the blank before printing, to prevent the dyes from migrating or "bleeding" after they were absorbed.

Dye imbibition was not suitable for printing optical soundtracks, which required very high resolution, so when making prints for sound-on-film systems the "blank" film was a conventional black-and-white film stock on which the soundtrack, as well as frame lines, had been printed in the ordinary way prior to the dye transfer operation.

The first feature made entirely in the Technicolor Process 3 was The Viking (1928), which had a synchronized score and sound effects. Redskin (1929), with a synchronized score, and The Mysterious Island (1929), a part-talkie, were photographed almost entirely in this process also but included some sequences in black and white. The following talkies were made entirely – or almost entirely – in Technicolor Process 3: On with the Show! (1929) (the first all-talking color feature), Gold Diggers of Broadway (1929), The Show of Shows (1929), Sally (1929), The Vagabond King (1930), Follow Thru (1930), Golden Dawn (1930), Hold Everything (1930), The Rogue Song (1930), Song of the Flame (1930), Song of the West (1930), The Life of the Party (1930), Sweet Kitty Bellairs (1930), Bride of the Regiment (1930), Mamba (1930), Whoopee! (1930), King of Jazz (1930), Under a Texas Moon (1930), Bright Lights (1930), Viennese Nights (1930), Woman Hungry (1931), Kiss Me Again (1931) and 50 Million Frenchmen (1931).

In addition, many feature films were released with Technicolor sequences. Numerous short subjects were also photographed in Technicolor Process 3, including the first color sound cartoons by producers such as Ub Iwerks and Walter Lantz. Song of the Flame became the first color movie to use a widescreen process (using a system known as Vitascope, which used 65mm film).

In 1931, an improvement of Technicolor Process 3 was developed that removed grain from the Technicolor film, resulting in more vivid and vibrant colors. This process was first used on a Radio Picture entitled The Runaround (1931). The new process not only improved the color but also removed specks (that looked like bugs) from the screen, which had previously blurred outlines and lowered visibility. This new improvement along with a reduction in cost (from 8.85 cents to 7 cents per foot) led to a new color revival.

Warner Bros. Pictures took the lead once again by producing three features (out of an announced plan for six features): Manhattan Parade (1932), Doctor X (1932) and Mystery of the Wax Museum (1933). Radio Pictures followed by announcing plans to make four more features in the new process. Only one of these, Fanny Foley Herself (1931), was actually produced. Although Paramount Pictures announced plans to make eight features and Metro-Goldwyn-Mayer promised two color features, these never materialized. This may have been the result of the lukewarm reception to these new color pictures by the public. Two independently produced features were also made with this improved Technicolor process: Legong: Dance of the Virgins (1934) and Kliou the Tiger (1935).

Very few of the original camera negatives of movies made in Technicolor Process 2 or 3 survive. In the late 1940s, most were discarded from storage at Technicolor in a space-clearing move, after the studios declined to reclaim the materials. Original Technicolor prints that survived into the 1950s were often used to make black-and-white prints for television and simply discarded thereafter. This explains why so many early color films exist today solely in black and white. Warner Bros., which had vaulted from a minor exhibitor to a major studio with its introduction of the talkies, incorporated Technicolor's printing to enhance its films. Other producers followed Warner Bros.' example by making features in color, with either Technicolor, or one of its competitors, such as Brewster Color and Multicolor (later Cinecolor). Consequently, the introduction of color did not increase the number of moviegoers to the point where it was economic. This and the Great Depression severely strained the finances of the movie studios and spelled the end of Technicolor's first financial successes.

=== Three-strip Technicolor ===
==== Process 4: Development and introduction ====
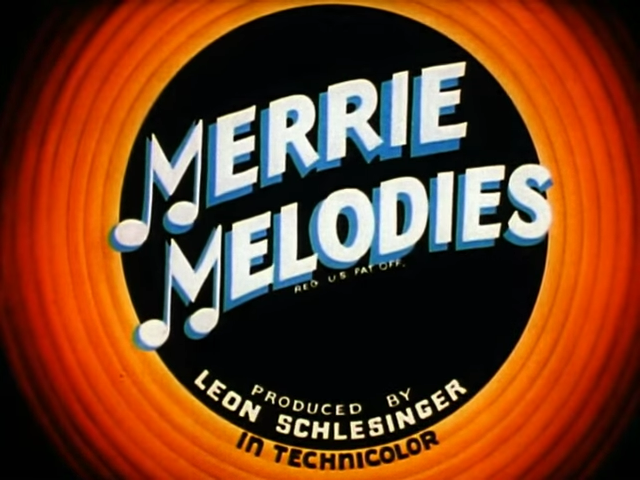
The intro card for late 1930s Warner Bros. Merrie Melodies cartoons with a "In Technicolor" credit. Many animation companies during the 1930s and 1940s used Technicolor for their cartoon shorts.

Technicolor envisioned a full-color process as early as 1924, and was actively developing such a process by 1929. Hollywood made so much use of Technicolor in 1929 and 1930 that many believed the feature film industry would soon be turning out color films exclusively. By 1931, however, the Great Depression had taken its toll on the film industry, which began to cut back on expenses. The production of color films had decreased dramatically by 1932, when Burton Wescott and Joseph A. Ball completed work on a new three-color movie camera.

Technicolor could now promise studios a full range of colors, as opposed to the limited red–green spectrum of previous films. The new camera simultaneously exposed three strips of black-and-white film, each of which recorded a different color of the spectrum. The new process would last until the last Technicolor feature film was produced in 1955.

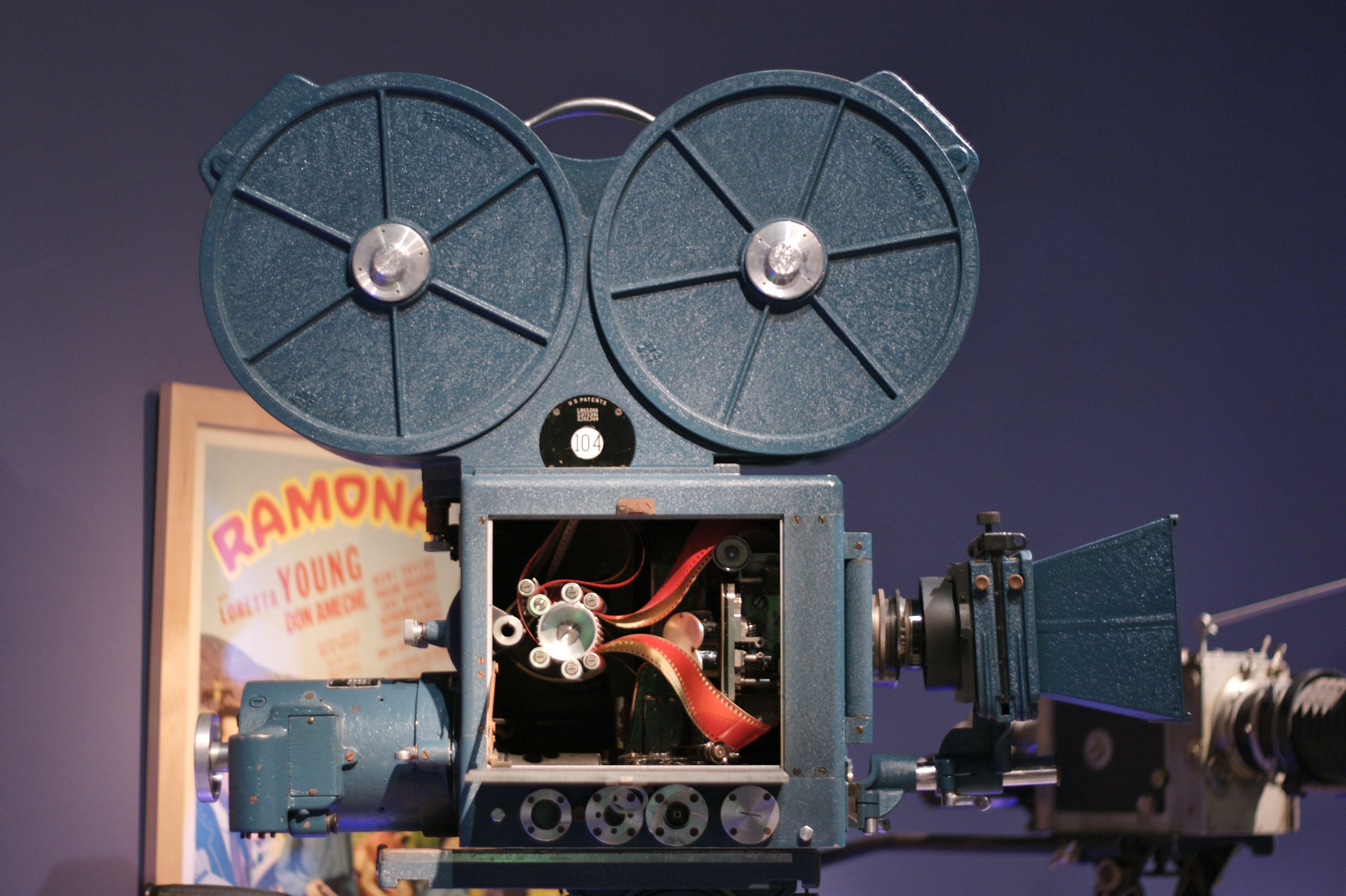
A Three-strip Technicolor camera from the 1930s

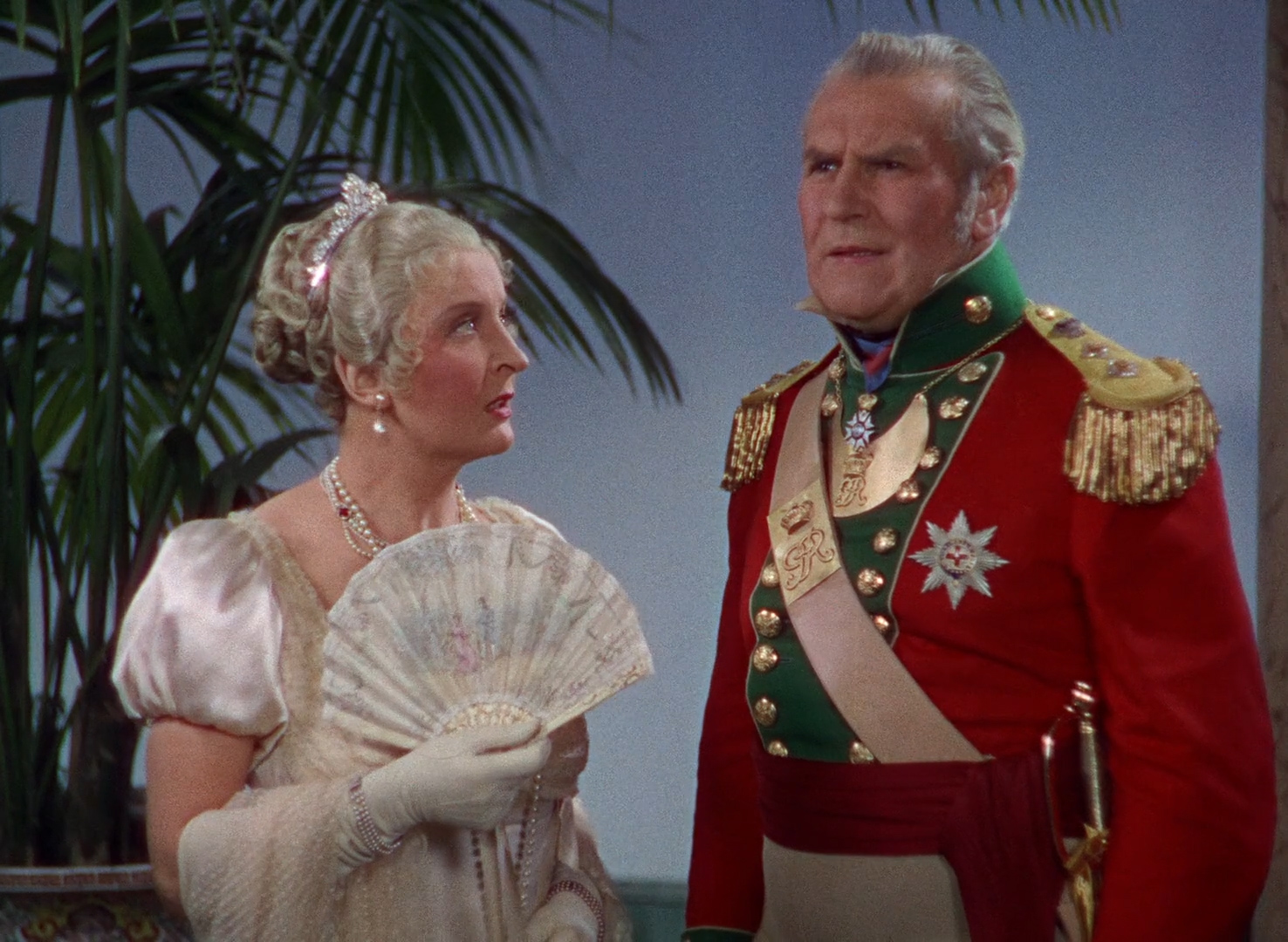
Becky Sharp (1935) became the first feature film photographed entirely in three-strip Technicolor.

Technicolor's advantage over most early natural-color processes was that it was a subtractive synthesis rather than an additive one: unlike the additive Kinemacolor and Chronochrome processes, Technicolor prints did not require any special projection equipment. Unlike the additive Dufaycolor process, the projected image was not dimmed by a light-absorbing and obtrusive mosaic color filter layer. Very importantly, compared to competing subtractive systems, Technicolor offered the best balance between high image quality and speed of printing.

The Technicolor Process 4 camera, manufactured to Technicolor's detailed specifications by Mitchell Camera Corporation, contained a beam splitter consisting of a partially reflecting surface inside a split-cube prism, color filters, and three separate rolls of black-and-white film (hence the "three-strip" designation). The beam splitter allowed one-third of the light coming through the camera lens to pass through the reflector and a green filter and form an image on one of the strips, which therefore recorded only the green-dominated third of the spectrum.

The other two-thirds was reflected sideways by the mirror and passed through a magenta filter, which absorbed green light and allowed only the red and blue thirds of the spectrum to pass. Behind this filter were the other two strips of film, their emulsions pressed into contact face to face. The front film was a red-blind orthochromatic type that recorded only the blue light. On the surface of its emulsion was a red-orange coating that prevented blue light from continuing on to the red-sensitive panchromatic emulsion of the film behind it, which therefore recorded only the red-dominated third of the spectrum.

Each of the three resulting negatives was printed onto a special matrix film. After processing, each matrix was a nearly invisible representation of the series of film frames as gelatin reliefs, thickest (and most absorbent) where each image was darkest and thinnest where it was lightest. Each matrix was soaked in a dye complementary to the color of light recorded by the negative printed on it: cyan for red, magenta for green, and yellow for blue (see also: CMYK color model for a technical discussion of color printing).

A single clear strip of black-and-white film with the soundtrack and frame lines printed in advance was first treated with a mordant solution and then brought into contact with each of the three dye-loaded matrix films in turn, building up the complete color image. Each dye was absorbed, or imbibed, by the gelatin coating on the receiving strip rather than simply deposited onto its surface, hence the term "dye imbibition". Strictly speaking, this is a mechanical printing process most closely related to Woodburytype and very loosely comparable to offset printing or lithography, and not a photographic one, as the actual printing does not involve a chemical change caused by exposure to light.

During the early years of the process, the receiver film was preprinted with a 50% black-and-white image derived from the green strip, the so-called Key, or K, record. This procedure was used largely to cover up fine edges in the picture where colors would mix unrealistically (also known as fringing). This additional black increased the contrast of the final print and concealed any fringing. However, overall colorfulness was compromised as a result. In 1944, Technicolor had improved the process to make up for these shortcomings and the K record was eliminated.

==== Early adoption by Disney ====
Kalmus convinced Walt Disney to shoot one of his Silly Symphony cartoons, Flowers and Trees (1932), in Process 4, the new "three-strip" process. Seeing the potential in full-color Technicolor, Disney negotiated an exclusive contract for the use of the process in animated films that extended to September 1935. Other animation producers, such as the Fleischer Studios and Animated Pictures Corp., were shut out – they had to settle for either the two-color Technicolor systems or use a competing process such as Cinecolor.

Flowers and Trees was a success with audiences and critics alike, and won the first Academy Award for Best Animated Short Film. All subsequent Silly Symphonies from 1933 on were shot with the three-strip process. One Silly Symphony, Three Little Pigs (1933), engendered such a positive audience response that it overshadowed the feature films with which it was shown. Hollywood was buzzing about color film again. According to Fortune magazine, "Merian C. Cooper, producer for RKO Radio Pictures and director of King Kong (1933), saw one of the Silly Symphonies and said he never wanted to make a black-and-white picture again."

Although Disney's first 60 or so Technicolor cartoons used the three-strip camera, an improved "successive exposure" ("SE") process was adopted c. 1937. This variation of the three-strip process was designed primarily for cartoon work: the camera would contain one strip of black-and-white negative film, and each animation cel would be photographed three times, on three sequential frames, behind alternating red, green, and blue filters (the so-called "Technicolor Color Wheel", then an option of the Acme, Producers Service and Photo-Sonics animation cameras). Three separate dye transfer printing matrices would be created from the red, green, and blue records in their respective complementary colors, cyan, magenta and yellow.

Successive exposure was also employed in Disney's "True Life Adventure" live-action series, wherein the original 16mm low-contrast Kodachrome Commercial live action footage was first duplicated onto a 35mm fine-grain SE negative element in one pass of the 16mm element, thereby reducing wear of the 16mm original, and also eliminating registration errors between colors. The live-action SE negative thereafter entered other Technicolor processes and were incorporated with SE animation and three-strip studio live-action, as required, thereby producing the combined result.

==== Convincing Hollywood ====
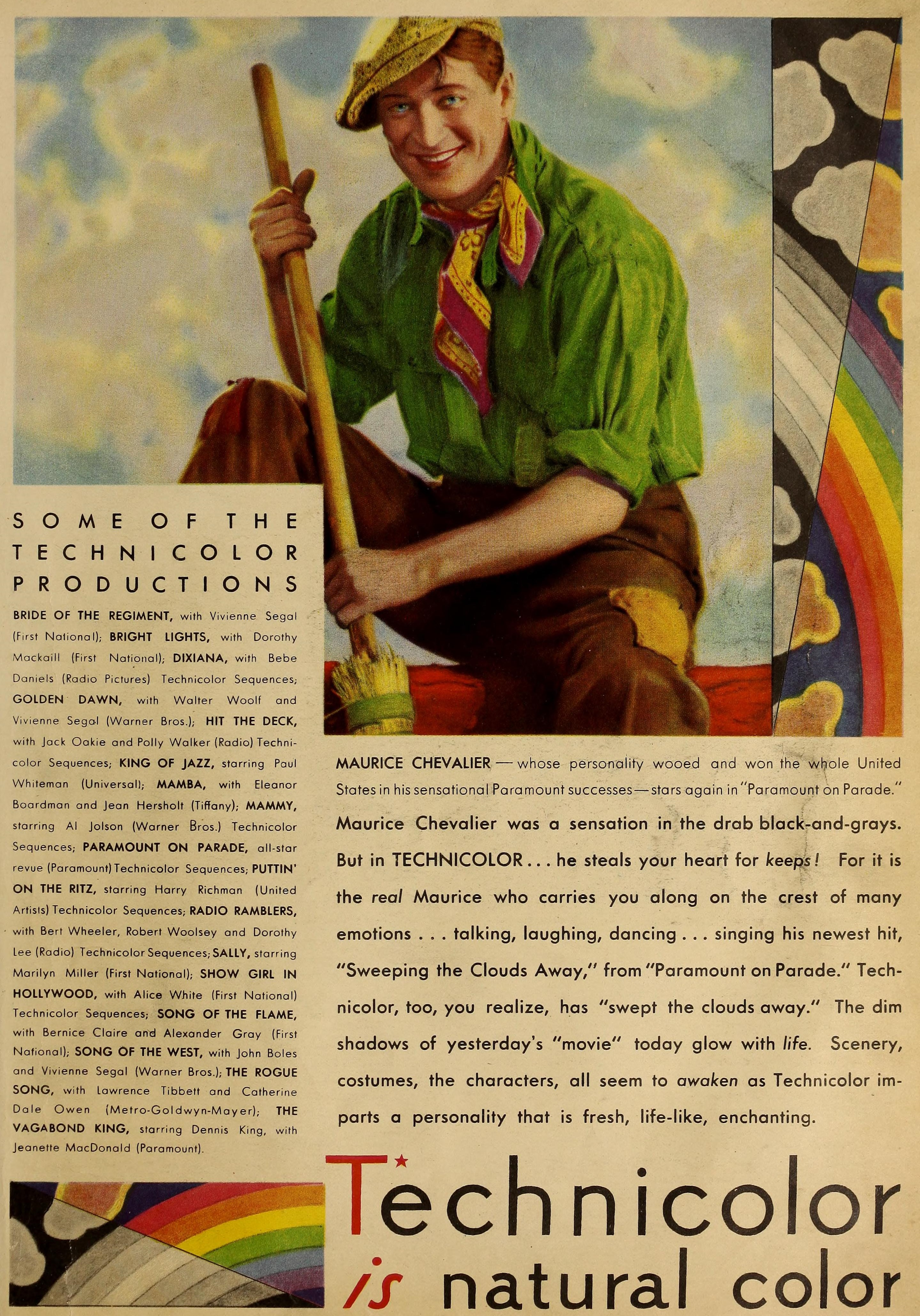
1930 advertisement featuring Maurice Chevalier in Paramount on Parade

The studios were willing to adopt three-color Technicolor for live-action feature production, if it could be proved viable. Shooting three-strip Technicolor required very bright lighting, as the film had an extremely slow speed of ASA 5. That, and the bulk of the cameras and a lack of experience with three-color cinematography made for skepticism in the studio boardrooms.

An October 1934 article in Fortune magazine stressed that Technicolor, as a corporation, was rather remarkable in that it kept its investors quite happy despite the fact that it had only been in profit twice in all of the years of its existence, during the early boom at the turn of the decade. A well-managed company, half of whose stock was controlled by a clique loyal to Kalmus, Technicolor never had to cede any control to its bankers or unfriendly stockholders. In the mid-'30s, all the major studios except MGM were in the financial doldrums, and a color process that truly reproduced the visual spectrum was seen as a possible shot-in-the-arm for the ailing industry.

In November 1933, Technicolor's Herbert Kalmus and RKO announced plans to produce three-strip Technicolor films in 1934, beginning with Ann Harding starring in a projected film The World Outside.

Live-action use of three-strip Technicolor was first seen in a musical number of the Metro-Goldwyn-Mayer feature The Cat and the Fiddle, released February 16, 1934. On April 7, 20th Century Pictures released The House of Rothschild with a Technicolor sequence in its final scene and on the end card and is the only film released by 20th Century to have such sequences. On July 1, MGM released Hollywood Party with a Technicolor cartoon sequence "Hot Choc-late Soldiers" produced by Walt Disney. On July 28 of that year, Warner Bros. released Service with a Smile, followed by Good Morning, Eve! on September 22, both being comedy short films starring Leon Errol and filmed in three-strip Technicolor. Pioneer Pictures, a movie company formed by Technicolor investors, produced the film usually credited as the first live-action short film shot in the three-strip process, La Cucaracha released August 31, 1934.

La Cucaracha is a two-reel musical comedy that cost $65,000, approximately four times what an equivalent black-and-white two-reeler would cost. Released by RKO, the short was a success in introducing the new Technicolor as a viable medium for live-action films. The three-strip process also was used in some short sequences filmed for several movies made during 1934, including the final sequences of The House of Rothschild (Twentieth Century Pictures/United Artists) with George Arliss and Kid Millions (Samuel Goldwyn Studios) with Eddie Cantor.

Pioneer/RKO's Becky Sharp (1935) became the first feature film photographed entirely in three-strip Technicolor. Initially, three-strip Technicolor was only used indoors. In 1936, The Trail of the Lonesome Pine became the first color production to have outdoor sequences, with impressive results. The spectacular success of Snow White and the Seven Dwarfs (1937), which was released in December 1937 and became the top-grossing film of 1938, attracted the attention of the studios.

==== Limitations and difficulties ====
I am not sure how much the picture’s lack of effect is the result of its technicolor. I myself find it difficult to take seriously a movie made in technicolor: profundity seems out of key with the carnival spirit of the color, which is always gay and bright, mask-like, without substance. Nor am I sure how much of the film’s stiffness and unmaneuverability is the product of technicolor.

— Film critic Manny Farber on the 1943 Technicolor film For Whom the Bell Tolls, The New Republic, July 19, 1944.

One major drawback of Technicolor's three-strip process was that the cameras required a special, bulky, large volume sound blimp. Film studios could not purchase Technicolor cameras, only rent them for their productions, complete with camera technicians and a "color supervisor" to ensure sets, costumes, and makeup didn't push beyond the limitations of the system. Often on many early productions, the supervisor was Natalie Kalmus, ex-wife of Herbert Kalmus and part owner of the company. Directors had great difficulty with her; Vincente Minnelli said, "I couldn't do anything right in Mrs. Kalmus's eyes."

Kalmus preferred the title "Technicolor Director", although British licensees generally insisted on "Colour Control" so as not to "dilute" the film director's title. She worked with quite a number of "associates", many of whom went uncredited, and after her retirement, these associates were transferred to the licensees, with, for example, Leonard Doss going to Fox where he performed the same function for Fox's DeLuxe Color.

The process of splitting the image reduced the amount of light reaching the film stock. Since the film speed of the stocks used was fairly slow, early Technicolor productions required a greater amount of lighting than a black-and-white production. It is reported that temperatures from the hot studio lights on the film set of The Wizard of Oz frequently exceeded 100 °F (38 °C), and some of the more heavily costumed characters required a large water intake. Some actors and actresses claimed to have suffered permanent eye damage from the high levels of carbon arc illumination with its highly actinic ultraviolet.

Because of the added lighting, triple amount of film, and the expense of producing dye transfer projection prints, Technicolor demanded high film budgets.

==== The introduction of Eastmancolor and decline ====
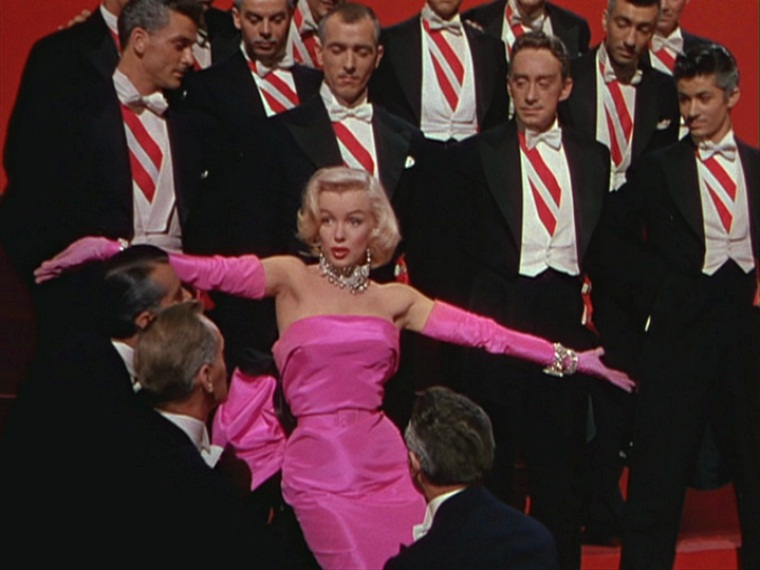
Gentlemen Prefer Blondes, an example of Technicolor filming in 1950s Hollywood.

Color films that recorded the three primary colors in three emulsion layers on one strip of film had been introduced in the mid-1930s by Eastman Kodak in the United States (Kodachrome for 16mm home movies in 1935, then for 8mm home movies and 35mm slides in 1936) and Agfa in Germany (Agfacolor Neu for both home movies and slides later in 1936). Technicolor introduced Monopack, a single-strip color reversal film (a 35 mm lower-contrast version of Kodachrome) in 1941 for use on location where the bulky three-strip camera was impractical, but the higher grain of the image made it unsuitable for studio work.

Eastman Kodak introduced its first 35 mm color motion picture negative film in 1950. The first commercial feature film to use Eastmancolor was the National Film Board of Canada documentary Royal Journey, released in December 1951. In 1952, Eastman Kodak introduced a high-quality color print film, allowing studios to produce prints through standard photographic processes as opposed to having to send them to Technicolor for the expensive dye imbibition process. That same year, the Technicolor lab adapted its dye transfer process (internally known as tri-robo – Italian for 'three-strip') to derive triple matrices and imbibition prints directly from Eastmancolor negatives, as well as other stocks such as Ansco and DuPont color stocks.

Foxfire (1955), filmed in 1954 by Universal, starring Jane Russell and Jeff Chandler, was the last American-made feature photographed with a Technicolor three-strip camera. The last British film to be shot in Process 4 was Ealing Studios' The Feminine Touch (1956). Invitation to the Dance (1956) and Jet Pilot (1957) were released later.

In an attempt to capitalize on the Hollywood 3-D craze, Technicolor unveiled its stereoscopic camera for 3-D films in March 1953. The rig used two three-strip cameras, running a total of six strips of film at once (three for the left eye and three for the right). Only two films were shot with this camera set-up: Flight to Tangier (1953) and the Martin and Lewis comedy Money From Home (1953). A similar, but different system had been used by a different company, using two three-strip cameras side by side for a British short called Royal River. A number of 3-D films were made by RKO using Technicolor Monopack.

In 1953, the Technicolor Motion Pictures Corporation signed an agreement with the French groups Gaumont and Pathé and set up the subsidiary Société Technicolor. Its plant is located on the outskirts of Paris. It closed in 1958 after experiencing numerous economic and financial difficulties.

Technicolor expanded into India in the 1950s and Jhansi Ki Rani was the first Technicolor film made in India. In 1956, Technicolor made an agreement with Ramnord Research Laboratories as its processor. An imbibition lab was planned for Bombay, but was never created.

As the end of the Technicolor process became apparent, the company repurposed its three-color cameras for wide-screen photography, and introduced the Technirama process in 1957. Other formats the company ventured into included VistaVision, Todd-AO, and Ultra Panavision 70. All of them were an improvement over the three-strip negatives, since the negative print-downs generated sharper and finer grain dye transfer copies. By the mid-1960s, the dye-transfer process eventually fell out of favor in the United States as being too expensive and too slow in turning out prints. With the growing number of screens in the US, the standard run of 200–250 prints increased. And while dye-transfer printing yielded superior color printing, the number of high speed prints that could be struck in labs all over the country outweighed the fewer, slower number of prints that could only be had in Technicolor's labs. One of the final American films printed by Technicolor was The Godfather Part II (1974).

A lab was established in Italy to circumvent taxes on foreign film imports. In 1975, the US dye transfer plant was closed and Technicolor became an Eastman-only processor. In 1977, the final dye-transfer printer left in Rome was used by Dario Argento to make prints for his horror film Suspiria. Technicolor's lab in Paris closed in 1958, as it was facing 450 million francs in debt. In 1980, the Italian Technicolor plant ceased printing dye transfer.

The British line was shut down in 1978 and sold to Beijing Film and Video Lab which shipped the equipment to China. A great many films from China and Hong Kong were made in the Technicolor dye transfer process, including Zhang Yimou's Ju Dou (1990) and even one American film, Space Avenger (1989), directed by Richard W. Haines. The Beijing line was shut down in 1993 for a number of reasons, including inferior processing.

== Post-1995 usage ==
=== Reintroduction of the dye transfer process ===
In 1997, Technicolor reintroduced the dye-transfer process to general film printing. A refined version of the printing process of the 1960s and 1970s, it was used on a limited basis in the restorations of films such as The Wizard of Oz, Gone with the Wind, Rear Window, Funny Girl, and Apocalypse Now Redux.

After its reintroduction, the dye-transfer process was used in several big-budget, modern Hollywood productions. These included Bulworth, The Thin Red Line, Godzilla, Toy Story 2, and Pearl Harbor.

The dye-transfer process was discontinued by Technicolor in 2002 after the company was purchased by Thomson.

=== Dye transfer Technicolor in archival work ===
By the late 1990s, the dye transfer process still had its advantages in the film archival community. Because the dye transfer process used stable acid dyes, Technicolor prints are considered of archival quality. A Technicolor print from the dye transfer era will retain its original colors virtually unchanged for decades with proper storage, whereas prints printed on Eastmancolor stocks produced prior to 1983 may suffer color fading after exposure to ultraviolet light and hot, humid conditions as a result of less stable photochemical dyes. Fading on some prints is so rapid that in some cases, after as little as five to ten years, the colors of the print have faded to a brownish red.

Furthermore, three-strip camera negatives are all on silver-based black-and-white stock, which have stayed unaltered over the course of time with proper handling. This has become of importance in recent years with the large market for films transferred to video formats for home viewing. The best color quality control for video transfer by far is achieved by optically printing from Technicolor negatives, or by recombining the three-strip black and white negatives through digital means and printing, onto low-contrast stock. Director George Lucas had a three-strip archival negative, and one or more imbibition prints made of Star Wars; this "protection" copy was consulted for color values in putting together the 1997 Special Edition of Star Wars.

One problem that has resulted from Technicolor negatives is the rate of shrinkage from one strip to another. Because three-strip negatives are shot on three rolls, they are subject to different rates of shrinkage depending on storage conditions. Today, digital technology allows for a precise re-alignment of the negatives by resizing shrunken negatives digitally to correspond with the other negatives. The G, or Green, record is usually taken as the reference as it is the record with the highest resolution.

It is also a record with the correct "wind" (emulsion position with respect to the camera's lens). Shrinkage and re-alignment (resizing) are non-issues with Successive Exposure (single-roll RGB) Technicolor camera negatives. This issue could have been eliminated, for three-strip titles, had the preservation elements (fine-grain positives) been Successive Exposure, but this would have required the preservation elements to be 3,000 feet or 6,000 feet whereas three-strip composited camera and preservation elements are 1,000 feet or 2,000 feet (however, three records of that length are needed).

One issue that modern reproduction has had to contend with is that the contrast of the three film strips is not the same. This gives the effect on Technicolor prints that (for example) cinematic fades cause the color balance of the image to change as the image is faded. Transfer to digital media has attempted to correct the differing color balances and is largely successful. However, a few odd artifacts remain such that saturated parts of the image may show a false color. Where the image of a flame is included in shot, it will rarely be of the expected orange/yellow color, often being depicted as green.

=== Technicolor today ===
Technicolor logo since 2010

The Technicolor company remained a highly successful film processing firm and later became involved in video and audio duplication (CD, VHS and DVD manufacturing) and digital video processes. MacAndrews & Forbes acquired Technicolor, Inc. in 1982 for $100 million, then sold it in 1988 to the British firm Carlton Communications PLC for $780 million. Technicolor, Inc. acquired the film processing company CFI in 2000. Since 2001, Technicolor has been part of the French-headquartered electronics and media conglomerate Thomson Multimedia SA. The name of Thomson group was changed to "Technicolor SA" as of February 1, 2010, re-branding the entire company after its American film technology subsidiary.

On June 24, 2020, Technicolor filed for Chapter 15 bankruptcy in the United States, citing COVID-19 as the reason for its impact.

In May 2021, Technicolor's post-production unit was acquired by Streamland Media. On September 27, 2022, Technicolor SA, which maintains the IoT, broadband and video solution businesses, rebranded as Vantiva, while the VFX, motion graphics and animation businesses now operated by Technicolor Creative Studios; these two were spun-off as the publicly independent companies.

The visual aesthetic of dye transfer Technicolor continues to be used in Hollywood, usually in films set in the mid-20th century. Parts of The Aviator (2004), the biopic of Howard Hughes, were digitally manipulated to imitate color processes that were available during the periods each scene takes place.

Mostly, during the credits of a film, the text "Color by Technicolor" or "Prints by Technicolor" is shown.

== See also ==
- List of motion picture film formats
- List of color film systems
- Imbibition
- Dye-transfer process
- List of early color feature films
- List of three-strip Technicolor films
- Color print film
- Color photography

== Works cited ==
- Street, Sarah; Yumibe, Joshua, eds. (2024). Global Film Color: The Monopack Revolution at Midcentury. Rutgers University Press. ISBN 978-1-97883-683-9.
- Farber, Manny (2009). Polito, Robert (ed.). Farber on Film: The Complete Film Writings of Manny Farber. Library of America. ISBN 978-1-59853-050-6.
