= Lansing Hatfield =

American opera singer (1910–1954)

Lansing Hatfield (February 4, 1910 – August 22, 1954) was an American bass-baritone and radio personality who had an active performance career in operas, operettas, musicals, and concerts from mid 1930s until the late 1940s. He is best remembered for his frequent performances on American radio during the late 1930s and early 1940s, and two roles he created on Broadway: Daniel Webster in Douglas Moore's 1939 opera The Devil and Daniel Webster at the Martin Beck Theatre, and Reverend Alfred Davidson in Vernon Duke and Howard Dietz's 1944 musical Sadie Thompson at the Alvin Theatre. In 1941 he won the Metropolitan Opera Auditions of the Air, and was a resident artist at the Met from 1941 to 1944.

== Early life, education, and initial career ==
Born in Franklin, Virginia, Hatfield graduated from Lenoir–Rhyne University and then worked as a public school teacher before his career as a singer. While a student at Lenoir-Rhyne he sang in the university's glee club. He was trained in opera performance at the Peabody Conservatory in Baltimore, Maryland after winning a full scholarship to that institution. He began his singing career on radio while a graduate student at Peabody after winning Texaco's national singing contest with pianist Eddy Duchin serving as host and head judge. That competition win earned him a contract as a regular performer on WMAL-FM on Saturday nights in 1935. In 1936 he co-hosted the educational radio program "Treasure Trails" on NBC Radio for the National Park Service, and was featured in concerts broadcast nationally on CBS Radio for the Columbia Concerts Corporation. That same year he was featured performer in vaudeville entertainments at the Hippodrome Theatre in Baltimore. He continued to appear on radio programs periodically during his career, including performances on The Chase and Sanborn Hour (1940), The Andre Kostelanetz Show (1941), and Texaco's Dollars for Defense (1941); the latter a fund raising program for the United States military during World War II.

In 1937 Hatfield made his Broadway debut as Captain Boyd in the premiere of Arthur Schwartz's operetta Virginia at the Center Theatre. In 1939 he returned to Broadway to portray Daniel Webster in the world premiere of Douglas Moore's 1939 opera The Devil and Daniel Webster at the Martin Beck Theatre. The work was presented in a double bill with Sarah Newmeyer and Clarence Loomis's Susanna Don't You Cry; a musical featuring the music of Stephen Foster in which Hatfield portrayed the character of Brian Tolliver. In March 1939 he was the bass soloist in Bach's Mass in B minor at Carnegie Hall with the Oratorio Society of New York.

In the summer of 1939 Hatfield starred in three works with the Municipal Opera of Saint Louis (MOSL): George M. Cohan's Rose Marie (as Jack Keene), Paul Abraham's Victoria and Her Hussar (as Stefan Koltay), and George Gershwin and Oscar Hammerstein II's Song of the Flame. He returned the MOSL in 1940 as Captain Jim Stewart in Harry Tierney's Rio Rita. He toured the United States as a recitalist in 1941 for the Columbia Concerts Corporation, and was listed as one of their top grossing artists of that year.

== Performing at the Metropolitan Opera ==
In 1941 Hatfield won the Metropolitan Opera Auditions of the Air which led to a contract a resident artist with the company. His first performance for the Met was on tour with the company to Montreal in 1941, portraying the King of Egypt in Giuseppe Verdi's Aida at the Théâtre Saint-Denis in September of that year. He made his debut at the Metropolitan Opera House on December 29, 1941 as Monterone in Verdi's Rigoletto with Robert Weede in the title role and Ettore Panizza conducting. In January 1942 he was featured singer in a gala concert at the Met, singing the aria Il lacerato spirito from Verdi's Simon Boccanegra and sharing the stage with singers Licia Albanese, Nadine Conner, Frederick Jagel, Stella Roman, and Frank Valentino. Other roles he sang at the Met through 1944 included Abimélech in Camille Saint-Saëns's Samson and Delilah, Armoured Man in Wolfgang Amadeus Mozart's The Magic Flute, The King of Egypt in Aida, Lavitsky in Modest Mussorgsky's Boris Godunov, a Noblemen of Brabant in Richard Wagner's Lohengrin, Pinellino in Giacomo Puccini's Gianni Schicchi, and Zuniga in Georges Bizet's Carmen. His final performance at the Met was on February 26, 1944 as Schlemil in Offenbach's The Tales of Hoffmann with Raoul Jobin in the title role, Patrice Munsel as Olympia, Mack Harrell as Lindorff, and Thomas Beecham conducting.

== Other work and death ==
In 1942 Hatfield performed the title role in Felix Mendelssohn's Elijah at the Worcester Music Festival, Massachusetts with the Philadelphia Orchestra and conductor Eugene Ormandy. That same year he sang in "camp shows" with the United Service Organizations for the United States Armed Forces serving during World War II. In 1943 he toured in concerts to major cities in Australia, raising money for the Australian Comforts Fund; a charity providing aid to active Australian military families, and performed for American troops on the Pacific front with the USO with Edwin McArthur accompanying him on the accordion.

In 1944-1945 Lansing returned to Broadway as Reverend Alfred Davidson in Howard Dietz and Rouben Mamoulian's musical Sadie Thompson at the Alvin Theatre; starring opposite June Havoc. He performed for the inaugural dinner of President Franklin D. Roosevelt’s fourth term in January 1945 at the Mayflower Hotel at the invitation of Eleanor Roosevelt. Later that year he was the bass soloist in Haydn's The Creation at the Academy of Music in Philadelphia. In 1946 he performed in the Pittsburgh Civic Light Opera’s inaugural season, as Villon in Rudolf Friml’s The Vagabond King. In 1947 he portrayed Captain Jim Stewart in Rio Rita at the Iroquois Amphitheatre.

In 1950 Lansing and his wife, Irene Sticht, moved to Asheville, North Carolina, where he worked for local radio stations and was the music director of the Grove Park Inn. He died in 1954 at the age of 44 in a hospital in Asheville.
