= Alexander Gray (actor) =

American actor and singer (1891–1976)

- Alexander Gray circa 1932
- Born: 8 January 1891; Wrightsville, Pennsylvania
- Died: 4 October 1976 (aged 85); Indio, California, U.S.
- Occupations: Actor; Singer
- Years active: 1915–1952

Alexander Pringle Gray III (January 8, 1891 – October 4, 1976) was an American actor and singer. In the 1920s he became known for his performances in operettas on Broadway. By the end of the decade, he began acting in musical films, and in the mid-1930s, he returned to New York to perform in vaudeville. Gray continued to perform until mid-century.

== Early life and education ==
Gray was born in Wrightsville, Pennsylvania, the descendant of a long line of Pennsylvanian Scotch Presbyterians. He lived his early years working on his family's farm in Pennsylvania and developed an interest in singing.

He attended Pennsylvania State University, where he studied industrial engineering. He sang with the university's glee club. During the college years of his life, he worked stoking furnaces, washing dishes, and as a door-to-door salesman, selling aluminum kitchen utensils. His other early jobs included sailor, shop teacher, and editor of a trade publication.

He then moved to Chicago, Illinois, spending nearly a decade as a motor truck advertiser at Diamond T. Truck Company, training his voice in his free time. He became an advertising manager at the company.

== Broadway ==
In 1915, Gray won the National Federation of Music Clubs competition as a baritone. He began his professional performing career in the Ziegfeld Follies on Broadway from 1921 to 1925. He then performed in further Broadway productions, including Song of the Flame (1925–1926), The Desert Song (1926–1927), and Sally.

During the 1940s he returned to Broadway, appearing in John Henry and Blossom Time (1943).

== Films ==
The invention of the Vitaphone in 1926 permitted the production of films with synchronized sound and created a demand for singers who could act in musical films. Seizing this opportunity Gray moved to California. He starred in the films Sally, Song of the Flame, Viennese Nights, Spring Is Here, Moonlight and Pretzels, and the short "The Red Shadow", between the years of 1929 and 1933. Most of these appearances were alongside the actress Bernice Claire.

With the demand of singing talkies waning in the mid-1930s, Gray moved back to New York, where he pursued a vaudeville career. From 1951 to 1952, he hosted a TV show called This Is Music.

== Personal life ==
On June 22, 1916, Gray married Jeannette Rose Wolff in Chicago. They had one child together. Despite rumors in the press, Gray stated that he and Bernice Claire were not romantic partners.

On January 29, 1929, his wife and the brother of Bernice Claire were driving though Kenton, Ohio. Jeannette saw a railroad crossing while traveling down an icy hill, causing her to swerve and crash into a signal post. This resulted in her death, and Claire's brother, Jahnegen, was injured. A third passenger, Mrs. Russel Martin, sustained minor injuries. Jeannette was buried at the Gray Chicago home.
