= Spring Is Here (film) =

1930 film

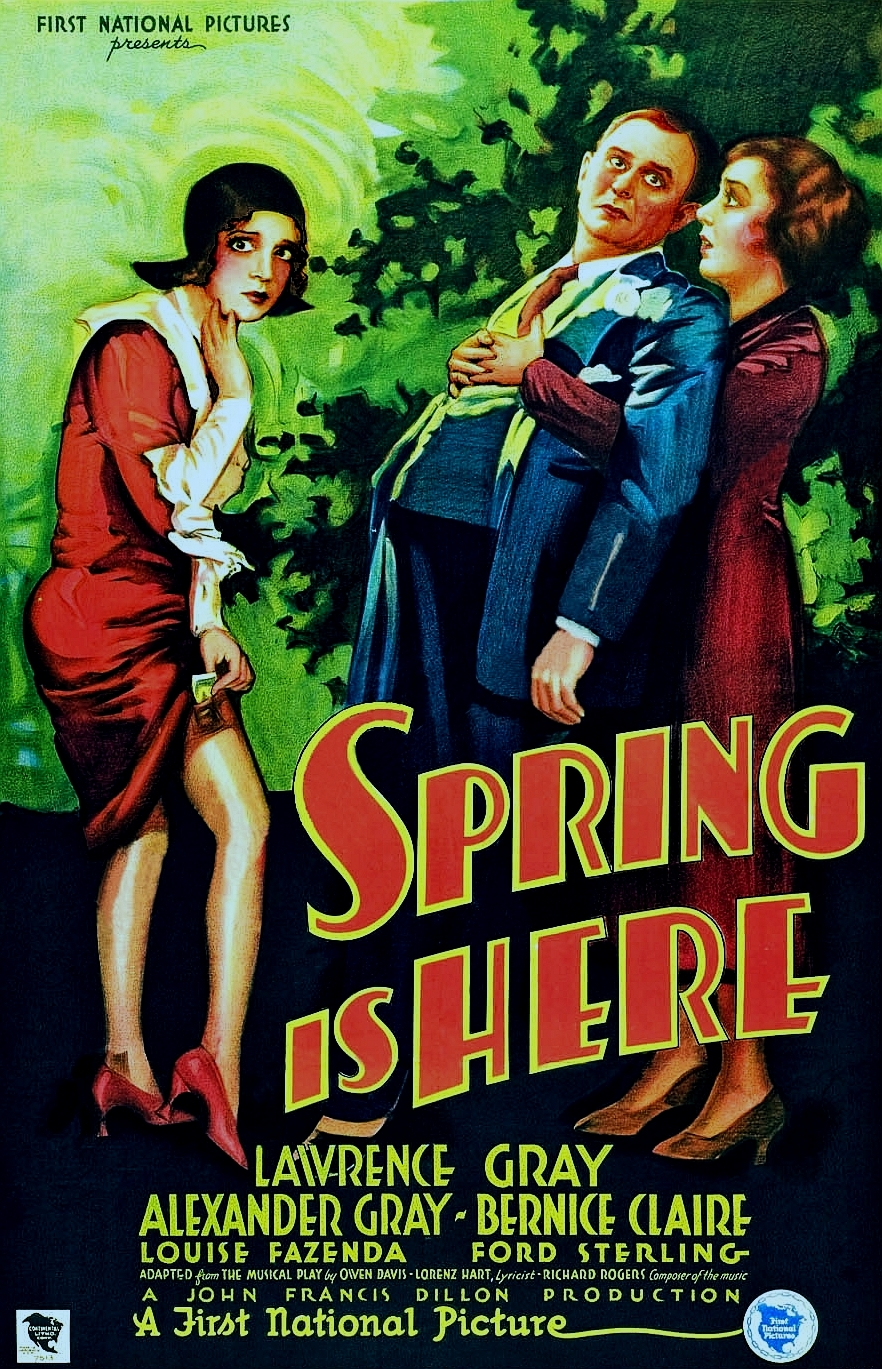
- Theatrical release poster
- Directed by: John Francis Dillon
- Written by: James A. Starr
- Based on: Spring Is Here; 1929 play by Richard Rodgers (music); Lorenz Hart (lyrics); Owen Davis (book)
- Produced by: John Francis Dillon
- Starring: Lawrence Gray; Alexander Gray; Bernice Claire
- Cinematography: Lee Garmes
- Music by: Cecil Copping; Alois Reiser; Richard Rodgers; Lorenz Hart (lyrics); Harry Warren
- Production company: First National Pictures
- Distributed by: Warner Bros. Pictures
- Release date: April 13, 1930
- Running time: 69 minutes
- Country: United States
- Language: English

Spring Is Here is a 1930 American Pre-Code musical comedy film produced by First National Pictures and distributed by Warner Bros. Pictures. It was adapted by James A. Starr from the 1929 musical play, of the same name, by Owen Davis, with music by Richard Rodgers and Lorenz Hart. The film stars Lawrence Gray, Alexander Gray, and Bernice Claire.

An abridged version of the play, with a different cast, was released in 1933 as the musical short Yours Sincerely.

== Plot ==
Spring Is Here (1930)

Betty Braley is in love with Steve Alden. Her father, Peter, approves another suitor, Terry Clayton. Terry is shy and clumsy while Steve is outgoing and romantic. When Betty returns one night at 5 a.m. with Steve, her father orders him to stay away from his daughter. Terry, discouraged at being rejected by Betty, is offered help by Mary Jane, Betty's younger sister. Terry follows her advice and attempts to make Betty jealous to get her attention. The trick works and soon Betty thinks she is deeply in love with Terry. Her father gets into an argument with Steve and tells him to leave his house for good. Steve returns in the middle of the night to elope with Betty but Terry shows up and carries her off for himself. In the morning they are found together in Betty's room, to the shock of the family, and they eventually reveal to everyone that they have eloped.

== Cast ==
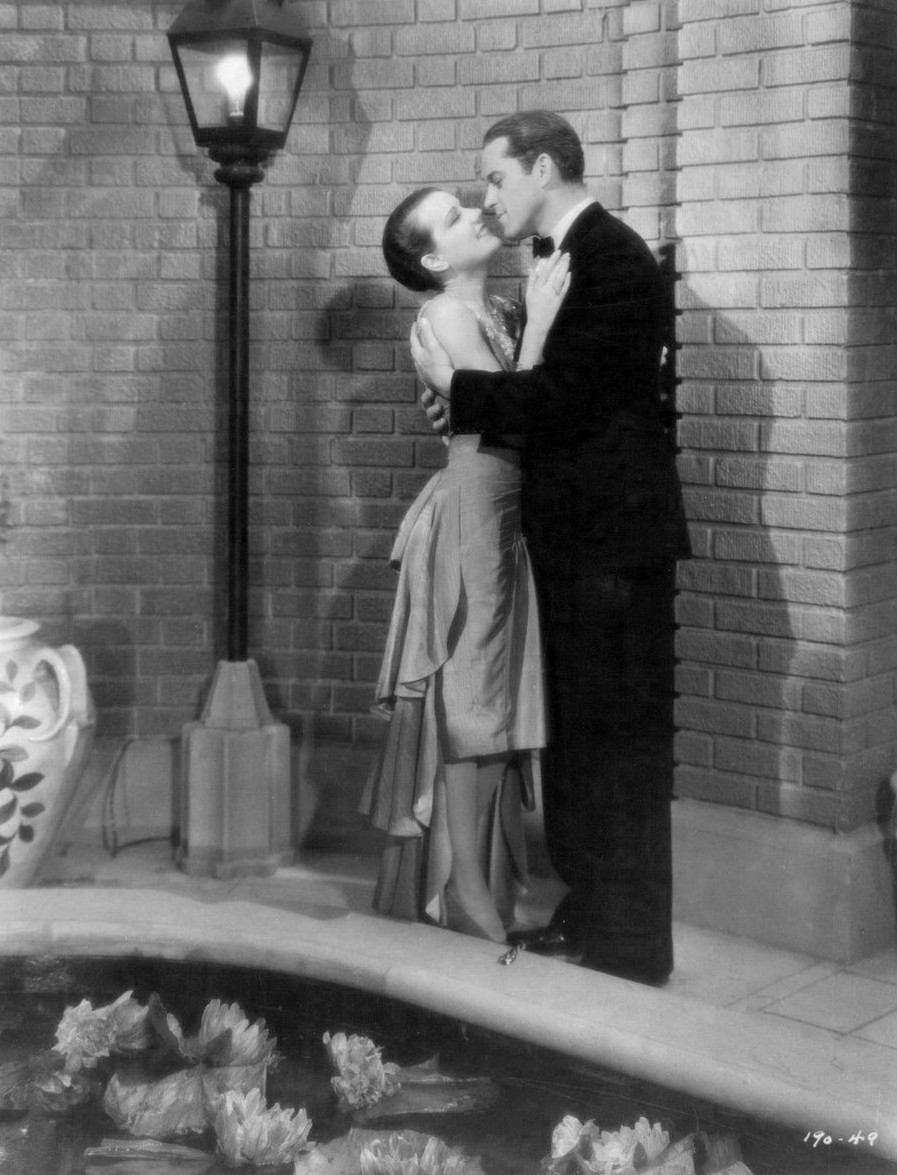
Bernice Claire and Alexander Gray in Spring Is Here

- Lawrence Gray as Steve Alden
- Bernice Claire as Betty Braley
- Alexander Gray as Terry Clayton
- Louise Fazenda as Emily Braley
- Ford Sterling as Peter Braley
- Inez Courtney as Mary Jane Braley
- Frank Albertson as Stacy Adams
- Natalie Moorhead as Mrs. Rita Conway
- Brox Sisters as Singing Trio

== Songs ==
- "Spring Is Here (in Person)" - Performed by Frank Albertson and Inez Courtney
- "Yours Sincerely" - Performed by Alexander Gray and Bernice Claire
- "With a Song in My Heart" - Performed by Lawrence Gray and Bernice Claire
- "Bad Baby" - Performed by Inez Courtney
- "Cryin' for the Carolines" - Performed by the Brox Sisters
- "Have a Little Faith in Me" - Performed by Alexander Gray and Bernice Claire
- "How Shall I Tell?" - Performed by Bernice Claire
- "What's the Big Idea?" - Performed by Frank Albertson and Inez Courtney (vocal and dance)
- "With a Song in My Heart" - Reprised by Alexander Gray and Bernice Claire

== Preservation status ==
The film survives intact and has been aired on broadcast and cable television.
