= Golden Dawn (film) =

1930 American musical film

- Vivienne Segal and Walter Woolf King
- Directed by: Ray Enright
- Written by: Walter Anthony
- Based on: the operetta by Oscar Hammerstein II and Otto A. Harbach.
- Starring: Walter Woolf King; Vivienne Segal; Alice Gentle; Noah Beery, Sr.
- Cinematography: Frank B. Good; Dev Jennings (Technicolor)
- Music by: Herbert Stothart; Emmerich Kálmán; Rex Dunn; Robert Stolz
- Color process: Technicolor Process 3
- Production company: Warner Bros. Pictures
- Distributed by: Warner Bros. Pictures
- Release date: June 14, 1930
- Running time: 83 minutes
- Country: United States
- Language: English

Golden Dawn is a 1930 American pre-Code musical operetta film directed by Ray Enright that was photographed entirely in Technicolor. It stars Vivienne Segal, Walter Woolf King and Noah Beery.

The film is based on the 1927 stage musical of the same name.

== Plot ==
Golden Dawn (1930)

Dawn is a white girl who was kidnapped in infancy and is raised by a black native named Mooda, who runs a canteen in a German colonial settlement in Africa. Dawn falls in love with British rubber planter Tom Allen, who is now a prisoner of war. A native black tribal leader is also in love with Dawn and becomes jealous when he hears of Dawn's love for Allen. The Germans force Allen to return to England for attempting to steal Dawn, whom they believe is half black.

When the British regain control of the territory and expel the Germans, Allen returns to the colony. The settlement experiences a drought and the local tribal leader attempts to incite the natives against Dawn, claiming that God is angry because Dawn has dared to love a white man. Allen is unable to save Dawn because the colonial authorities refuse to act unless they have proof that Dawn is entirely white. Mooda confesses that she is not Dawn's true mother and that Dawn's real mother was white, a fact that Dawn's father confirms.

Allen quickly brings British troops just as the natives are about to sacrifice Dawn. During the ceremony, one of the virgin priestesses reveals that the jealous tribal leader has been lying about Dawn and that God is not interested in Dawn as she is pure white. The priestess also reveals that the tribal leader had violated her chastity and claims that the true reason for God's anger was this sacrilegious act. The tribal leader is deposed and sacrificed to the anger of the natives, and the drought quickly ends as rain falls. Dawn and Allen, happily reunited, sail to England together.

== Cast ==
- Walter Woolf King as Tom Allen
- Vivienne Segal as Dawn
- Noah Beery as Shep Keyes
- Alice Gentle as Mooda
- Dick Henderson as Duke
- Lupino Lane as Mr Pigeon
- Marion Byron as Joanna
- Edward Martindel as Colonel Judson
- Nina Quartero as Dawn's Maid-In-Waiting
- Sōjin Kamiyama as Piper
- Otto Matieson as Captain Eric
- Julanne Johnston as Sister Hedwig

== Songs ==
- "Africa Smiles No More" (Sung by Alice Gentle)
- "The Whip" (Sung by Noah Beery twice)
- "My Bwanna" (Sung by Vivienne Segal and chorus and reprised by Vivienne Segal)
- "We Two" (Sung by Marion Byron and Dick Henderson)
- "Dawn" (Sung by Walter Woolf King and reprised by a chorus during finale)
- "Mooda's Song" (Sung by Alice Gentle)
- "My Heart's Love Call" (Sung by Walter Woolf King)
- "It's a Long Way to Tipperary" (Sung by the British exchange prisoners)
- "In a Jungle Bungalow" (Sung by Lupino Lane and chorus, with dancing by Lupino Lane)
- "A Tiger" (Sung by Marion Byron and Lee Moran with dancing and reprised by Marion Byron)
- "Mulungu Thabu" (Sung by chorus with spoken interjections by Nigel de Brulier)
- "Dawn" (Reprised by chorus)

== Censorship ==
Before Golden Dawn could be exhibited in Kansas, the Kansas Board of Review required the removal of closeups of the native dance before the altar.

== Preservation status ==
The film survives in a black-and-white copy created in the 1950s by Associated Artists Productions. It is available on DVD from the Warner Archive Collection. One short fragment of an original color print was identified in the British Film Institute archives in 2014.

== See also ==
- List of early color feature films
