= Bernice Claire =

American singer and actress (1906–2003)

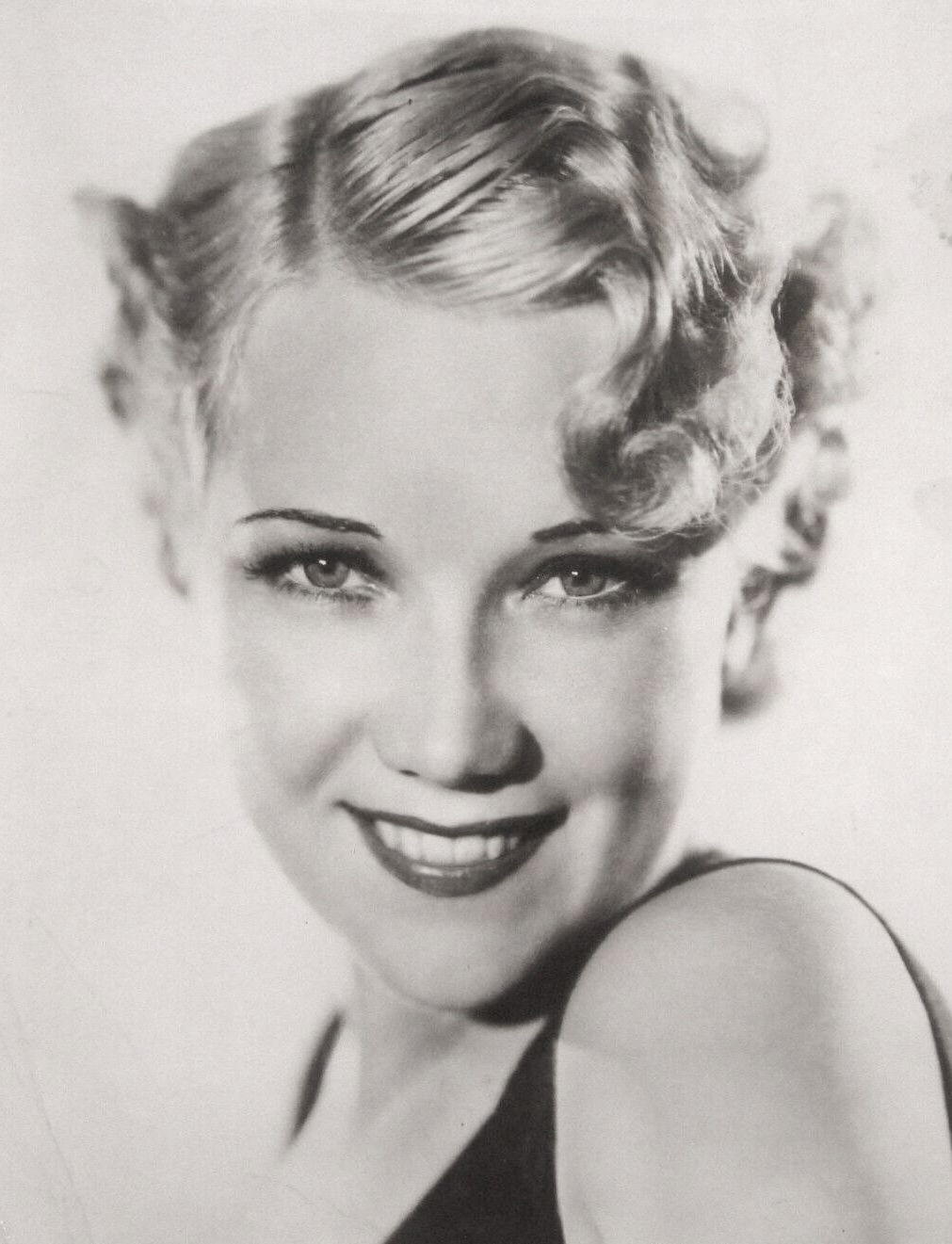
- Claire in 1938
- Born: Bernice Jahnigen (Note: Claire's surname was sometimes mistranscribed as Janighen); January 27, 1906; Oakland, California, U.S.
- Died: January 17, 2003 (aged 96); Portland, Oregon, U.S.
- Occupations: Singer; actress
- Years active: 1930–1938
- Spouse: Dr. Douglas P. Morris

Bernice Claire (born Bernice Jahnigen; January 27, 1906 – January 17, 2003) was an American singer and actress. She appeared in 13 films between 1930 and 1938.

== Early years ==
She was born as Bernice Jahnigen (surname later mistranscribed as Janighen) to Adolph and Clara (née Sternitzky) Jahnigen in 1906 in Oakland, California. She had an elder brother, Earl. Her birth name is also sometimes found as Bernice Jahnigan.

An article in the June 18, 1950, issue of the Oakland Tribune reported, "It was in 1918 that she first appeared as a juvenile, a pert little one with curled tresses who made an immediate impression on all who saw and heard her perform at Eastbay theaters and at lodges and veterans' gatherings." She attended Oakland High School, where she studied dramatics and was active in musical comedy productions.

== Career ==
With a clear coloratura, Claire took to the stage performing light opera and had no difficulty singing demanding roles. In 1927, she appeared in her first vaudeville production. She met then-leading singer Alexander Gray; they appeared in three Pre-Code films together in 1930 for Warner Bros., including a shortened film version of The Desert Song (titled The Red Shadow) in 1932. Gray and Claire became film's first operetta team, predating Jeanette MacDonald and Nelson Eddy.

Her first screen appearance was in the original film version of No, No, Nanette in the title role. (A post-Code version was made in 1940.) The other two films she made with Gray were Spring is Here and Song of the Flame. Operettas began losing popularity with audiences so Warners tried Claire in dramatic parts without much success. Claire made several more musical shorts up through the late thirties (some again with Gray), later becoming a radio and orchestra singer. In 1934, she appeared on Broadway in a short-lived musical, The Chocolate Soldier.

== Later life ==
Claire was married to Dr. Douglas P. Morris.

== Death ==
On January 17, 2003, ten days before her 97th birthday, Bernice Claire died from pneumonia in her adopted hometown of Portland, Oregon, where she had lived for many years.

== Filmography ==
- No, No, Nanette (1930)
- Spring Is Here (1930)
- Song of the Flame (1930)
- Numbered Men (1930)
- Top Speed (1930)
- Kiss Me Again (1931)
- The Red Shadow (1932)
- Moonlight and Pretzels (1933)
- The Flame Song (1934)
- Meet the Professor (1935)
- The Love Department (1935)
- Two Hearts in Harmony (1935)
- Between the Lines (1936)
- The Pretty Pretender (1937)
- Forget-Me-Knots (1938)
