= The Devil and Daniel Webster (opera) =

1939 folk opera by Douglas Moore

- Folk opera by Douglas Moore
- Librettist: Stephen Vincent Benét
- Language: English
- Based on: Benét's short story
- Premiere: 18 May 1939; Martin Beck Theatre, New York City

The Devil and Daniel Webster is a folk opera in one act by American composer Douglas Moore. The opera's English-language libretto was written by Stephen Vincent Benét who also penned the 1936 short story of the same name upon which the work is based.

Composed from 1937 through 1939, it premiered on Broadway at the Martin Beck Theatre on 18 May 1939. The first opera by Moore to achieve wide success, it has remained a part of the opera repertory. Containing spoken words as well as sung material, Martin Bookspan stated that "the opera is really a 20th-century American singspiel, with extensive stretches of dialogue alternating with the musical numbers." The opera is set in 1840s New Hampshire within the fictional town of Cross Corners.

Described as an "American Faust" for its similarities to the German tale with an American milieu, the opera tells the story of the farmer Jabez Stone who sells his soul to the devil. When the devil comes to collect his soul he is thwarted by the statesman Daniel Webster whose clever tongue outmaneuvers him.

== Roles ==
Roles, voice types, premiere cast
Role	Voice type	Premiere cast, 18 May 1939 Conductor: Fritz Reiner
Jabez Stone, a New Hampshire farmer	bass	John Gurney
Mary Stone, Jabez's wife	soprano	Nancy McCord
Daniel Webster, Secretary of State	baritone	Lansing Hatfield
Mr. Scratch, a Boston lawyer	tenor	George Rasely
The Fiddler	speaking role	Fred Stewart
Justice Hathorne	speaking role	Clair Kramer
Clerk of the Court	baritone	Edward Marshall
Simon Girty, a juror	tenor	Ernice Lawreace
King Philip (Metacomet), a juror	bass	Philip Whitfield
Teach (Blackbeard), a juror	baritone	Lawrence Siegle
Walter Butler, a juror	speaking role	Don Lee
Smeet, a juror		W. H. Mende
Dale, a juror		Paul Roberts
Morton, a juror		James Chartrand
Other juryman		Jay Amiss, Karl Holly, Alan Stewart, James Gillis, Frank Chamberlain
Chorus: Men and Women of Cross Corners, New Hampshire

== Plot ==
Setting: 1840s Cross Corners, New Hampshire

The farmer Jabez Stone has experienced great hardship and believes he is doomed to a future of bad luck. He makes a bargain with the lawyer Mr. Scratch, the opera's antagonist and devil figure, in which he sells his soul in exchange for prosperity. After a period of prosperity, Mr. Scratch comes to collect Jabez's soul on the occasion of his wedding to Mary. Contesting the claim on his soul, a trial ensues in which Jabez is defended by the statesman Daniel Webster. Mr. Scratch selects a judge and jury for the trial made up of the ghosts of famous historical American figures who are now residents of Hell; including the pirate Blackbeard and the British loyalists Walter Butler and Simon Girty. Webster successfully defends Stone, and the jury returns a verdict of not guilty.

== Composition history and premiere ==
Stephen Vincent Benét's short story The Devil and Daniel Webster was first published on 24 October 1936 in the Saturday Evening Post. Well received, Benét's short story quickly became the inspiration for several unauthorized stage adaptations by other writers. Wishing to put an end to these unauthorized works and capitalize on the apparent demand for a dramatization of the story, Benét contacted composer Douglas Moore with the idea of creating an opera adaptation in 1937. Moore agreed and began work on the music for the opera that year; writing most of the music in 1938 and continuing to make alterations to the score up until its premiere in 1939.

While Benét was the credited librettist and primary author, Moore had considerable creative input into the libretto which was created through a collaborative process between the two men. The libretto for the opera, rather than the short story, was in turn adapted by Benét into a stage play. That play became the basis for the 1941 film All That Money Can Buy for which composer Bernard Herrmann won an Academy Award.

The opera was presented by the newly created American Lyric Theatre (ALT) for the opening of its first season, and the opera premiered on Broadway at the Martin Beck Theatre on 18 May 1939 in a double bill with Virgil Thomson's ballet Filling Station. In describing the mix of people that attended the premiere, Lucius Beebe wrote the following in Los Angeles Times,

"Something more than a Broadway premiere, the occasion proved a synthesis of opera laced gloves, Murray Hill carriage trade, the curious werewolves of the belles-lettres and the regular swish and stamping of ballet loonies in beards, orange colored wigs, and platinum lamé gowns armed to the teeth with three-foot cigarette tubes and shepherds crook walking sticks. It was all very confusing to the dinner jacketed news photographers in the lobby, many of whom had never before encountered balletomanes 'en the rough' and were quite justifiably frighted as a result."

The ALT produced the show in conjunction with Richard Aldrich and the League of Composers. The Broadway production was funded by Eli Lilly and Company, directed by John Houseman, and utilized sets, costumes, and lights designed by Robert Edmond Jones. Following its run at the Martin Beck Theatre, the production was presented in several performances at the 1939 New York World's Fair.

== Performance history ==
In 1940 a concert version of the opera was performed at Barnard Hall with principal soloists from the Metropolitan Opera and the faculty of the Juilliard School. The performances used the symphony orchestra of Columbia University and an opera chorus made up of music students from Barnard College and Columbia. Other early stagings were given by the Chautauqua Opera (1940 and 1947), Los Angeles City College (1942), the Worcester Music Festival (1942), American Opera Society (1944), Syracuse University (1947), Mobile Opera (1948), Pittsburgh Savoyards (1948), Hiram College (1948), St. Louis Grand Opera (1949), Curtis Institute of Music (1950), Eastman School of Music (1950), Brigham Young University (1950), Stanford University (1951), St. Olaf College (1951), Cornell University (1951), and Ithaca College (1951). In 1942 it was performed in WOR's American Opera Festival which was sponsored by the United States Department of the Treasury. The High School of Music & Art mounted the opera at Hunter College in 1946; a performance which was broadcast on WNYC radio. In 1951 excerpts from the opera were performed in a Young People's Concerts by the New York Philharmonic under conductor Igor Buketoff.

In 1952 the work was given its European premiere in Paris by the Compagnie Lyrique. That same year the work was staged by Punch Opera in New York in a double bill with Jacques Offenbach's Une nuit blanche, and by the Milwaukee Chamber Opera. In 1953 the opera was mounted at Old Sturbridge Village for their summer festival with a cast that included Metropolitan Opera baritone Clifford Harvout as Webster and soprano Adelaide Bishop as Mary. In 1953 the opera was filmed for television and broadcast nationally on CBS. In 1955 the opera was recorded live on BBC Third Programme with baritone Jess Walters singing the role of Webster for the work's UK premiere.

In 1958 an LP recording of The Devil and Daniel Webster was released on Westminster Records. In 1959 it was mounted at the New York City Opera with a cast that included Joshua Hecht as Jabez Stone, Walter Cassel as Webster, Norman Kelley as Mr. Scratch, Emile Renan as Justice Hawthorne, and Arthur Newman as the Court Clerk. That same year the work was staged as the opening production of the Boston Arts Festival in a double bill with Lee Hoiby's The Scarf. Other stagings during the 1950s were given at the University of Georgia (1953), Hiram College (1955), Yale University (1955), Brooklyn College (1958), and Portland State College (1958).

The Seattle Opera staged the work in the 1960s with Don Collins as Webster, John Waggoner as Janet, and Jerry Landeen as Scratch. Other performances of the opera in the 1960s included staging by Maryland Baptist College (1961), New Hampshire Festival Opera (1962), Willamette University (1963), Kansas City Opera (1963), Glassboro State College (1964), Beaumont Civic Opera (1964), Colorado Springs Opera (1964), Drake University (1964), Laguna Beach Festival Opera (1965), University of Denver (1967), University of Florida (1968), Oberlin College (1968), and Fresno Pacific College (1968).

The opera was performed in Riverside, California by the Riverside Opera Association in 1976. In 1989 it was performed by the Lake George Opera. In 1991 the Bronx Opera staged the work in a double bill with Gilbert and Sullivan's Trial by Jury. In 1995 the opera was mounted by the Lyric Opera of Kansas City with Brian Steele as Webster, Joyce Guyer as Mary Stone, John Stephens as Jabez Stone, and Darren Keith Woods as Mr. Scratch. In 1998 the work was staged by Opera Theatre of Northern Virginia in Arlington with bass-baritone David Neal as Webster, tenor Doug Bowles as Scratch, and David Brundage as Jabez Stone. In 2000 the opera was performed at the Teatro Massimo in Palermo, Italy with Maurizio Lo Piccolo as Webster and Ugo Guagliardo as Jabez Stone.

The aria “I’ve Got a Ram, Goliath” has been performed in concerts and recitals by several singers, including bass Richard Hale, bass-baritone James Pease, and baritones Mordecai Bauman, Alfred Drake, Clifford Harvuot, and Sherrill Milnes. The aria “Mary’s Prayer” has also been used as a recital piece by sopranos and mezzo-sopranos.
