= Carl Fenton Orchestra =

American bandleader, composer, and musician

The Carl Fenton Orchestra was an American musical group formed by composer and radio musician Walter G. Haenschen.

== Name origin ==
The Carl Fenton Orchestra (AKA "Carl Fenton's Orchestra") was a title given to Brunswick Records studio bands through the 1920s. The name was invented by Brunswick music director Walter Gustave "Gus" Haenschen shortly after taking the position for their brand-new American division. Later, the name was taken by violinist Ruby (Rubin) Greenberg.

Haenschen, whose own name was considered ill-suited for commercial recordings, haphazardly chose the name "Fenton" after the town of Fenton, Missouri, near his hometown of St Louis, Missouri. He attended Washington University in St. Louis. He told an interviewer "How do you find a name? Just pull it out of a hat." He added that the name "Carl" was an anglicized spelling of a German relative who spelled it "Karl."

== Early recordings ==
The earliest songs recorded by Carl Fenton's Orchestra were Karavan and Romance, from October 1919. Brunswick Records released many "Carl Fenton" records, with various line-ups of musicians. The band was typically led by Haenschen in the studio, but was led by studio musician/conductor Rubin "Ruby" Greenberg during their occasional concerts.

== Orchestra change ==
Around the time that Haenschen left Brunswick Records in mid-1927, Greenberg purchased the rights to the Carl Fenton name. From 1928 to 1930, Greenberg was musical director for Gennett Records, where he recorded as "Carl Fenton's New Yorkers". Under the direction of Greenberg, the Carl Fenton Orchestra then moved to radio, where they co-starred with a young Bing Crosby from 1931 to 1932 on the CBS network (on tour the orchestra was named "Cremo Orchestra" after sponsor Cremo Cigars).

In 1932, Greenberg had his name legally changed to Carl Fenton. He continued to work as a music director for radio and theaters until his death in January 1942.

== Sources ==
- Carl Fenton
- Gus Haenschen
