= Jingo =

Jingo may refer to:

== People ==
- Empress Jingū (also Jingū or Jingō), a legendary empress of Japan
- Jingo Tobimatsu (飛松 甚吾; 1883–1945), Japanese chief administrator of the Kaishun Hospital

== Places ==
- Jingo, the main town on Rossel Island in Papua New Guinea
- Jingo, Kansas, a community in the United States
- Jingo, West Virginia, an unincorporated community in the United Statesù
- Jingo-ji, a Buddhist temple in Kyoto

== Music ==
- "Oh By Jingo!", a 1919 popular song
- "Jin-go-lo-ba" or "Jingo", a 1959 song by Babatunde Olatunji, covered by multiple artists

== Others ==
- By Jingo, a minced oath from the 17th century
- Jingo (novel), from the Discworld series

== See also ==
- Jingo-ji Tripiṭaka, a Japanese collection of the Tripiṭaka
- Jingo-keiun, Japanese era name
- Jingoism, aggressive nationalism
