= Hillsdale, Kansas =

- CDP
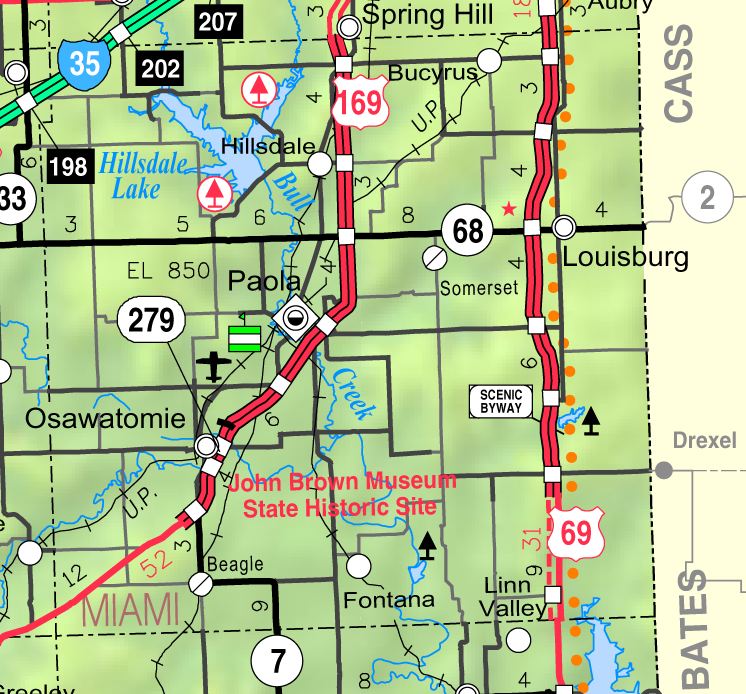
- KDOT map of Miami County (legend)

- Location within Kansas
- Coordinates: 38°39′35″N 94°51′1″W
- Country: United States
- State: Kansas
- County: Miami
- Elevation: 889 ft (271 m)

Population (2020)
  - Total: 247
- Time zone: UTC-6 (CST)
  - Summer (DST): UTC-5 (CDT)
- ZIP Code: 66036
- Area code: 913
- FIPS code: 20-32300
- GNIS ID: 2629161

Hillsdale is a census-designated place (CDP) in Miami County, Kansas, United States. As of the 2020 census, the population was 247. Hillsdale is located near U.S. Route 169 and K-7, 6 miles (9.7 km) north-northeast of Paola.

== History ==
Hillsdale, originally called Columbia, was laid out in 1869 when the railroad was extended to that point.

The first post office in Columbia, established in August 1868, was renamed Hillsdale in April 1870, and still has a post office with ZIP Code 66036.

== Demographics ==
Historical population
Census	Pop.	Note	%±
2020	247		—
U.S. Decennial Census

Hillsdale is part of the Kansas City metropolitan area.

The 2020 United States census counted 247 people, 103 households, and 71 families in Hillsdale. The population density was 161.9 per square mile (62.5/km^{2}). There were 115 housing units at an average density of 75.4 per square mile (29.1/km^{2}). The racial makeup was 88.66% (219) white or European American (88.66% non-Hispanic white), 0.4% (1) black or African-American, 0.4% (1) Native American or Alaska Native, 0.0% (0) Asian, 0.0% (0) Pacific Islander or Native Hawaiian, 0.81% (2) from other races, and 9.72% (24) from two or more races. Hispanic or Latino of any race was 4.05% (10) of the population.

Of the 103 households, 25.2% had children under the age of 18; 58.3% were married couples living together; 27.2% had a female householder with no spouse or partner present. 30.1% of households consisted of individuals and 11.7% had someone living alone who was 65 years of age or older. The average household size was 2.7 and the average family size was 3.0. The percent of those with a bachelor's degree or higher was estimated to be 35.6% of the population.

17.8% of the population was under the age of 18, 7.7% from 18 to 24, 19.8% from 25 to 44, 27.9% from 45 to 64, and 26.7% who were 65 years of age or older. The median age was 48.7 years. For every 100 females, there were 97.6 males. For every 100 females ages 18 and older, there were 93.3 males.

The 2016–2020 5-year American Community Survey estimates show that the median household income was $63,676 (with a margin of error of +/- $18,306) and the median family income was $64,632 (+/- $43,398). Males had a median income of $32,201 (+/- $23,110). The median income for those above 16 years old was $31,957 (+/- $7,155). Approximately, 0.0% of families and 5.3% of the population were below the poverty line, including 0.0% of those under the age of 18 and 0.0% of those ages 65 or over.

== Education ==
The community is served by Paola USD 368 public school district.

== See also ==
- Hillsdale Lake and Hillsdale State Park
