= Rockville's post =

Military post during Civil war

Rockville's Post
- southern Miami County, Kansas

Site information
- Type: U.S. Army post, local militia post
- Controlled by: various Army units from Kansas, local militia

Location
- Coordinates: 38.4325°N 94.6522°W

Site history
- Built: ca. August 1863
- In use: ca. August 1863 - ca. spring or summer 1865

Garrison information
- Past commanders: various, including Capt. Benjamin F. Simpson, Capt. Joel Huntoon
- Garrison: same

Rockville's post, in southern Miami County, Kansas, was established at the small town of Rockville, Kansas, founded in 1859 by pro-slavery settlers during the Bleeding Kansas era. Ant-slavery free-staters soon gained control of the town and it was loyal to the Union when the Civil War broke out in 1861. Rockville was located on the top of a hill surrounded by rolling plains. During the American Civil War, the area was almost bare of trees, allowing troops holding the town to see anyone coming from some distance away. Rockville's post was one of the many posts established in the War to help guard the Kansas-Missouri border area.

The first time a military presence was mentioned at Rockville was in August 1863, when probably fewer than fifty men garrisoned the post there. Nothing more was mentioned until February 1864, when twenty-five men were at Rockville. After that troops were possibly not always there, but they were there most of the time until October 1864.

In September 1864 Maj. Gen. Sterling Price invaded Missouri and the invasion quickly became a large raid, as Price failed to permanently hold any localities. Somewhere around this time a stockade was constructed around the town's stone church. A lookout tower was built at the top of the stockade. For a time all the residents of Rockville lived inside the stockade.

On October 25, 1864, Price's troops were spotted from the tower; some of the troops headed toward Rockville. The residents carried everything they could into the surrounding countryside and hid it. When Confederates reached the town, they raided the town and stockade, but Union troops were close behind. This prevented them from taking the time they needed to search the countryside.

After Price's raid, a company of troops returned to Rockville, but they probably soon permanently left as no further entries in the official records of the Civil War exist. The stockade, especially the tower, probably was used by the town until the end of the War. Rockville languished and eventually disappeared as a town. In 1993 only two apparently abandoned buildings remained and satellite imaging as of 2013 showed even those were gone.
