= Wagstaff =

Wagstaff may refer to:

== Places ==
- Wagstaff, Kansas, U.S.
- Wagstaff, New South Wales, Australia

== Fictional places ==
- Wagstaff School, in the American television series Bob's Burgers

== Other uses ==
- Wagstaff prime, in number theory

== People with the surname ==
- Alfred Wagstaff Jr. (1844–1921), New York politician
- Barry Wagstaff (born 1945), English association footballer
- Blanche Shoemaker Wagstaff (1888–1959), American poet
- Harold Wagstaff (1891–1939), English rugby league footballer
- Jesse Wagstaff (born 1986), Australian professional basketball player
- Julian Wagstaff (born 1970), Scottish music composer
- Ken Wagstaff (born 1942), English professional footballer
- Norma Wagstaff (born 1942), birth name of the wife of John Major
- Patty Wagstaff (born 1951), American aerobatic pilot
- Sam Wagstaff (1921–1987), American curator and collector
- Samuel S. Wagstaff Jr. (born 1945), American mathematician
- Scott Wagstaff (born 1990), English professional footballer
- Stuart Wagstaff (1925–2015), Australian television personality
- Tony Wagstaff (born 1944), English professional footballer
- Will Wagstaff (born c. 1960), British ornithologist and naturalist

=== Fictional characters ===
- Captain Wagstaff, in the Australian television series Are You Being Served?
- Prof. Quincy Adams Wagstaff and his son Frank Wagstaff, in Marx Brothers film Horse Feathers
- Randy Wagstaff, a character in the television series The Wire
- Robert Wagstaff, a character in the video game Don't Starve

=== Pseudonyms ===
- Simon Wagstaff, Esq., pseudonym of Anglo-Irish writer Jonathan Swift (1667–1745)

== See also ==
- Wagstaffe, a surname
