= Paola's post =

Paola's Post or Post Paola
- eastern Miami County, Kansas

Site information
- Type: U.S. Army post
- Controlled by: various units

Location
- Coordinates: 38.5798°N 94.8927°W

Site history
- Built: ca. December 1861
- In use: ca. December 1861 - August or September 1865

Garrison information
- Past commanders: Lieut. Col. William R. Judson, Maj. Thomas Kennedy, Col. Edward Lynde, Col. Charles W. Adams, Capt. Benjamin F. Simpson, Brig. Gen. Thomas McKean, Brig. Gen. W. H. M. Fishback, Col. Thomas Moonlight, Col. S. A. Drake, Maj. C. M. Butt, Col. G. A. Colton, Col. Preston B. Plumb, Maj. Gen. George Sykes
- Garrison: same

Paola's post, sometimes called Post Paola, in Miami County, Kansas, was located on the west side of Bull Creek, just west of Paola, Kansas. It was probably established in December 1861, as that was the first time it was mentioned. This post became one of the more important posts along the Kansas-Missouri border during the Civil War. It became a district headquarters in 1863. Later, in September 1864, it was designated a subdistrict headquarters, when the district headquarters was moved to Lawrence, Kansas. The military road from Fort Leavenworth to Fort Gibson ran through Paola, thus ensuring the post always had some importance.

The number of troops at Paola fluctuated several times during the Civil War. It was even temporarily abandoned at least once, which resulted in its being looted by Confederate guerrillas. This was on August 21, 1863. The previous night Confederate guerrilla leader William C. Quantrill led 400 guerrillas and Confederate Army recruits on a raid to Lawrence. There was much activity at Paola's post and the troops from the post moved into town to defend it against Quantrill. After raiding Lawrence, Quantrill moved toward Paola.

As the post was abandoned or was virtually so, one of his subordinates, William T. Anderson (nicknamed "Bloody Bill Anderson" years later), took some men into the post to get supplies. As it was a district headquarters, it had several hundred thousand dollars of military supplies. Quantrill himself was forced to move north of Paola after being surrounded for a time by Union troops.

In fall 1864 Confederate Maj. Gen. Sterling Price raided Missouri and this caused much activity at Paola's post. Men were moved into and out of Paola from the first of October until Price neared the area in late October. It was even feared Paola's post, which had considerable military stores, would be left defenseless. When Price was defeated in the Battle of Westport on October 23, he retreated south along the Kansas-Missouri border. The next day Price passed within 10 miles (16 km) of Paola, which had some troops left to defend it.

Through the rest of the Civil War, Paola's post had anywhere from one to three companies of soldiers. It took until June 1865 for the last Confederate guerrillas to put down their arms. In August or September 1865, with no need to have so many military posts in the area, Paola's post was deactivated.
