= Powell Observatory =

Astronomical observatory in Miami County, Kansas, U.S.

Coordinates: 38.6463°N 94.6999°W

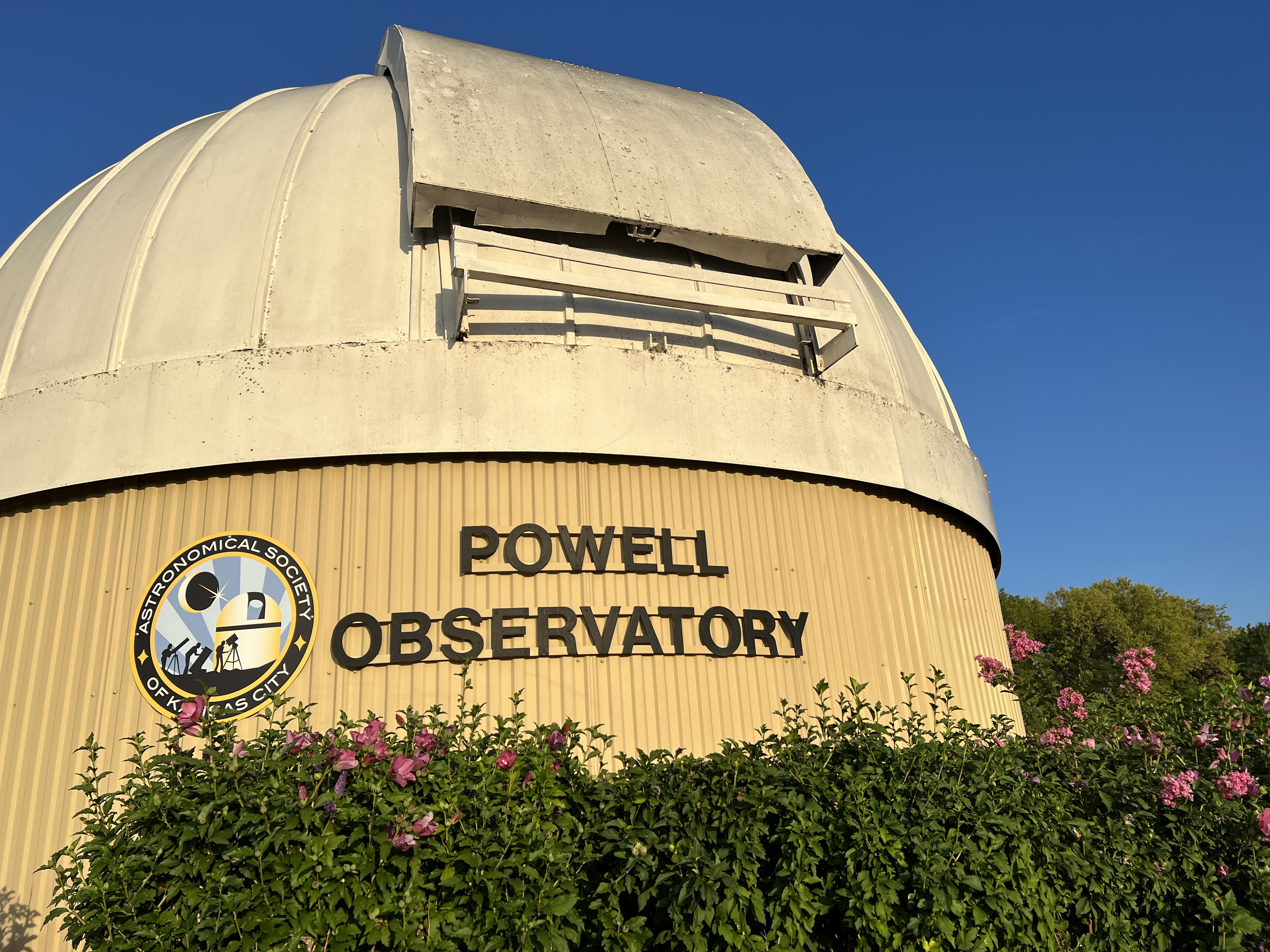
Powell Observatory 2023

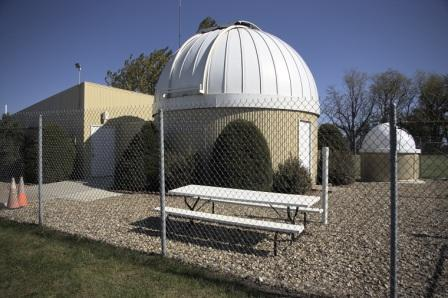
Powell Observatory

Powell Observatory is an astronomical observatory located near Louisburg in Miami County, Kansas. It features several large telescopes and is available for public viewing, for private use of Astronomical Society of Kansas City members, and for ongoing research projects.

The observatory, located in Lewis-Young Park just north of Louisburg, was built in 1984 by members of the Astronomical Society of Kansas City (ASKC). Its main telescope is a Ruisinger Newtonian reflector, with a single 30-inch (76 cm) objective (mirror), housed in a dome. The observatory also has a 16-inch (41 cm) telescope for public programs, a computer-controlled 12-inch (30 cm) telescope for research projects and member use, and a small conference/lecture room and visitor center.

Powell Observatory runs regular public programs every weekend from May through October. The telescope is open for public viewing of the night sky; it is one of the largest telescopes in the United States regularly open to the public for this purpose. The observatory is supported by ASKC membership dues, and by private and public donations.

== History ==
In April 1983, Mr. Charles S. Douglas, who, at the time, was a relatively new member of the Astronomical Society of Kansas City wrote an earnest letter to the Marjorie Powell Allen of the Powell Family Foundation in hopes of obtaining a grant for $20,000 in order to build a new observatory on land leased to the organization by the City of Louisburg, Kansas in Lewis-Young Park. Allen, remembering that her father, George E. Powell, who had established the family's foundation, Allen incrementally granted the organization their initial request which she generously expanded to nearly $48,000 to ensure the observatory would be equipped with restrooms and a computerized system for the extraordinary telescope built by the society's members which houses a nearly 30-inch mirror. Powell Observatory was opened and dedicated May 11, 1985 in a ceremony dedicating the Powell family name to the observatory.

During 2009, Powell Observatory hosted Saturday-night "Starbright" programs that began at dusk and included introductory and advanced lectures on astronomy by ASKC members and guest speakers, a tour of the observatory, and telescope viewing if the skies were clear. On many clear evenings and most weekends, ASKC members set up personal telescopes in Powell's courtyard and are available to give tours of the night sky and to answer questions.

Minor planet 25890 Louisburg is named after the home of this observatory.

== See also ==
- List of astronomical observatories
