= Spring Hill, Kansas =

- City
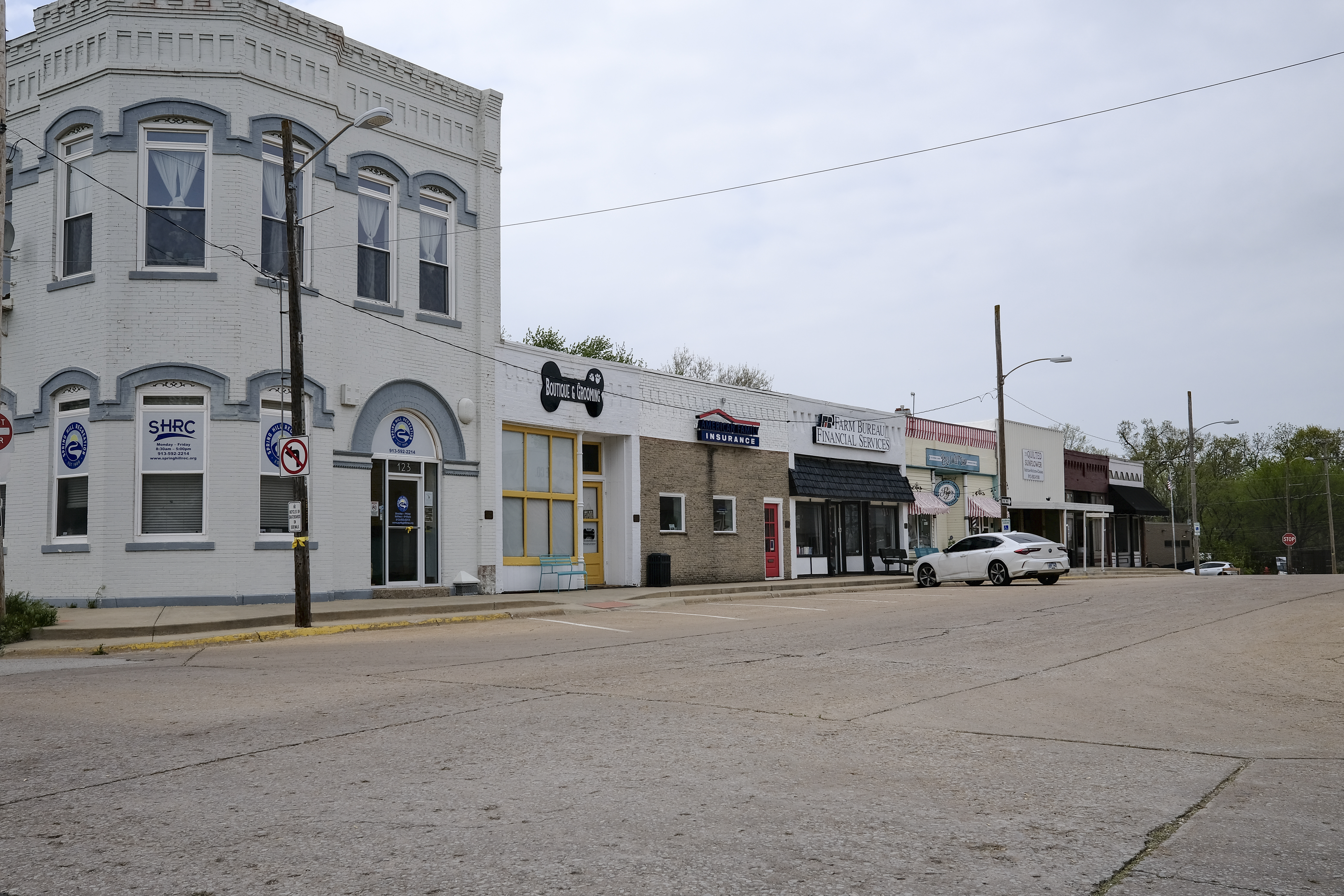
- Downtown (2022)

- Location within Johnson County and Kansas
- Interactive map of Spring Hill, Kansas
- Coordinates: 38°44′35″N 94°49′32″W
- Country: United States
- State: Kansas
- Counties: Johnson, Miami
- Founded: 1856
- Incorporated: 1857
- Named for: Spring Hill, Alabama

Government
  - Mayor: Chad Young

Area
  - Total: 9.46 sq mi (24.50 km^{2})
  - Land: 9.35 sq mi (24.22 km^{2})
  - Water: 0.11 sq mi (0.29 km^{2})
- Elevation: 1,063 ft (324 m)

Population (2020)
  - Total: 7,952
  - Estimate (2022): 9,242
  - Density: 988/sq mi (381.6/km^{2})
- Time zone: UTC-6 (CST)
  - Summer (DST): UTC-5 (CDT)
- ZIP Code: 66083
- Area code: 913
- FIPS code: 20-67625
- GNIS ID: 479558
- Website: springhillks.gov

Spring Hill is a city in Johnson and Miami counties in the U.S. state of Kansas, and part of the Kansas City Metropolitan Area. As of the 2020 census, the population of the city was 7,952, and was estimated to be 9,689 in 2023.

== History ==
In 1856, James B. Hovey named the community after a town near Mobile, Alabama. "Being somewhat enthusiastic in my estimation of its future, it having all advantages of timber and water, and on a line that must be traveled between Olathe and Paola, I concluded to myself, as there was no one else to conclude with, that this was a good place for a town." – J.B. Hovey, 1857 Hovey served as the communities first postmaster. Also that year, Hovey built the first building in town, the Spring Hill Hotel. The two-story structure, also known as the "Old Traveler's Rest", was located on the highest elevation in town.

In January 1859 Celia Ann Dayton, a doctor in Vermont, became the first woman doctor in the state of Kansas by moving to Spring Hill. She arrived with her adopted son Hiram Eugene, also a doctor, and her husband Amos arrived a few months later. Hiram was killed in January 1862 during the American Civil War after being discovered as a spy for the Union. Also in 1862, Celia divorced her husband, which was very uncommon for the time period. Celia frequently aided black refugees, and is reported to have been part of the Underground Railroad. In the fall of 1862, Spring Hill avoided Quantrill's Raiders entering the town when a farmer talked to them on their way. He calmly convinced them there were soldiers in town, when there were not. This deterred them from continuing. However, a year later in 1863, the Quantrill Raiders did march on Spring Hill, looting businesses in town and stealing from local farmers. At least one citizen was killed.

By the 1870s, Spring Hill was growing in population and commerce. However, a railroad to come right through the town wanted to bypass Spring Hill unless it paid $15,000 to grade the land there. The residents didn't want to share the costs, and the tracks were moved to approximately a half-mile east of the original town square. The town's businesses then quickly moved to be closer to the train depot and tracks.

In 1874, the country's economic depression hit Spring Hill. Also that year, swarms of grasshoppers devoured plant life, then moved on to items such as clothes, blankets and shoes. Even leather harnesses, pitch fork handles, and fence posts were not immune to them. As a result, water sources were polluted, and gardens and crops were devastated. Livestock were nearly inedible.

In the 1920s the Spring Hill Rural High School District was established, and in 1926, the original city jail was constructed by A. H. Starbuck. By the 1950s, most of the rural area surrounding Spring Hill also had electricity. In the 1960s Spring Hill's elementary and high school merged due to a state law requiring public schooling for kindergarten through the 12th grade. Spring Hill's growth had nearly stopped by the 1980s until community leaders decided to focus on attracting industry to develop there. This strategy drew new residents, followed by increased retail and service businesses.

On May 20, 1957, around 7:00 p.m., an F5 tornado, known as the Ruskin Heights tornado, struck Spring Hill and surrounding towns. Elston Steel Factory, along with 21 homes and 18 barns, were destroyed in the storm, with most damage occurring between Allen and King Street, north of Jackson Street. The cemetery also received severe damage to the trees and gravestones. The only fatalities in Spring Hill were of the Davis family, including Isam Davis, his wife Barbara, and their daughters Tamara and Pamela (ages five and six). A neighbor reported they were killed trying to leave their home and make it to their station wagon to escape the storm. Their home was completely destroyed by the tornado and their bodies were found close to 207th Street and US 169 Highway (present day Webster Street). Davis Street in Spring Hill is named after the family.

Incorporated in 1857, Spring Hill celebrated its sesquicentennial in 2007, honoring its history. Today, many community events occur annually, and include The King of the Hill Barbeque, the Spring Hill Fall Festival, and Hometown Holidays.

== Geography ==
According to the United States Census Bureau, the city has a total area of 9.46 square miles (24.50 km^{2}), of which 9.35 square miles (24.22 km^{2}) is land and 0.11 square miles (0.28 km^{2}) is water.

== Demographics ==
Historical population
Census	Pop.	Note	%±
1880	502		—
1890	573		14.1%
1900	580		1.2%
1910	605		4.3%
1920	555		−8.3%
1930	566		2.0%
1940	489		−13.6%
1950	619		26.6%
1960	909		46.8%
1970	1,186		30.5%
1980	2,005		69.1%
1990	2,191		9.3%
2000	2,727		24.5%
2010	5,437		99.4%
2020	7,952		46.3%
2025 (est.)	10,777		35.5%
U.S. Decennial Census; 2010-2020

Spring Hill city, Kansas – Racial and ethnic composition Note: the US Census treats Hispanic/Latino as an ethnic category. This table excludes Latinos from the racial categories and assigns them to a separate category. Hispanics/Latinos may be of any race.
Race / Ethnicity (NH = Non-Hispanic)	Pop 2000	Pop 2010	Pop 2020	% 2000	% 2010	% 2020
White alone (NH)	2,571	4,977	6,872	94.28%	91.54%	86.42%
Black or African American alone (NH)	22	83	155	0.81%	1.53%	1.95%
Native American or Alaska Native alone (NH)	23	26	29	0.84%	0.48%	0.36%
Asian alone (NH)	4	38	55	0.15%	0.70%	0.69%
Native Hawaiian or Pacific Islander alone (NH)	1	1	1	0.04%	0.02%	0.01%
Other race alone (NH)	5	2	33	0.18%	0.04%	0.41%
Mixed race or Multiracial (NH)	25	94	404	0.92%	1.73%	5.08%
Hispanic or Latino (any race)	76	216	403	2.79%	3.97%	5.07%
Total	2,727	5,437	7,952	100.00%	100.00%	100.00%

=== 2020 census ===
As of the 2020 census, Spring Hill had a population of 7,952, with 2,763 households and 2,133 families residing in the city. The median age was 35.2 years. 29.8% of residents were under the age of 18 and 10.8% of residents were 65 years of age or older. For every 100 females there were 98.7 males, and for every 100 females age 18 and over there were 93.1 males age 18 and over.

90.2% of residents lived in urban areas, while 9.8% lived in rural areas.

Of the city's households, 43.2% had children under the age of 18 living in them. 64.1% were married-couple households, 11.7% were households with a male householder and no spouse or partner present, and 17.5% were households with a female householder and no spouse or partner present. About 18.0% of all households were made up of individuals and 6.3% had someone living alone who was 65 years of age or older.

There were 2,906 housing units, of which 4.9% were vacant. The homeowner vacancy rate was 2.1% and the rental vacancy rate was 5.3%.

Racial composition as of the 2020 census
Race	Number	Percent
White	7,000	88.0%
Black or African American	156	2.0%
American Indian and Alaska Native	33	0.4%
Asian	55	0.7%
Native Hawaiian and Other Pacific Islander	2	0.0%
Some other race	129	1.6%
Two or more races	577	7.3%

Income and poverty

The 2016–2020 5-year American Community Survey estimates show that the median household income was $85,244 (with a margin of error of +/- $10,462) and the median family income $94,920 (+/- $11,811). Males had a median income of $47,883 (+/- $7,073) versus $32,025 (+/- $2,687) for females. The median income for those above 16 years old was $38,887 (+/- $3,700). Approximately, 6.2% of families and 7.5% of the population were below the poverty line, including 6.7% of those under the age of 18 and 6.4% of those ages 65 or over.

2010 census

As of the 2010 census, there were 5,437 people, 1,919 households, and 1,447 families residing in the city. The population density was 638.1 inhabitants per square mile (246.4/km^{2}). There were 2,069 housing units at an average density of 242.8 per square mile (93.7/km^{2}). The racial makeup of the city was 93.7% White, 1.6% African American, 0.6% Native American, 0.7% Asian, 0.9% from other races, and 2.5% from two or more races. Hispanic or Latino of any race were 4.0% of the population.

There were 1,919 households, of which 46.3% had children under the age of 18 living with them, 60.7% were married couples living together, 10.0% had a female householder with no husband present, 4.7% had a male householder with no wife present, and 24.6% were non-families. 20.5% of all households were made up of individuals, and 8% had someone living alone who was 65 years of age or older. The average household size was 2.81 and the average family size was 3.26.

The median age in the city was 32.3 years. 32.2% of residents were under the age of 18; 5.5% were between the ages of 18 and 24; 34% were from 25 to 44; 19.6% were from 45 to 64; and 8.6% were 65 years of age or older. The gender makeup of the city was 49.9% male and 50.1% female.

== Arts and culture ==
Today, many community events occur annually in Spring Hill, and include The King of the Hill Barbeque, the Spring Hill Fall Festival, and Hometown Holidays. Also located in Spring Hill is a golf course, Sycamore Ridge, where several of Spring Hill's community organizations and businesses hold golf tournaments.

The Johnson County Library includes 13 locations throughout Johnson County, including the Spring Hill Library.

== Government ==
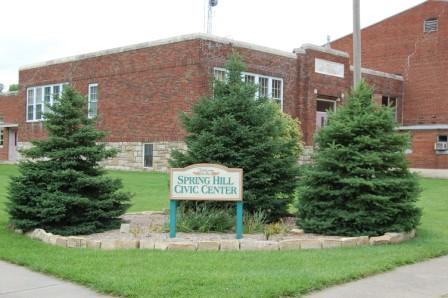
Spring Hill's Civic Center (2008)

The Spring Hill government consists of a mayor and five council members.

== Education ==
The community is served by Spring Hill USD 230 public school district, which includes 5 elementary schools, 3 middle schools, and 1 high school. Schools included in the district are:

- Prairie Creek Elementary School (grades K–5)
- Spring Hill Elementary School (grades K–5)
- Wolf Creek Elementary School (grades K–5)
- Timber Sage Elementary School (grades K–5)
- Dayton Creek Elementary School (grades K–5)
- Spring Hill Middle School (grades 6–8)
- Woodland Spring Middle School (grades 6–8)
- Forest Spring Middle School (grades 6–8)
- Spring Hill High School (grades 9–12)

== Notable people ==
- Curly Brown (1888–1968), baseball pitcher.
- Gary Burrell (1937–2019), co-founder and chairman emeritus of Garmin.
- Stephen Chamberlin (1889–1971), U.S. Army Lieutenant General, recipient of the Navy Cross.
- Ula Sharon (1905-1993), american dancer.
- Don Sowers (1883–1942), academic, consultant, and public servant

== See also ==
- Hillsdale Lake and Hillsdale State Park
