= Bernice Boeschenstein =

American painter (1906–1951)

- Born: May 19, 1906; Louisburg, Kansas
- Died: August 22, 1951 (aged 45); St. Louis, Missouri
- Known for: Painting

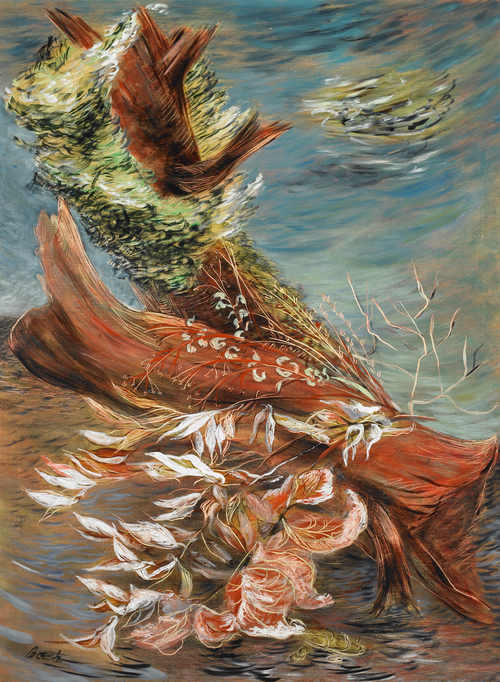
Ozark Bouquet 1941

Bernice Boeschenstein (1906–1951) was an American painter and educator.

Boeschenstein was born on May 19, 1906 in Louisburg, Kansas. She attended the Kansas State Teachers College of Hays, the St. Louis School of Fine Arts and the University of Illinois Urbana-Champaign. Boeschenstein died on August 22, 1951 in St. Louis, Missouri.

Boeschenstein was a member of the St. Louis Artists' Guild. Her work was included in the 1938 Midwestern Artists' Exhibition at the Kansas City Art Institute. Her work is in the collection of the Saint Louis Art Museum.
