= Ula Sharon =

American dancer

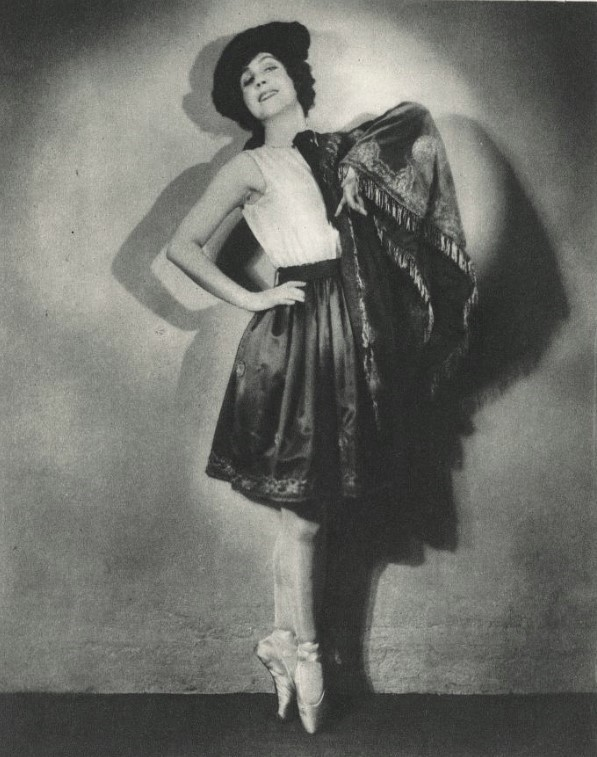
- Ula Sharon in Song of the Flame (1926)
- Born: March 17, 1905; Spring Hill, Kansas, U.S.
- Died: January 19, 1993 (age 87); Kansas City, Missouri, U.S.
- Other names: Ula Sharon Robinson, Ula Sharon Bergfeldt
- Occupations: Dancer, educator, arts administrator

Ula Sharon Robinson Bergfeldt (March 17, 1905 – January 19, 1993), known professionally as Ula Sharon, was an American dancer. She danced in shows on the Broadway and London stages, and was founder and artistic director of the Kansas City Dance Theater. She was co-founder of the Vedanta Society of Kansas City.

== Early life ==
Ula Robinson was born in Spring Hill, Kansas, the daughter of John Mason Robinson and Lilleth Sharon Robinson. Her father was a civil engineer. In 1916, young Robinson toured Australia as a vaudeville performer, accompanied by her parents.

== Career ==
While still in her teens, Sharon made her New York debut in May 1920, in a ballet recital at Aeolian Hall. "A bit too heavy, a lack of grace, but great agility of toe manipulation" were the observations of one critic at her debut. But another publication noted that she was "a real dancer, not an improvising amateur, overburdened with 'original' interpretive ideas." Because she was so young, a guardian was appointed, to allow her to sign contracts for her work.

Sharon danced in several Broadway shows, including Broadway Brevities of 1920, The Greenwich Village Follies (1922, 1923), Music Box Revue (1924), Song of the Flame (1925), and She's My Baby (1928). She was also in London productions of Sunny (1926) and Friml's The Three Musketeers (1930). Fellow dancer Ruth Page described Sharon's skills en pointe: "Ula Sharon would hop for what seemed like a half hour on one toe—you could shut your eyes and take a little rest and when you opened them there was Ula still hopping."

In 1921, Sharon was featured on the cover of The Tatler, and she drove a battery-powered car, billed as "The Smallest Automobile". She endorsed a "nerve tonic", Phosferine, in print advertisements.

Later in life, Sharon taught dance classes at her own studio in Kansas City. In 1954 she was co-founder and first artistic director of the Kansas City Dance Theater. She was co-founder of the Vedanta Society of Kansas City. She and her husband were followers of Swami Satprakashananda, head of the Vedanta Society of St. Louis, and hosted Vedanta Society meetings in their home.

== Personal life ==
Sharon married her dancing partner, Carl Randall, in 1924; they divorced in 1928. She later married businessman William Harold ("Perky") Bergfeldt. They had a son, William. Her husband died in 1971, and she died in 1993, in Kansas City, Missouri, at the age of 87. There is a collection of her papers in the State Historical Society of Missouri.
