= Block, Kansas =

- Unincorporated community
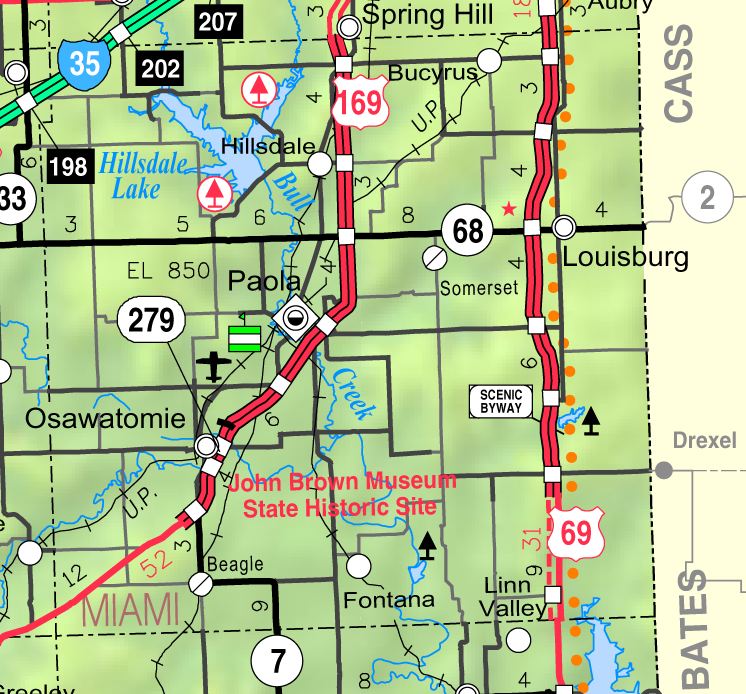
- KDOT map of Miami County (legend)

- Location within Kansas Location within the United States
- Coordinates: 38°30′18″N 94°48′29″W
- Country: United States
- State: Kansas
- County: Miami
- Elevation: 869 ft (265 m)
- Time zone: UTC-6 (CST)
  - Summer (DST): UTC-5 (CDT)
- Area code: 913
- FIPS code: 20-07310
- GNIS ID: 479741

Block is an unincorporated community in Miami County, Kansas, United States.

== History ==
The community is also known as Block Corners.
