= Wea, Kansas =

- Unincorporated community
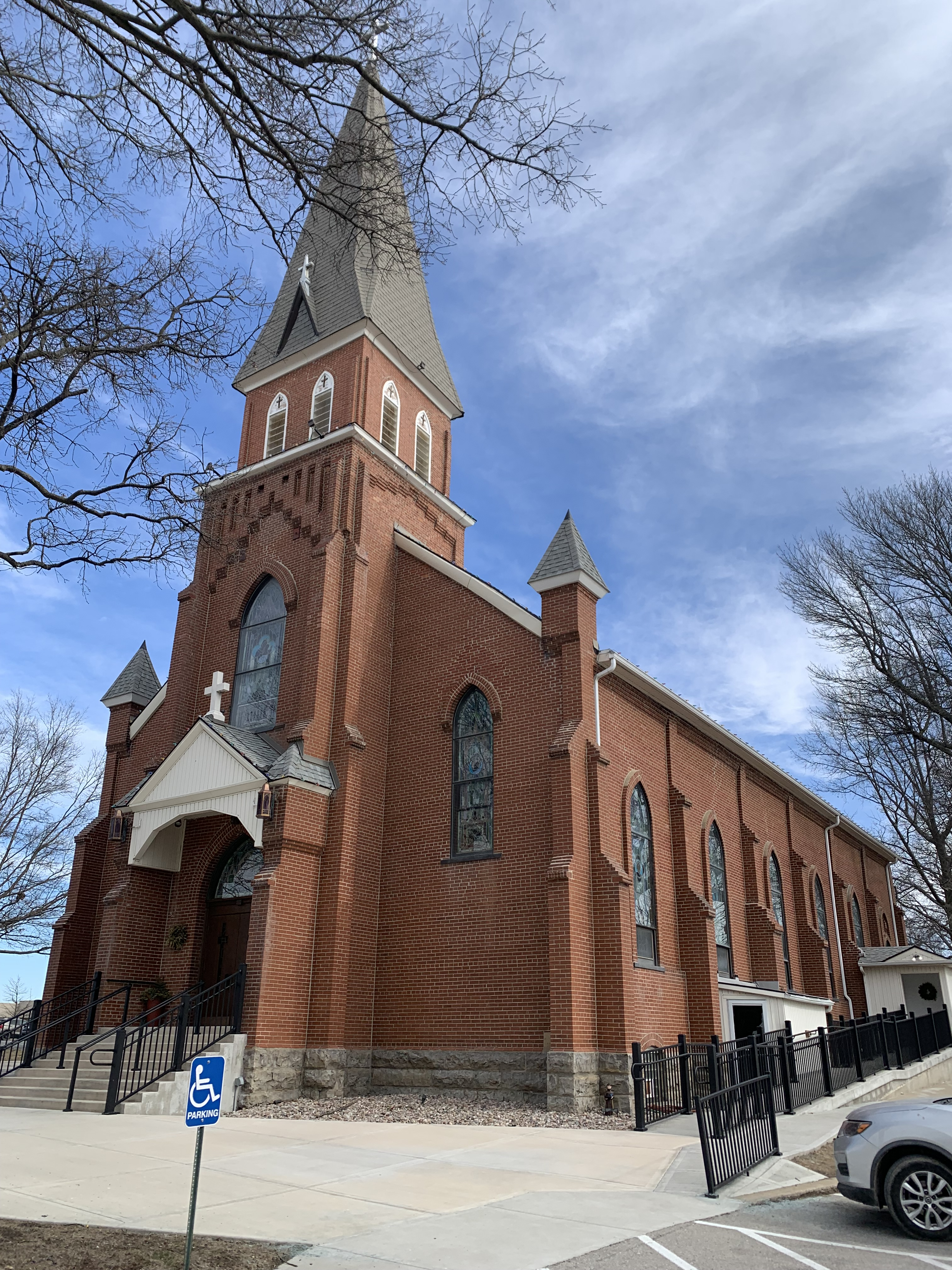
- Holy Rosary Church at Wea (2026)

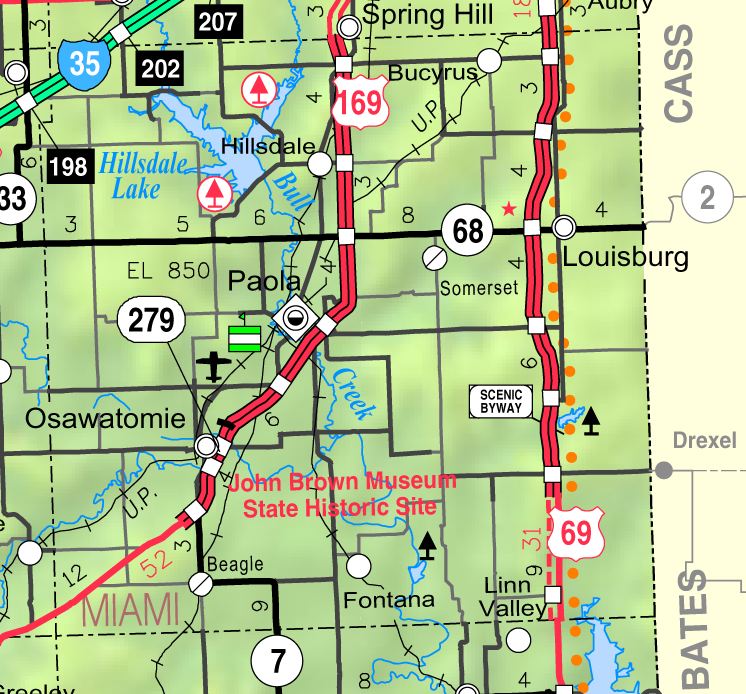
- KDOT map of Miami County (legend)

- Location within Kansas Location within the United States
- Coordinates: 38°42′55″N 94°40′01″W
- Country: United States
- State: Kansas
- County: Miami
- Elevation: 1,086 ft (331 m)
- Time zone: UTC-6 (CST)
  - Summer (DST): UTC-5 (CDT)
- Area code: 913
- FIPS code: 20-76200
- GNIS ID: 479415

Wea is an unincorporated community in Miami County, Kansas, United States. It is part of the Kansas City metropolitan area.

== History ==
The post office in Wea closed in 1903.

This community was named for the Wea Tribe that was part of the Illiniwek Confederacy that came to this reservation land in 1832 along with the Piankishaw, Peoria, and Kaskaskia Tribes.

The Kansas Nebraska Act of 1854 brought squatters who forced land cessions upon these four tribes until they removed to Indian Territory in 1867.

== Education ==
Wea High School mascot was the Eagles.
