= Somerset, Kansas =

Unincorporated community in Miami County, Kansas

- CDP
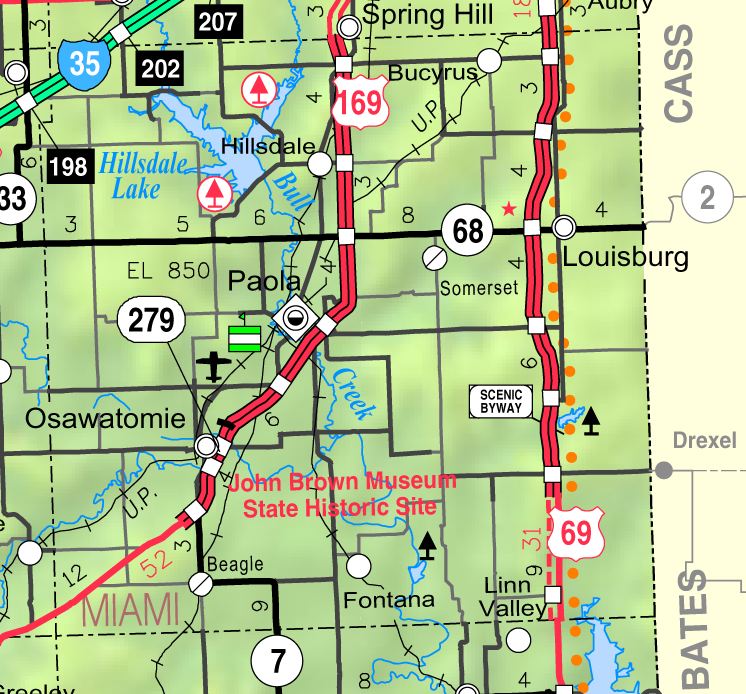
- KDOT map of Miami County (legend)

- Location within Kansas Location within the United States
- Coordinates: 38°36′18″N 94°46′8″W
- Country: United States
- State: Kansas
- County: Miami
- Elevation: 955 ft (291 m)

Population (2020)
  - Total: 90
- Time zone: UTC-6 (CST)
  - Summer (DST): UTC-5 (CDT)
- Area code: 913
- FIPS code: 20-66475
- GNIS ID: 2806561

Somerset is a census-designated place (CDP) in Miami County, Kansas, United States. As of the 2020 census, the population was 90.

== Demographics ==
Historical population
Census	Pop.	Note	%±
2020	90		—
U.S. Decennial Census

== Education ==
The community is served by Paola USD 368 public school district.
