= Louisburg, Kansas =

- City
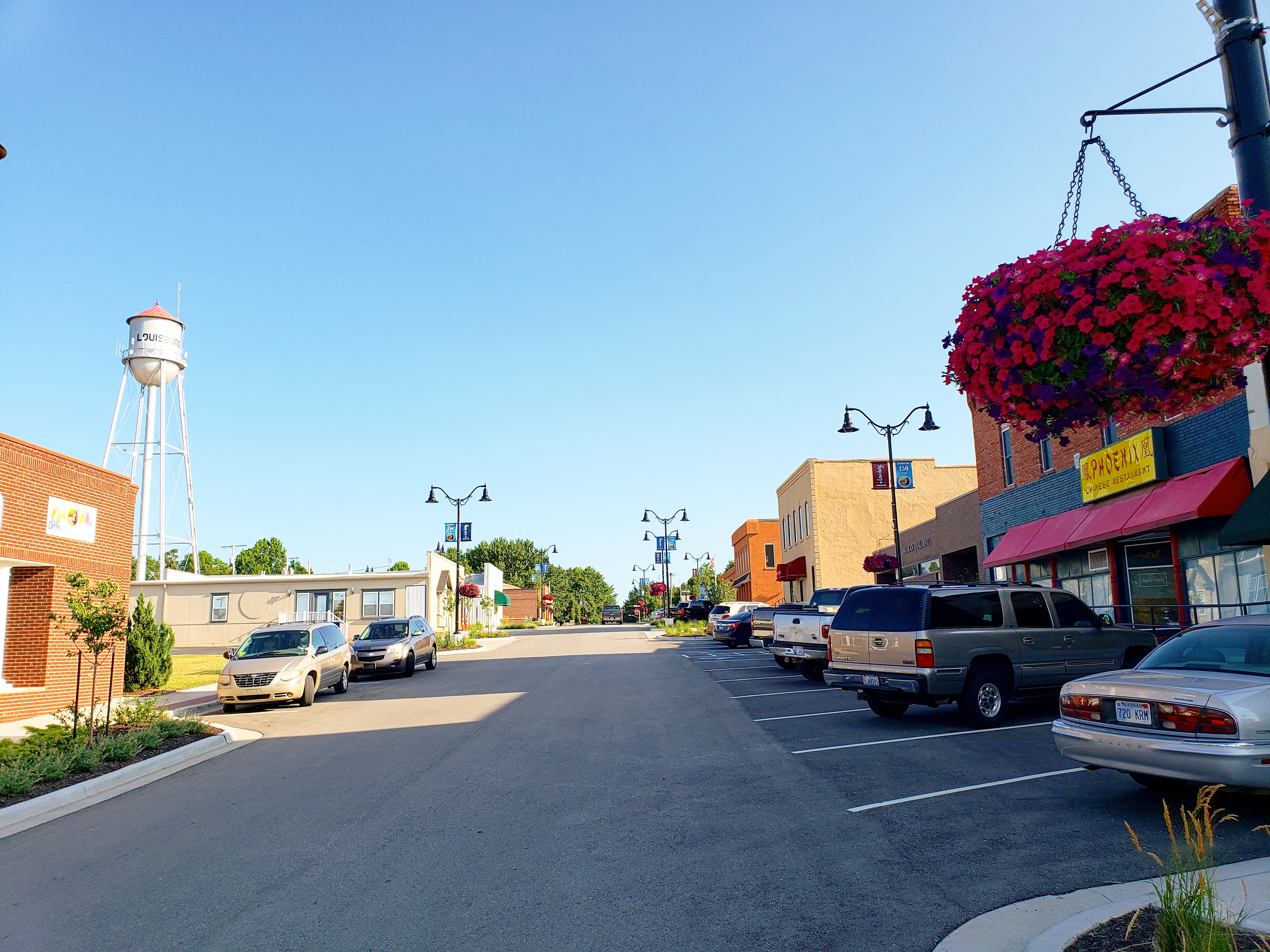
- Downtown Louisburg (2018)

- Location within Miami County and Kansas

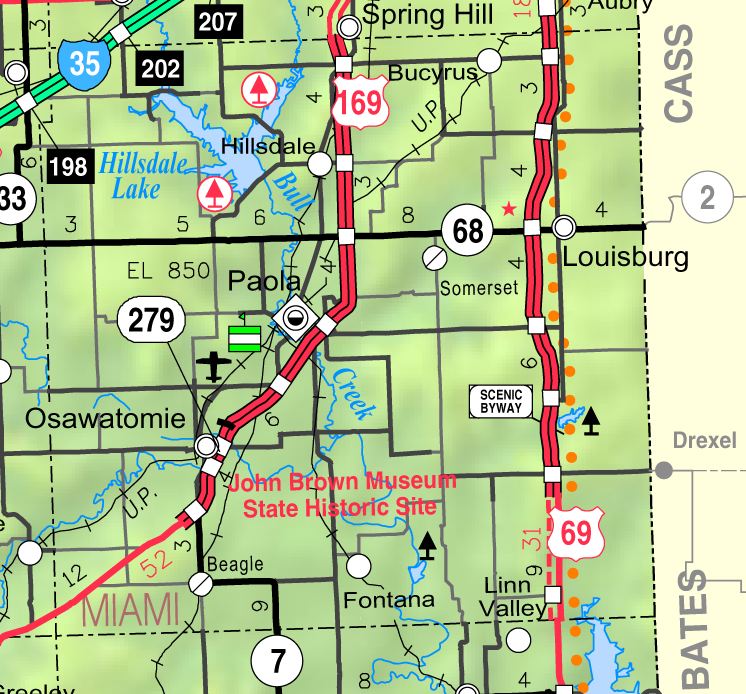
- KDOT map of Miami County (legend)
- Coordinates: 38°37′13″N 94°40′38″W
- Country: United States
- State: Kansas
- County: Miami

Government
  - Mayor: Donna Cook

Area
  - Total: 5.01 sq mi (12.98 km^{2})
  - Land: 4.89 sq mi (12.66 km^{2})
  - Water: 0.12 sq mi (0.32 km^{2})
- Elevation: 1,083 ft (330 m)

Population (2020)
  - Total: 4,969
  - Estimate (2021): 4,994
  - Density: 1,021.3/sq mi (394.3/km^{2})
- Time zone: UTC-6 (CST)
  - Summer (DST): UTC-5 (CDT)
- ZIP Code: 66053
- Area code: 913
- FIPS code: 20-42875
- GNIS ID: 485615
- Website: louisburgkansas.gov

Louisburg is a city in Miami County, Kansas, United States. As of the 2020 census, the population of the city was 4,969.

== History ==
=== 19th century ===
Prior to the American Civil War, the land of what is now called Louisburg was part of an area reserved for members of various tribes of Native Americans who were ceding their lands in Missouri, Illinois, and Indiana. Settling there were the Peoria, Wea, Piankeshaw, and Kaskaskia tribes which together eventually became the Confederated Tribe of Peoria. Traders and missionaries often visited the area, and by 1854 Euro-American farmers began moving nearby, establishing homes. Upon the organization of the state of Kansas in 1861, the Confederated Tribes were being charged with taxes, and the new state laws conflicted with their own. By 1866, following the Civil War, the government moved the Confederated Tribe of Peoria to Oklahoma, and the land they once occupied was sold to settlers. A community of homes resulted by 1867, and was called St. Louis. Soon, it was often referred to as New St. Louis or Little St. Louis in an effort to distinguish it from St. Louis.

From 1868 to 1870, the settlement of Little St. Louis grew to include businesses and churches, and a railroad depot was to be completed. Because the Missouri, Kansas, and Texas Railroad (MKT Railroad) would be coming to serve the community, and to avoid additional confusion, Little St. Louis was renamed Louisburg in 1870. The railroad depot was completed by 1871, and Louisburg's first school opened the same year. The community had some disorder during this time. As a town near the border, there remained conflicts between Kansas Jayhawkers and Missouri Raiders. In addition, the railroad tracks running through the community divided it into north and south areas. Circa 1875, many businesses and homes were moved from north of the railroad to the south, and formed what was to become downtown Louisburg.

Louisburg was incorporated as a city of the third class November 3, 1882, and held its first city election two weeks later on November 17, 1882. The population was listed as 400, and 141 of those residents voted in the first election.

=== 20th century ===
In the early 1900s, Louisburg's downtown had a variety of businesses such as retail stores, supply stores, livery stables, a hotel, and large nurseries. By 1910, the population was 603, and Louisburg was known as a good supply town for agricultural districts. By the 1920s, the town also had a gas station, an automobile ownership and traffic through town had increased. By the late 1950s, the MKT Railroad ended its service to Louisburg, but because K-68 went through town and US Highway 69 and K-68 intersected near town, growth continued.

In October 1912, an unsolved murder in the community took place as the town's postmaster at the time, George McElheny, was shot twice by a 12-gauge shotgun at his home. Several people were accused of the murder, including his wife, after she admitted an affair with one of the accused, but after intense trials and no hard evidence the case was dropped, and no one ever admitted to the murder. In later years, the murder was almost forgotten until Joe Towne, one of the community leaders, grew interested in the subject and studied it and interviewed those who remembered the tragic situation and wrote true crime novel, "Tongues on Fire".

== Geography ==
According to the United States Census Bureau, the city has a total area of 6.12 square miles (15.85 km^{2}), of which 5.57 square miles (14.43 km^{2}) is land and 0.55 square miles (1.42 km^{2}) is water.

== Area attractions ==
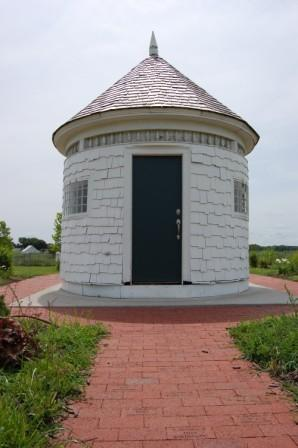
The Little Round House (2008)

=== Little Round House ===
The Little Round House was originally an addition to a front porch for a Victorian-style house in the nearby town of Paola, and was called such because it was indeed round in shape. Because of increased truck traffic from Missouri on K-68 through town, Louisburg was contacted by the State of Kansas about needing an inspection station. As a solution, the Little Round House was moved to Louisburg in the 1930s to serve as a border checkpoint office. As years passed, the Little Round House became a home to a variety of small businesses, and had been used as temporary housing during World War II. The shape and size aided in it becoming a landmark to Louisburg. In 2005, The Little Round House was moved from its original location to the Louisburg City Lake, and has been restored by the community due to its historical value to the town.

=== Frontier Military Scenic Byway ===
Along the west side of Louisburg and close to U.S. Route 69 runs part of the Frontier Military Scenic Byway, a 168-mile (270 km)-long route from near Leavenworth to the border of Oklahoma. The byway closely follows a road originally built between 1838 and 1844 that was used to transport soldiers and supplies from Fort Leavenworth in Kansas to Fort Scott in Kansas and to Fort Gibson in Oklahoma.

== Demographics ==
Historical population
Census	Pop.	Note	%±
1880	499		—
1890	760		52.3%
1900	665		−12.5%
1910	603		−9.3%
1920	556		−7.8%
1930	616		10.8%
1940	590		−4.2%
1950	677		14.7%
1960	862		27.3%
1970	1,033		19.8%
1980	1,744		68.8%
1990	1,964		12.6%
2000	2,576		31.2%
2010	4,315		67.5%
2020	4,969		15.2%
2021 (est.)	4,994		0.5%
U.S. Decennial Census

Louisburg is part of the Kansas City metropolitan area.

=== 2020 census ===
As of the 2020 census, Louisburg had a population of 4,969, with 1,841 households and 1,315 families. The population density was 1,018.4 per square mile (393.2/km^{2}). There were 1,894 housing units at an average density of 388.2 per square mile (149.9/km^{2}).

The median age was 36.2 years. 29.8% of residents were under the age of 18, 6.7% were from 18 to 24, 27.3% were from 25 to 44, 21.5% were from 45 to 64, and 14.6% were 65 years of age or older. For every 100 females there were 91.3 males, and for every 100 females age 18 and over there were 87.6 males age 18 and over. 0.0% of residents lived in urban areas, while 100.0% lived in rural areas.

There were 1,841 households, of which 41.1% had children under the age of 18 living in them. Of all households, 55.7% were married-couple households, 14.1% were households with a male householder and no spouse or partner present, and 24.8% were households with a female householder and no spouse or partner present. About 24.9% of all households were made up of individuals and 12.5% had someone living alone who was 65 years of age or older. The average household size was 2.7 and the average family size was 3.3.

Of housing units, 2.8% were vacant. The homeowner vacancy rate was 1.3% and the rental vacancy rate was 3.5%.

Racial composition as of the 2020 census
Race	Number	Percent
White	4,535	91.3%
Black or African American	27	0.5%
American Indian and Alaska Native	11	0.2%
Asian	33	0.7%
Native Hawaiian and Other Pacific Islander	2	0.0%
Some other race	36	0.7%
Two or more races	325	6.5%
Hispanic or Latino (of any race)	181	3.6%

The non-Hispanic white population was 89.66%.

=== Demographic estimates ===
The percent of those with a bachelor's degree or higher was estimated to be 16.8% of the population.

=== Income and poverty ===
The 2016–2020 5-year American Community Survey estimates show that the median household income was $77,182 (with a margin of error of +/- $17,473) and the median family income was $87,152 (+/- $8,373). Males had a median income of $57,143 (+/- $16,312) versus $35,573 (+/- $4,940) for females. The median income for those above 16 years old was $39,977 (+/- $7,955). Approximately, 10.4% of families and 7.4% of the population were below the poverty line, including 3.9% of those under the age of 18 and 33.5% of those ages 65 or over.

=== 2010 census ===
As of the census of 2010, there were 4,315 people, 1,583 households, and 1,148 families residing in the city. The population density was 774.7 inhabitants per square mile (299.1/km^{2}). There were 1,718 housing units at an average density of 308.4 per square mile (119.1/km^{2}). The racial makeup of the city was 96.6% White, 0.4% African American, 0.4% Native American, 0.3% Asian, 0.1% Pacific Islander, 0.8% from other races, and 1.5% from two or more races. Hispanic or Latino of any race were 3.3% of the population.

There were 1,583 households, of which 41.9% had children under the age of 18 living with them, 58.2% were married couples living together, 11.1% had a female householder with no husband present, 3.2% had a male householder with no wife present, and 27.5% were non-families. 23.6% of all households were made up of individuals, and 8.2% had someone living alone who was 65 years of age or older. The average household size was 2.67 and the average family size was 3.19.

The median age in the city was 33.9 years. 30.9% of residents were under the age of 18; 5.6% were between the ages of 18 and 24; 31.4% were from 25 to 44; 20.9% were from 45 to 64; and 11.2% were 65 years of age or older. The gender makeup of the city was 48.1% male and 51.9% female.

== Parks and recreation ==
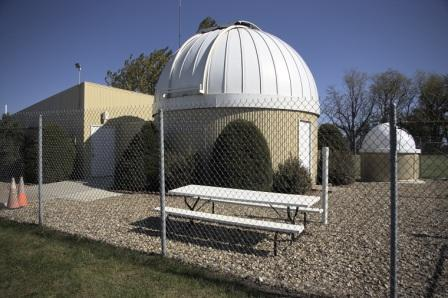
Powell Observatory (2008)

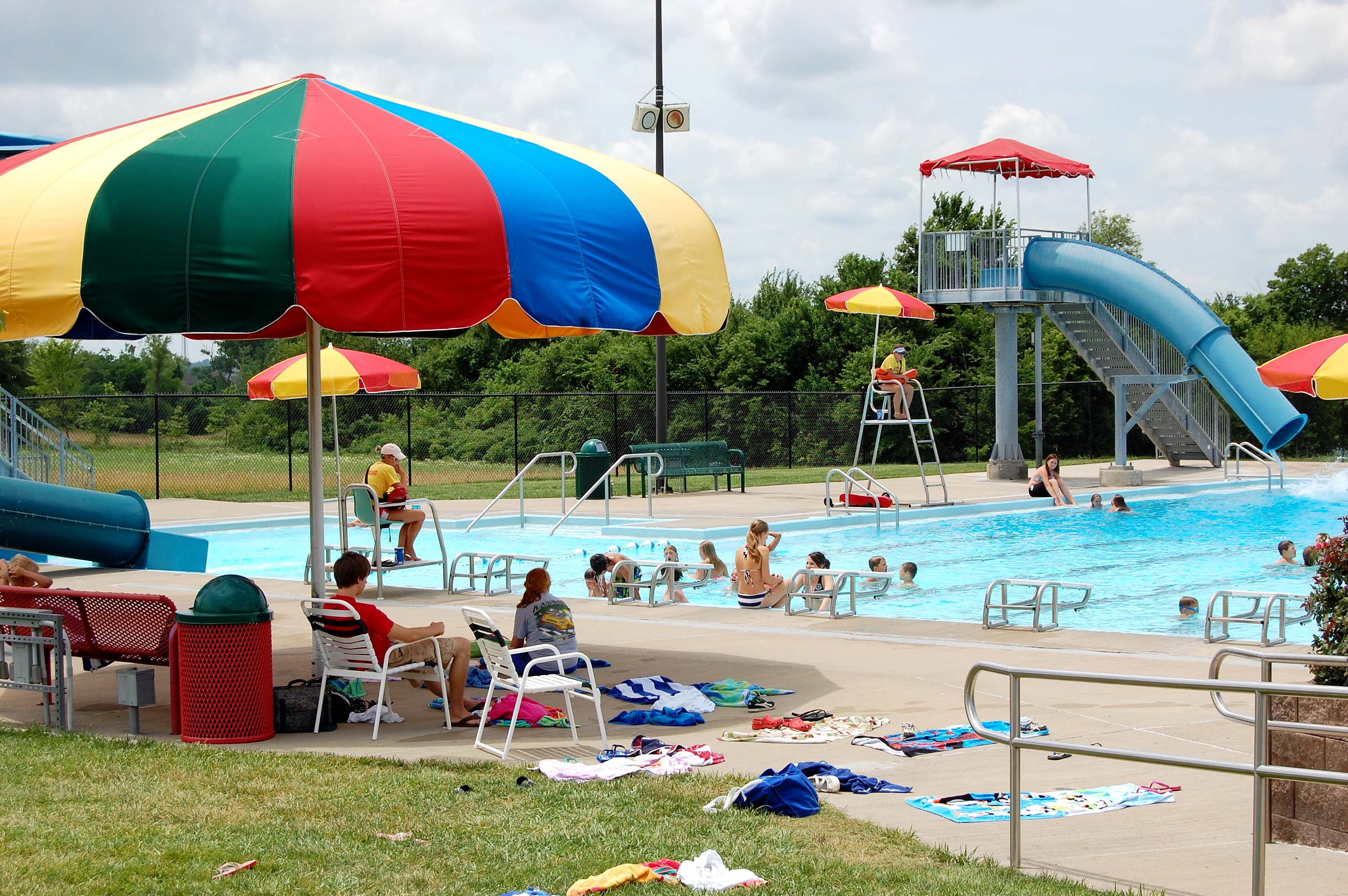
Louisburg Aquatic Center (2008)

Recreation in Louisburg includes several options. The Middle Creek State Fishing Lake is nearby for fishing, and the Louisburg City Lake has a 1.5-mile (2.4 km) paved pathway around it for individuals to walk or jog. Additionally, Louisburg has the Louisburg Aquatic Center for swimming, a nine-hole public golf course, a city park, and the Lewis-Young Park, which has softball, baseball, and soccer fields that are used day and night.

Also located at Lewis-Young Park is the Powell Observatory, which was built in 1984 by members of the Astronomical Society of Kansas City. The observatory's telescopes include one of the largest in the region, which is also one of the few in the nation of its size that is made available for public viewing. The observatory regularly schedules viewings available to the public, and provides shows that are intended to educate individuals about astronomy. Private viewings can also be scheduled.

Near Louisburg is Rutlader Outpost, which has an RV park for those who camp.

Louisburg is well known for the Louisburg Cider Mill & Country Store which was constructed of wood saved from an old barn on 26945 Metcalf. The Louisburg Cider Mill holds several special events throughout the year, including Ciderfest in the fall.

Another unique attraction near Louisburg is Cedar Cove Feline Conservatory & Sanctuary. The big cats such as Siberian tigers, who reside in this conservatory, aid in teaching people about the wild. In addition, the conservatory allows people to learn how to aid these cats and their relatives who still live afar in the wild.

== Government ==
The Louisburg government consists of a mayor and five council members. The council meets the first and third Mondays of each month at 6:30PM.

== Education ==
The community is served by Louisburg USD 416 public school district.

Its schools are:

- Louisburg High School (grades 9–12)
- Louisburg Middle School (grades 6–8)
- Broadmoor Elementary (grades 3–5)
- Rockville Elementary (grades Pre K–2)
