= Wagstaffe =

Wagstaffe is a surname. Notable people with the surname include:

- Dave Wagstaffe, (1943–2013), English footballer
- Sir Joseph Wagstaffe, (1611?–1666/7), Royalist officer during the English Civil War
- Michael Wagstaffe, (born 1945), English cricketer

== See also ==
- Wagstaffe, New South Wales, Australia
- Wagstaff (disambiguation)
