= Hillsdale Lake =

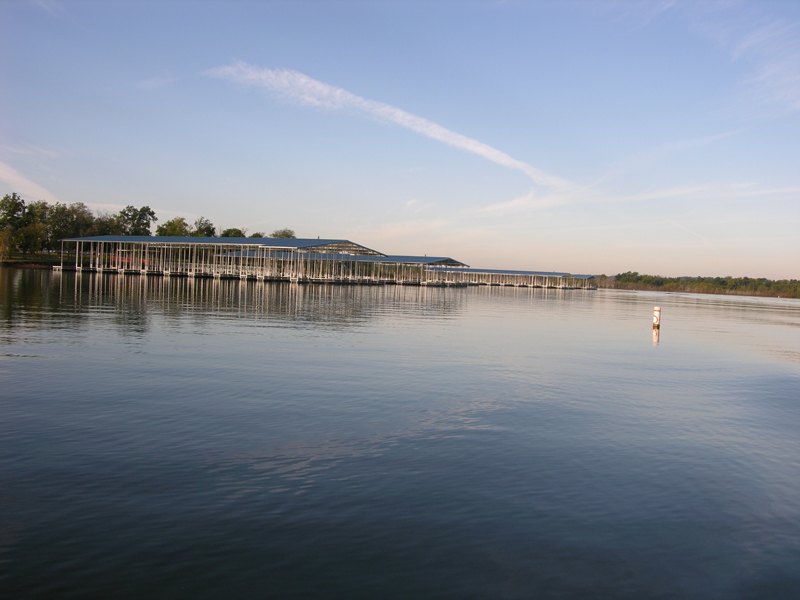
- Hillsdale Lake Marina

- Location within Kansas Location within the United States

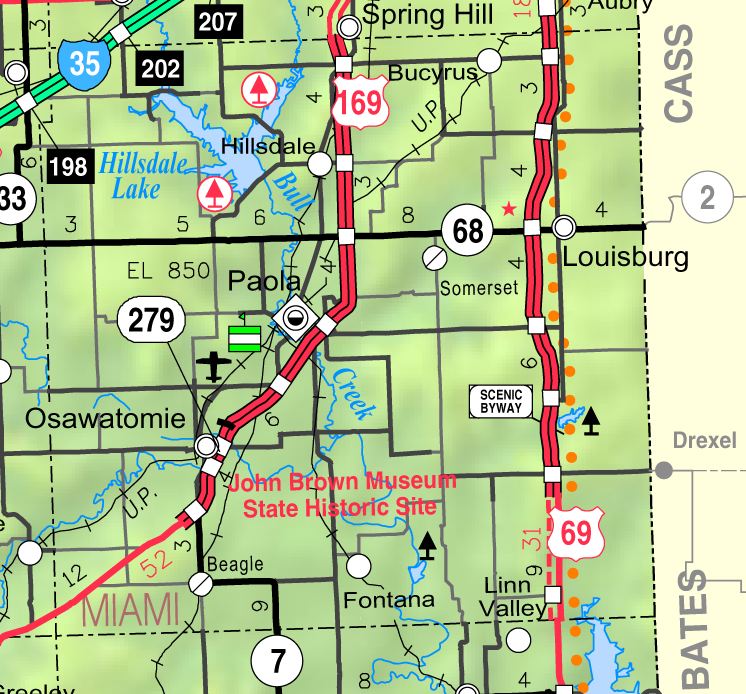
- KDOT map of Miami County (legend)
- Location: Miami County, Kansas
- Coordinates: 38°39′24″N 94°54′34″W
- Type: Reservoir
- Primary inflows: Big Bull Creek
- Primary outflows: Big Bull Creek → Marais des Cygnes River → Osage River
- Basin countries: United States
- Managing agency: U.S. Army Corps of Engineers
- Surface area: 4,580 acres (1,850 ha)
- Max. depth: 57 ft (17 m)
- Surface elevation: 917 ft (280 m)
- Settlements: Hillsdale, Paola, Spring Hill, Edgerton

Hillsdale Lake is a reservoir located in the northwestern part of Miami County, in northeast Kansas and the central United States; it is approximately 30 mi (48 km) from Kansas City. The surface area of the lake is approximately 4,580 acres (18.5 km^{2}), and the lake has a maximum depth of approximately 57 ft (17 m).

Hillsdale Dam, impounding the Big Bull Creek to create the V-shaped reservoir, was completed in 1982 as a flood control project of the United States Army Corps of Engineers. Fix link* The reservoir has a normal storage capacity of 76,000 acre-feet. No hydroelectric power is generated by the earthen dam. Recreational facilities include Hillsdale State Park, opened in 1994.

== See also ==
- List of Kansas state parks
- List of lakes, reservoirs, and dams in Kansas
- List of rivers of Kansas
