= Beagle, Kansas =

- Unincorporated community
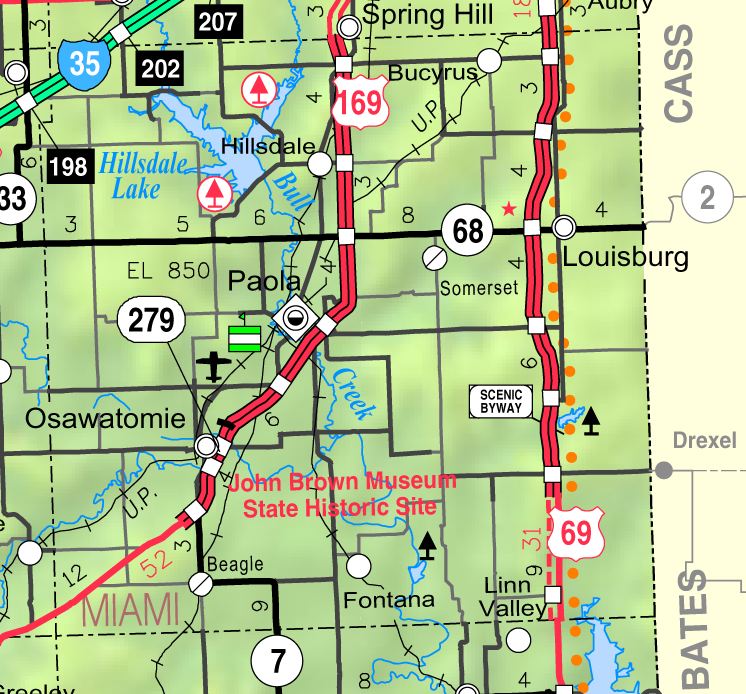
- KDOT map of Miami County (legend)

- Location within Kansas Location within the United States
- Coordinates: 38°25′5″N 94°57′18″W
- Country: United States
- State: Kansas
- County: Miami
- Elevation: 945 ft (288 m)
- Time zone: UTC-6 (CST)
  - Summer (DST): UTC-5 (CDT)
- Area code: 913
- FIPS code: 20-04825
- GNIS ID: 477619

Beagle is an unincorporated community in Miami County, Kansas, United States. It is located 5 miles (8.0 km) south of Osawatomie at W 391st St and Plum Creek Rd.
