= Cedar Cove Feline Conservatory & Sanctuary =

- Interactive map of Cedar Cove Feline Conservatory & Sanctuary
- 38.6191282°N 94.6284587°W
- Location: Louisburg, Kansas, United States
- Website: www.cedarcoveconservationcenter.org

Cedar Cove Feline Conservatory & Sanctuary is a small sanctuary located in Louisburg, Kansas, United States. It houses several felines, such as Bengal tigers, lions, servals, a mountain lion, Eurasian Lynx, Geoffroy's cats, an Asian Leopard Cat, and bobcats, as well as a Red fox and an Arctic fox.
