= Song of the Flame =

Operetta

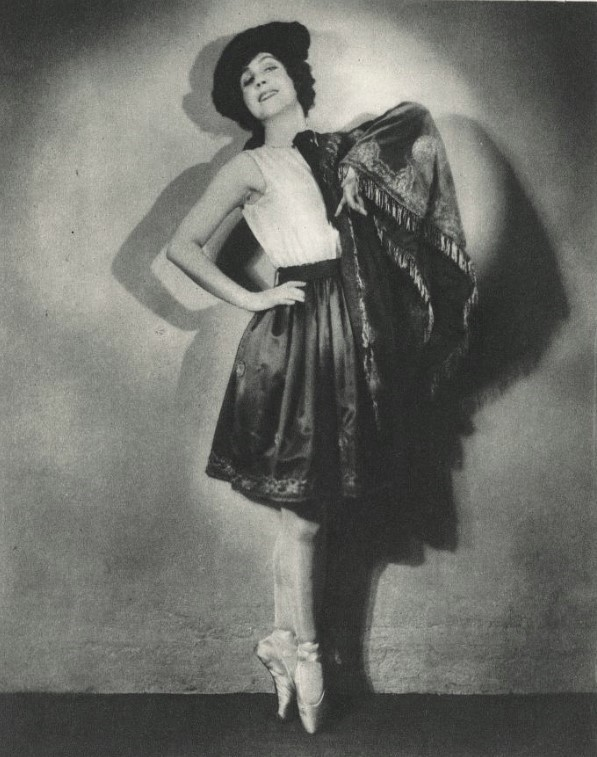
Ula Sharon during a May 1926 play of the operetta, at the 44th Street Theatre

Song of the Flame is an operetta with music by Herbert Stothart and George Gershwin, and a musical book and lyrics co-written by

Oscar Hammerstein II and Otto A. Harbach. Organized into a prologue, two acts, and an epilogue, the operetta is set in Moscow, Russia and Paris, France in the Spring of 1917.

Song of the Flame premiered on Broadway at the 44th Street Theatre on December 30, 1925. It ran for a total of 219 performances; closing on July 10, 1926 after 219 performances. Directed by Frank Reicher and choreographed by Jack Haskell, the production used sets created by the Australian designer Joseph Urban and costumes designed by Mark Mooring. The cast included Phoebe Brune as Natasha, Greek Evans as Konstantin, Tessa Kosta as Aniuta ("The Flame"), Guy Robertson as Prince Volodya, and the 52-member Russian Art Choir. The performance of the songs "Song of the Flame" and "Cossack Love Song" by Tessa Kosta and the Russian Art Choir were recorded onto Columbia records in 1926. The Russian Art Choir was directed by Alexander U. Fine
