= Jingo, Kansas =

- Unincorporated community
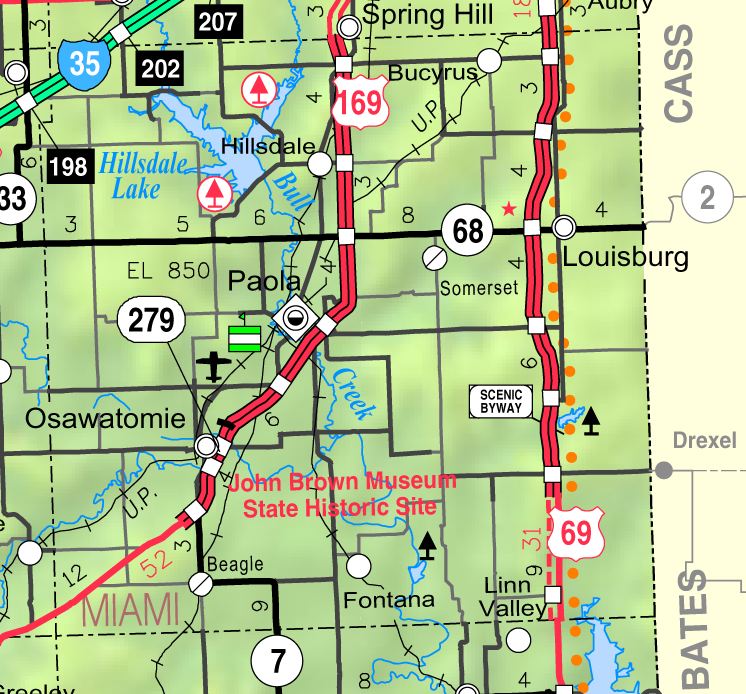
- KDOT map of Miami County (legend)

- Location within Kansas Location within the United States
- Coordinates: 38°24′14″N 94°41′46″W
- Country: United States
- State: Kansas
- County: Miami
- Elevation: 994 ft (303 m)
- Time zone: UTC-6 (CST)
  - Summer (DST): UTC-5 (CDT)
- Area code: 913
- FIPS code: 20-35525
- GNIS ID: 477639

Jingo is an unincorporated community in Miami County, Kansas, United States. It is part of the Kansas City metropolitan area.

== History ==
A post office was opened in Jingo in 1885, and remained in operation until it was discontinued in 1902.
