= Jingo, West Virginia =

Jingo
- Unincorporated community
- Location within the state of West Virginia Jingo (the United States)
- Coordinates: 38°43′27″N 81°28′42″W
- Country: United States
- State: West Virginia
- County: Roane
- Time zone: UTC-5 (Eastern (EST))
  - Summer (DST): UTC-4 (EDT)
- FIPS code: 1740916

Jingo was an unincorporated community located in Roane County, West Virginia, United States. The Jingo Post Office no longer exists.
