= Wagstaff, Kansas =

- Unincorporated community
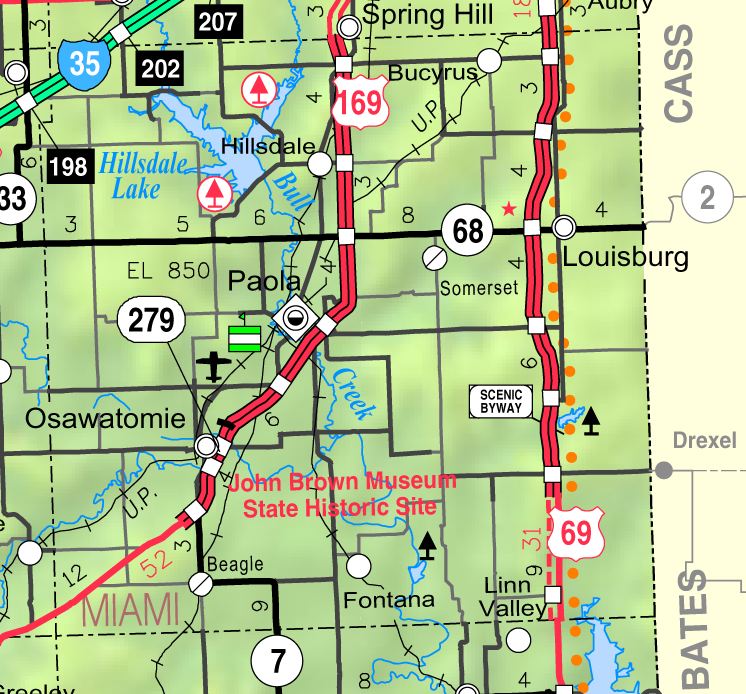
- KDOT map of Miami County (legend)

- Location within Kansas Location within the United States
- Coordinates: 38°39′54″N 94°47′47″W
- Country: United States
- State: Kansas
- County: Miami
- Elevation: 1,063 ft (324 m)
- Time zone: UTC-6 (CST)
  - Summer (DST): UTC-5 (CDT)
- Area code: 913
- FIPS code: 20-74375
- GNIS ID: 479413

Wagstaff is an unincorporated community in Miami County, Kansas, United States. It is part of the Kansas City metropolitan area.

== History ==
A post office was opened in Wagstaff in 1888, and remained in operation until it was discontinued in 1933.

In 2022 two tornadoes appeared near Wagstaff.
