= Paola USD 368 =

Public school district in Paola, Kansas

Address
- 1115 E 303rd St. Paola, Kansas, 66071; United States
- Coordinates: 38.57568°N 94.86157°W

District information
- Type: Public
- Grades: PreK to 12
- Schools: 5

Other information
- Website: usd368.org

Paola USD 368 is a public unified school district headquartered in Paola, Kansas, United States. The district includes the communities of Paola, Hillsdale, Somerset, and nearby rural areas.

== Schools ==
The school district operates the following schools:

- Paola High School (9-12)
- Paola Middle School (6-8)
- Sunflower Elementary School (3-5)
- Cottonwood Elementary School (PreK-2)
- Hillsdale Learning Center - previously was Hillsdale Elementary School

== See also ==
- Kansas State Department of Education
- Kansas State High School Activities Association
- List of high schools in Kansas
- List of unified school districts in Kansas
