= Hillsdale State Park =

State park in Kansas, United States

- Location within Kansas Location within the United States
- Interactive map of Hillsdale State Park
- Location: Miami County, Kansas, United States
- Coordinates: 38°40′05″N 94°55′04″W
- Established: 1988
- Administrator: Kansas Department of Wildlife and Parks
- Visitors: 606,529 (in 2022)
- Website: Official website
- Kansas State Parks

Hillsdale State Park is a state park in Paola, Kansas, United States, located on the shore of Hillsdale Lake which was completed in 1982. The park was established in 1988. It features fishing, camping, wildlife viewing, and hiking trails.

== See also ==
- List of lakes, reservoirs, and dams in Kansas
- List of rivers of Kansas
