= Jingo Tobimatsu =

Japanese hospital administrator

- Born: October 16, 1883; Ōita Prefecture
- Died: April 17, 1945 (aged 61)
- Occupations: Chief administrator of a leper hospital Kaishun Byoin, Kumamoto, Japan, under Hannah Riddell and Ada Hannah Wright
- Known for: Helped Hannah Riddell with administration and English ability

Jingo Tobimatsu (October 16, 1883 – April 17, 1945) was the chief administrator (1915–1941) of the Kaishun Hospital, a Hansen's disease hospital in Kumamoto, under Hannah Riddell and Ada Hannah Wright.

== History ==
He was born in Ōita Prefecture on October 16, 1883, and grew up in Kyoto Prefecture. He worked at Kobe customs house and acquired working English. In 1915, he was interested in Hannah Riddell and met her and became the chief administrator of the Kaishun Hospital under Hannah Riddell at Kumamoto with his wife and 3 children. Tobimatsu was always with Hannah Riddell with office works, administration of the hospital, negotiations with government offices and other organizations, fund-raising for the hospital, paying back the debt and accumulation of money. He accompanied Hannah Riddell when she went to Karuizawa for fund-raising every summer. In 1930, he was given a decorated box and money by Empress Teimei. In September 1940, he was arrested by Tokubetsu Kōtō Keisatsu and his health worsened. He was discharged 3 months later, but he fell ill and died on April 17, 1945. The arrest was on the suspicion of illegal use of money, since all of her 5 children received higher education, but this was because of the anti-English sentiment before the Pacific war.

== His Book ==
- Tobimatsu Jingo, Hannah Riddell, 1934. Some of the contents were under criticism because of the peculiar characters of Hannah Riddell, first by Julia Boyd.
