= Paola, Kansas =

- City and County seat
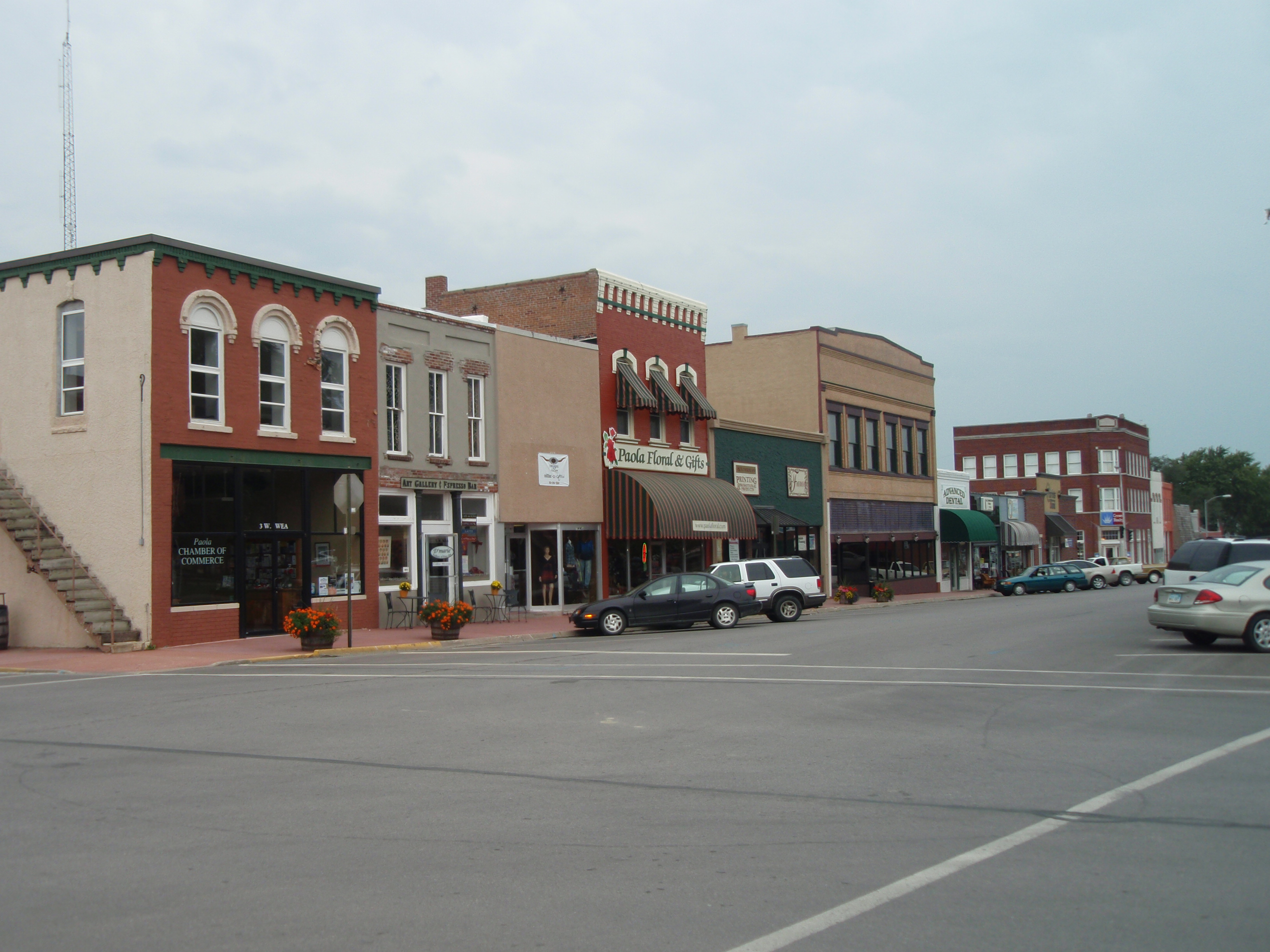
- Downtown Paola (2009)

- Location within Miami County and Kansas

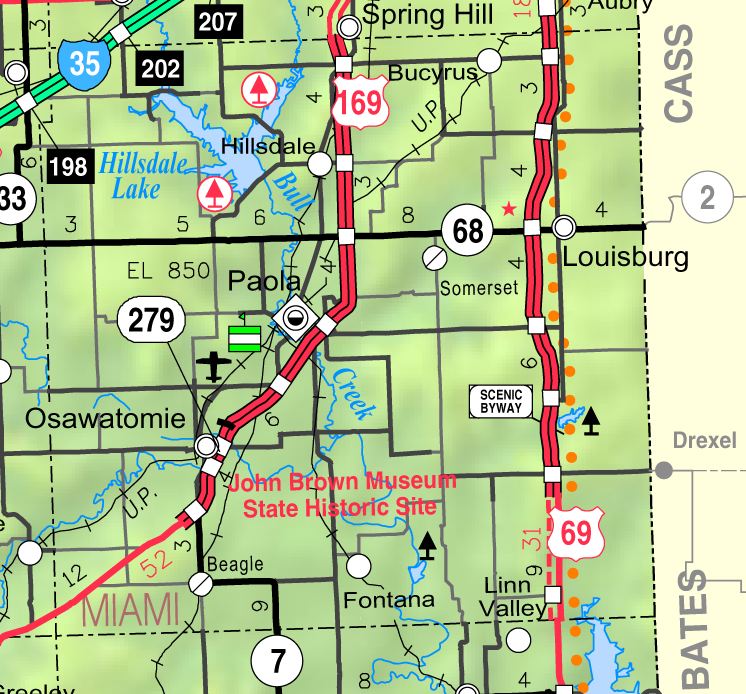
- KDOT map of Miami County (legend)
- Coordinates: 38°34′45″N 94°51′42″W
- Country: United States
- State: Kansas
- County: Miami
- Incorporated: 1855

Government
  - Mayor: James Michael

Area
  - Total: 5.53 sq mi (14.33 km^{2})
  - Land: 5.11 sq mi (13.24 km^{2})
  - Water: 0.42 sq mi (1.09 km^{2})
- Elevation: 906 ft (276 m)

Population (2020)
  - Total: 5,768
  - Estimate (2021): 5,786
  - Density: 1,128/sq mi (435.6/km^{2})
- Time zone: UTC-6 (CST)
  - Summer (DST): UTC-5 (CDT)
- ZIP Code: 66071
- Area code: 913
- FIPS code: 20-54250
- GNIS ID: 485640
- Website: cityofpaola.com

Paola /peɪˈoʊlə/ is a city in and the county seat of Miami County, Kansas, United States. As of the 2020 census, the population of the city was 5,768.

== History ==
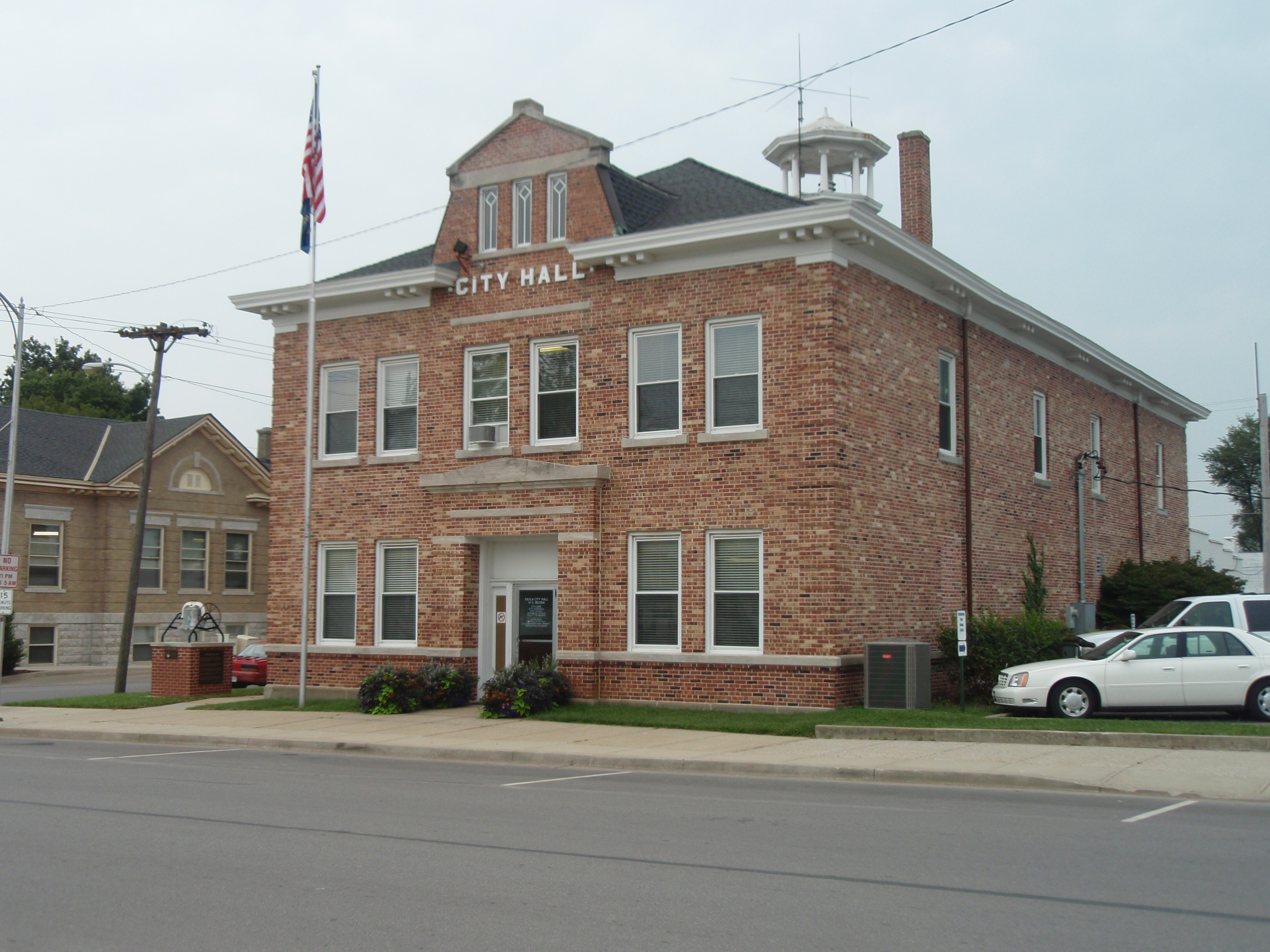
Paola City Hall

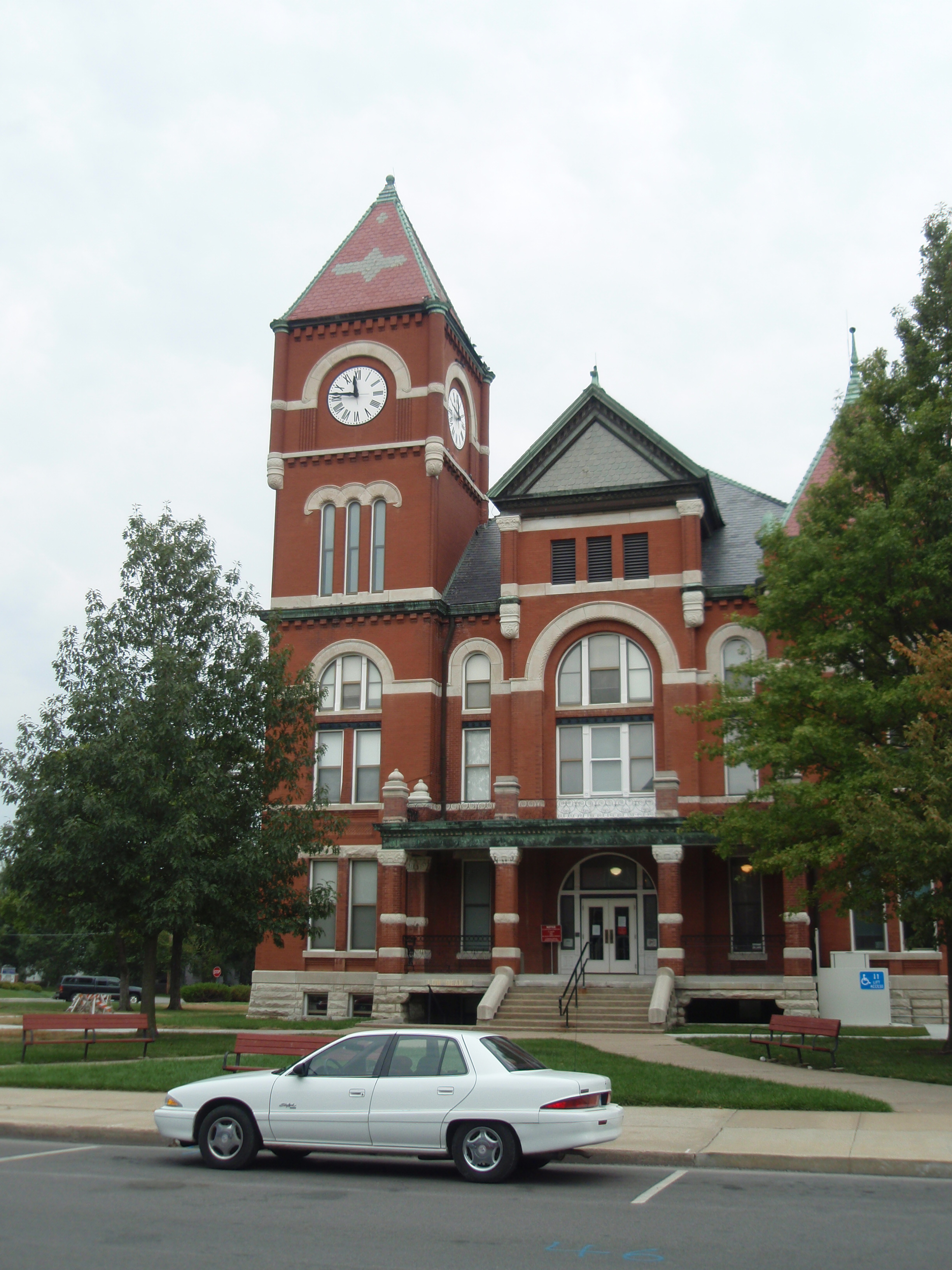
Miami County Courthouse

Native Americans, then Spanish explorers such as Francisco Vásquez de Coronado in 1541, and French missionary explorers in 1673 lived and traveled throughout the area of what is now Paola. Despite these early European incursions at the start of the 19th century, the area was largely controlled by the Osage people.

Settlement of the area primarily occurred, however, when Kaskaskia, Peoria, Wea, and Piankeshaw tribes were forced to move to the area between 1827 and 1832. These formed the Confederated Allied Tribe, which was led by Baptiste Peoria, who was of both French and Indian ethnicity. They called their settlement Peoria Village.

By the 1840s, Euro-American settlers were moving into the area, and several missionaries lived in and near "Peoria Village". One of those missionaries was an Italian priest who moved to the area in 1852. The priest, Father Paul D. Ponziglione, was credited with renaming Peoria Village to Paola, after a small town on the coast of Calabria, Italy. The Peoria Indians of the area continued to call it Paola, because they had great respect for Father Ponziglione.

By 1854 there was a large number of settlers who moved to the settlement, and a town plat was laid out by 1855. In 1855, the First Territorial Legislature passed an act that incorporated the Paola Town Company. The Paola Town Company and specifically its member Baptiste Peoria with his wife Mary Ann Isaacs are credited as being influential in the founding and development of Paola through the mid-1860s.

During the Civil War a military post was established on the west side of Bull Creek, just west of Paola. At times troops were inside Paola itself. Paola was barely spared an attack on August 21, 1863, by Confederate guerrilla William C. Quantrill during Quantrill's retreat after raiding Lawrence. Paola was 10 miles (16 km) west of the retreat of Confederate Maj. Gen. Sterling Price's force on October 24, 1864, while he was retreating toward Indian Territory. Paola's post was deactivated in August or September 1865.

Following Kansas' admission to the Union in 1861, Civil War pressure to move the Native American tribes increased, and they were exiled to Oklahoma by 1868. Some individuals stayed and became citizens of the United States, however, their leader Baptiste Peoria left Paola with the tribe. From the late 1860s and through the 1870s, Paola grew and progressed, building its first school, jail, and bank.

The railroad came to serve Paola in 1870, which also aided its progress through this time. Following the discovery of natural gas in 1882, Paola became the first town west of the Mississippi River to use it commercially and have the town illuminated using natural gas lanterns. In 1898 the Miami County Courthouse was built, designed by architect George Washburn. Several homes and buildings were designed by Washburn, including the Paola Park Square gazebo and the Paola Free Library. Martha Smith had the Paola Library building constructed in honor of her husband John, a wine maker. It was completed in 1906 and the Paola Park Square's Victorian-style gazebo is from 1913. The library, courthouse, gazebo, and several homes are among those still in use today.

In 1912, James Patterson moved to Paola to establish his winter quarters for his travelling circus, the Patterson Circus. The circus continued until 1927. A wall mural based on a 1924 circus pamphlet, is at 106 W. Peoria. The Patterson's home still stands in Paola in the 600 block of north Mulberry, as the only remaining structure from the circus winter headquarters.

=== Paola Park Square ===
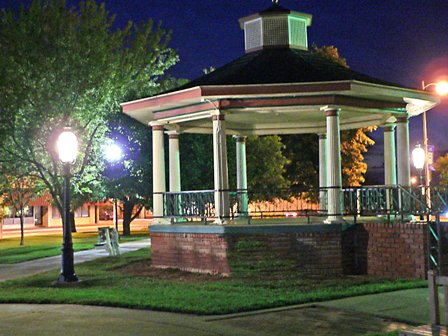
Paola Park Square's gazebo

Paola's town began with the Indian tribes who once lived in the area and used it as their primary gathering place. Prior to their exile to Oklahoma, Indian leader Baptiste Peoria gave this area to the Paola Town Company (of which he was a member) as a treaty of peace. The Paola Town Company later gave the square to the City of Paola, with the provision that no building be built on it. In 1867, the original gazebo was put on the square, and was a bandstand. In the 1800s the square was used as a track for racing horses in addition to serving as a central point for parades, celebrations, and other community events. In 1913, a new Victorian-style gazebo was built, designed by George Washburn. Paola Park Square is used for community events each year. The 1913 gazebo is still used, and near the gazebo is a bust of Paola founders Baptiste Peoria and his wife, Mary Ann Isaacs Dagenet. It is the only known monument in the United States featuring a Native American and his wife. A fountain in the center of the square was also added.

== Geography ==
According to the United States Census Bureau, the city has a total area of 5.32 square miles (13.78 km^{2}), of which 4.90 square miles (12.69 km^{2}) is land and 0.42 square miles (1.09 km^{2}) is water.

=== Climate ===
The climate in this area is characterized by hot, humid summers and generally mild to cool dry winters. According to the Köppen Climate Classification system, Paola has a humid subtropical climate, abbreviated "Cfa" on climate maps.

Climate data for Paola, Kansas, 1991–2020 normals, extremes 1895–2009
Month	Jan	Feb	Mar	Apr	May	Jun	Jul	Aug	Sep	Oct	Nov	Dec	Year
Record high °F (°C)	74 (23)	82 (28)	94 (34)	92 (33)	96 (36)	106 (41)	111 (44)	109 (43)	106 (41)	96 (36)	87 (31)	72 (22)	111 (44)
Mean daily maximum °F (°C)	39.7 (4.3)	45.3 (7.4)	55.6 (13.1)	65.8 (18.8)	75.3 (24.1)	83.9 (28.8)	88.6 (31.4)	87.1 (30.6)	79.7 (26.5)	68.6 (20.3)	54.7 (12.6)	42.7 (5.9)	65.6 (18.7)
Daily mean °F (°C)	29.3 (−1.5)	34.3 (1.3)	44.2 (6.8)	54.6 (12.6)	65.3 (18.5)	74.4 (23.6)	78.7 (25.9)	76.7 (24.8)	68.6 (20.3)	56.7 (13.7)	44.1 (6.7)	32.9 (0.5)	55.0 (12.8)
Mean daily minimum °F (°C)	19.0 (−7.2)	23.2 (−4.9)	32.9 (0.5)	43.4 (6.3)	55.3 (12.9)	64.8 (18.2)	68.9 (20.5)	66.2 (19.0)	57.5 (14.2)	44.8 (7.1)	33.6 (0.9)	23.1 (−4.9)	44.4 (6.9)
Record low °F (°C)	−16 (−27)	−22 (−30)	−7 (−22)	14 (−10)	24 (−4)	42 (6)	47 (8)	45 (7)	28 (−2)	19 (−7)	3 (−16)	−21 (−29)	−22 (−30)
Average precipitation inches (mm)	1.24 (31)	1.68 (43)	2.69 (68)	3.84 (98)	6.14 (156)	5.22 (133)	4.02 (102)	4.33 (110)	4.62 (117)	3.42 (87)	2.37 (60)	1.79 (45)	41.36 (1,050)
Average snowfall inches (cm)	3.1 (7.9)	3.5 (8.9)	0.8 (2.0)	0.1 (0.25)	0.0 (0.0)	0.0 (0.0)	0.0 (0.0)	0.0 (0.0)	0.0 (0.0)	0.1 (0.25)	0.6 (1.5)	3.2 (8.1)	11.4 (28.9)
Average precipitation days (≥ 0.01 in)	6.2	5.3	7.7	9.8	11.4	9.3	9.1	7.2	8.1	8.7	6.6	6.0	95.4
Average snowy days (≥ 0.1 in)	2.2	1.7	0.6	0.1	0.0	0.0	0.0	0.0	0.0	0.0	0.4	1.8	6.8
Source 1: NOAA (snow/snow days 1981–2010)
Source 2: National Weather Service

== Demographics ==
Historical population
Census	Pop.	Note	%±
1870	1,811		—
1880	2,312		27.7%
1890	2,943		27.3%
1900	3,144		6.8%
1910	3,207		2.0%
1920	3,238		1.0%
1930	3,702		14.3%
1940	3,511		−5.2%
1950	3,972		13.1%
1960	4,784		20.4%
1970	4,622		−3.4%
1980	4,557		−1.4%
1990	4,698		3.1%
2000	5,011		6.7%
2010	5,602		11.8%
2020	5,768		3.0%
2023 (est.)	5,780		0.2%
U.S. Decennial Census; 2010-2020

Paola is part of the Kansas City metropolitan area.

=== 2020 census ===
As of the 2020 census, Paola had a population of 5,768. The median age was 40.5 years. 24.0% of residents were under the age of 18 and 19.3% of residents were 65 years of age or older. For every 100 females there were 91.5 males, and for every 100 females age 18 and over there were 89.4 males age 18 and over.

96.2% of residents lived in urban areas, while 3.8% lived in rural areas.

There were 2,396 households and 1,440 families in Paola. Of the households, 29.3% had children under the age of 18 living in them. Of all households, 42.8% were married-couple households, 18.6% were households with a male householder and no spouse or partner present, and 32.1% were households with a female householder and no spouse or partner present. About 34.6% of all households were made up of individuals and 16.8% had someone living alone who was 65 years of age or older.

There were 2,605 housing units, of which 8.0% were vacant. The homeowner vacancy rate was 2.1% and the rental vacancy rate was 8.7%. The population density was 1,132.8 per square mile (437.4/km^{2}), and housing density was 511.6 per square mile (197.5/km^{2}).

Racial composition as of the 2020 census
Race	Number	Percent
White	5,086	88.2%
Black or African American	133	2.3%
American Indian and Alaska Native	27	0.5%
Asian	22	0.4%
Native Hawaiian and Other Pacific Islander	5	0.1%
Some other race	61	1.1%
Two or more races	434	7.5%
Hispanic or Latino (of any race)	214	3.7%

=== Households and housing ===
The average household size was 2.2 and the average family size was 3.0.

=== Education ===
The percent of those with a bachelor's degree or higher was estimated to be 20.6% of the population.

=== Income and poverty ===
The 2016–2020 5-year American Community Survey estimates show that the median household income was $52,417 (with a margin of error of +/- $15,986) and the median family income was $79,716 (+/- $16,079). Males had a median income of $50,753 (+/- $14,543) versus $31,607 (+/- $2,933) for females. The median income for those above 16 years old was $36,509 (+/- $3,766). Approximately, 3.8% of families and 6.9% of the population were below the poverty line, including 7.4% of those under the age of 18 and 10.0% of those ages 65 or over.

=== 2010 census ===
As of the census of 2010, there were 5,602 people, 2,173 households, and 1,407 families residing in the city. The population density was 1,143.3 inhabitants per square mile (441.4/km^{2}). There were 2,344 housing units at an average density of 478.4 per square mile (184.7/km^{2}). The racial makeup of the city was 93.5% White, 2.4% African American, 0.7% Native American, 0.3% Asian, 0.6% from other races, and 2.5% from two or more races. Hispanic or Latino of any race were 3.0% of the population.

There were 2,173 households, of which 35.8% had children under the age of 18 living with them, 47.1% were married couples living together, 13.4% had a female householder with no husband present, 4.2% had a male householder with no wife present, and 35.3% were non-families. 30.6% of all households were made up of individuals, and 13.5% had someone living alone who was 65 years of age or older. The average household size was 2.45 and the average family size was 3.07.

The median age in the city was 35.5 years. 28.4% of residents were under the age of 18; 8.1% were between the ages of 18 and 24; 25.5% were from 25 to 44; 23.2% were from 45 to 64; and 14.9% were 65 years of age or older. The gender makeup of the city was 46.6% male and 53.4% female.

== Arts and culture ==
Paola is the largest city in Miami County and is the county seat. Annually, Paola hosts the Miami County Fair in July, the Roots Festival in August, the Harvest Festival in October, and a Christmas tree lighting after Thanksgiving.

Water recreation and camping are available at Lake Miola, a contemporary Aquatic Center in Wallace Park, the Swan River Museum, and the Miami County Historical and Genealogical Society, and a variety of events held at the Paola Community Center.

== Education ==
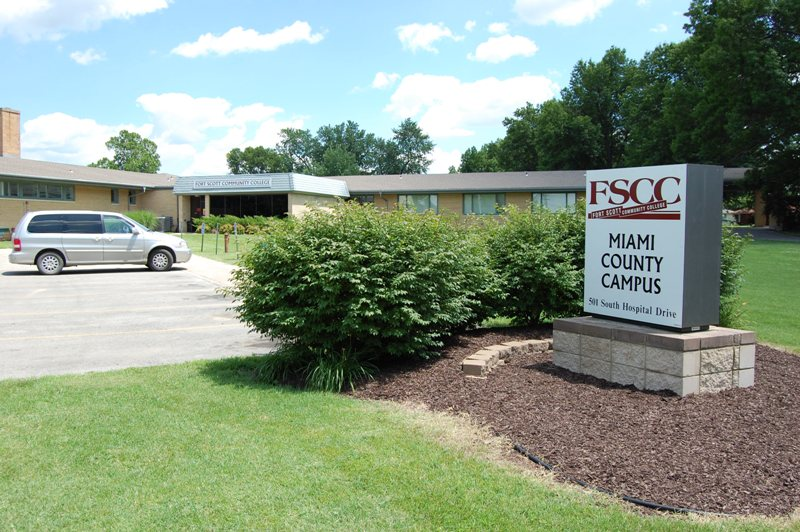
Fort Scott Community College campus in Paola (2008)

Public

The community is served by Paola USD 368 public school district:

- Paola High School (9-12)
- Paola Middle School (6-8)
- Sunflower Elementary (3-5)
- Cottonwood Elementary (PreK-2)
- Hillsdale Learning Center - previously was Hillsdale Elementary School

=== Private ===
- Holy Trinity Catholic School (K-8)

=== Colleges ===
- Fort Scott Community College is a community college with a satellite campus in Paola.

== Notable people ==
- Kevin Appier, MLB pitcher
- Olive Ann Beech (born Olive Ann Mellor), U.S. aviation pioneer and businesswoman
- Danny Carey, drummer for the band Tool
- John Conway, State Senator, New Mexico, United States Federal Judge
- Lynn Dickey, Kansas State and NFL quarterback
- Barney Graham, vaccine scientist
- Stephen Johnson, music video director
- Steve Pepoon, television writer
- John Tibbetts, film critic and historian

== See also ==
- Hillsdale Lake and Hillsdale State Park
