= Miami County, Kansas =

County in Kansas, United States

- County
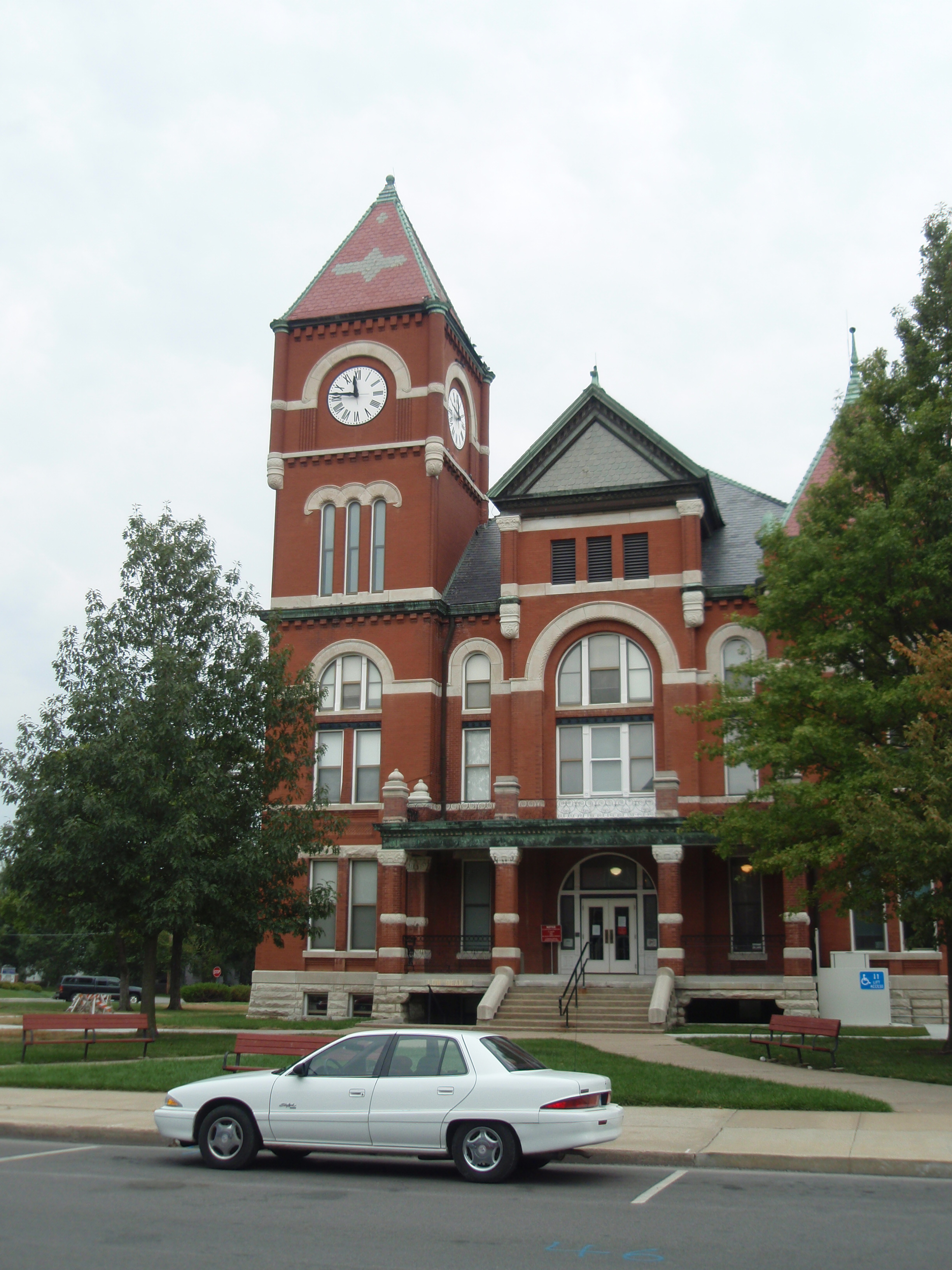
- Miami County Courthouse in Paola (2009)

- Location within the U.S. state of Kansas
- Coordinates: 38°35′00″N 94°51′00″W
- Country: United States
- State: Kansas
- Founded: August 25, 1855
- Named for: Miami tribe
- Seat: Paola
- Largest city: Spring Hill

Area
  - Total: 590 sq mi (1,500 km^{2})
  - Land: 576 sq mi (1,490 km^{2})
  - Water: 15 sq mi (39 km^{2}) 2.5%

Population (2020)
  - Total: 34,191
  - Estimate (2025): 36,240 ▲
  - Density: 59.4/sq mi (22.9/km^{2})
- Time zone: UTC−6 (Central)
  - Summer (DST): UTC−5 (CDT)
- Congressional district: 3rd
- Website: www.miamicountyks.gov

Miami County is a county located in east-central Kansas, United States. It is part of the Kansas City metropolitan area. Its county seat is Paola. As of the 2020 census, the county population was 34,191. The county was named for the Miami tribe.

== History ==
=== Native Americans ===
The first settlements of the area were by Native American Indian tribes, primarily in the 1820s through the 1840s. This was due to their removal from areas east (Ohio, Illinois and Indiana) and the designation of the area as part of the Indian Territory. The tribes included were the Miami and Shawnee, and the Pottawatomie, Piankeshaw, Kaskaskia, Wea and Peoria, which comprised the Confederated Tribes. The original Miami reservation consisted of approximately 500,000 acres (2,000 km^{2}). Early white settlers during that time were primarily serving as missionaries to the tribes. Over time, other settlers continued to arrive to build homes on the Miami reservation, and by 1854, the U.S. Government purchased all but 72,000 acres (290 km^{2}) from the Miami tribe.

Two notable members of the Confederated Tribes were Christmas Dagnette, and Baptiste Peoria. Dagnette was born in 1800, and was a nephew of a Wea chief, originally from Indiana. He had received some formal education, spoke several of the Native American languages, and additionally spoke English, French and Spanish. He had served as an interpreter to the U.S. Government by the age of sixteen. Having moved to the area that is now Miami County with the Wea tribe, he served as chief for several years before his death in 1848. Baptiste Peoria was also born around 1800, and while he didn't receive formal education like Dagnette, he learned the languages of the Shawnee, Delaware, Pottawatomie, and several more of the Confederated Tribes. In addition, he spoke English and French. Peoria was of both French and Native American Indian ethnicity, and like Dagnette, served as an interpreter and as a chief for some time. Baptiste Peoria became a respected member of the Paola Town Company, and was instrumental in the founding and development of the city of Paola in the early and mid-1860s. He moved (to what is now Oklahoma) with his tribe in 1868, when they were once again removed to a newly designated Indian territory, and died there in 1878. Some of the Native American Indians stayed in the area (Miami County), and became citizens of the United States.

=== Trail of Death ===
A notorious path known as the Trail of Death has been officially recognized by the states of Indiana, Illinois, Missouri and Kansas. Signs in all four states highlight the regional historic pathway. The 27-mile trail through the county follows local roads, starting in the north at the intersection of 215th Street and Metcalf Avenue (old U.S. Highway 69). It moves south along Metcalf Avenue to Kansas Highway 68, where it again turns west along K-68 to Old Kansas City Road, north of Paola. There it turns south on Old KC Road to Baptiste Drive in Paola. The trail makes a short turn back east on Baptiste Drive to North Pearl Street, where it turns south again to West Wea Street adjacent to Paola's historic Square. It turns west on Wea Street to South Silver Street, follows what is also known as Old Kansas City Road to 327th Street. By turning west on 327th, the trail enters its final path on one road that undergoes several names. The county road, 327th Street becomes 6th St, Osawatomie as it turns south and enters the city limits. As it exits the city limits, it becomes Plum Creek Road/ K-7 Highway. The southernmost monument for the Trail of Death is located at 363rd Street and Plum Creek Road.

A treaty signed in 1836 forced Indian tribes in the Eastern United States to move west of the Mississippi River, but Pottawatomie Chief Menominee, his tribe, and others refused to leave their land. In autumn 1838, the Pottawatomie were removed by force from their villages and underwent a treacherous two-month journey. On the trip, 42 of the 859 Native Americans died, most of them children and the elderly, from typhoid fever and the stress of the passage. They were buried along the route, which became known as the Trail of Death.

When they reached Kansas, some Pottawatomie lived for about a decade in Linn County at Sugar Creek Trading Post, which is now St. Philippine Duchesne Memorial Park. Other Pottawatomie tribes were relocated to various eastern parts of the state.

The trail, which marks the route the Pottawatomie took, begins in Rochester, Indiana and meanders through Illinois and Missouri to end in eastern Kansas. The route was documented by Jesse C. Douglas, who accompanied the group on the march.

The Trail of Death Commemorative Caravan of Pottawatomie Indians and historians has retraced the 660-mile trail every five years since 1988. Travelers on the trail today can view artifacts from the Pottawatomie Tribe along with other historical displays at the Miami County Historical Museum located in Paola, 12 E. Peoria St. Those displays include a diary of their trip, which hangs just outside the Early American History Room.

=== Pre-Civil War Period ===
When Kansas Territory was incorporated in 1854 due to the Kansas–Nebraska Act, the Missouri Compromise of 1820 was essentially repealed. Bordering the slave state of Missouri to its east, the county (Miami) and surrounding areas became a location for violence between abolitionists and the "border ruffians" of Missouri. These acts of violence and battles that took place primarily from 1854 to 1858, became known as border wars, and Kansas became known as Bleeding Kansas. Kansas Territory was not yet a state, and it was a battle on which forces would become dominant, slave or free. Many abolitionists came from other states to live in the area and ensure Kansas' entry as a state as a free, or anti-slavery one. The county's most notable abolitionist was John Brown, who moved to Osawatomie, making it the headquarters for him and his anti-slavery forces. As a result of this, Osawatomie, as well as the surrounding countryside and communities became the center for several battles and acts of violence during this period. Near Osawatomie are historic sites of John Brown, such as his famous Civil War lookout.

=== Etymology ===
The county was originally established in 1855 as Lykins County, after Dr. David Lykins. Lykins was a Baptist missionary to the Native American Indian tribes in the area, and had built a school for them in what is now rural Miami County. He also served as a member of the territorial council, and was pro-slavery. By January 1861, the anti-slavery forces had been established as dominant, and Kansas entered the union as a free state. As a result of Dr. Lykins' views on slavery, Lykins County's name was changed to Miami County on June 3, 1861. The new name was in honor of the predominant Native American tribe that settled the area, the Miami.

=== Natural gas ===
In 1882, a large deposit of natural gas was discovered in rural Miami County, 7 miles (11 km) east of Paola. By 1886 a pipeline was completed to the town's square, where it illuminated lamps there. By 1887, Paola had its street lamps lighted with lamps using natural gas. Other fields of natural gas were discovered throughout Miami County by 1887, and for a time, the area around Paola was considered to be a gas belt. In the summer of 1887, a Natural Gas Jubilee was held, which was a celebration for people to come and marvel at the use of natural gas.

== Geography ==
According to the U.S. Census Bureau, the county has a total area of 590 square miles (1,500 km^{2}), of which 576 square miles (1,490 km^{2}) is land and 15 square miles (39 km^{2}) (2.5%) is water.

=== Lakes ===
- Hillsdale Lake – The largest lake in Miami County, this lake is also diverse in what it offers. Among the activities at Hillsdale are camping, fishing, swimming, boating, hunting, and hiking. Horseback riding is also largely available, with 32 miles (51 km) of marked trails on the lake's east side. Model airplane flying also has its own special designated area.
- Louisburg Middle Creek Lake – It is located 7 miles south of Louisburg, Kansas on Metcalf road. It is a prime source of water for the city of Louisburg. In addition the lake offers superb fishing and camping. Fishing boats are allowed on the lake but swimming and water sports are prohibited. The lake is managed by the Kansas Department of Wildlife and Parks. Species stocked in the lake include Bluegill, Channel, Flathead, Large and Smallmouth Bass, Crappie, Saugeye, Walleye, White Bass and Sunfish. The Lake and camp sites are open to the public at no charge. Great place to get away.

Other lakes in Miami County, each with specific restrictions and activities to offer, include:

- Miola Lake
- Miami County State Lake
- Osawatomie Lake
- Paola Lake
- Hunters Lake
- Wagstaff Lake

=== Adjacent counties ===
- Johnson County (north)
- Cass County, Missouri (east)
- Bates County, Missouri (southeast)
- Linn County (south)
- Anderson County (southwest)
- Franklin County (west)
- Douglas County (northwest)

== Demographics ==
Historical population
Census	Pop.	Note	%±
1860	4,980		—
1870	11,725		135.4%
1880	17,802		51.8%
1890	19,614		10.2%
1900	21,641		10.3%
1910	20,030		−7.4%
1920	19,809		−1.1%
1930	21,243		7.2%
1940	19,489		−8.3%
1950	19,698		1.1%
1960	19,884		0.9%
1970	19,254		−3.2%
1980	21,618		12.3%
1990	23,466		8.5%
2000	28,351		20.8%
2010	32,787		15.6%
2020	34,191		4.3%
2025 (est.)	36,240	▲	6.0%
U.S. Decennial Census; 1790-1960 1900-1990; 1990-2000 2010-2020

Miami County is included in the Kansas City metropolitan area.

=== 2020 census ===
As of the 2020 census, the county had a population of 34,191. The median age was 41.1 years. 24.7% of residents were under the age of 18 and 17.6% of residents were 65 years of age or older. For every 100 females there were 99.0 males, and for every 100 females age 18 and over there were 97.3 males age 18 and over. 24.6% of residents lived in urban areas, while 75.4% lived in rural areas.

The racial makeup of the county was 90.4% White, 1.3% Black or African American, 0.5% American Indian and Alaska Native, 0.5% Asian, 0.0% Native Hawaiian and Pacific Islander, 0.9% from some other race, and 6.4% from two or more races. Hispanic or Latino residents of any race comprised 3.5% of the population.

There were 12,926 households in the county, of which 32.9% had children under the age of 18 living with them and 20.3% had a female householder with no spouse or partner present. About 23.0% of all households were made up of individuals and 10.9% had someone living alone who was 65 years of age or older.

There were 13,865 housing units, of which 6.8% were vacant. Among occupied housing units, 77.1% were owner-occupied and 22.9% were renter-occupied. The homeowner vacancy rate was 1.5% and the rental vacancy rate was 7.9%.

=== 2000 census ===
As of the 2000 census, there were 28,351 people, 10,365 households, and 7,794 families residing in the county. The population density was 49 people per square mile (19 people/km^{2}). There were 10,984 housing units at an average density of 19 per square mile (7.3/km^{2}). The racial makeup of the county was 95.96% White, 1.54% Black or African American, 0.52% Native American, 0.17% Asian, 0.01% Pacific Islander, 0.44% from other races, and 1.36% from two or more races. Hispanic or Latino of any race were 1.59% of the population.

There were 10,365 households, out of which 37.00% had children under the age of 18 living with them, 63.50% were married couples living together, 8.00% had a female householder with no husband present, and 24.80% were non-families. 21.00% of all households were made up of individuals, and 8.80% had someone living alone who was 65 years of age or older. The average household size was 2.66 and the average family size was 3.09.

In the county, the population was spread out, with 27.90% under the age of 18, 7.30% from 18 to 24, 29.70% from 25 to 44, 23.10% from 45 to 64, and 11.90% who were 65 years of age or older. The median age was 37 years. For every 100 females there were 97.80 males. For every 100 females age 18 and over, there were 96.00 males.

The median income for a household in the county was $46,665, and the median income for a family was $55,830. Males had a median income of $37,441 versus $27,271 for females. The per capita income for the county was $21,408. About 3.60% of families and 5.50% of the population were below the poverty line, including 5.40% of those under age 18 and 8.40% of those age 65 or over.

== Landmarks ==
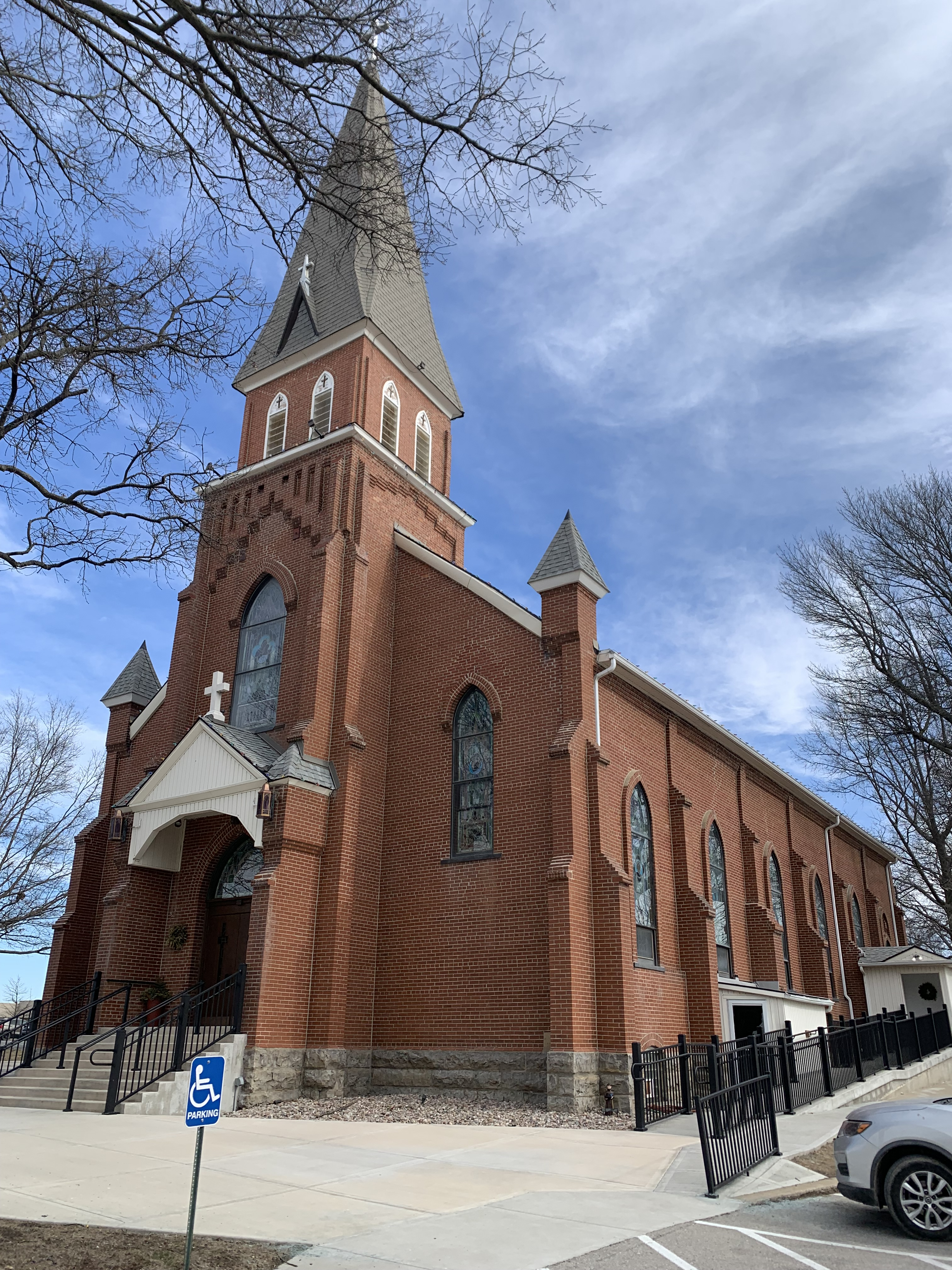
Holy Rosary Church at Wea (2026)

Miami County communities are host to many landmarks and buildings with historical significance. From historical bridges and architecture such as the Creamery Bridge, as well as John Brown & Civil War history in and near Osawatomie, to the hall of fame musical landmark and cider mill near Louisburg, to a library constructed in honor of a wine maker in Paola. The Poor Farm Cemetery, historically significant because many of those interred at the site once worked the county's Poor Farm, is just one of several historical cemeteries.

== Community ==
The location of Miami County, a short drive south of Kansas City, allows it to offer residents and visitors aspects of both city and rural lifestyles. Miami County and its cities, Paola, Louisburg, Spring Hill, Osawatomie, and Fontana offer a variety of activities and hobbies. Among them are golf, hiking, camping, fishing, hunting, horseback riding, water sports, astronomy and a variety of community festivals and events that take place throughout the year. There are also historical places and museums to study its history. During the summer, each community offers a farmer's market with booths offering locally grown food and goods.

=== Miami County Farm Tour ===
In the spring of each year, various Miami County farms and farm businesses participate in the Miami County Farm Tour. The public is invited to come to each farm with their families as part of a free self-guided driving tour. The goal is to experience and learn about the operations, produce and/or animals at each farm stop. Visitors and residents of Miami County have made the farm tour an annual event.

=== Agriculture ===
According to the USDA's 2007 Census of Agriculture, Miami County has 1,538 farms and the average size of the farm is 200 acres (81 ha). Forage, including hay, grass silage, etc... tops the crop list with over 54,000 acres (22,000 ha). More than 40,000 acres (16,000 ha) within the county are used to grow soybeans. Corn is planted to over 20,500 acres (8,300 ha). The top livestock items in number are Cattle and calves, totaling over 43,000. Horses and layers (chickens) are next with over 3,400 and 2,100 respectively. (

The 1990 World Supreme Champion dairy cow once resided in Miami County. This holstein cow, named Enns Banner Olivia, came to Miami County from Marion County, Kansas when she was three years old to the farm named Keene, Pretz Holsteins.

Miami County has the Fontana Co-Op for farmers to take harvested crop for storage until ready for market. There are two locations for them to make use of.

== Government ==
=== Presidential elections ===
Presidential election results

United States presidential election results for Miami County, Kansas
Year	Republican		Democratic		Third party(ies)	
Year	No.	%	No.	%	No.	%
1888	2,170	51.31%	1,600	37.83%	459	10.85%
1892	2,243	49.10%	0	0.00%	2,325	50.90%
1896	2,541	47.10%	2,812	52.12%	42	0.78%
1900	2,663	52.27%	2,401	47.12%	31	0.61%
1904	2,899	63.46%	1,425	31.20%	244	5.34%
1908	2,475	51.03%	2,256	46.52%	119	2.45%
1912	1,033	23.71%	1,919	44.05%	1,404	32.23%
1916	3,086	41.74%	4,047	54.74%	260	3.52%
1920	4,060	60.92%	2,450	36.76%	154	2.31%
1924	4,788	61.76%	1,994	25.72%	971	12.52%
1928	5,931	72.71%	2,148	26.33%	78	0.96%
1932	3,667	43.04%	4,739	55.62%	114	1.34%
1936	4,676	50.33%	4,601	49.52%	14	0.15%
1940	5,178	56.77%	3,900	42.76%	43	0.47%
1944	4,326	57.28%	3,217	42.60%	9	0.12%
1948	3,650	49.40%	3,660	49.54%	78	1.06%
1952	5,623	62.33%	3,374	37.40%	25	0.28%
1956	5,031	59.30%	3,428	40.41%	25	0.29%
1960	4,857	57.85%	3,505	41.75%	34	0.40%
1964	2,907	38.40%	4,620	61.03%	43	0.57%
1968	3,614	48.93%	2,739	37.08%	1,033	13.99%
1972	5,234	69.04%	2,140	28.23%	207	2.73%
1976	3,999	48.67%	4,000	48.69%	217	2.64%
1980	4,740	57.10%	3,071	37.00%	490	5.90%
1984	5,877	65.04%	3,076	34.04%	83	0.92%
1988	4,807	51.65%	4,427	47.57%	72	0.77%
1992	3,528	31.80%	3,835	34.56%	3,733	33.64%
1996	5,256	47.98%	4,237	38.68%	1,462	13.35%
2000	6,611	56.96%	4,554	39.23%	442	3.81%
2004	9,013	64.31%	4,838	34.52%	165	1.18%
2008	9,382	61.01%	5,742	37.34%	253	1.65%
2012	9,858	66.36%	4,712	31.72%	286	1.93%
2016	10,003	66.59%	3,991	26.57%	1,028	6.84%
2020	12,308	68.42%	5,247	29.17%	434	2.41%
2024	12,854	68.79%	5,472	29.29%	359	1.92%

=== Laws ===
Miami County was a prohibition, or "dry", county until the Kansas Constitution was amended in 1986 and voters approved the sale of alcoholic liquor by the individual drink with a 30 percent food sales requirement.

The county voted "No" on the 2022 Kansas abortion referendum, an anti-abortion ballot measure, by 52% to 48% despite backing Donald Trump with 68% of the vote to Joe Biden's 29% in the 2020 presidential election.

== Education ==
At one time in its history, Miami County had more than 100 schools. While most of those school buildings either no longer exist, or have been vacant for many years, the Rock Creek School at 231st & Pressonville, a one-room schoolhouse built in 1910, was used as a school until 1966. The residents near it in the northwest corner of Miami County, purchased the red brick schoolhouse from the school district for $1. Today, the schoolhouse is still used as a township hall to hold meetings, suppers, and other community events. In 1878, a Normal School, one of five in the state of Kansas, was established in Paola by Professor John Wherrell, which flourished for six years. Notable students of the Normal School were: U.S. Senator Chester I. Long, and the father of peanuts George Washington Carver.

=== Unified school districts ===
School districts include:

- Blue Valley USD 229
- Gardner Edgerton USD 231
- Louisburg USD 416
- Osawatomie USD 367
- Paola USD 368
- Spring Hill USD 230
- Wellsville USD 289

== Communities ==
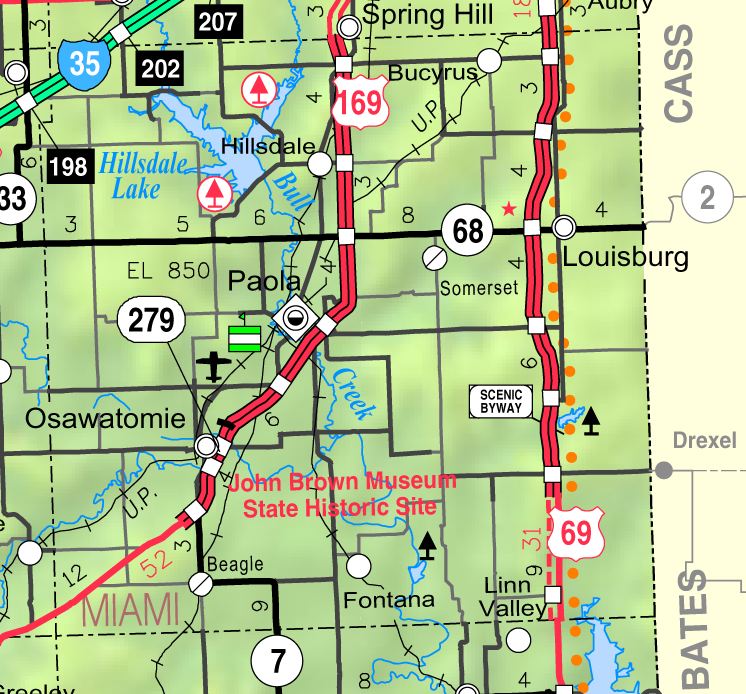
2005 map of Miami County (map legend)

List of townships / incorporated cities / unincorporated communities / extinct former communities within Miami County.

=== Cities ===
‡ means a community has portions in an adjacent county.

- Fontana
- Louisburg
- Osawatomie
- Paola (county seat)
- Spring Hill‡

=== Unincorporated communities ===
† means a community is designated a Census-Designated Place (CDP) by the United States Census Bureau.

- Beagle
- Block
- Bucyrus†
- Hillsdale†
- Jingo
- New Lancaster
- Somerset†
- Stanton
- Wagstaff
- Wea

=== Townships ===
Miami County is divided into thirteen townships. The cities of Louisburg, Osawatomie, Paola, and Spring Hill are considered governmentally independent and are excluded from the census figures for the townships. In the following table, the population center is the largest city (or cities) included in that township's population total, if it is of a significant size.

Township	FIPS	Population center	Population	Population density /km^{2} (/sq mi)	Land area km^{2} (sq mi)	Water area km^{2} (sq mi)	Water %	Geographic coordinates
Marysville	45100		2,575	20 (51)	131 (50)	12 (5)	8.28%	38°40′48″N 94°51′31″W
Miami	46100		506	4 (10)	126 (48)	1 (0)	0.53%	38°27′56″N 94°44′47″W
Middle Creek	46225		1,649	11 (28)	151 (58)	1 (1)	0.89%	38°34′8″N 94°42′32″W
Mound	48700		705	8 (22)	83 (32)	0 (0)	0.06%	38°25′32″N 94°58′56″W
Osage	53175		649	6 (16)	106 (41)	0 (0)	0.46%	38°26′0″N 94°50′58″W
Osawatomie	53250		794	9 (23)	90 (35)	0 (0)	0.12%	38°29′7″N 94°58′53″W
Paola	54275		1,100	16 (40)	71 (27)	0 (0)	0.65%	38°33′48″N 94°51′44″W
Richland	59475		1,758	11 (27)	166 (64)	16 (6)	8.89%	38°40′23″N 95°0′11″W
Stanton	67925		925	9 (23)	103 (40)	0 (0)	0.37%	38°32′51″N 95°0′32″W
Sugar Creek	68825		449	4 (11)	104 (40)	1 (0)	0.63%	38°26′40″N 94°40′14″W
Ten Mile	70125		1,259	10 (27)	121 (47)	1 (0)	0.51%	38°40′12″N 94°45′41″W
Valley	72950		1,478	16 (41)	93 (36)	0 (0)	0.37%	38°30′54″N 94°52′25″W
Wea	76225		1,836	16 (41)	117 (45)	1 (0)	0.43%	38°39′39″N 94°40′49″W
Sources: "Census 2000 U.S. Gazetteer Files". U.S. Census Bureau, Geography Division. Archived from the original on August 2, 2002.

== See also ==
- Flint Hills Trail
- National Register of Historic Places listings in Miami County, Kansas

Community information for Kansas

- Kansas locations by per capita income
- List of counties in Kansas
- List of townships in Kansas
- List of cities in Kansas
- List of unincorporated communities in Kansas
- List of ghost towns in Kansas
