= National Register of Historic Places listings in Miami County, Kansas =

Location of Miami County in Kansas

This is a list of the National Register of Historic Places listings in Miami County, Kansas.

This is intended to be a complete list of the properties and districts on the National Register of Historic Places in Miami County, Kansas, United States. The locations of National Register properties and districts for which the latitude and longitude coordinates are included below, may be seen in a map.

There are 20 properties and districts listed on the National Register in the county.

This National Park Service list is complete through NPS recent listings posted May 1, 2026.

== Current listings ==
	Name on the Register	Image	Date listed	Location	City or town	Description
1	Asylum Bridge	Asylum Bridge	January 4, 1990 (#89002187)	1st St. over the Marais des Cygnes River; 38°30′19″N 94°56′31″W	Osawatomie	part of the Metal Truss Bridges in Kansas 1861--1939 Multiple Property Submission (MPS)
2	John Brown Cabin	John Brown Cabin	March 24, 1971 (#71000319)	John Brown Memorial Park; 38°29′56″N 94°57′34″W	Osawatomie	
3	Carey's Ford Bridge	Carey's Ford Bridge	January 4, 1990 (#89002179)	Over the Marais des Cygnes River east of Osawatomie; 38°31′14″N 95°02′01″W	Osawatomie	part of the Metal Truss Bridges in Kansas 1861--1939 MPS
4	Congregational Church	Congregational Church	January 29, 2013 (#12001239)	315 6th St. 38°30′00″N 94°57′04″W	Osawatomie	
5	Creamery Bridge	Creamery Bridge	March 10, 1983 (#83000434)	FAS 456; 38°30′11″N 94°57′18″W	Osawatomie	part of the Rainbow Arch Marsh Arch Bridges of Kansas Thematic Resource (TR)
6	First Presbyterian Church of Paola	First Presbyterian Church of Paola	August 12, 2025 (#100012121)	110 East Peoria Street; 38°34′21″N 94°52′33″W	Paola	
7	Fowler and Baehr Buildings	Fowler and Baehr Buildings	April 7, 2025 (#100011631)	118 and 120 South Silver Street; 38°34′17″N 94°52′46″W	Paola	
8	Hillsdale Archeological District		May 12, 1977 (#77000590)	Address restricted	Paola	
9	Jackson Hotel	Jackson Hotel	July 9, 2008 (#08000646)	139 W. Peoria St. 38°34′22″N 94°52′46″W	Paola	
10	Jake's Branch of Middle Creek Bridge	Jake's Branch of Middle Creek Bridge	July 2, 1985 (#85001432)	Off U.S. Route 69; 38°31′11″N 94°42′57″W	Louisburg	part of the Masonry Arch Bridges of Kansas TR
11	Martin Farm		March 7, 2019 (#100003428)	31943 and 31860 W. 247th St. 38°40′48″N 94°57′41″W	Paola vicinity	
12	Miami County Courthouse	Miami County Courthouse	March 1, 1973 (#73000768)	East of the junction of Miami and Silver Sts. 38°34′16″N 94°52′42″W	Paola	
13	Miami County Mercantile Company	Miami County Mercantile Company	April 2, 2021 (#100006325)	121 South Pearl St. 38°34′16″N 94°52′41″W	Paola	
14	William Mills House	William Mills House	November 20, 1986 (#86003291)	212 1st St. 38°30′10″N 94°56′33″W	Osawatomie	
15	New Lancaster General Store	New Lancaster General Store	October 9, 2013 (#13000817)	36688 New Lancaster Rd. 38°27′45″N 94°43′58″W	New Lancaster	
16	New Lancaster Grange Hall, No. 223	New Lancaster Grange Hall, No. 223	October 9, 2013 (#13000818)	12655 W. 367th St. 38°27′44″N 94°43′58″W	New Lancaster	
17	Pottawatomie Creek Bridge	Pottawatomie Creek Bridge	March 10, 1983 (#83000433)	FAS 1604; 38°29′07″N 94°57′02″W	Osawatomie	part of the Rainbow Arch Marsh Arch Bridges of Kansas TR
18	Soldiers' Monument	Soldiers' Monument	September 17, 2012 (#12000386)	Northeast corner of Main & 9th Sts. 38°29′53″N 94°57′24″W	Osawatomie	
19	Ursuline Academy - Auditorium	Ursuline Academy - Auditorium	April 1, 2025 (#100011629)	905 E Wea Street; 38°34′13″N 94°52′04″W	Paola	
20	West Elementary School	West Elementary School	November 26, 2024 (#100011117)	1009 Pacific Avenue; 38°29′44″N 94°57′31″W	Osawatomie	

== See also ==
- List of National Historic Landmarks in Kansas
- National Register of Historic Places listings in Kansas
