= Eisenhower State Park =

Eisenhower State Park is the name of two state parks in the United States:

- Eisenhower State Park (Kansas), a state park in Kansas
- Eisenhower State Park (Texas), a state park in Texas
