= Derrick Jensen =

Derrick Jensen may refer to:

- Derrick Jensen (activist)
- Derrick Jensen (American football) (1956–2017)
