= Congregational Church (Osawatomie, Kansas) =

- U.S. National Register of Historic Places
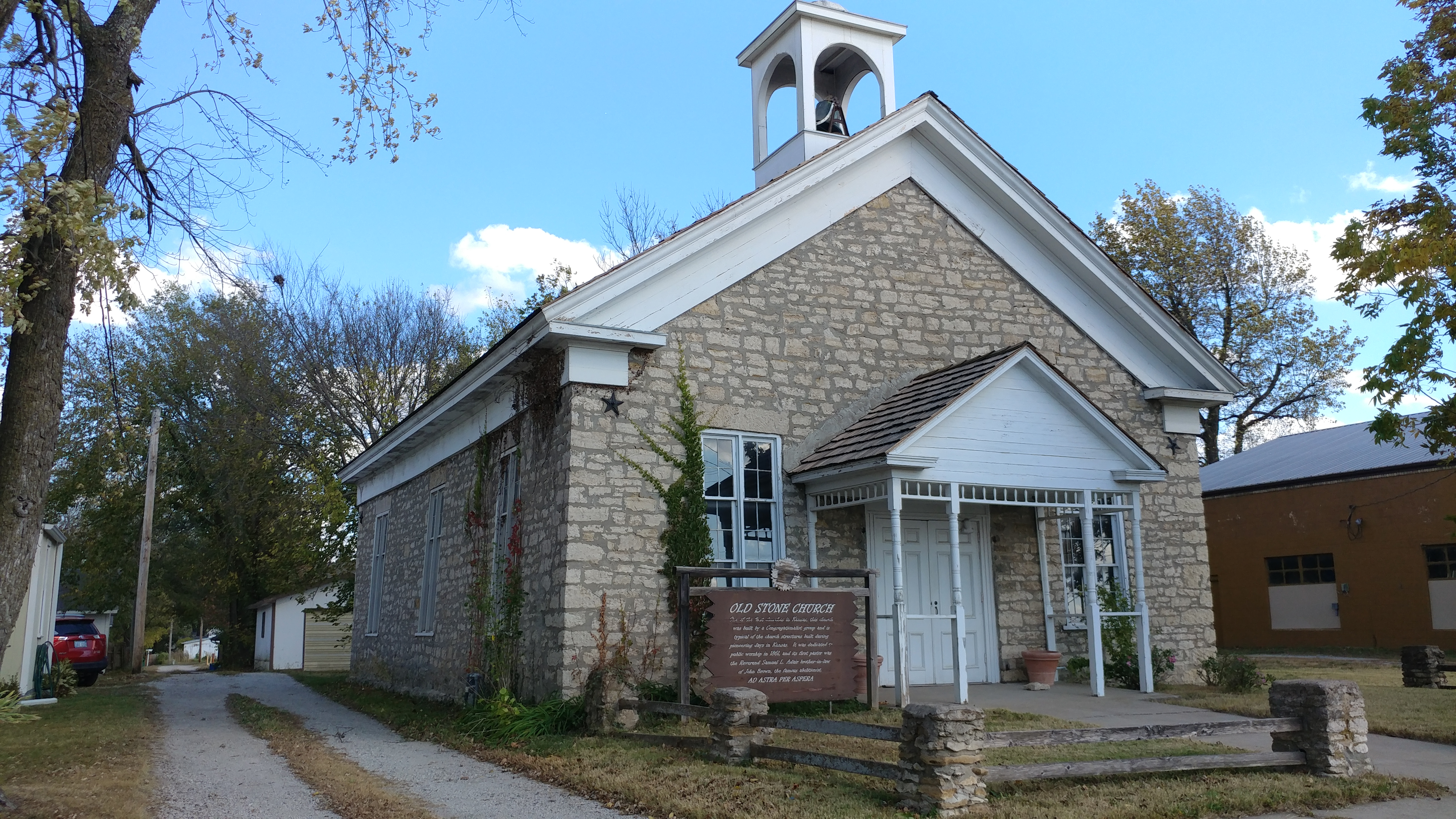

- Location within Kansas
- Location: 315 6th St., Osawatomie, Kansas
- Coordinates: 38.5001°N 94.9512°W
- Area: Less than one acre
- Built: 1858–61
- Architectural style: Greek Revival, Colonial Revival
- NRHP reference No.: 12001239
- Added to NRHP: January 29, 2013

The Congregational Church in Osawatomie, Kansas, at 315 6th St., was built in 1858–61. It was listed on the National Register of Historic Places in 2013.

It is associated with abolitionist John Brown, as its early preacher and leader, Samuel L. Adair, was married to John Brown's half-sister Florella Brown. After moving to the area with his family in 1855, Adair organized the church, including the first meeting on April 13, 1856, with six free-staters. Church services were held in the Adair cabin, which was later moved to and preserved in the John Brown Memorial Park and is itself listed on the National Register.

The National Register nomination for this church reads:

The battles of Osawatomie on June 7 and August 30 of that year devastated the town, and church minutes show that hymn books and the Sunday School library were "carried away or burned."... "The congregation reassembled in December 1857 and, in 1858, began the work of building a church home.

Samuel Adair worked to raise money, and with his son moved stone and walnut lumber, and actually built the church by 1861.

At that time, a severe drought caused many residents of Osawatomie and the Kansas Territory to leave and return a year later. The 1860 census of Osawatomie did not differentiate between the town and the township but showed a population of 304 – 167 males and 137 females. Florella returned to Ohio on what she called a "calling and begging trip" to collect donations enabling Adair to hire local craftsman to help complete the church. Among those contributing to the construction of the church were the ForeFathers' Fund, the Aid to Kansas Committee, the Congregational Church of Brookfield, Massachusetts and many individuals who "believed the church structure to be a crucial one ... in a time of crisis." Reverend Adair's own account stated that the total amount raised for the church was $2,045.97.11.

It is a one-room Congregational church, about 32 by 60 feet (9.8 m × 18.3 m) in plan, with elements of Greek Revival and Gothic Revival design. Greek Revival aspects include cornice returns. Gothic Revival aspects include multi-light windows and the type of interior window trim. It is built of Kansas limestone and has a cedar-shingled roof. Interior walls are plastered or mortared and have walnut wainscoting.

It has a belfry with its original iron bell, cast in Troy, New York, in 1868.

It was one of the first three Congregational churches organized in Kansas; the others were the Plymouth Congregational Church organized in Lawrence on October 15, 1854, and the First Congregational Church organized in Manhattan on January 6, 1856.

A photo from around 1860 shows the church, and is believed to be the earliest surviving photo of it.
