= Quenemo, Kansas =

City in Osage County, Kansas

- City
- Location within Osage County and Kansas

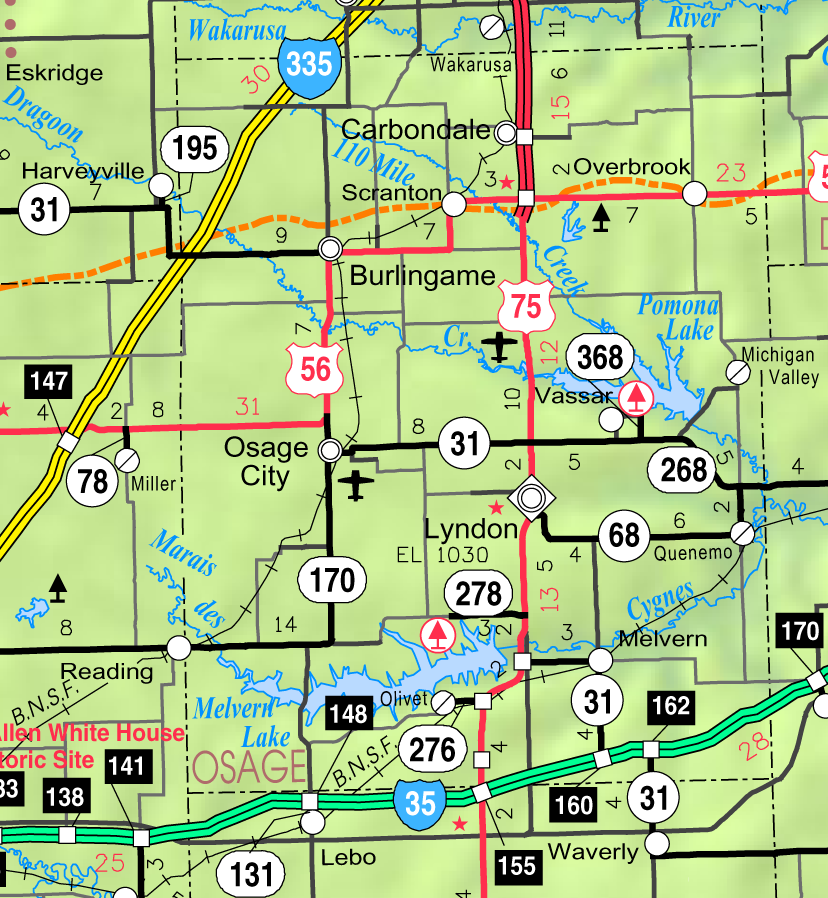
- KDOT map of Osage County (legend)
- Coordinates: 38°34′49″N 95°31′40″W
- Country: United States
- State: Kansas
- County: Osage
- Founded: 1870
- Platted: 1870
- Incorporated: 1885

Area
  - Total: 0.44 sq mi (1.15 km^{2})
  - Land: 0.44 sq mi (1.15 km^{2})
  - Water: 0 sq mi (0.00 km^{2})
- Elevation: 942 ft (287 m)

Population (2020)
  - Total: 288
  - Density: 649/sq mi (250/km^{2})
- Time zone: UTC-6 (CST)
  - Summer (DST): UTC-5 (CDT)
- ZIP Code: 66528
- Area code: 785
- FIPS code: 20-58100
- GNIS ID: 479622
- Website: www.cityofquenemo.com

Quenemo is a city in Osage County, Kansas, United States, along the Marais des Cygnes River. As of the 2020 census, the population of the city was 288.

== History ==
Quenemo was laid out about 1870. Quenemo was the name of a Sac and Fox Indian chief. A fire in 1878 destroyed much of the town. Quenemo experienced rapid growth in 1884 after the AT&SF railroad was built through it.

During the turn of the 20th century, the town was the base of operation for Orrin Robertson, a prominent quack who operated a sanitarium in the town, as well as the so-called "American University of Anthropology", which offered diplomas by mail.

== Geography ==
Quenemo is located at 38°34′49″N 95°31′40″W (38.580413, -95.527895). According to the United States Census Bureau, the city has a total area of 0.44 square miles (1.14 km^{2}), all land.

=== Climate ===
The climate in this area is characterized by hot, humid summers and generally mild to cool winters. According to the Köppen Climate Classification system, Quenemo has a humid subtropical climate, abbreviated "Cfa" on climate maps.

== Demographics ==
Historical population
Census	Pop.	Note	%±
1880	122		—
1890	643		427.0%
1900	682		6.1%
1910	556		−18.5%
1920	733		31.8%
1930	564		−23.1%
1940	557		−1.2%
1950	391		−29.8%
1960	434		11.0%
1970	429		−1.2%
1980	413		−3.7%
1990	369		−10.7%
2000	468		26.8%
2010	388		−17.1%
2020	288		−25.8%
U.S. Decennial Census

Quenemo is part of the Topeka, Kansas Metropolitan Statistical Area.

=== 2020 census ===
The 2020 United States census counted 288 people, 125 households, and 81 families in Quenemo. The population density was 648.6 per square mile (250.4/km^{2}). There were 162 housing units at an average density of 364.9 per square mile (140.9/km^{2}). The racial makeup was 93.06% (268) white or European American (92.36% non-Hispanic white), 0.0% (0) black or African-American, 0.69% (2) Native American or Alaska Native, 0.0% (0) Asian, 0.0% (0) Pacific Islander or Native Hawaiian, 0.0% (0) from other races, and 6.25% (18) from two or more races. Hispanic or Latino of any race was 0.69% (2) of the population.

Of the 125 households, 24.8% had children under the age of 18; 42.4% were married couples living together; 18.4% had a female householder with no spouse or partner present. 28.0% of households consisted of individuals and 11.2% had someone living alone who was 65 years of age or older. The average household size was 2.8 and the average family size was 2.9. The percent of those with a bachelor's degree or higher was estimated to be 2.8% of the population.

17.7% of the population was under the age of 18, 8.3% from 18 to 24, 21.2% from 25 to 44, 33.3% from 45 to 64, and 19.4% who were 65 years of age or older. The median age was 46.6 years. For every 100 females, there were 83.4 males. For every 100 females ages 18 and older, there were 79.5 males.

The 2016–2020 5-year American Community Survey estimates show that the median household income was $41,000 (with a margin of error of +/- $19,289) and the median family income was $45,625 (+/- $26,778). Males had a median income of $38,750 (+/- $11,254) versus $21,513 (+/- $4,733) for females. The median income for those above 16 years old was $25,774 (+/- $3,801). Approximately, 28.2% of families and 24.2% of the population were below the poverty line, including 33.7% of those under the age of 18 and 21.4% of those ages 65 or over.

=== 2010 census ===
As of the census of 2010, there were 388 people, 139 households, and 90 families residing in the city. The population density was 881.8 inhabitants per square mile (340.5/km^{2}). There were 178 housing units at an average density of 404.5 per square mile (156.2/km^{2}). The racial makeup of the city was 93.3% White, 1.3% African American, 2.6% Native American, 0.3% from other races, and 2.6% from two or more races. Hispanic or Latino of any race were 1.8% of the population.

There were 139 households, of which 39.6% had children under the age of 18 living with them, 44.6% were married couples living together, 9.4% had a female householder with no husband present, 10.8% had a male householder with no wife present, and 35.3% were non-families. 25.9% of all households were made up of individuals, and 7.2% had someone living alone who was 65 years of age or older. The average household size was 2.79 and the average family size was 3.44.

The median age in the city was 32.3 years. 31.7% of residents were under the age of 18; 9.3% were between the ages of 18 and 24; 23.2% were from 25 to 44; 28.4% were from 45 to 64; and 7.5% were 65 years of age or older. The gender makeup of the city was 54.1% male and 45.9% female.

=== 2000 census ===
As of the census of 2000, there were 468 people, 169 households, and 128 families residing in the city. The population density was 1,121.9 inhabitants per square mile (433.2/km^{2}). There were 192 housing units at an average density of 460.3 per square mile (177.7/km^{2}). The racial makeup of the city was 93.16% White, 0.21% African American, 2.99% Native American, and 3.63% from two or more races. Hispanic or Latino of any race were 0.43% of the population.

There were 169 households, out of which 42.0% had children under the age of 18 living with them, 56.8% were married couples living together, 16.0% had a female householder with no husband present, and 23.7% were non-families. 21.3% of all households were made up of individuals, and 5.3% had someone living alone who was 65 years of age or older. The average household size was 2.77 and the average family size was 3.16.

In the city, the population was spread out, with 34.0% under the age of 18, 7.1% from 18 to 24, 29.7% from 25 to 44, 20.7% from 45 to 64, and 8.5% who were 65 years of age or older. The median age was 31 years. For every 100 females, there were 100.9 males. For every 100 females age 18 and over, there were 103.3 males.

The median income for a household in the city was $25,000, and the median income for a family was $28,854. Males had a median income of $27,019 versus $14,375 for females. The per capita income for the city was $9,943. About 19.4% of families and 24.0% of the population were below the poverty line, including 30.1% of those under the age of 18 and none of those aged 65 or over.

== Education ==
The community is served by Marais des Cygnes Valley USD 456 public school district. The district high school is Marais des Cygnes Valley High School. Mascot is Trojans.

Prior to school unification, the Quenemo High School Buffaloes won the Kansas State High School boys class BB basketball championship in 1960.

== Parks and Recreation ==
- Pomona State Park
