= Osawatomie State Hospital =

Geography
- Location: 500 State Hospital Drive, Osawatomie, Kansas, United States
- Coordinates: 38.510246°N 94.94011°W

Organization
- Type: Specialist

Services
- Speciality: Psychiatric

History
- Founded: 1866

Links
- Website: www.kdads.ks.gov/state-hospitals-and-institutions/osawatomie-state-hospital
- Lists: Hospitals in Kansas

Osawatomie State Hospital is a public psychiatric hospital in the U.S. state of Kansas, located in the city of Osawatomie, Kansas. Established by the Kansas legislature in 1863 and opened in 1866, it is the oldest operating psychiatric hospital in the state of Kansas. It has been named "Kansas Insane Asylum" and the "State Insane Asylum" but was officially changed to its present name in 1901.

== History ==
=== Establishment and early years ===
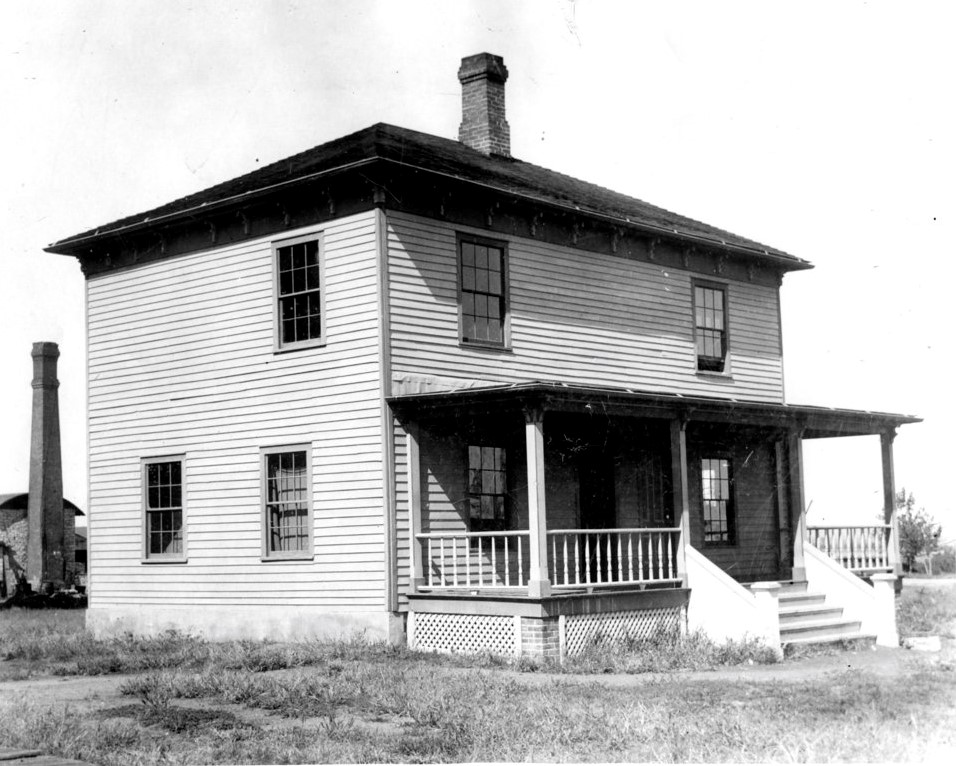
"The Lodge"

The initial steps towards establishing an asylum for the mentally ill in Kansas can be traced back to the territorial legislature's act of 1855. This act provided legal guardians for those deemed to have an "unsound mind" and, beginning in 1859, "habitual drunkards". Guardians were tasked with managing the estates of their wards and reporting to judicial authorities.

On March 2, 1863, Kansas Governor Thomas Carney signed act that appointed a commission to identify a suitable location for the state's first mental hospital, "some point within the township of Osawatomie township, in the county of Miami". On October 17, 1863, commissioners announced they had selected a site north of Osawatomie township in Miami County near the Marais des Cygnes River, which was donated by local minister Samuel L. Adair.

Kansas Hospital for the Insane, which was also known as the State Insane Asylum or the State Lunatic Asylum, officially opened on November 1, 1866, and admitted it first patient on November 5 of that year. The first building was a small, two-story renovated farmhouse called "The Lodge" and housed only 10–12 patients. Dr. Charles O. Gause, a proponent of rehabilitation and "moral treatment", assumed the role of the first superintendent, with his wife, Levisa, serving as the matron.

Two new wards were also added to the hospital's site in 1868 to accommodate additional patients. The same year, the Kansas legislature allocated funds for a large permanent structure. The architect, John G. Haskell, designed the building based on the recommendations of Dr. Thomas Story Kirkbride, a prominent figure in asylum design at the time. This architectural style, known as the Kirkbride Plan, emphasized improved living conditions and better access to natural light and ventilation for patients. Construction on the project, which became known as "Old Main", took over a decade to complete.

=== The Knapp Era ===
Dr. Abram H. Knapp served as superintendent from 1873 to 1877 and from 1878 to 1892. Dr. Knapp advocated for much stricter patient management and implemented practices focused on efficiency and economy, practices that many staff strongly opposed and staged a walkout over.

On March 8, 1880, a fire originating in the attic of the executive building caused significant damage, although the west and east wings of the hospital were able to be saved.

Dr. Knapp's administration saw the addition of the Knapp Building in 1892, designated for chronic male patients. This period also highlighted the evolving philosophies of mental healthcare. While moral treatment approaches gained traction initially, economic factors and a rise in the patient population led to a shift towards more custodial care models.

The need for additional space continued, and the Adair Building was constructed in 1895 to house chronically ill female patients. This building was named after Reverend Samuel Adair, a key figure in the asylum's establishment. The late 19th century also witnessed growing concerns about attendant-to-patient ratios and staff working conditions. Articles from the time highlighted the challenges faced by understaffed and overworked personnel.

=== The Uhls Era ===
Dr. Lyman Uhls' appointment as superintendent in 1899 marked a turning point. He focused on improving patient care and advocated for a more therapeutic approach. Dr. Uhls implemented educational programs for staff to enhance their ability to provide better care. He also fostered a more collaborative relationship between the hospital and the surrounding community.

This period saw significant advancements, including the establishment of a baseball team, a two-year nursing school, a policy allowing female nurses to care for male patients, and the introduction of electrotherapy as a treatment option. In 1901, the name of the institution was changed from Kansas State Insane Asylum to Kansas State Hospital at Osawatomie, reflecting a shift in focus towards treatment and rehabilitation during the era. That same year, construction began on a new infirmary to treat patients with infectious diseases. Following severe floods in 1903 and 1904, the Kansas City Bridge Company was contracted to construct the "Asylum Bridge" over the Marais des Cygnes River in late 1905, reconnecting the hospital's south entrance to the city's First Street. Dr. Uhls resigned from the hospital in 1913 to establish a new hospital in Overland Park, Kansas.

== See also ==
- Topeka State Hospital
