= Marais des Cygnes Valley USD 456 =

Public school district in Melvern, Kansas

Address
- 105 SW Main St. Melvern, Kansas, 66510; United States
- Coordinates: 38°30′24.447″N 95°38′17.7504″W

District information
- Type: Public
- Grades: PreK to 12
- Superintendent: Brian Cordel
- Schools: 3
- NCES District ID: 2009480

Other information
- Board of Education: BOE Website
- Website: mdcv.org

Marais des Cygnes Valley USD 456 is a public unified school district headquartered in Melvern, Kansas, United States. The district includes the communities of Melvern, Olivet, Quenemo, and nearby rural areas.

Most of the district is in Osage County. A portion is in Franklin County.

== Administration ==
Marais des Cygnes Valley USD 456 is currently under the administration of Superintendent Brian Cordel.

== Board of education ==
The USD 456 Board of Education is currently under the leadership of President Greg McCurdy.

== Schools ==
The school district operates the following schools:

- Marais des Cygnes Valley High School in Melvern
- Marais des Cygne Valley Junior High School in Melvern
- Marais des Cygnes Valley Elementary School in Quenemo

== See also ==
- Kansas State Department of Education
- Kansas State High School Activities Association
- List of high schools in Kansas
- List of unified school districts in Kansas
