= Melvern, Kansas =

City in Osage County, Kansas

- City
- Location within Osage County and Kansas

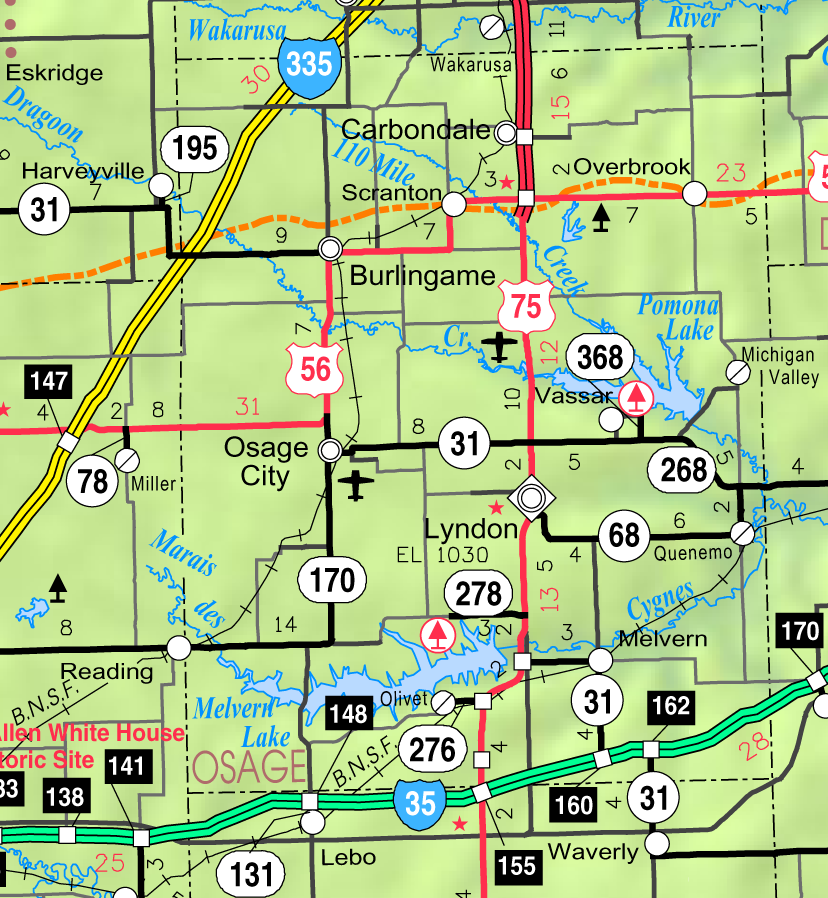
- KDOT map of Osage County (legend)
- Coordinates: 38°30′27″N 95°38′18″W
- Country: United States
- State: Kansas
- County: Osage
- Founded: 1870
- Platted: 1870
- Incorporated: 1883
- Named for: Malvern Hills

Area
  - Total: 0.36 sq mi (0.92 km^{2})
  - Land: 0.36 sq mi (0.92 km^{2})
  - Water: 0 sq mi (0.00 km^{2})
- Elevation: 1,017 ft (310 m)

Population (2020)
  - Total: 356
  - Density: 1,000/sq mi (390/km^{2})
- Time zone: UTC-6 (CST)
  - Summer (DST): UTC-5 (CDT)
- ZIP Code: 66510
- Area code: 785
- FIPS code: 20-45700
- GNIS ID: 477555
- Website: City webpage

Melvern is a city in Osage County, Kansas, United States, along the Marais des Cygnes River. As of the 2020 census, the population of the city was 356.

== History ==
Melvern was laid out in 1870. It was named after the Malvern Hills, in Worcestershire, England.

The first post office in Melvern was established in June 1870.

In 2004, the city was in the headlines after it was revealed that Lisa Montgomery brought a baby back to her house in this city, after she had murdered the baby's mother and crudely removed the baby from the womb.

== Geography ==
Melvern is located at 38°30′27″N 95°38′18″W (38.507446, -95.638332). According to the United States Census Bureau, the city has a total area of 0.35 square miles (0.91 km^{2}), all land.

== Demographics ==
Historical population
Census	Pop.	Note	%±
1880	103		—
1890	461		347.6%
1900	469		1.7%
1910	505		7.7%
1920	422		−16.4%
1930	445		5.5%
1940	368		−17.3%
1950	389		5.7%
1960	376		−3.3%
1970	455		21.0%
1980	481		5.7%
1990	423		−12.1%
2000	429		1.4%
2010	385		−10.3%
2020	356		−7.5%
U.S. Decennial Census

Melvern is part of the Topeka, Kansas Metropolitan Statistical Area.

=== 2020 census ===
The 2020 United States census counted 356 people, 151 households, and 92 families in Melvern. The population density was 1,000.0 per square mile (386.1/km^{2}). There were 180 housing units at an average density of 505.6 per square mile (195.2/km^{2}). The racial makeup was 91.57% (326) white or European American (91.01% non-Hispanic white), 0.28% (1) black or African-American, 0.56% (2) Native American or Alaska Native, 0.0% (0) Asian, 0.0% (0) Pacific Islander or Native Hawaiian, 0.84% (3) from other races, and 6.74% (24) from two or more races. Hispanic or Latino of any race was 1.69% (6) of the population.

Of the 151 households, 32.5% had children under the age of 18; 38.4% were married couples living together; 27.8% had a female householder with no spouse or partner present. 30.5% of households consisted of individuals and 17.2% had someone living alone who was 65 years of age or older. The average household size was 2.5 and the average family size was 2.9. The percent of those with a bachelor's degree or higher was estimated to be 9.3% of the population.

25.6% of the population was under the age of 18, 8.7% from 18 to 24, 21.1% from 25 to 44, 24.2% from 45 to 64, and 20.5% who were 65 years of age or older. The median age was 38.7 years. For every 100 females, there were 110.7 males. For every 100 females ages 18 and older, there were 105.4 males.

The 2016–2020 5-year American Community Survey estimates show that the median household income was $45,938 (with a margin of error of +/- $14,323) and the median family income was $51,042 (+/- $11,061). Males had a median income of $33,281 (+/- $14,979) versus $23,125 (+/- $10,185) for females. The median income for those above 16 years old was $30,714 (+/- $12,634). Approximately, 12.0% of families and 19.3% of the population were below the poverty line, including 19.1% of those under the age of 18 and 11.1% of those ages 65 or over.

=== 2010 census ===
As of the census of 2010, there were 385 people, 159 households, and 109 families living in the city. The population density was 1,100.0 inhabitants per square mile (424.7/km^{2}). There were 184 housing units at an average density of 525.7 per square mile (203.0/km^{2}). The racial makeup of the city was 96.6% White, 0.3% African American, 0.8% Asian, 0.3% from other races, and 2.1% from two or more races. Hispanic or Latino of any race were 2.3% of the population.

There were 159 households, of which 30.8% had children under the age of 18 living with them, 52.2% were married couples living together, 8.8% had a female householder with no husband present, 7.5% had a male householder with no wife present, and 31.4% were non-families. 27.0% of all households were made up of individuals, and 10% had someone living alone who was 65 years of age or older. The average household size was 2.39 and the average family size was 2.86.

The median age in the city was 40.8 years. 24.7% of residents were under the age of 18; 6% were between the ages of 18 and 24; 25.2% were from 25 to 44; 24.9% were from 45 to 64; and 19.2% were 65 years of age or older. The gender makeup of the city was 48.6% male and 51.4% female.

=== 2000 census ===
As of the census of 2000, there were 429 people, 173 households, and 120 families living in the city. The population density was 1,297.3 inhabitants per square mile (500.9/km^{2}). There were 202 housing units at an average density of 610.9 per square mile (235.9/km^{2}). The racial makeup of the city was 98.14% White, 0.70% Native American, 0.23% from other races, and 0.93% from two or more races. Hispanic or Latino of any race were 0.93% of the population.

There were 173 households, out of which 31.8% had children under the age of 18 living with them, 56.1% were married couples living together, 10.4% had a female householder with no husband present, and 30.6% were non-families. 28.9% of all households were made up of individuals, and 14.5% had someone living alone who was 65 years of age or older. The average household size was 2.47 and the average family size was 3.00.

In the city, the population was spread out, with 26.3% under the age of 18, 6.8% from 18 to 24, 28.9% from 25 to 44, 17.9% from 45 to 64, and 20.0% who were 65 years of age or older. The median age was 37 years. For every 100 females, there were 98.6 males. For every 100 females age 18 and over, there were 85.9 males.

The median income for a household in the city was $32,321, and the median income for a family was $50,833. Males had a median income of $30,313 versus $17,143 for females. The per capita income for the city was $16,206. About 5.3% of families and 9.2% of the population were below the poverty line, including 4.5% of those under age 18 and 9.2% of those age 65 or over.

== Education ==
The community is served by Marais des Cygnes Valley USD 456 public school district. The district high school is Marais des Cygnes Valley High School. Mascot is Trojans.

Prior to school unification, the Melvern High School mascot was Panthers. The Melvern Panthers won the Kansas State High School boys class B basketball championship in 1962.

== Parks and Recreation ==
- Melvern Lake

== Notable people ==
- Lisa Montgomery-murdered a pregnant woman and stole her baby from the womb to produce a baby after faking a pregnancy
