= Marais des Cygnes National Wildlife Refuge =

Protected land in Kansas, U.S.

- IUCN category IV (habitat/species management area)
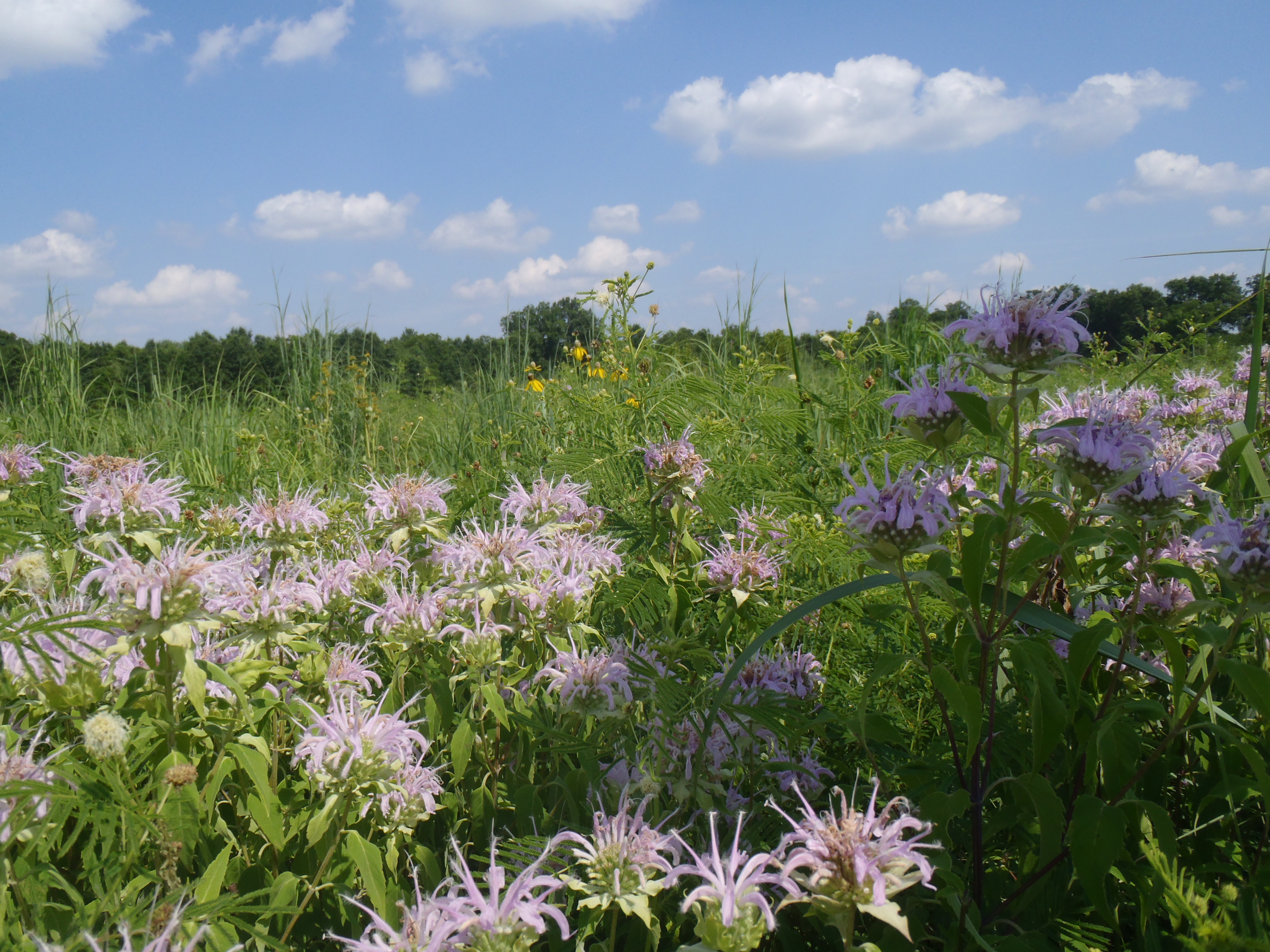
- Tallgrass prairie at Marais des Cygnes NWR

- Location within the United States
- Location: Linn County, Kansas, United States
- Nearest city: Pleasanton, Kansas
- Coordinates: 38°13′30″N 94°39′00″W
- Area: 7,500 acres (30 km^{2})
- Established: 1992
- Governing body: U.S. Fish and Wildlife Service
- Website: Marais des Cygnes National Wildlife Refuge

Marais des Cygnes National Wildlife Refuge (NWR) is located in Linn County, Kansas along the Marais des Cygnes River. The 7,500 acre (30 km^{2}) Refuge was established in 1992 to protect one of the northwesternmost examples of bottomland hardwood forest in the United States as well as the largest contiguous tract of bottomland hardwood forest in Kansas.

Marais des Cygnes means "marsh of swans" in French.

High quality stands of bottomland hardwood forest, upland oak-hickory forest, tallgrass prairie, seasonal and permanent wetlands, and riverine areas are found throughout the refuge. These unique areas harbor many species that are considered nationally or regionally threatened such as cerulean warbler, broadhead skink, flat floater mussel (Anodonta suborbiculata), and Mead's milkweed.

More than 30 species of warblers migrate through or nest on the refuge. The refuge also is known to harbor 30 species of mussels. Other interesting species are raccoons, badgers, minks, coyotes, skunks, beavers, muskrats, river otters, two species of fox, bobcats, paddlefish, crawfish frogs, scissor-tailed flycatchers, loggerhead shrike, and red-shouldered hawks. The refuge provides a rare opportunity to view high quality examples of a number of uncommon plant and animal communities all within a short distance of each other. Some of these communities are rare throughout North America, including bottomland hardwood forest, which has been reduced by 80% nationally, and tallgrass prairie, which has been reduced by 99% nationally.

== Recreational opportunities ==
- Boating
- Fishing
- Hiking
- Hunting

== Directions ==
Marais des Cygnes NWR is located 39 miles (63 km) south of the Kansas City metropolitan area along U.S. Highway 69. At the intersection of U.S. Highway 69 and Kansas Highway 52, travel east 1 1/4 mile (2 km). The refuge office is located on the south side of Kansas Highway 52.
