= Bryan Sperry =

American college football player and coach

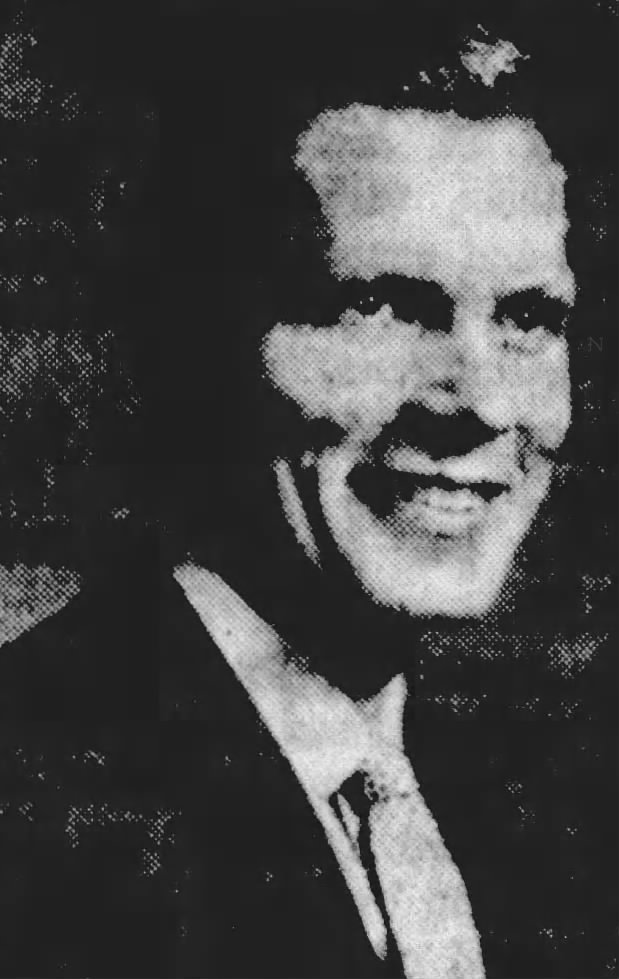
- Sperry in 1961

Biographical details
- Born: September 14, 1925; Osawatomie, Kansas, U.S.
- Died: May 12, 2021 (aged 95); Pittsburg, Kansas, U.S.

Playing career
- 1946–1948: Kansas
- Position: End

Coaching career (HC unless noted)
- 1957–1961: Shawnee

Jacob Bryan Sperry (September 14, 1925 – May 12, 2021) was an American football end and coach.

== Life and career ==
Sperry was born in Osawatomie, Kansas, the son of Peter Everett Sperry and Lulu Olleva Fink. He was an infantryman in the Battle of the Bulge during World War II. After his honorable discharge, he enrolled at the University of Kansas to play college football for the Kansas Jayhawks. He played on the team from 1946 to 1948, and graduated in 1950.

Sperry served as head football coach at Shawnee Mission North High School from 1957 to 1961. After coaching at Shawnee Mission, he worked as an associate professor of mathematics at Pittsburg State University, retiring in 1995.

In 2015, at age 89, Sperry gained significant national attention after scoring his dream touchdown in a football game at the University of Kansas. The Washington Post named his touchdown as "the greatest touchdown in Kansas football history".

== Personal life and death ==
In 1950, Sperry married Reita Mlle Hinkel. Their marriage lasted until her death in 2004.

Sperry died on May 12, 2021 in Pittsburg, Kansas, at the age of 95.
