= Asylum Bridge =

Truss bridge in Osawatomie, Kansas

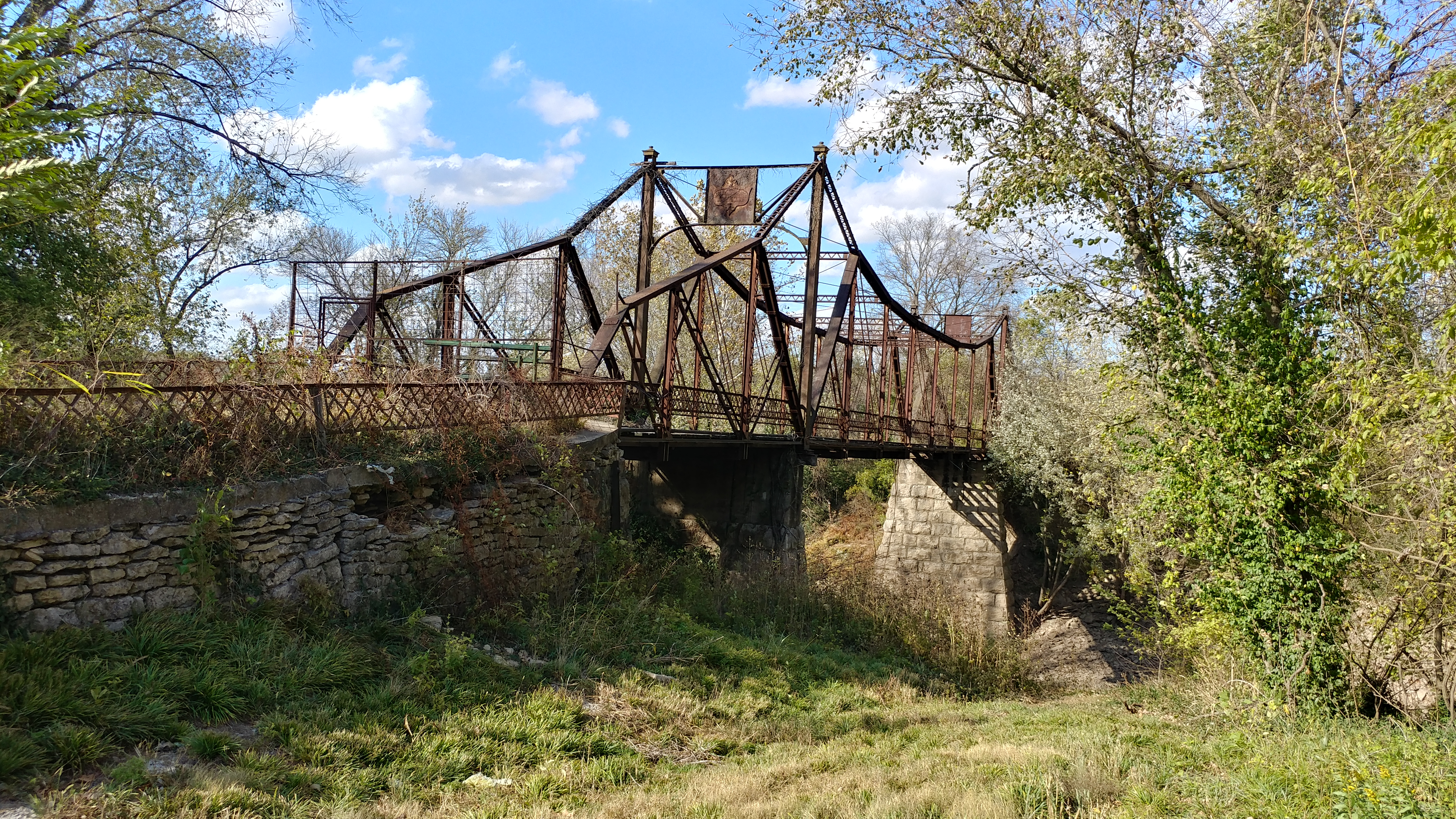
- Asylum Bridge in October 2020
- Coordinates: 38.5052°N 94.9420°W
- Crosses: Marais Des Cygnes River
- Locale: Osawatomie, Kansas, US

Characteristics
- Material: Steel
- Total length: 219 ft (67 m)
- Width: 16.5 ft (5.0 m)

History
- Construction end: 1905; 121 years ago
- Asylum Bridge
- U.S. National Register of Historic Places
- Location within Kansas Location within the United States
- Nearest city: Osawatomie, Kansas
- Coordinates: 38.5052°N 94.9420°W
- Built: 1905; 121 years ago
- Architect: Kansas City Bridge Company
- Architectural style: Parker truss
- NRHP reference No.: 89002187
- Added to NRHP: January 4, 1990

Location
- Interactive map of Asylum Bridge

Asylum Bridge, also known as the First Street Bridge, is a historic truss bridge in Osawatomie, Kansas, spanning the Marais des Cygnes River. Completed in 1905, it was built to connect the city's First Street to the south entrance of the Osawatomie State Hospital.

The bridge is the only known example in the United States to feature a reverse Parker truss design, a distinction that led to its placement on the National Register of Historic Places in 1990.

== History ==
=== Construction ===
Following the expensive floods of 1903 and 1904, Miami County required significant funds to repair and replace infrastructure. Among these projects was a new crossing at the "Asylum Crossing" in Osawatomie, intended to connect the south entrance of the Osawatomie State Hospital to First Street. Ten companies submitted bids for the project, and the Kansas City Bridge Company won the contract with a bid of $4,800.

Construction began in October 1905 and proceeded quickly, reaching completion by December 22, 1905. The project was steeped in local political controversy, particularly regarding the relocation of the old bridge spans and the names inscribed on the new bridge's plaque. While Commissioner Archie Lee's name was included, some local residents argued that former Commissioner Reuben Smith deserved the honor, as he had secured the original appropriation.

=== Closure ===
The bridge primarily served as a crossing to the main entrance of the Osawatomie State Hospital. However, it was closed to vehicular traffic in 1979. Though it remained open to pedestrians for a time after being closed to automobiles, it was permanently closed to all traffic in 1998 due to safety concerns and structural deterioration, including damage to its railings.

== Design ==
The Asylum Bridge is a single-span, pin-connected truss bridge measuring 219 ft (67 m) in length and 16.5 ft (5.0 m) in width with gas lights at each end. Its wooden deck sits approximately 21 ft (6.4 m) above the river bed.

The structure is classified as a "reverse Parker through truss". While a standard Parker truss features a polygonal top chord that curves upward to increase strength at the center, the Asylum Bridge's top chord curves downward. Additionally, the presence of towers at each abutment gives the bridge a cantilevered appearance.

At the time of its nomination to the National Register, this design was identified as unique to the bridge, and no similar examples have been found anywhere else in the country. The bridge's components were fabricated from wrought iron or steel, using sections of channel iron and angle stock tied together with single bar lacing. While individual components were riveted together, the main members of the bridge are joined at panel points using pins, a construction method that was becoming less common by the early 20th century.
