= Osawatomie High School =

Location
- 1200 Trojan Drive; Osawatomie, Kansas 66064; United States; 38.499°N 94.963°W

Information
- School type: Public, High School
- Established: 1893
- School district: USD 367
- CEEB code: 172260
- Principal: Malcolm Birnell
- Teaching staff: 23.25 (FTE)
- Grades: 9 to 12
- Gender: coed
- Enrollment: 280 (2023–2024)
- Student to teacher ratio: 12.04
- Campus type: Suburban
- Color: Red White
- Athletics: 4A
- Mascot: Trojan
- Rival: Anderson County Bulldogs, Central Heights Vikings
- Newspaper: Trojan Times
- Website: School Website

Osawatomie High School (OHS) is a public high school in Osawatomie, Kansas, United States. It is operated by Osawatomie USD 367 school district. Its mascot is Trojans, and the school colors are red and white. Located at 1200 Trojan Drive, the current enrollment in grades 9-12 is 310 students.

== Extracurricular activities ==
The Trojans compete in the Pioneer League and are classified as a 4A school, the third-largest classification in Kansas, according to the Kansas State High School Activities Association. Many graduates have gone on to participate in Division I, Division II, and Division III athletics.

=== Athletics ===
Fall

- Cross Country
- Fall Cheerleading
- Football
- Volleyball

Winter

- Boys Basketball
- Winter Cheerleading
- Boys Swimming
- Wrestling

Spring

- Baseball
- Golf
- Softball
- Girls Swimming
- Track and Field

=== Clubs ===
- Art Club
- Band
- Jazz Band
- Choir
- Singers
- Class Officers
- Debate Team
- DAZZLERS
- Drama Club
- FCCLA
- FFA
- KAY Club
- Renaissance
- SADD
- Scholar's Bowl
- Science Club
- Student Council
- Mental Health Club

== Technology ==
As part of a program initiated in 2005, OHS provides a 1:1 laptop program, meaning every high school student gets a laptop to use at school and home during the school year. The overall objective of the program is to provide access to technology for all students. The program is intended to increase student learning, increase student achievement, and better prepare students to face the challenges of the digital work force.

== Notable alumni ==
- Lynn Dickey (class of 1967) – NFL quarterback (Houston Oilers, Green Bay Packers)
- Derrick Jensen (class of 1974) – NFL tight end for the Oakland Raiders and scout for the Seattle Seahawks

== See also ==
- List of high schools in Kansas
- List of unified school districts in Kansas
