= Change for a Dollar =

2010 short film by Sharon Wright

Change for a Dollar is a short film by Sharon Wright. The short movie follows a seemingly homeless man wander through the course of a day, in which he gives away the dollar in change that was dumped into his tin can. Following the course of how the "dollar" was used, the viewer essentially gets an eye-opening opportunity to watch lives changed, based on the premise that it doesn't take much to make a difference.

The film was filmed in a single day in Osawatomie, Kansas on March 13, 2010, with the assistance of several Kansas City, Missouri film makers, and a small cast. To date the video as posted on YouTube (see "Change for a dollar") has had more than 2,700,000 views where it is stated to be "One of the MOST VIEWED films in schools nationwide".

The film has won several awards including two regional Emmy awards, and two Telly Awards in 2012, and several others. Famous film critic Roger Ebert commented in his December 7, 2011 newsletter that "It touched me. Sharon Wright. Remember that name."
