= Olivet, Kansas =

City in Osage County, Kansas

- City
- Location within Osage County and Kansas

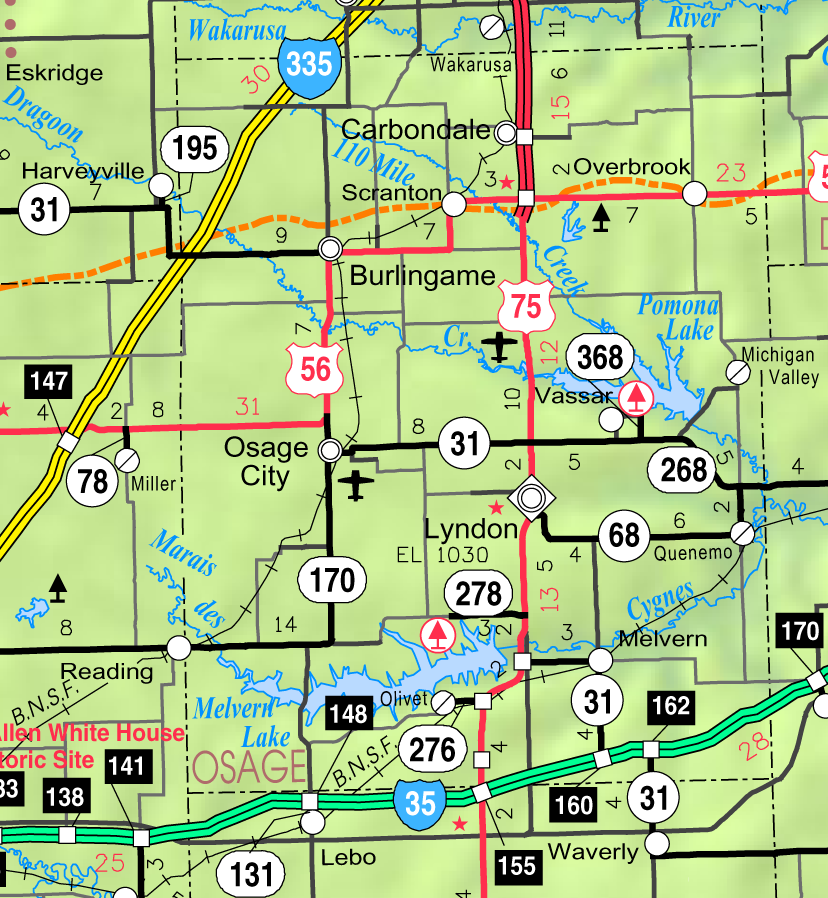
- KDOT map of Osage County (legend)
- Coordinates: 38°28′49″N 95°45′6″W
- Country: United States
- State: Kansas
- County: Osage
- Founded: 1869
- Incorporated: 1870

Area
  - Total: 0.25 sq mi (0.65 km^{2})
  - Land: 0.25 sq mi (0.65 km^{2})
  - Water: 0 sq mi (0.00 km^{2})
- Elevation: 1,152 ft (351 m)

Population (2020)
  - Total: 73
  - Density: 290/sq mi (110/km^{2})
- Time zone: UTC-6 (CST)
  - Summer (DST): UTC-5 (CDT)
- Area code: 785
- FIPS code: 20-52700
- GNIS ID: 477560

Olivet is a city in Osage County, Kansas, United States. As of the 2020 census, the population of the city was 73. It is located near the south side of Melvern Lake.

== History ==
Olivet was founded in 1869. By the end of its first year, the town contained a general store, a hotel, a sawmill, and a wagon and blacksmith shop. Olivet was incorporated as a city in 1870.

The post office in Olivet was first established in 1870, and it closed in 1971.

== Geography ==
Olivet is located at 38°28′49″N 95°45′06″W (38.480236, -95.751564). According to the United States Census Bureau, the city has a total area of 0.26 square miles (0.67 km^{2}), all land.

== Demographics ==
Historical population
Census	Pop.	Note	%±
1930	145		—
1940	172		18.6%
1950	127		−26.2%
1960	116		−8.7%
1970	64		−44.8%
1980	65		1.6%
1990	59		−9.2%
2000	64		8.5%
2010	67		4.7%
2020	73		9.0%
U.S. Decennial Census

Olivet is part of the Topeka, Kansas Metropolitan Statistical Area.

=== 2020 census ===
The 2020 United States census counted 73 people, 44 households, and 28 families in Olivet. The population density was 289.7 per square mile (111.8/km^{2}). There were 44 housing units at an average density of 174.6 per square mile (67.4/km^{2}). The racial makeup was 95.89% (70) white or European American (95.89% non-Hispanic white), 0.0% (0) black or African-American, 0.0% (0) Native American or Alaska Native, 0.0% (0) Asian, 0.0% (0) Pacific Islander or Native Hawaiian, 1.37% (1) from other races, and 2.74% (2) from two or more races. Hispanic or Latino of any race was 1.37% (1) of the population.

Of the 44 households, 18.2% had children under the age of 18; 43.2% were married couples living together; 13.6% had a female householder with no spouse or partner present. 29.5% of households consisted of individuals and 20.5% had someone living alone who was 65 years of age or older. The average household size was 1.5 and the average family size was 2.2. The percent of those with a bachelor's degree or higher was estimated to be 1.4% of the population.

13.7% of the population was under the age of 18, 2.7% from 18 to 24, 9.6% from 25 to 44, 24.7% from 45 to 64, and 49.3% who were 65 years of age or older. The median age was 64.8 years. For every 100 females, there were 82.5 males. For every 100 females ages 18 and older, there were 80.0 males.

The 2016–2020 5-year American Community Survey estimates show that the median family income was $61,250 (+/- $3,699). The median income for those above 16 years old was $25,000 (+/- $24,068). Approximately, 5.9% of families and 12.9% of the population were below the poverty line, including 66.7% of those under the age of 18 and 4.4% of those ages 65 or over.

=== 2010 census ===
As of the census of 2010, there were 67 people, 35 households, and 23 families residing in the city. The population density was 257.7 inhabitants per square mile (99.5/km^{2}). There were 45 housing units at an average density of 173.1 per square mile (66.8/km^{2}). The racial makeup of the city was 89.6% White, 4.5% Asian, and 6.0% from two or more races. Hispanic or Latino of any race were 1.5% of the population.

There were 35 households, of which 22.9% had children under the age of 18 living with them, 48.6% were married couples living together, 11.4% had a female householder with no husband present, 5.7% had a male householder with no wife present, and 34.3% were non-families. 28.6% of all households were made up of individuals, and 17.2% had someone living alone who was 65 years of age or older. The average household size was 1.91 and the average family size was 2.22.

The median age in the city was 56.8 years. 13.4% of residents were under the age of 18; 6.1% were between the ages of 18 and 24; 9% were from 25 to 44; 52.2% were from 45 to 64; and 19.4% were 65 years of age or older. The gender makeup of the city was 52.2% male and 47.8% female.

=== 2000 census ===
As of the census of 2000, there were 64 people, 34 households, and 16 families residing in the city. The population density was 254.2 inhabitants per square mile (98.1/km^{2}). There were 37 housing units at an average density of 147.0 per square mile (56.8/km^{2}). The racial makeup of the city was 98.44% White, and 1.56% from two or more races. Hispanic or Latino of any race were 1.56% of the population.

There were 34 households, out of which 11.8% had children under the age of 18 living with them, 44.1% were married couples living together, and 52.9% were non-families. 50.0% of all households were made up of individuals, and 29.4% had someone living alone who was 65 years of age or older. The average household size was 1.88 and the average family size was 2.75.

In the city, the population was spread out, with 12.5% under the age of 18, 4.7% from 18 to 24, 14.1% from 25 to 44, 46.9% from 45 to 64, and 21.9% who were 65 years of age or older. The median age was 51 years. For every 100 females, there were 88.2 males. For every 100 females age 18 and over, there were 100.0 males.

The median income for a household in the city was $32,188, and the median income for a family was $58,750. Males had a median income of $19,583 versus $17,250 for females. The per capita income for the city was $15,781. There were no families and 7.4% of the population living below the poverty line, including no under eighteens and 21.4% of those over 64.

== Education ==
The community is served by Marais des Cygnes Valley USD 456 public school district.
