= Derrick Jensen (American football) =

American football player (1956–2017)

No. 31
- Positions: Running back, tight end

Personal information
- Born: April 27, 1956; Waukegan, Illinois, U.S.
- Died: April 7, 2017 (aged 60); Panama City Beach, Florida, U.S.
- Listed height: 6 ft 1 in (1.85 m)
- Listed weight: 221 lb (100 kg)

Career information
- High school: Osawatomie (Osawatomie, Kansas)
- College: Texas–Arlington (1974–1977)
- NFL draft: 1978: 3rd round, 57th overall pick

Career history

Playing
- Oakland / Los Angeles Raiders (1978–1986)

Operations
- Seattle Seahawks (1991–2012) Scout

Awards and highlights
- As a player: 2× Super Bowl champion (XV, XVIII); Third-team All-American (1976)

Career NFL statistics
- Rushing yards: 780
- Rushing average: 3.5
- Rushing touchdowns: 5
- Receptions: 44
- Receiving yards: 384
- Receiving touchdowns: 3
- Stats at Pro Football Reference

Derrick Jensen (April 27, 1956 – April 7, 2017) was an American professional football running back and tight end who played in the National Football League (NFL). He played eight seasons for the Oakland / Los Angeles Raiders. He played college football for the Texas–Arlington Mavericks and was selected by the Raiders in the third round of the 1978 NFL draft.

Following his playing career, he worked as a scout for the Seattle Seahawks for 22 seasons, beginning in 1991.

== Early life and college ==
Jensen grew up in Osawatomie, Kansas. He attended Osawatomie High School, and led the Osawatomie Trojans to their second state championship in 1973. Osawatomie won its first state football championship in 1966 led by future Green Bay Packers quarterback Lynn Dickey. After graduating from high school, Jensen attended University of Texas at Arlington. Jensen was a two-time Southland Conference most valuable player playing for the Texas–Arlington Mavericks. He finished his career with 3,346 rushing yards, the first player in conference history to top 3,000 yards.

== Professional career ==
Jensen was selected by the Oakland Raiders with the 57th overall pick in the third round of the 1978 NFL draft. He played in 106 games, starting in 21 throughout his career, including a streak of 105 straight. He served as the captain of the Raiders special teams for five seasons and contributed a blocked punt, which he recovered for the first touchdown, in the Raiders 38–9 win over the Washington Redskins in Super Bowl XVIII. He was also part of the Raiders Super Bowl XV championship team. He finished his Raiders career with 780 yards on 224 carries, with five touchdowns. He added 44 receptions and three scores and returned an onside kick 33 yards for a touchdown against the New York Giants in 1980.

== Executive career ==
After he retired from the NFL, Jensen served as a scout for the Seattle Seahawks for 22 season, from 1991 through 2012.

== Personal life ==
Jensen's wife, pornography actress Erica Boyer, was killed as a result of a hit-and-run automobile accident on December 31, 2009. They had one son, Davis, who was 12 years old at the time of his mother's death.

== Death ==
Jensen was diagnosed with ALS (amyotrophic lateral sclerosis) in 2012. He died of complications from the disease on April 7, 2017, at his home in Panama City Beach, Florida.
