= Melvern Lake =

- Location within Kansas Location within the United States

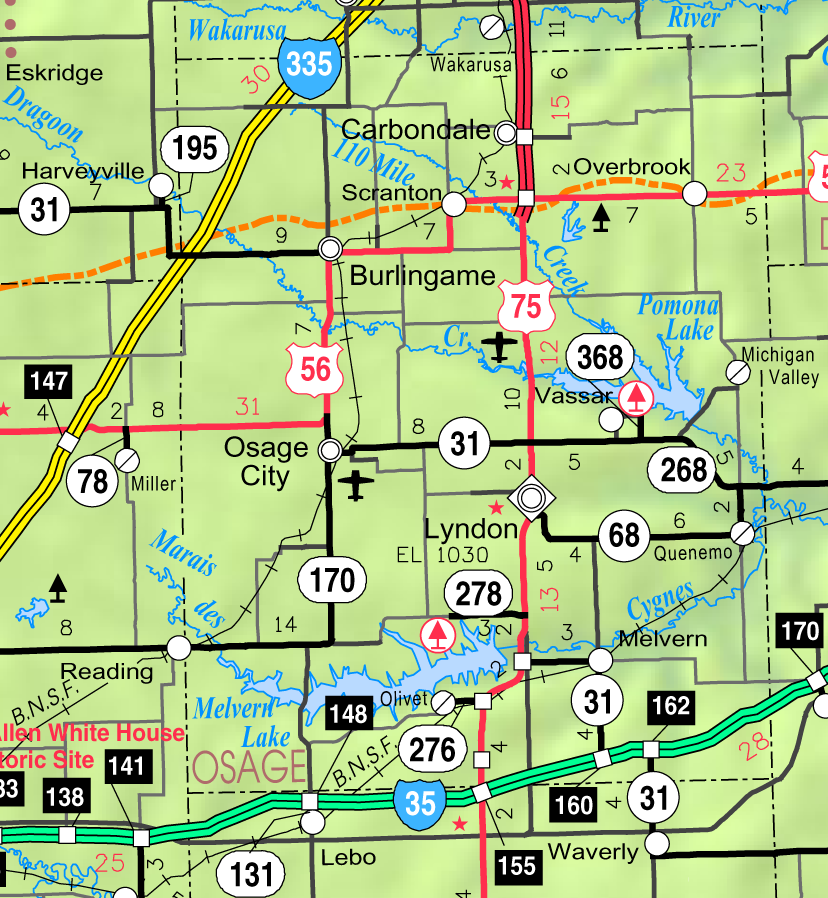
- KDOT map of Osage County (legend)
- Location: Osage County
- Coordinates: 38°29′23″N 95°47′57″W
- Type: Reservoir
- Primary inflows: Marais des Cygnes River
- Basin countries: United States
- Managing agency: U.S. Army Corps of Engineers
- Built: 1970
- Surface area: 10.8 sq mi (28 km^{2})
- Water volume: 363,000 acre-feet (0.448 km^{3}) Max 154,000 acre⋅ft (0.190 km^{3}) Normal
- Surface elevation: 1,033 ft (315 m)
- Settlements: Melvern, Olivet, Lyndon, Lebo

Melvern Dam is a dam in Osage County, Kansas.

The earthen dam was completed in 1970, and the reservoir completely filled in 1975, as a flood control project of the United States Army Corps of Engineers. The dam impounds the Marais des Cygnes River, notorious for its destructive flooding, notably in the Great Flood of 1951. The dam is 188 feet (57 m) high, is 9,650 feet (2,940 m) long at its crest, and is owned and operated by the United States Army Corps of Engineers.

The reservoir it creates, Melvern Lake, has a water surface of 10.8 square miles (28 km^{2}) and a maximum capacity of 363,000 acre-feet (0.448 km^{3}), although normal storage is 154,000 acre-feet (0.190 km^{3}). Recreation includes fishing, hunting, boating and camping in the five parks surrounding the lake (Outlet Park, Arrow Rock Park, Coeur d'Alene Park, Turkey Point Park, and Sun Dance Park) and the adjoining state park, Eisenhower State Park.

== See also ==
- List of Kansas state parks
- List of lakes, reservoirs, and dams in Kansas
- List of rivers of Kansas
