= Lynn Dickey =

American football player

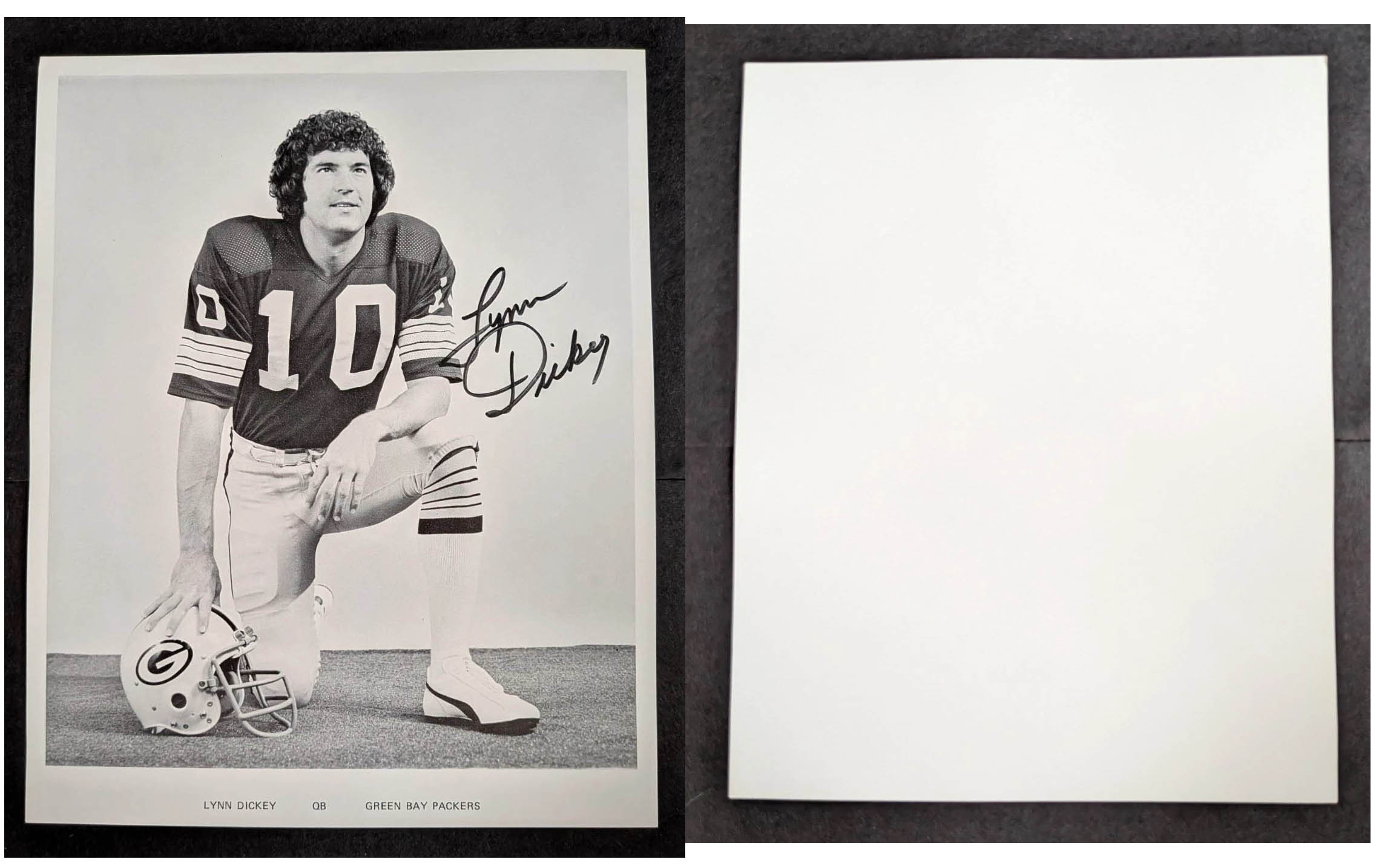
- Dickey with the Green Bay Packers in 1976

No. 10, 12
- Position: Quarterback

Personal information
- Born: Paola, Kansas, U.S.
- Listed height: 6 ft 3 in (1.91 m)
- Listed weight: 214 lb (97 kg)

Career information
- High school: Osawatomie (Osawatomie, Kansas)
- College: Kansas State (1968–1970)
- NFL draft: 1971: 3rd round, 56th overall pick

Career history
- Houston Oilers (1971–1975); Green Bay Packers (1976–1985)

Awards and highlights
- NFL passing touchdown leader (1983); NFL passing yards leader (1983); Green Bay Packers Hall of Fame; 2× First-team All-Big Eight (1969, 1970); Kansas State Wildcats No. 11 retired

Career NFL statistics
- Passing attempts: 3,125
- Passing completions: 1,747
- Completion percentage: 55.9%
- TD–INT: 141–179
- Passing yards: 23,322
- Passer rating: 70.9
- Stats at Pro Football Reference

Clifford Lynn Dickey is an American former professional football player who was a quarterback for 15 seasons in the National Football League (NFL), primarily with the Green Bay Packers. He played college football for the Kansas State Wildcats and was selected in the third round of the 1971 NFL draft by the Houston Oilers, where he spent his first five seasons. Dickey was a member of the Packers for his remaining 10 seasons, leading them in 1982 to their first playoff appearance since 1972 and victory since 1967. He also led the league in passing touchdowns during the 1983 season. For his accomplishments with the franchise, he was inducted to the Green Bay Packers Hall of Fame in 1992.

== Early life ==
Born in Paola, Kansas, and raised in Osawatomie, Kansas, southwest of Kansas City, Dickey led Osawatomie High School to a state championship and graduated in 1967. Its football stadium is named after him, and his number "10" was retired by the school in January 1971.

== College career ==
Dickey was recruited to Kansas State University. Following his senior season in 1970, Dickey finished tenth in the voting for the Heisman Trophy and was named MVP of the North–South Shrine Game. His 6,208 career passing yards was the record at Kansas State for 38 years, until passed by Josh Freeman in 2008.

== Professional career ==
=== Houston Oilers ===
Dickey was selected in the third round of the 1971 NFL draft, 56th overall, by the Houston Oilers, where he played four seasons, splitting time with fellow 1971 draft pick Dan Pastorini (third overall). He and Pastorini were in competition for the starting quarterback role in 1972, and Dickey was having a good preseason. However, he suffered the first in a long line of serious injuries throughout his career, a dislocated and broken hip in the fourth preseason game, which cost him the rest of the year. Dickey started ten games with the Oilers, winning two overall, including Houston's lone win in the 1973 season.

=== Green Bay Packers ===
In 1976, he was traded to the Green Bay Packers in exchange for John Hadl. His Packers career got off to a rocky start. Dickey suffered a broken leg in 1977, causing him to miss two full calendar years. But by 1980 he was back as the starter. Dickey led the Packers to the 16-team playoffs in the strike-shortened 1982 season. The Packers won the opening round after Dickey went 19 of 26 (73%) for 286 yards with 4 touchdowns and no interceptions in a 41–16 triumph over the St. Louis Cardinals. Green Bay was eliminated the following week by the Dallas Cowboys in the divisional round after Dickey went 24 of 37 for 274 yards with 1 touchdown and 3 interceptions as the team fell 37–26.

Perhaps the high point of Dickey's NFL career came in 1983 when he powered the Packers' offense to a then-team record 429 points. His 4,458 yards that season served as the team record until being surpassed by Aaron Rodgers in 2011 and threw a career-best 32 touchdowns, the most in the NFL in 1983.

According to sportswriter Alex Rubenstein of SB Nation, Dickey's back-to-back performances on Sept. 4 and 11 of the 1983 season were the greatest by an NFL quarterback through a two-game stretch throughout the first 98 NFL seasons. If a QB rating were not artificially capped at 158.3, Dickey's rating across those two games would have been 164.1, a mark not reached again across multiple games until Peyton Manning in the 2003 playoffs; the first to surpass that mark in the regular season across two games was Patrick Mahomes in 2018. In the two games, a 41-38 win over the Houston Oilers followed by a 21-25 loss to the Pittsburgh Steelers, Dickey completed 41 of his 51 passes for 623 yards with eight touchdowns and 1 interception.

Dickey was named second-team All-NFC behind Joe Theismann. Dickey's Packers had beaten Theismann's Super Bowl champion Washington Redskins in a thrilling Monday Night Football game earlier that season (Washington kicker Mark Moseley missed a field goal in the closing seconds, preserving the Packers' 48–47 win). The game is included in NFL Network's program "Top Ten Quarterback Duels."

Dickey retired from professional football prior to the 1986 season after he was waived late in training camp. He holds Packers records for highest completion percentage in a game with a minimum of 20 attempts (19–21, 90.48%, versus New Orleans on December 13, 1981). His record for most passing yards in a 1980 game (418 versus Tampa Bay on October 12) was broken by Matt Flynn on January 1, 2012, with 480 yards. (Aaron Rodgers had 422 in a playoff game against the Arizona Cardinals); and highest average gain in a season (9.21 yards per attempt in 1983). The latter is an NFL single-season record for quarterbacks with 400 or more attempts.

== NFL career statistics ==
Year	Team	GP	Passing						
Year	Team	GP	Att	Cmp	Pct	Yds	TD	Int	Rtg
1971	HOU	7	57	19	33.3	315	0	9	13.3
1972	HOU	0	DNP						
1973	HOU	12	120	71	59.2	888	6	10	64.2
1974	HOU	14	113	63	55.8	704	2	8	50.9
1975	HOU	14	4	2	50.0	46	0	1	52.1
1976	GB	10	243	115	47.3	1,465	7	14	52.2
1977	GB	9	220	113	51.4	1,346	5	14	51.4
1978	GB	0	DNP						
1979	GB	5	119	60	50.4	787	5	4	71.7
1980	GB	16	478	278	58.2	3,529	15	25	70.0
1981	GB	13	354	204	57.6	2,593	17	15	79.0
1982	GB	9	218	124	56.9	1,790	12	14	75.3
1983	GB	16	484	289	59.7	4,458	32	29	87.3
1984	GB	15	401	237	59.1	3,195	25	19	85.6
1985	GB	12	314	172	54.8	2,206	15	17	70.4
Career		152	3,125	1,747	55.9	23,322	141	179	70.9

== Personal life ==
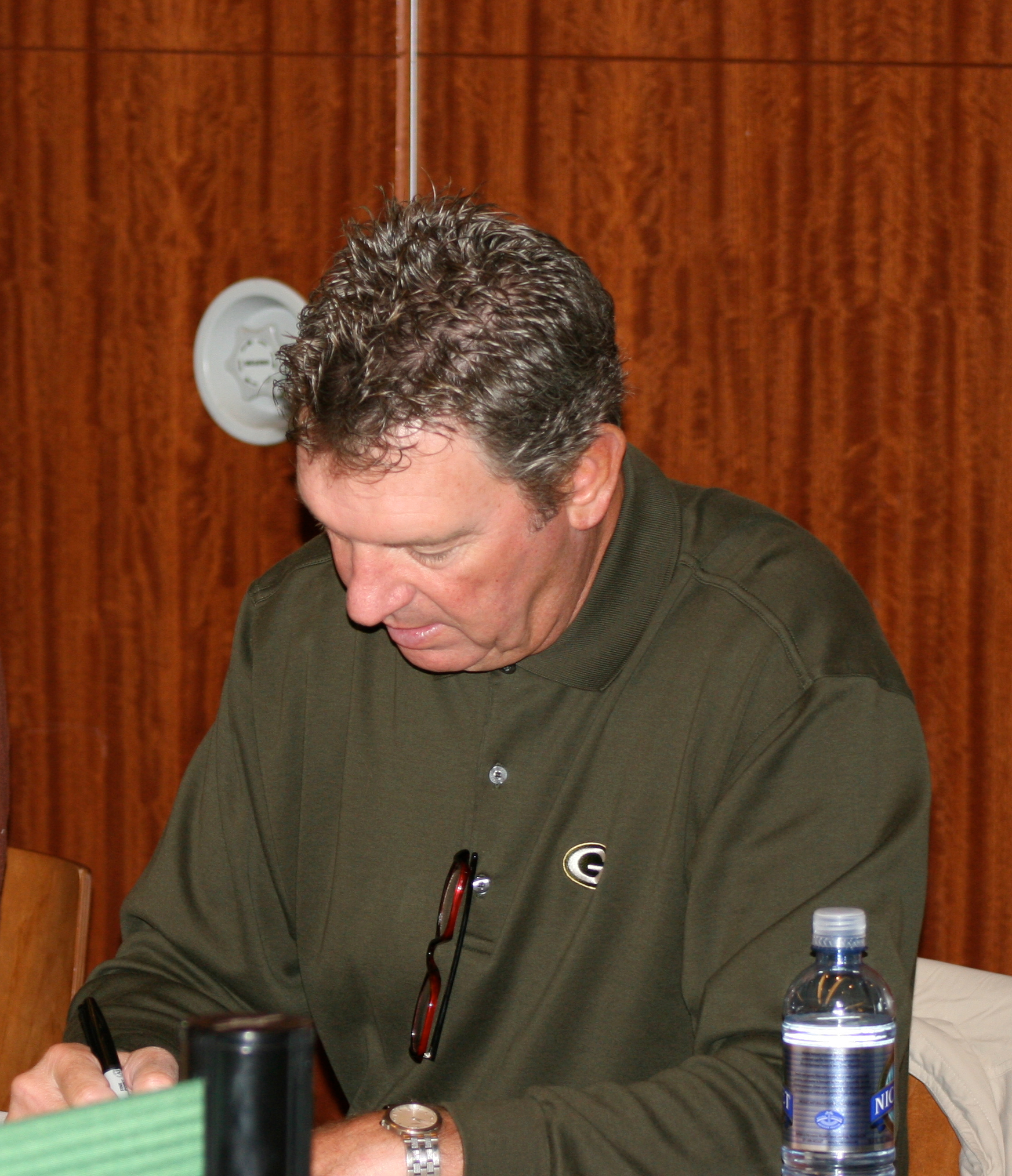
Dickey signing autographs in 2007

After retiring from football, Dickey relocated to the greater Kansas City area where he opened a football-themed restaurant which was unsuccessful.

== Honors ==
In 1996, when the Big Eight expanded to the Big 12 Conference, the Associated Press named Dickey as the All-Time Big Eight Quarterback. Kansas State University has retired the No. 11 to jointly honor Dickey and his successor at Kansas St., Steve Grogan. It is the only number retired by Kansas State's football program.

Dickey is a member of the Green Bay Packers Hall of Fame, Kansas Sports Hall of Fame, and Kansas State Hall of Fame.
