= New Lancaster, Kansas =

- Unincorporated community
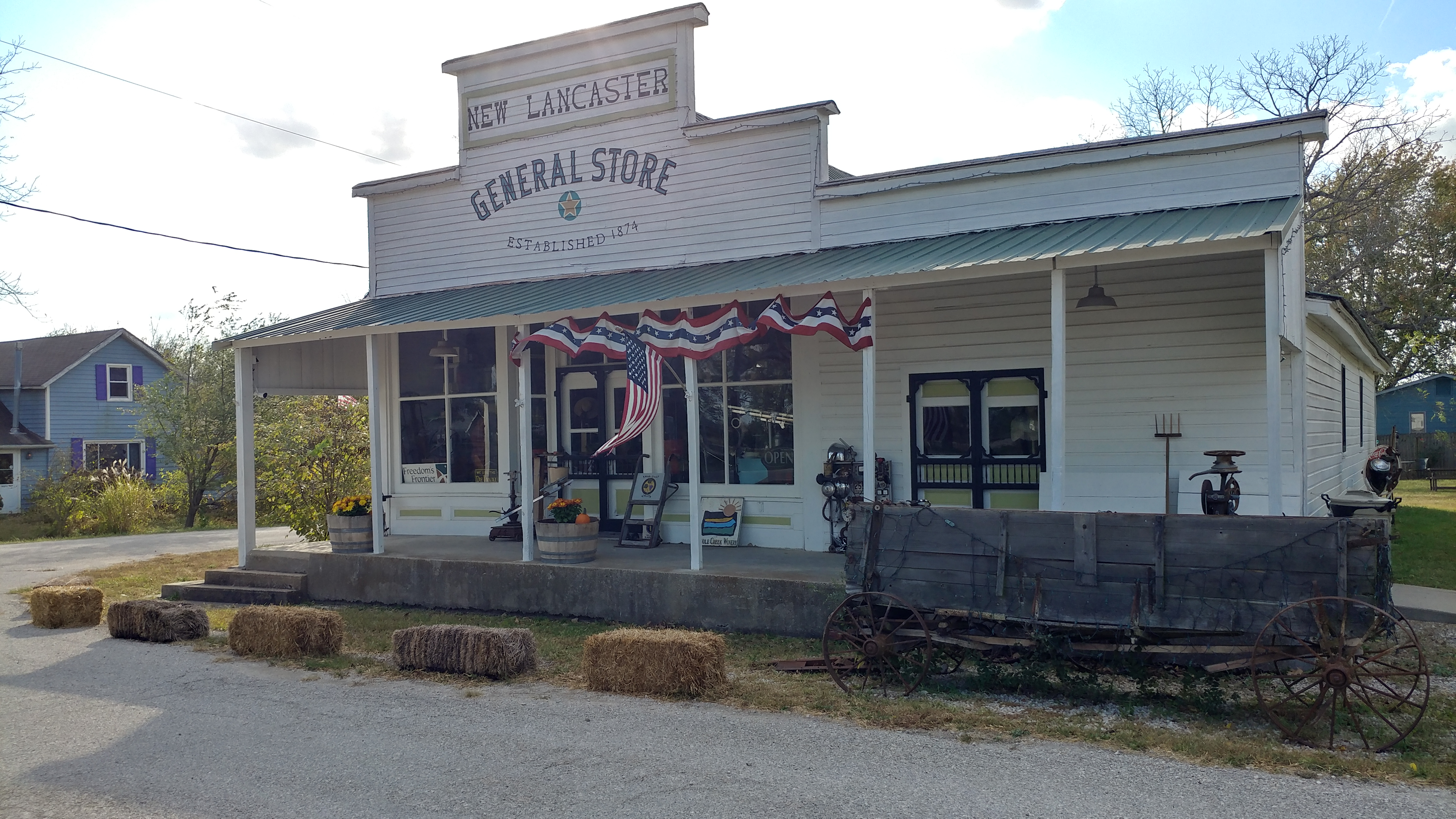
- General Store (2020)

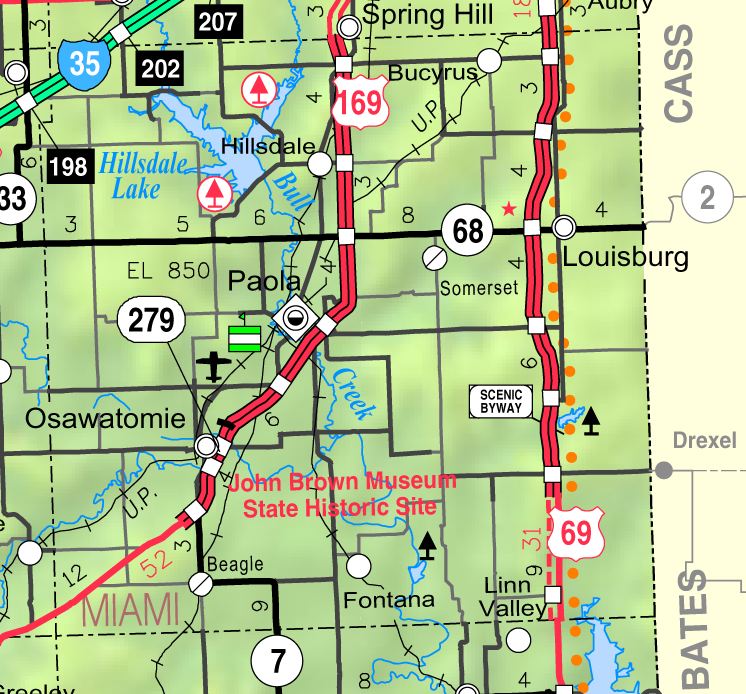
- KDOT map of Miami County (legend)

- Location within Kansas Location within the United States
- Coordinates: 38°27′45″N 94°43′59″W
- Country: United States
- State: Kansas
- County: Miami
- Elevation: 955 ft (291 m)
- Time zone: UTC-6 (CST)
  - Summer (DST): UTC-5 (CDT)
- Area code: 913
- FIPS code: 20-50375
- GNIS ID: 477646

New Lancaster is an unincorporated community in Miami County, Kansas, United States. It is part of the Kansas City metropolitan area.

== History ==
A post office was opened in New Lancaster in 1859, and remained in operation until it was discontinued in 1906.

New Lancaster General store is the oldest continuing shop in Miami County.
