= Marais des Cygnes Valley High School =

Marais des Cygnes Valley Junior-Senior High School

Location
- 508 NE Main Street; Melvern, Osage, Kansas 66510; United States; 38°30′37.6776″N 95°38′16.2198″W

Information
- School type: Public, Public secondary school
- Status: Open
- School board: BOE website
- School district: MdCV USD 456
- NCES District ID: 2009480
- CEEB code: 171985
- NCES School ID: 200948001165
- Principal: Duane Ford
- Grades: 9-12
- Gender: coed
- Enrollment: 68 (2023-2024)
- Colors: Orange; Blue
- Athletics: Yes
- Athletics conference: Lyon County League
- Sports: Yes
- Mascot: Trojans
- Team name: Marais des Cygnes Valley Trojans
- Affiliations: KSHSAA
- Website: MdCV High School

Marais des Cygnes Valley High School is a fully accredited public high school located in Melvern, Kansas, in the Marais des Cygnes Valley USD 456 school district, serving students in grades 6-12. Marais des Cygnes Valley has an enrollment of approximately 108 students. The principal is Duane Ford. The school mascot is the Trojans and the school colors are orange and blue.

== Extracurricular activities ==
The Trojans compete in the Lyon County League. The KSHSAA classification switches between 2A and 1A, the two lowest classes according to KSHSAA. The school also has a variety of organizations for the students to participate in.

=== Athletics ===
The Trojans compete in the Lyon County League and are classified as either 2A or 1A, two of the lowest classifications in Kansas according to KSHSAA. A majority of the sports are coached by the same coaches. Marais des Cygnes Valley High School offers the following sports:

Fall Sports

- Cheerleading
- Football
- Volleyball

Winter

- Boys' Basketball
- Girls' Basketball
- Cheerleading

Spring

- Boys' Track and Field
- Girls' Track and Field
- Baseball
- Softball

=== Organizations ===
- Future Business Leaders of America
- Family, Career and Community Leaders of America (FCCLA)
- Future Farmers of America (FFA)
- National Honor Society
- Student Council (StuCo)

== See also ==
- List of high schools in Kansas
- List of unified school districts in Kansas
