= John Brown Museum (Osawatomie, Kansas) =

Historical museum

- John Brown Cabin
- U.S. National Register of Historic Places
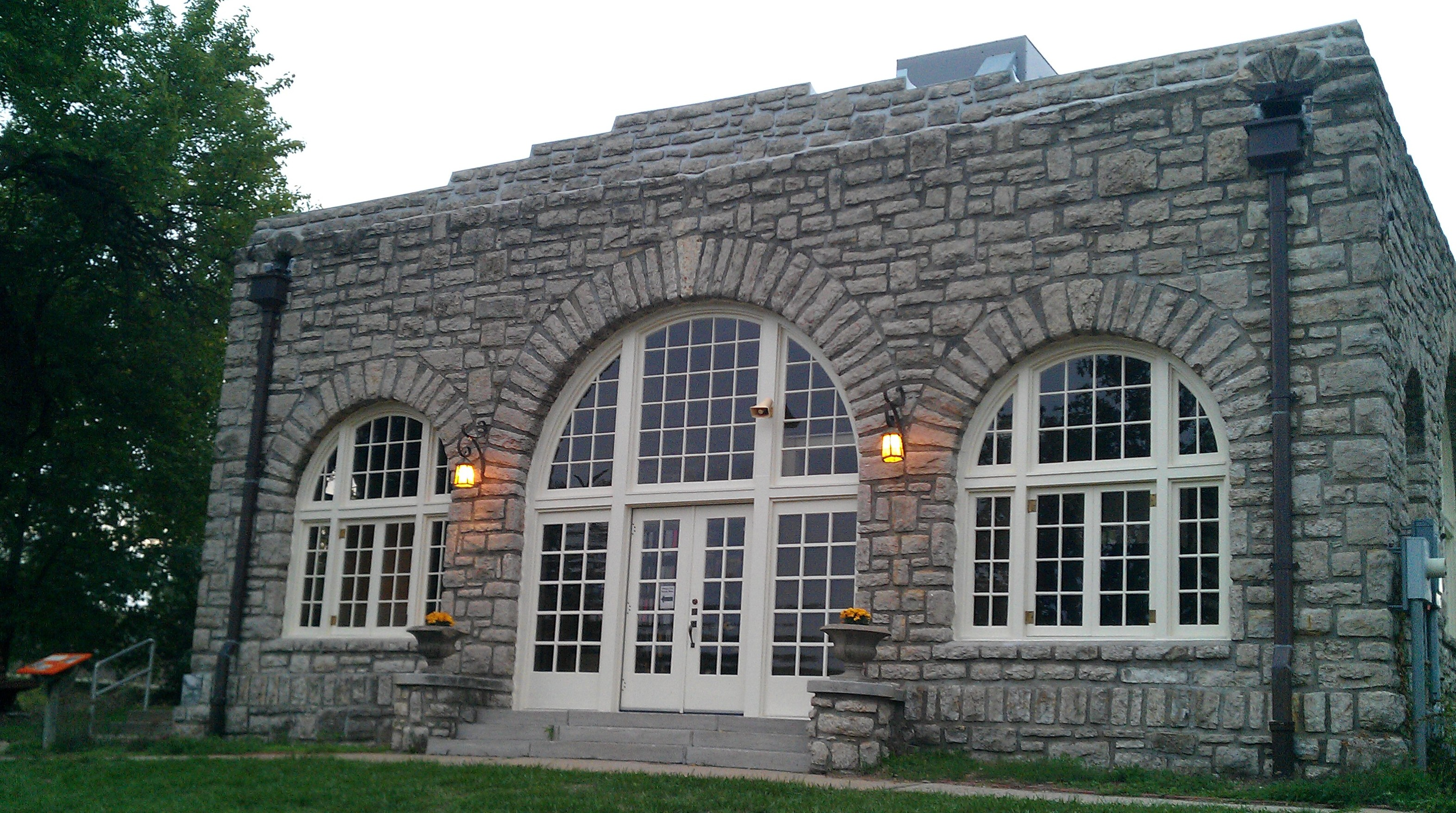

- Location within Kansas Location within the United States
- Location: John Brown Memorial Park, Osawatomie, Kansas
- Coordinates: 38°29′56″N 94°57′34″W
- Area: less than one acre
- Built: 1855; 171 years ago
- NRHP reference No.: 71000319
- Added to NRHP: March 24, 1971

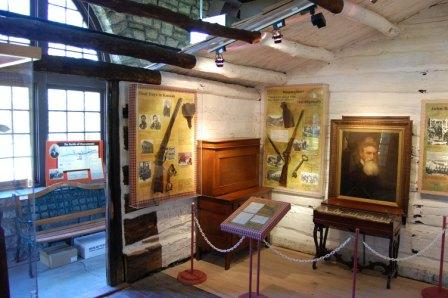
Interior

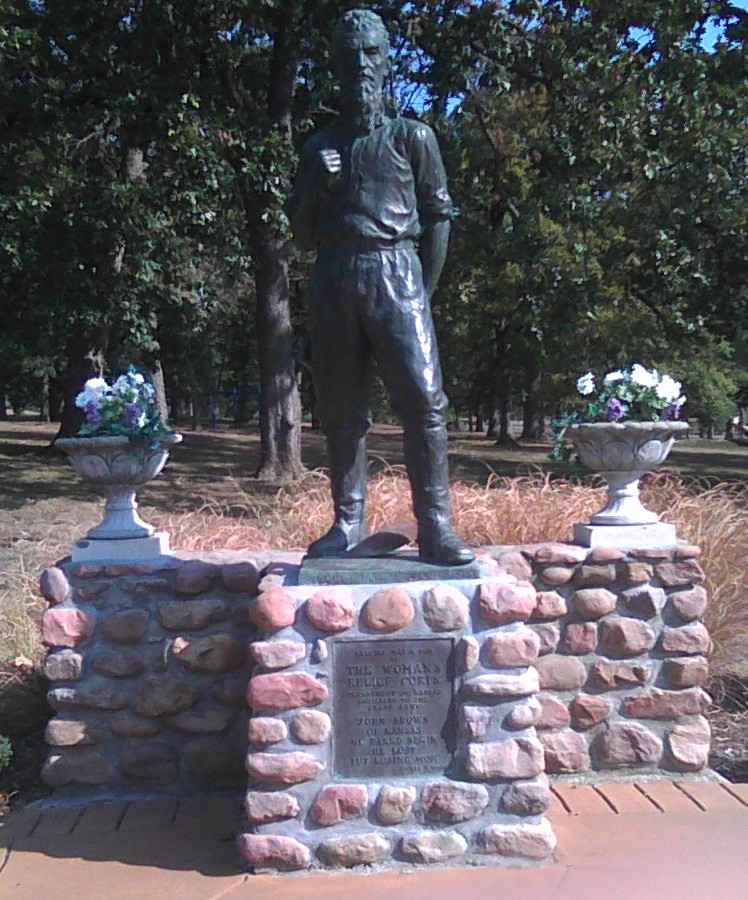
Statue of John Brown

The John Brown Museum, also known as the John Brown Museum State Historic Site and John Brown Cabin, is located in Osawatomie, Kansas. The site is operated by the Kansas Historical Society, and includes the log cabin of Reverend Samuel Adair and his wife, Florella, who was the half-sister of the abolitionist John Brown. Brown lived in the cabin during the twenty months he spent in Kansas and conducted many of his abolitionist activities from there. The museum's displays tell the story of John Brown, the Adairs and local abolitionists, and include the original cabin, Adair family furnishings and belongings, and Civil War artifacts.

== History ==
When Kansas Territory was established in 1854, newspapers in the North encouraged settlement in the area to ensure that the new state would be free. The land also offered promise to families—the opportunity to cultivate fertile land, enjoy the peaceful countryside, and protect the territory from the spread of slavery.

Samuel and Florella Brown Adair held such a dream. Florella's father, Owen Brown, was also the father of the abolitionist John Brown. Owen, a strict Calvinist, was a trustee at Oberlin College. John Brown's mother, Ruth Mills Brown, died in 1808, and Owen married Sally Root around 1811. Their children included Florella.

Both Samuel and Florella were graduates of Oberlin, a progressive coeducational and biracial college in Ohio. Samuel finished his theology program and the two were married and moved westward, where Samuel sought a position in Osawatomie, Kansas Territory.

Five of John Brown's sons followed the Adairs to Kansas. There they faced severe illness and the strife of Bleeding Kansas. Brown arrived to help his sons, but did not plan on staying permanently. In Kansas he found a sympathetic group to put his ideas into action. The abolitionists rebelled against the controlling pro-slavery government. They often fought those from Missouri who came into the territory to push pro-slavery agendas. Osawatomie, near the Missouri border, was attacked and burned by pro-slavery forces on August 30, 1856. The Adair Cabin, which the family had purchased in 1854 for US$200 (equivalent to about $7,200 in 2025), survived the attack.

The Adairs endured much hardship in the territory. As a minister, the Reverend Adair struggled to build his church, the first in Osawatomie and the third Congregational church in Kansas. He provided the walnut lumber and native stone construction materials used for the church building, which was dedicated July 14, 1861. The church still stands today.

Florella also led a hard, strenuous life. The log cabin required a dramatic change in lifestyle for the college-educated woman, who had to learn how to do without things to which she was accustomed.

During the American Civil War, Samuel was sent to Fort Leavenworth to serve as a military chaplain. Florella took over her husband's duties at home. Eventually she became ill and joined Samuel in Leavenworth, where she died in 1865.

After Florella's death, Samuel returned to Osawatomie. He helped establish the first mental institution in Kansas, which became Osawatomie State Hospital. There he volunteered his services as chaplain for 11 years. Samuel died in 1898. He left the cabin to his son, Charles Storrs Adair.

== Adair cabin ==
The Adairs' house was a typical rough, frontier log cabin. Its fireplace was used for warmth and cooking. It is believed that the room in back was used to hide escaped slaves. John Brown's son, Frederick, died nearby, the first victim of the Battle of Osawatomie. Because of his activities in and around the area, John Brown became known as "Old Osawatomie Brown". Brown stayed in the cabin with the Adairs from time to time. In 1911 the Kansas legislature named the site of the battleground John Brown Memorial Park and moved the cabin to its present site. The stone building that encloses the cabin was built in 1928. In 1963, the Kansas Historical Society became the administrator of the site.

== Statue ==
A statue of Brown by George Fite Waters was added in 1935. It was sponsored by the Women's Relief Corps, Department of Kansas.

== See also ==
- John Brown Farm State Historic Site, in upstate New York, a U.S. National Historic Landmark
- John Brown Farm, Tannery & Museum, in Pennsylvania
