= Osawatomie, Kansas =

- City
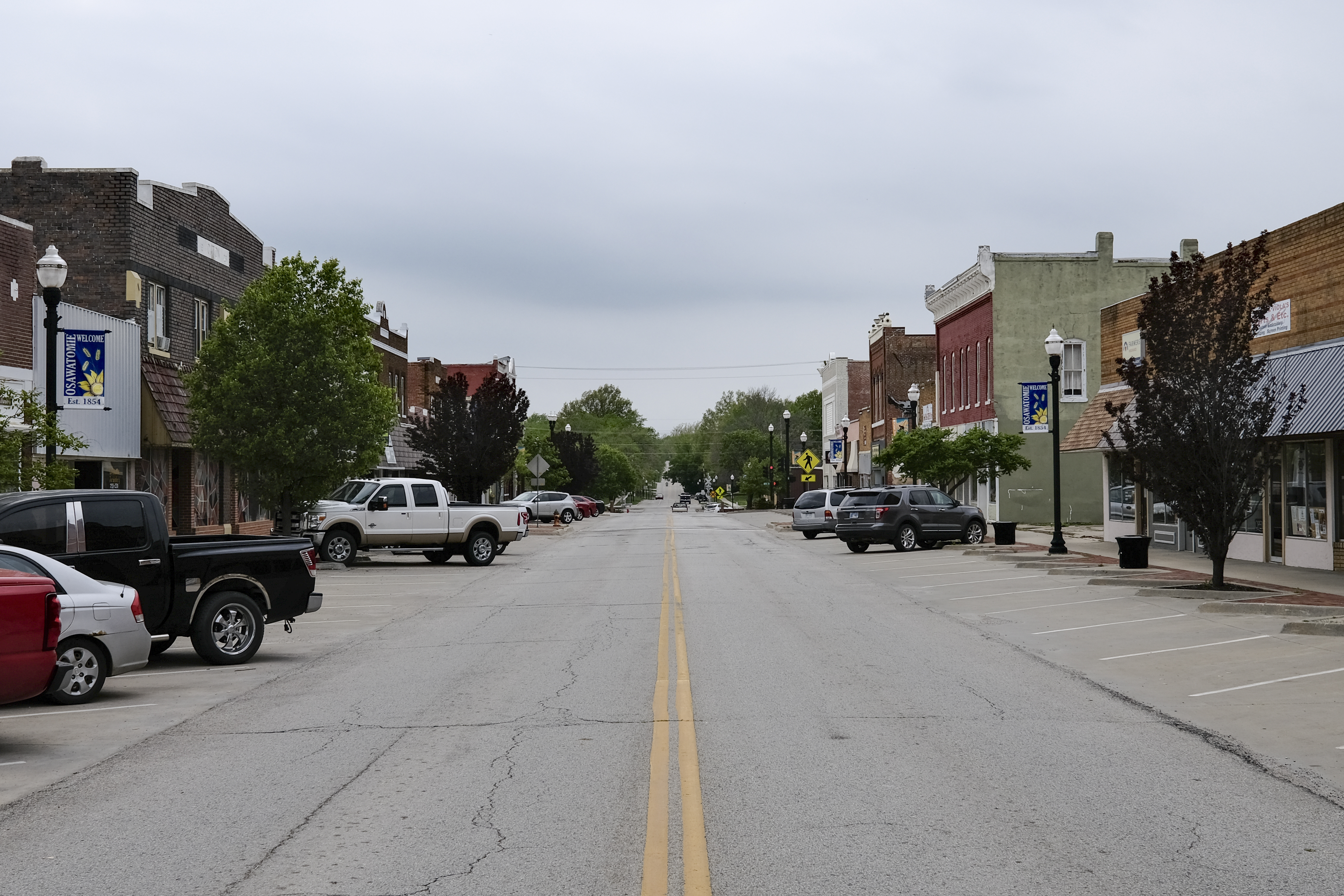
- Downtown (2022)

- Location within Miami County and Kansas

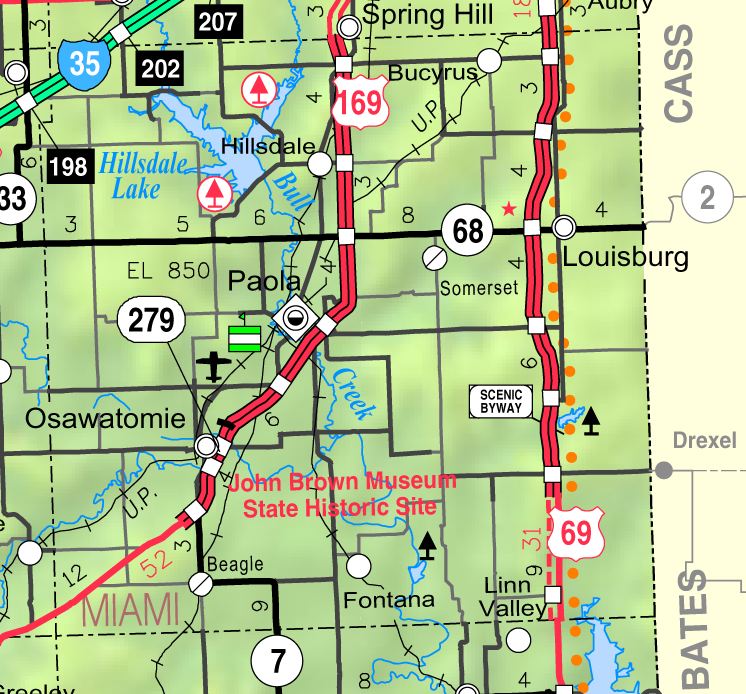
- KDOT map of Miami County (legend)
- Coordinates: 38°30′31″N 94°56′12″W
- Country: United States
- State: Kansas
- County: Miami
- Founded: 1854
- Incorporated: 1883

Government
  - Type: Mayor–Council
  - Mayor: Nick Hampson
  - City Manager: Bret Glendening

Area
  - Total: 5.34 sq mi (13.84 km^{2})
  - Land: 5.25 sq mi (13.60 km^{2})
  - Water: 0.093 sq mi (0.24 km^{2})
- Elevation: 889 ft (271 m)

Population (2020)
  - Total: 4,255
  - Density: 810.3/sq mi (312.9/km^{2})
- Time zone: UTC-6 (CST)
  - Summer (DST): UTC-5 (CDT)
- ZIP Code: 66064
- Area code: 913
- FIPS code: 20-53225
- GNIS ID: 485635
- Website: osawatomieks.org

Osawatomie (/oʊsəˈwɑːtəmi/ oh-sə-WAH-tə-mee) is a city in Miami County, Kansas, United States, 61 miles (98 km) southwest of Kansas City. As of the 2020 census, the population of the city was 4,255. It derives its name as a portmanteau of two nearby streams, the Marais des Cygnes River (formerly named "Osage River") and Pottawatomie Creek.

== History ==
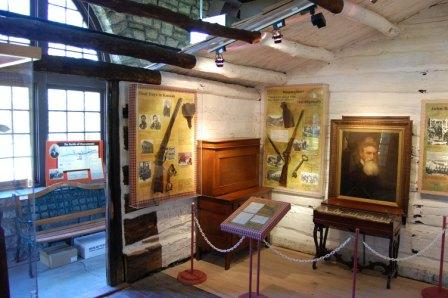
John Brown Museum (2008)

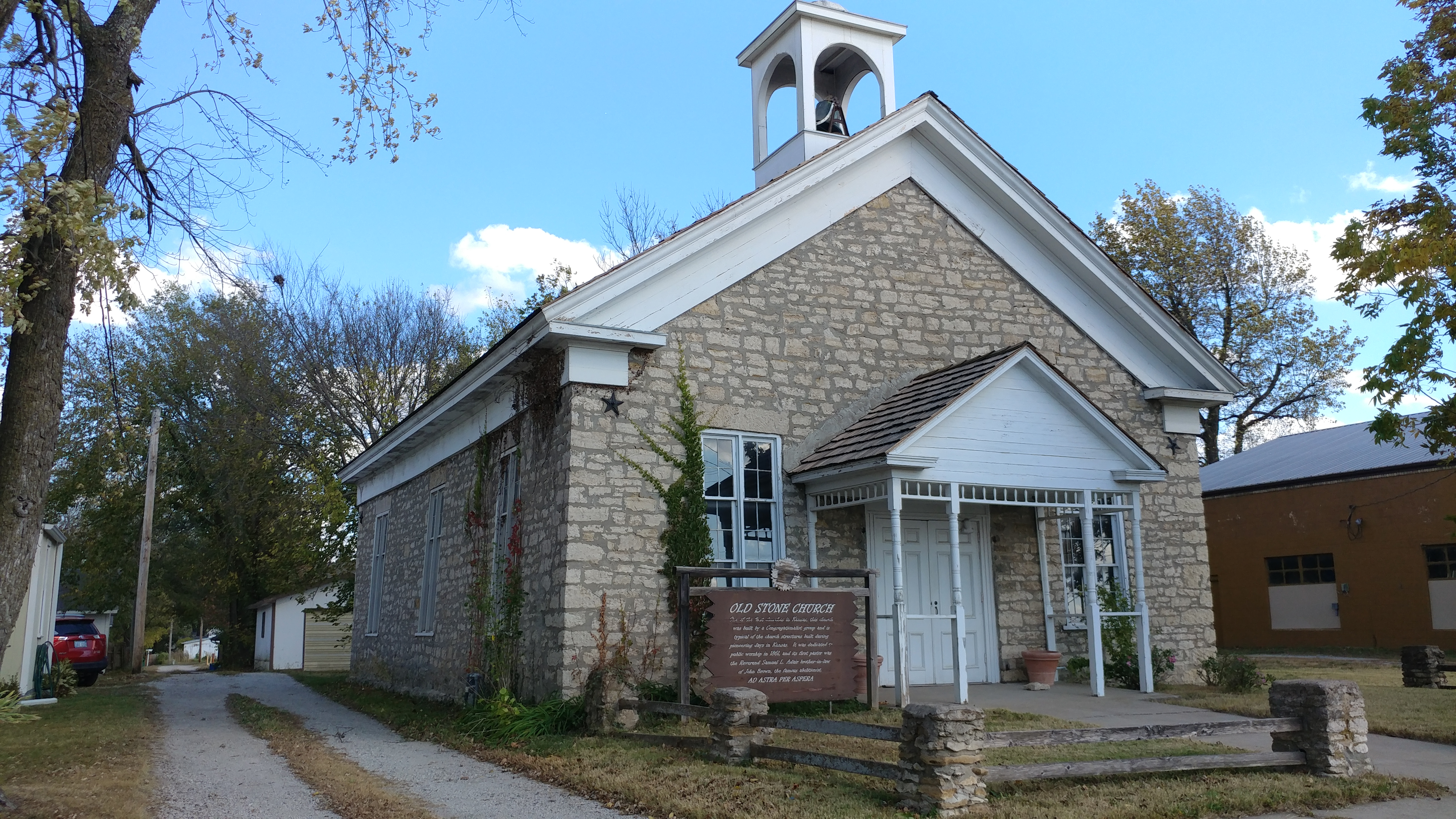
Historic Old Stone Church in Osawatomie (2020)

Osawatomie's name is a compound of two primary Native American tribes from the area, the Osage and Pottawatomie. The name was said to have been thought up by Ely Moore, an Indian agent and former Congressman, in order to settle a dispute on what to call the new settlement. The Pottawatomi had occupied large parts of Wisconsin and Michigan, but in 1838 they marched the Potawatomi Trail of Death and eventually arrived at Pottawattomie Creek, one edge of the modern-day location of Osawatomie, which had been provided to them by treaty. The small tribe did not stay long in Osawatomie and was eventually broken up. The other edge of the town is the Marais des Cygnes River, part of the Osage River system.

The Emigrant Aid Society's transport of settlers to the Kansas Territory as a base for Free State settlers was key in the establishment of the community of Osawatomie in October 1854. Settled by abolitionists in hope of aiding Kansas's entry to the United States as a free state, the community of Osawatomie and other abolitionist communities nearby were quickly the targets of violence by pro-enslavement forces such as Border Ruffians.

In March 1855, abolitionists Reverend Samuel Adair and his wife Florella settled in a cabin near Osawatomie to serve as missionaries to the community. Florella's half-brother, John Brown came to Bleeding Kansas later the same year with a wagon of guns in order to help fight the pro slavery forces like his five sons, who were already living in another community in the area. Brown then came to Osawatomie to visit the Adairs and fight pro-slavery forces there. By 1856, having established himself as a leader of free state guerillas, Brown made Osawatomie and the Adair cabin his base. In a raid in May 1856, Brown killed five pro-slavery men along Pottawatomie Creek near the current town of Lane, Kansas. This was then referred to as the "Pottawatomie massacre", which inflamed the fighting throughout the Kansas Territory. The second and main Battle of Osawatomie took place on August 30, 1856. Osawatomie played a key role throughout the Civil War, serving as a center for Jayhawker activity.

By 1857, Osawatomie had grown to a town of 800 and in 1859 hosted the first convention of the Kansas Republican Party. In recognition for Osawatomie's part in ensuring Kansas remained a free state, the Kansas Legislature established the Osawatomie State Mental Hospital in 1863, the first mental hospital west of the Mississippi River. It admitted its first patient in 1866, and is still operational. By 1879, a railroad was built to serve Osawatomie, aiding its growth into a supply town and a main shipping point. As a result, Osawatomie grew to a population of 4,046 by 1910. Osawatomie was a division point for the Missouri Pacific Railroad and the Union Pacific Railroad from 1879 to 1985.

Osawatomie was chartered in 1883 and in 1890 became a second-class city. The commission form of government was adopted in 1914.

=== Battle of Osawatomie ===
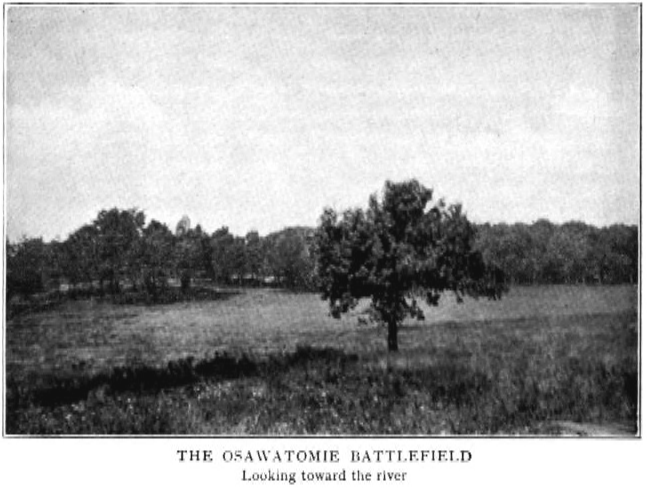
Osawatomie Battlefield (1910)

The first skirmish in Osawatomie took place on June 7, 1856. However, there was not much of a fight, and no blood was shed. The town's buildings were plundered, and some horses were taken. The larger, and main conflict known as the Battle of Osawatomie began August 30, 1856 as John Brown was camped just north Osawatomie and looking east for pro-slavery forces. A pro-slavery force of 250, led by John William Reid, came riding into Osawatomie from another direction. One of John Brown's sons Frederick Brown was walking to the Adair cabin at the time, and was shot. When Reverend Adair heard the shot, he sent his own son to warn and notify John Brown of the raid. Brown and 31 of the free state guerillas took positions to attempt to defend Osawatomie. Heavy gunfire took place for over 45 minutes, until Brown and his men ran out of ammunition. They retreated hoping they would be chased, and the community of Osawatomie would be left alone. However, despite the attempts of Brown to get Reid's men to follow, they instead looted and burned Osawatomie. Only three buildings remained standing when it was over.

=== Presidential visits ===
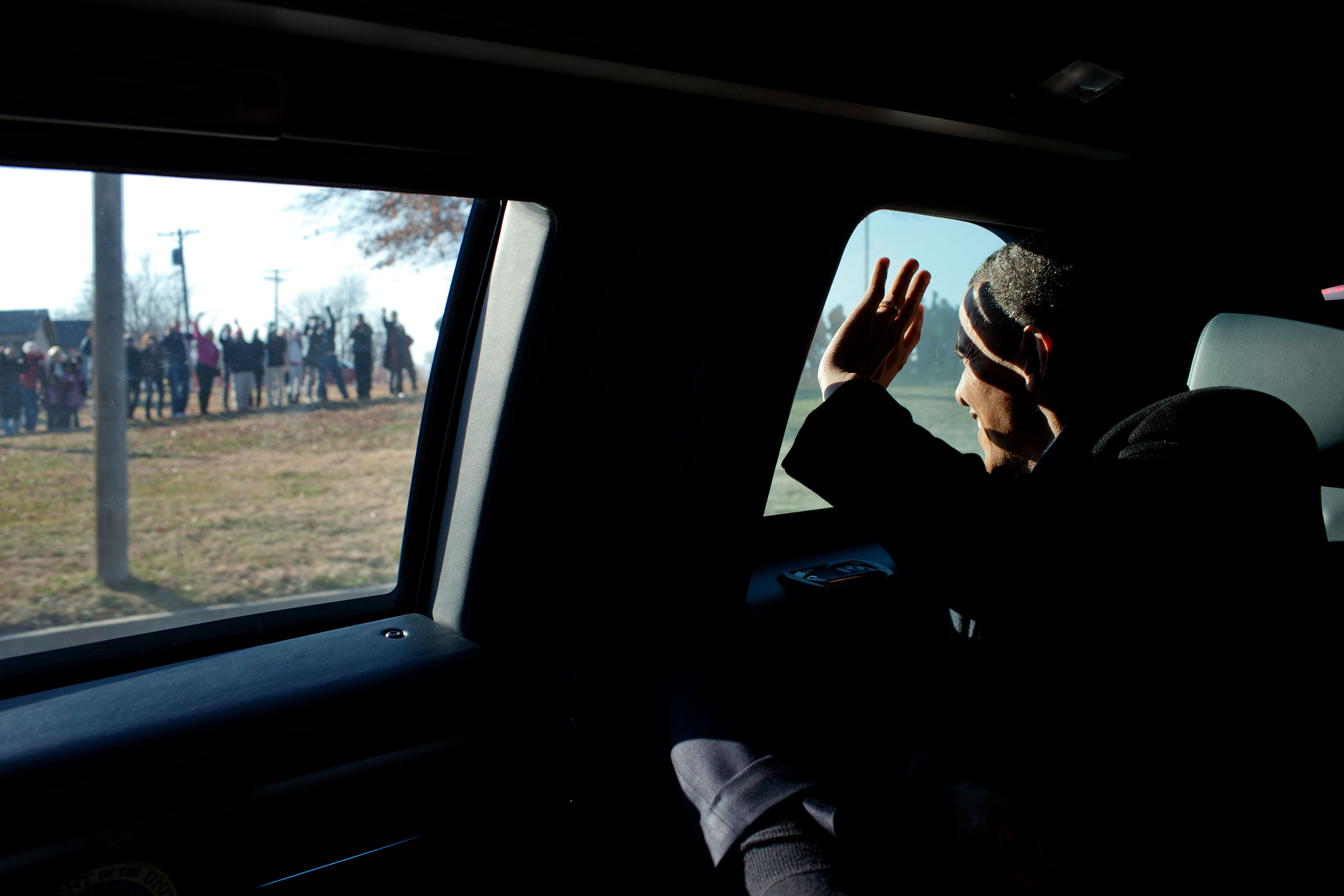
President Obama waved to Kansans after his economic speech in Osawatomie on December 6, 2011.

On August 31, 1910, President Theodore Roosevelt gave his famous New Nationalism speech in Osawatomie. The central issue he argued was government protection of human welfare and property rights.

On December 6, 2011, President Barack Obama gave an economic speech reprising many of Roosevelt's themes at Osawatomie High School.

== Geography ==
Osawatomie is located in southwestern Miami County along US Route 169 and Kansas Highway 7. The Marais des Cygnes River flows past the north side of the community and Pottawatomie Creek flows past the south side.

According to the United States Census Bureau, the city has a total area of 5.11 square miles (13.23 km^{2}), of which 5.00 square miles (12.95 km^{2}) is land and 0.11 square miles (0.28 km^{2}) is water.

=== Climate ===
The climate in this area is characterized by hot, humid summers and generally mild to cool dry winters. According to the Köppen Climate Classification system, Osawatomie has a humid subtropical climate, abbreviated "Cfa" on climate maps.

Climate data for Osawatomie, Kansas (1991–2020)
Month	Jan	Feb	Mar	Apr	May	Jun	Jul	Aug	Sep	Oct	Nov	Dec	Year
Mean daily maximum °F (°C)	39.8 (4.3)	45.3 (7.4)	55.9 (13.3)	65.6 (18.7)	74.8 (23.8)	84.1 (28.9)	89.2 (31.8)	88.2 (31.2)	80.3 (26.8)	68.8 (20.4)	55.0 (12.8)	44.0 (6.7)	65.9 (18.8)
Daily mean °F (°C)	29.3 (−1.5)	34.0 (1.1)	44.3 (6.8)	54.1 (12.3)	64.5 (18.1)	74.1 (23.4)	78.8 (26.0)	77.2 (25.1)	68.7 (20.4)	56.9 (13.8)	44.0 (6.7)	33.8 (1.0)	55.0 (12.8)
Mean daily minimum °F (°C)	18.8 (−7.3)	22.6 (−5.2)	32.7 (0.4)	42.6 (5.9)	54.2 (12.3)	64.2 (17.9)	68.3 (20.2)	66.2 (19.0)	57.1 (13.9)	44.9 (7.2)	33.0 (0.6)	23.5 (−4.7)	44.0 (6.7)
Average precipitation inches (mm)	1.14 (29)	1.63 (41)	2.59 (66)	3.75 (95)	5.51 (140)	5.49 (139)	4.19 (106)	3.37 (86)	4.15 (105)	3.09 (78)	2.33 (59)	1.65 (42)	38.89 (986)
Average snowfall inches (cm)	2.9 (7.4)	2.3 (5.8)	0.5 (1.3)	0.0 (0.0)	0.0 (0.0)	0.0 (0.0)	0.0 (0.0)	0.0 (0.0)	0.0 (0.0)	0.2 (0.51)	0.1 (0.25)	2.4 (6.1)	8.4 (21.36)
Source: NOAA

== Demographics ==
Historical population
Census	Pop.	Note	%±
1880	681		—
1890	2,662		290.9%
1900	4,191		57.4%
1910	2,568		−38.7%
1920	3,293		28.2%
1930	4,440		34.8%
1940	4,145		−6.6%
1950	4,347		4.9%
1960	4,622		6.3%
1970	4,294		−7.1%
1980	4,459		3.8%
1990	4,590		2.9%
2000	4,645		1.2%
2010	4,447		−4.3%
2020	4,255		−4.3%
U.S. Decennial Census

Osawatomie is part of the Kansas City metropolitan area.

=== 2020 census ===
As of the 2020 census, Osawatomie had 4,255 people, 1,562 households, and 1,023 families. The median age was 36.1 years. 27.0% of residents were under the age of 18, 9.0% were from 18 to 24, 25.4% were from 25 to 44, 25.1% were from 45 to 64, and 13.5% were 65 years of age or older. For every 100 females, there were 93.9 males, and for every 100 females age 18 and over, there were 92.0 males age 18 and over. 0.0% of residents lived in urban areas, while 100.0% lived in rural areas.

The population density was 810.2 per square mile (312.8/km^{2}). There were 1,799 housing units at an average density of 342.5 per square mile (132.3/km^{2}). Of the housing units, 13.2% were vacant; the homeowner vacancy rate was 3.8%, and the rental vacancy rate was 12.3%.

Of all households, 35.6% had children under the age of 18 living in them, 39.2% were married-couple households, 20.8% were households with a male householder and no spouse or partner present, and 30.2% were households with a female householder and no spouse or partner present. About 28.6% of households were made up of individuals, and 12.8% had someone living alone who was 65 years of age or older.

Racial composition as of the 2020 census
Race	Number	Percent
White	3,718	87.4%
Black or African American	137	3.2%
American Indian and Alaska Native	43	1.0%
Asian	15	0.4%
Native Hawaiian and Other Pacific Islander	4	0.1%
Some other race	38	0.9%
Two or more races	300	7.1%
Hispanic or Latino (of any race)	182	4.3%

=== Demographic estimates ===
The average household size was 2.4 and the average family size was 3.1. The percent of those with a bachelor's degree or higher was estimated to be 10.7% of the population.

=== Income and poverty ===
The 2016–2020 5-year American Community Survey estimates show that the median household income was $51,307 (with a margin of error of +/- $16,869) and the median family income was $60,739 (+/- $9,457). Males had a median income of $37,192 (+/- $7,732) versus $26,556 (+/- $3,356) for females. The median income for those above 16 years old was $31,701 (+/- $2,634). Approximately, 16.8% of families and 19.3% of the population were below the poverty line, including 27.0% of those under the age of 18 and 25.0% of those ages 65 or over.

=== 2010 census ===
As of the census of 2010, there were 4,447 people, 1,644 households, and 1,075 families residing in the city. The population density was 889.4 inhabitants per square mile (343.4/km^{2}). There were 1,891 housing units at an average density of 378.2 per square mile (146.0/km^{2}). The racial makeup of the city was 92.3% White, 3.1% African American, 1.0% Native American, 0.3% Asian, 0.9% from other races, and 2.4% from two or more races. Hispanic or Latino of any race were 2.9% of the population.

There were 1,644 households, of which 39.1% had children under the age of 18 living with them, 42.9% were married couples living together, 16.2% had a female householder with no husband present, 6.2% had a male householder with no wife present, and 34.6% were non-families. 29.7% of all households were made up of individuals, and 12.9% had someone living alone who was 65 years of age or older. The average household size was 2.53 and the average family size was 3.09.

The median age in the city was 34.6 years. 28.6% of residents were under the age of 18; 8.5% were between the ages of 18 and 24; 25.9% were from 25 to 44; 24% were from 45 to 64; and 13% were 65 years of age or older. The gender makeup of the city was 48.0% male and 52.0% female.

== Historical places ==
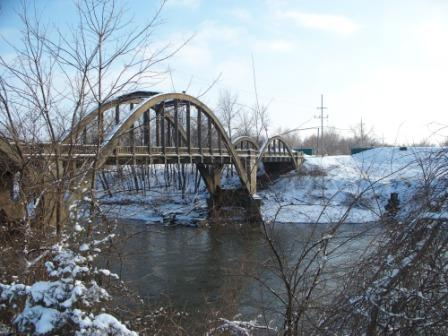
Historic Creamery Bridge (2007)

Osawatomie has several historical places, five of which are listed on the National Historic Register:

- The Mills House - A 7,000 sq ft (650 m^{2}). Queen-Anne style home built in 1902 for William Mills.
- Asylum Bridge - An unusual bridge built in 1905 connecting the community to the state mental hospital.
- Creamery Bridge - In 1930, this bridge was built crossing the Marais des Cygnes River. A duplicate bridge crosses the Pottawatomie Creek. Osawatomie is between the two. Both bridges are on the National Historic Register.
- John Brown Museum State Historic Site: The site of the Battle of Osawatomie is contained in the John Brown Memorial Park. Also, the Adair Cabin is exhibited there.
- John Brown Lookout - Located north of 319th and Lookout Road, this high point in the county was used as a Civil War lookout. There is now a ladder there that can be used to cross the fence line for access to the lookout. An exhibit at John Brown State Historic site also features John Brown Lookout.

Other historic places in or around Osawatomie include:

- Midway Drive-In Theater - Located off of Old KC Road between Paola and Osawatomie is a drive-in theater, one of only twelve remaining in the state. This outdoor movie theater is still operational and shows movies, which used to be called "talkies", during the spring and summer months.
- Flood Marker - A historic flood of the Marais des Cygnes River occurred in 1951. A marker was placed north of 343rd and one-half mile east of Columbia Road to show the height of the water, 50.3 feet, which has yet to be matched.

== Community ==
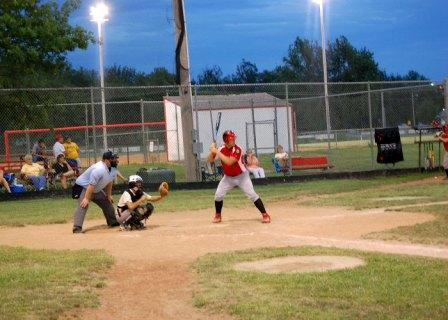
Baseball at sports complex (2008)

The community of Osawatomie offers a museum and driving tour for learning of its history, and also offers its residents various opportunities for recreation. There is an 18-hole golf course, and the Osawatomie City Lake for fishing. The USD 367 Sport and Fitness Zone (O-Zone) is also in Osawatomie, which has two indoor pools, an outdoor pool, a gymnasium, weight room, indoor track, and offers programs for all ages. The Karl E. Cole Sports Complex in Osawatomie is used for athletic events such as baseball, softball, soccer, and youth football.

Osawatomie hosts the John Brown Jamboree, an annual arts, crafts, and music festival each summer. Each October, the Talking Tombstones event is held at Oakwood Cemetery, with reenactments of historical figures buried there, to remember their lives and contribution to the community's history.

== Film ==
On March 13, 2010, the short film Change for a Dollar was filmed in Osawatomie.

== Government ==
The Osawatomie government consists of a mayor and eight council members.

== Education ==
The community is served by Osawatomie USD 367 public school district.

Its four schools are:

- Swenson Early Childhood Education Center (Pre-K and K)
- Trojan Elementary (grades 1-5)
- Osawatomie Middle School (grades 6-8)
- Osawatomie High School (grades 9-12)

== Notable people ==
- B. H. Born - All American Basketball player
- John Brown resided for 20 months in a cabin, now the John Brown Museum
- Lynn Dickey - NFL quarterback for fifteen seasons, chiefly with Green Bay Packers
- Derrick Jensen - pro football player
- Mo Brings Plenty - Native American activist and actor, notably from Yellowstone tv series
- Lafayette Russell - pro football player and actor
- Bryan Sperry - football player and coach
