= Marais des Cygnes River =

River in Kansas and Missouri in the United States

Marais des Cygnes River Big Osage River, Brush Creek, Grand River, Old Aunt Mary River
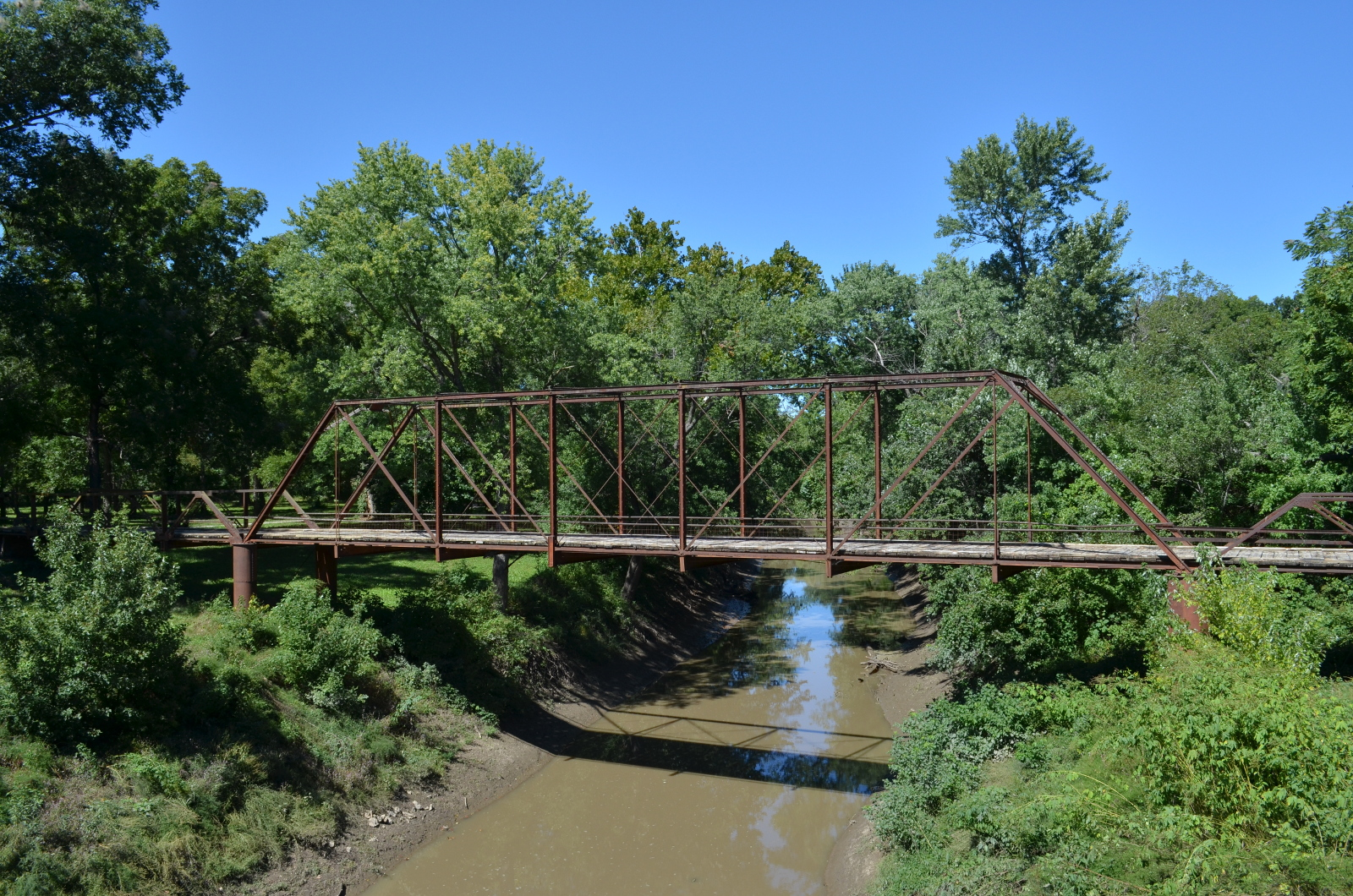

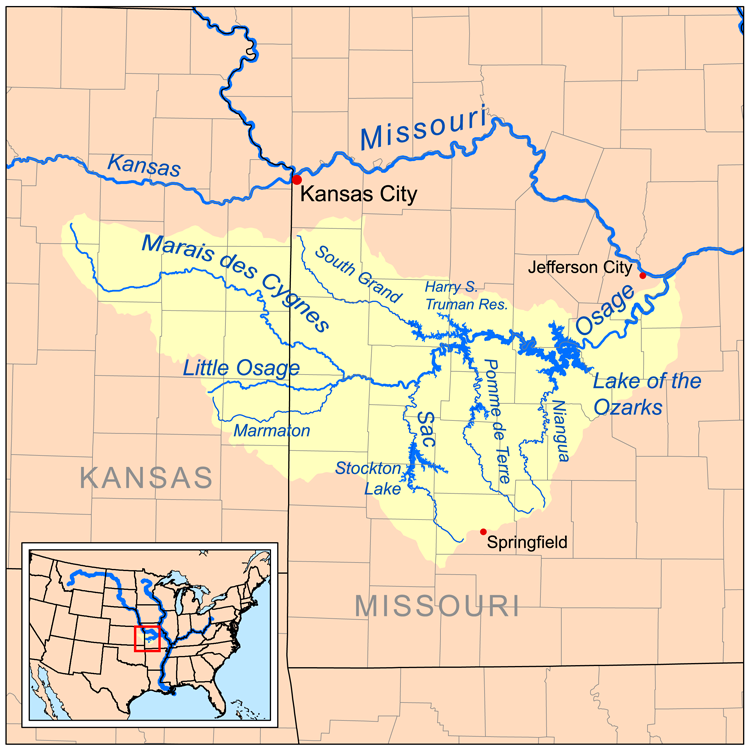
- Map of the Osage River watershed including the Marais des Cygnes River

Location
- Country: United States
- State: Kansas, Missouri

Physical characteristics
- Source confluence
  - location: Lyon County, Kansas
  - coordinates: 38°34′05″N 95°58′28″W
  - elevation: 1,112 ft (339 m)
- Mouth: Osage River
  - location: Vernon County, Missouri
  - coordinates: 38°01′39″N 94°14′39″W
  - elevation: 722 ft (220 m)
- Length: 217 mi (349 km)
- Discharge
  - location: USGS 06916600 near Kansas-Missouri state line
  - average: 2,189 cu ft/s (62.0 m^{3}/s)
  - minimum: 0 cu ft/s (0 m^{3}/s)
  - maximum: 129,000 cu ft/s (3,700 m^{3}/s)

Basin features
- Tributaries
  - left: 110 Mile Creek, Bull Creek
  - right: Pottawatomie Creek
- Watersheds: Marais des Cygnes-Osage-Missouri-Mississippi

The Marais des Cygnes River (/ˌmɛər də ˈziːn, - ˈsiːn, ˈmɛər də ziːn/ MAIR de ZEEN, - zeen, - SEEN, French: [maʁɛ de siɲ]) is a principal tributary of the Osage River, about 217 miles (349 km) long, in eastern Kansas and western Missouri in the United States. Via the Osage and Missouri rivers, it is part of the watershed of the Mississippi River.

The name Marais des Cygnes means "Marsh of the Swans" in French (presumably in reference to the trumpeter swan, which was historically common in the Midwest).

The river is notorious for flash flooding. It is referred to in the song "The River" by Chely Wright. La Cygne, Kansas, in Linn County and Osawatomie, Kansas, in Miami County are gravely affected by its flooding.

== Course ==
The Marais des Cygnes is formed about 1 mile north of Reading, Kansas, a city in northern Lyon County, by the confluence of Elm Creek and One Hundred Forty-Two Mile Creek, and flows generally east-southeastwardly through Osage, Franklin, Miami and Linn counties in Kansas, and Bates County in Missouri, past the Kansas towns of Melvern, Quenemo, Ottawa, Osawatomie and La Cygne and through the Marais des Cygnes National Wildlife Refuge. In Missouri, it joins the Little Osage River at the boundary of Bates and Vernon counties to form the Osage River, 6 miles (10 km) west of Schell City.

In Osage County, Kansas, a U.S. Army Corps of Engineers dam causes the river to form Melvern Lake, which is the site of Eisenhower State Park.

== Floods ==
The Marais des Cygnes River has a history of flooding. One of the first such floods that has been noted is the Great Flood of 1844 known as "Big Water" in Native American legend. Though no measurements were taken, it is estimated to have crested at 40 feet (12 m).

Some of the more notable floods after 1844 include the 1909 flood, cresting at 36.3 feet (11.1 m); the 1915 flood, cresting at 31 feet (9.4 m); the 1928 flood, cresting at 38.65 feet (11.78 m); the 1944 flood, cresting at 36.5 feet (11.1 m); the 1951 flood, cresting at 42.97 feet (13.10 m); and the 2007 flood, cresting at 36.07 feet (10.99 m).

The Great Flood of 1951 happened in June and July 1951, killing 28 people and causing over $935 million damage (in 1951 dollars). This flood also affected the Kansas, Neosho, and Verdigris river basins.

As a result of the 1951 flood, the U.S. Army Corps of Engineers built levees and flood control systems on the Marais des Cygnes in the 1960s, including massive freestanding gated floodwalls in Ottawa, Kansas. Main Street (Old U.S. Highway 59) in Ottawa has to be detoured or is simply closed down when the gates are shut.

== Variant names ==
The United States Board on Geographic Names settled on "Marais des Cygnes River" as the name in 1971. According to the Geographic Names Information System, the river has also been known as:

- Big Osage River
- Brush Creek
- Grand River
- Le Marais du Cygne River
- Marais Des Cygnes River
- Marias des Cygnes River
- Mary de Zene River
- Miry Disein River
- Old Aunt Mary River
- Osage River
- Riviere des Osages

== See also ==
- List of Kansas rivers
- List of Missouri rivers
- Battle of Marais des Cygnes
