= Eisenhower State Park (Kansas) =

State park in Kansas, United States

- Location within Kansas Location within the United States
- Interactive map of Eisenhower State Park
- Location: Osage County, Kansas, United States
- Coordinates: 38°31′13″N 95°44′56″W
- Area: 1,785 acres (722 ha)
- Elevation: 1,083 ft (330 m)
- Established: 1975
- Administrator: Kansas Department of Wildlife and Parks
- Visitors: 97,375 (in 2022)
- Named for: President Dwight D. Eisenhower
- Website: Official website
- Kansas State Parks

Eisenhower State Park is a state park in Osage County, Kansas, United States, located 30 miles (48 km) northeast of Emporia and 35 miles (56 km) south of Topeka.

The park was formerly known as Melvern State Park, due to its location on the north shore of the 6,900-acre (2,800 ha) Melvern Lake, was renamed in 1990 to honor former president Dwight D. Eisenhower. The park includes 1,345 acres (544 ha) of prairie, 440 acres (180 ha) of woodland, and various areas for recreational activities.

The 10,008-acre (4,050 ha) Melvern Wildlife Area adjacent to the park is home to a variety of wildlife, including white-tailed deer, eastern wild turkey, bobwhite quail, squirrels, various furbearers, and waterfowl. Hunting is allowed throughout the park except on the 1,000-acre (400 ha) waterfowl refuge, which is open to wildlife viewing from January 15 to October 1.

== See also ==
- List of lakes, reservoirs, and dams in Kansas
- List of rivers of Kansas
