= Kansas City Bridge Company =

Former American bridge-building company

The Kansas City Bridge Company was a bridge building company that built many bridges throughout the Midwest United States in the early 1900s. The company was founded in 1893 and ceased business around 1960.

A number of its works are listed on the U.S. National Register of Historic Places.

== Bridges ==
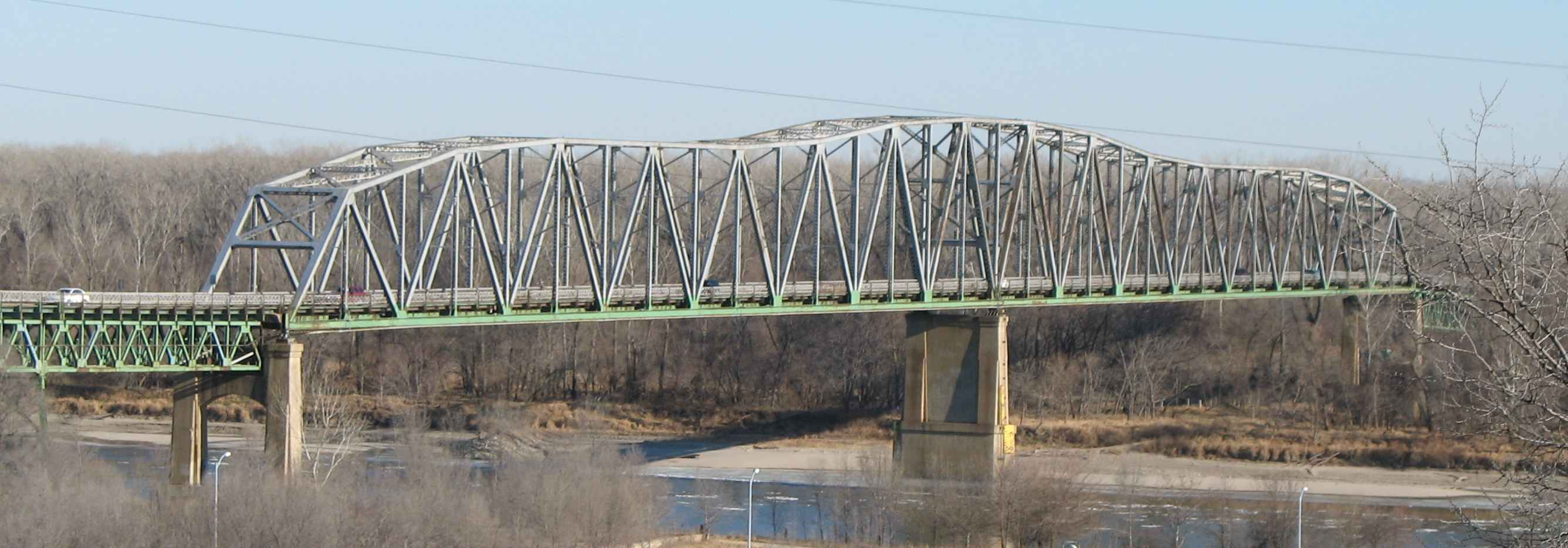
South Omaha Bridge, demolished

Missouri River

- Missouri-Kansas-Texas (MKT) Bridge
- Lexington Bridge (Lexington, Missouri)
- Fairfax Bridge
- Rulo Bridge
- Nebraska City Bridge — 1930 through truss Waubonsie Bridge.
- South Omaha Veterans Memorial Bridge
- Blair Bridge
- Asylum Bridge, First St. over Marais des Cygnes Osawatomie, KS (Kansas City Bridge Co.), NRHP-listed
- Bridgeport Hill-Hydro OK 66 Segment, OK 66 from Hydro E to Spur US 281 Hydro, OK (Kansas City Bridge Company), NRHP-listed
- Carey's Ford Bridge, Over Marais des Cygnes River, E of Osawatomie Osawatomie, KS (Kansas City Bridge Co.), NRHP-listed
- Little Deep Fork Creek Bridge, 0.33 mi. E of jct. of E0830 Rd. and N3700 Rd. Bristow, OK (Kansas City Bridge Co.), NRHP-listed
- Little Walnut River Pratt Truss Bridge, SW 160th Rd., 0.5 mi. W of int. with Purity Springs Rd. Bois D'Arc, KS (Kansas City Bridge & Iron Co.), NRHP-listed
- North Gypsum Creek Truss Leg Bedstead Bridge, Sioux Rd., 0.2 mi. E of int. with 24th Ave., 1.0 mi. S and 2.8 mi. W of Roxbury Roxbury, KS (Kansas City Bridge Co.), NRHP-listed
- Papinville Marais des Cygnes River Bridge, Cty. Rd. 648 over the Marais des Cygenes R. Papinville, MO (Kansas City Bridge and Iron Co.), NRHP-listed
- Salt Creek Truss Leg Bedstead Bridge, B Rd., 0.6 mi. E of int with 24th Rd., 1.0 mi. N of Barnard Barnard, KS (Kansas City Bridge Co.), NRHP-listed
- South Omaha Bridge, US 275/NE 92 over the Missouri R. Omaha, NE and Council Bluffs, IA (Kansas City Bridge Co.), NRHP-listed
- Tauy Creek Bridge, Over Tauy Cr. N of I-35 Ottawa, KS (Kansas City Bridge Co.), NRHP-listed

Mississippi River

- Huey P. Long Bridge at Baton Rouge, Louisiana.
