= Fairfax Bridge =

Fairfax Bridge may refer to:

- Fairfax Bridge (Missouri River) in Kansas and Missouri (demolished)
- Fairfax Bridge (Washington) over the Carbon River
