= North Gypsum Creek Truss Leg Bedstead Bridge =

- U.S. National Register of Historic Places
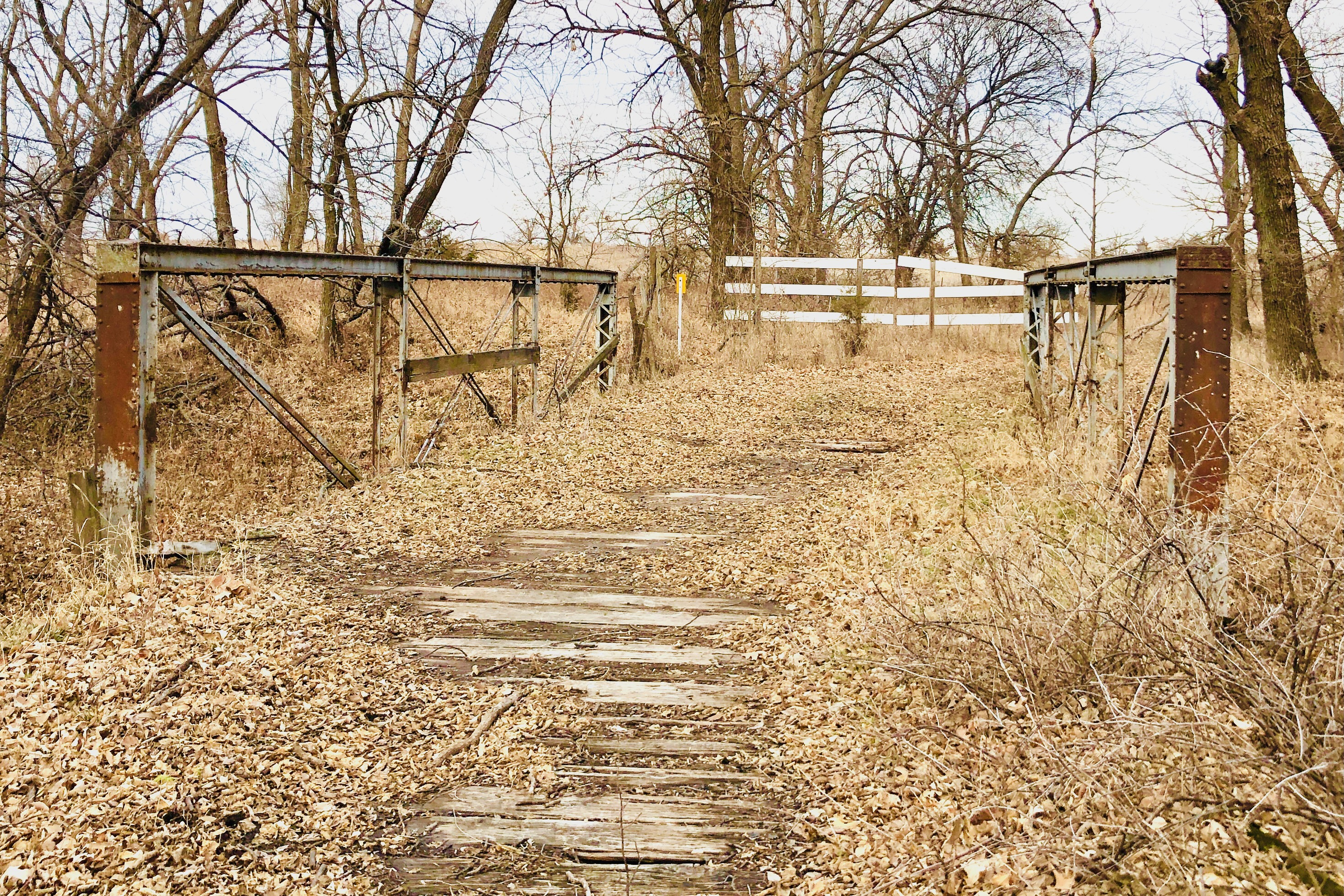
- North Gypsum Creek Truss Leg Bedstead Bridge

- Location within Kansas Location within the United States
- Nearest city: Roxbury, Kansas
- Coordinates: 38°32′12″N 97°28′39″W
- Built: c.1902
- Architect: Kansas City Bridge Co.
- MPS: Metal Truss Bridges in Kansas 1861--1939 MPS
- NRHP reference No.: 03000367
- Added to NRHP: May 9, 2003

North Gypsum Creek Truss Leg Bedstead Bridge (59-LT-22) is an historic bridge in McPherson County, Roxbury, Kansas.

The bridge was built in 1902 and added to the National Historic Register in 2003.

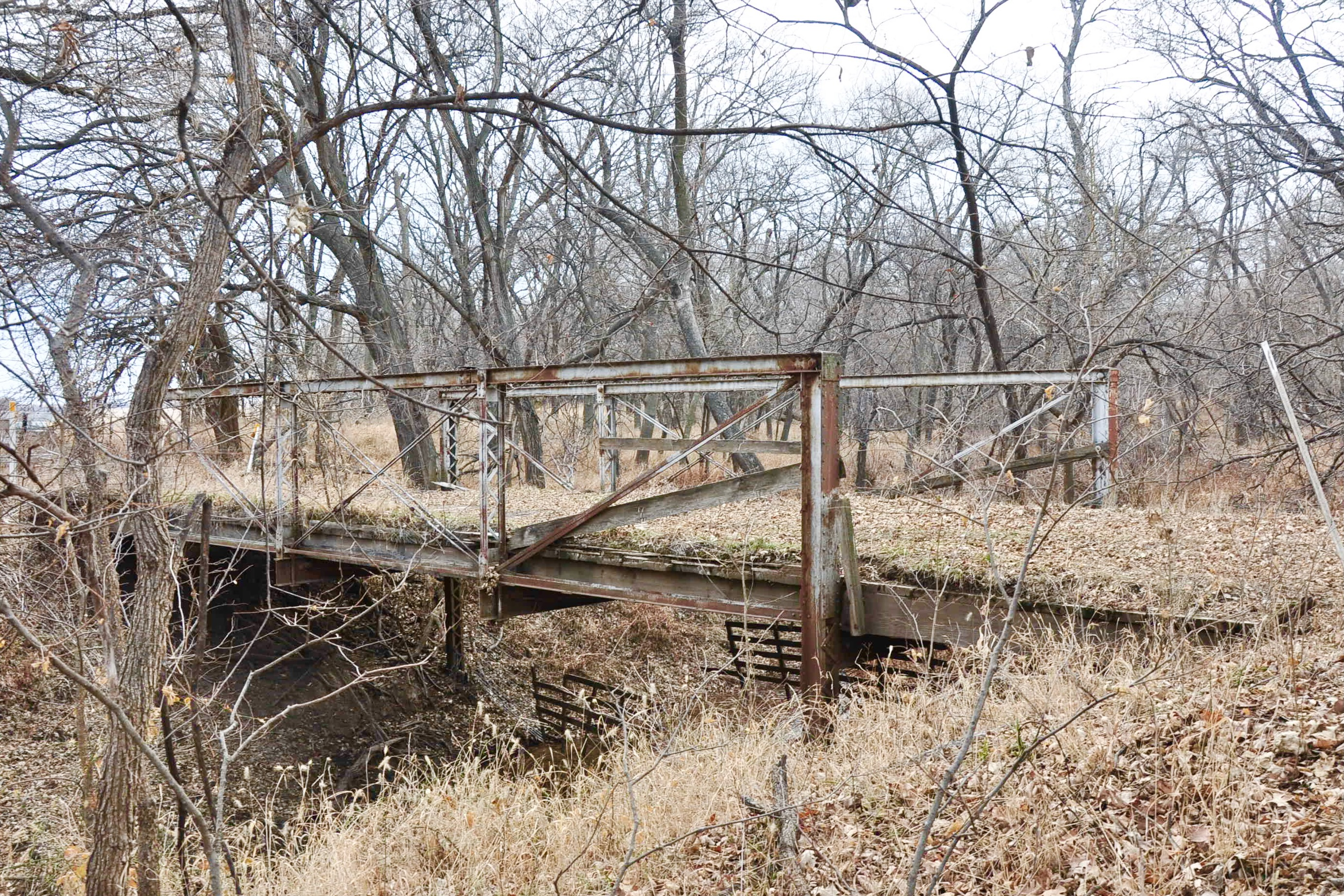

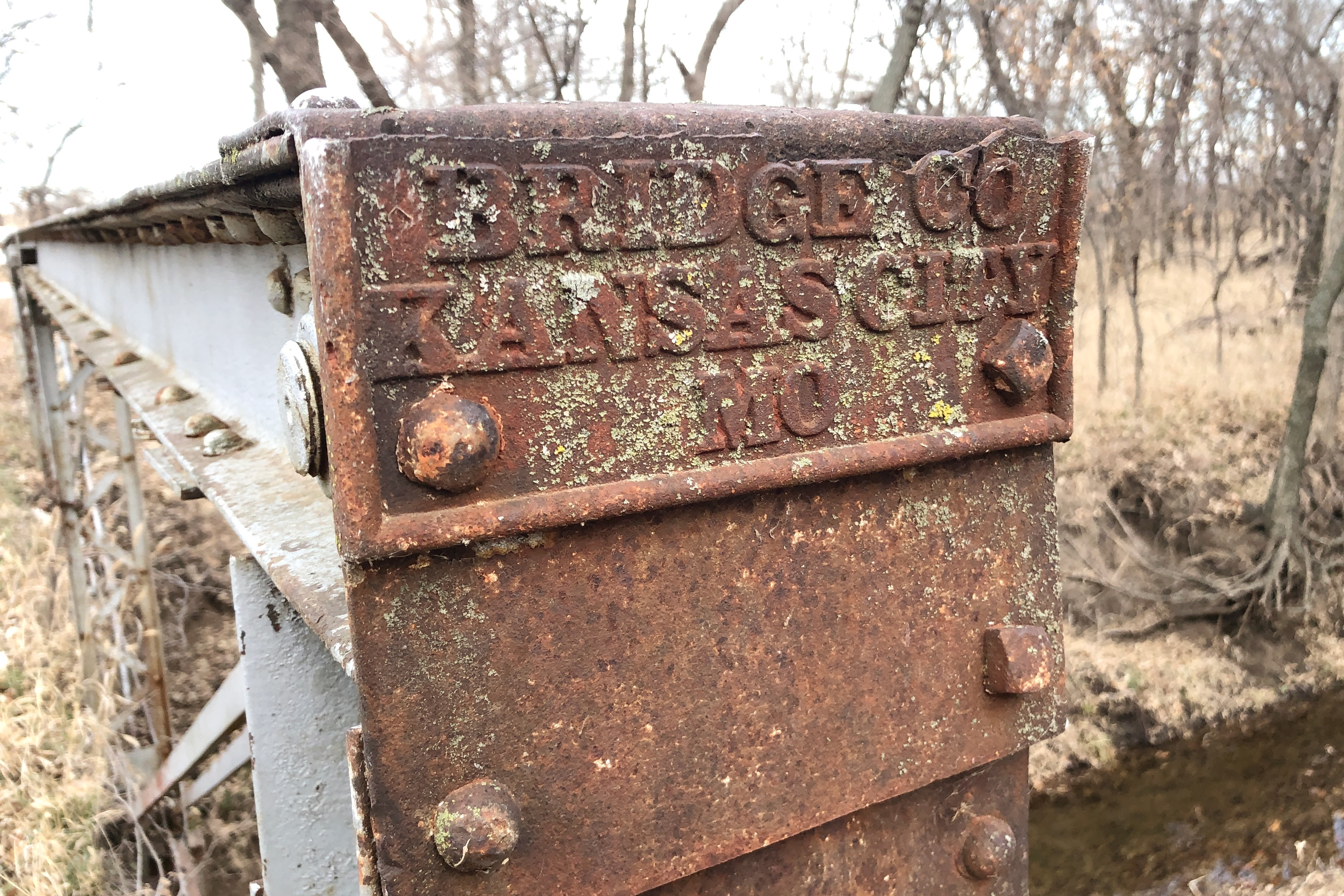

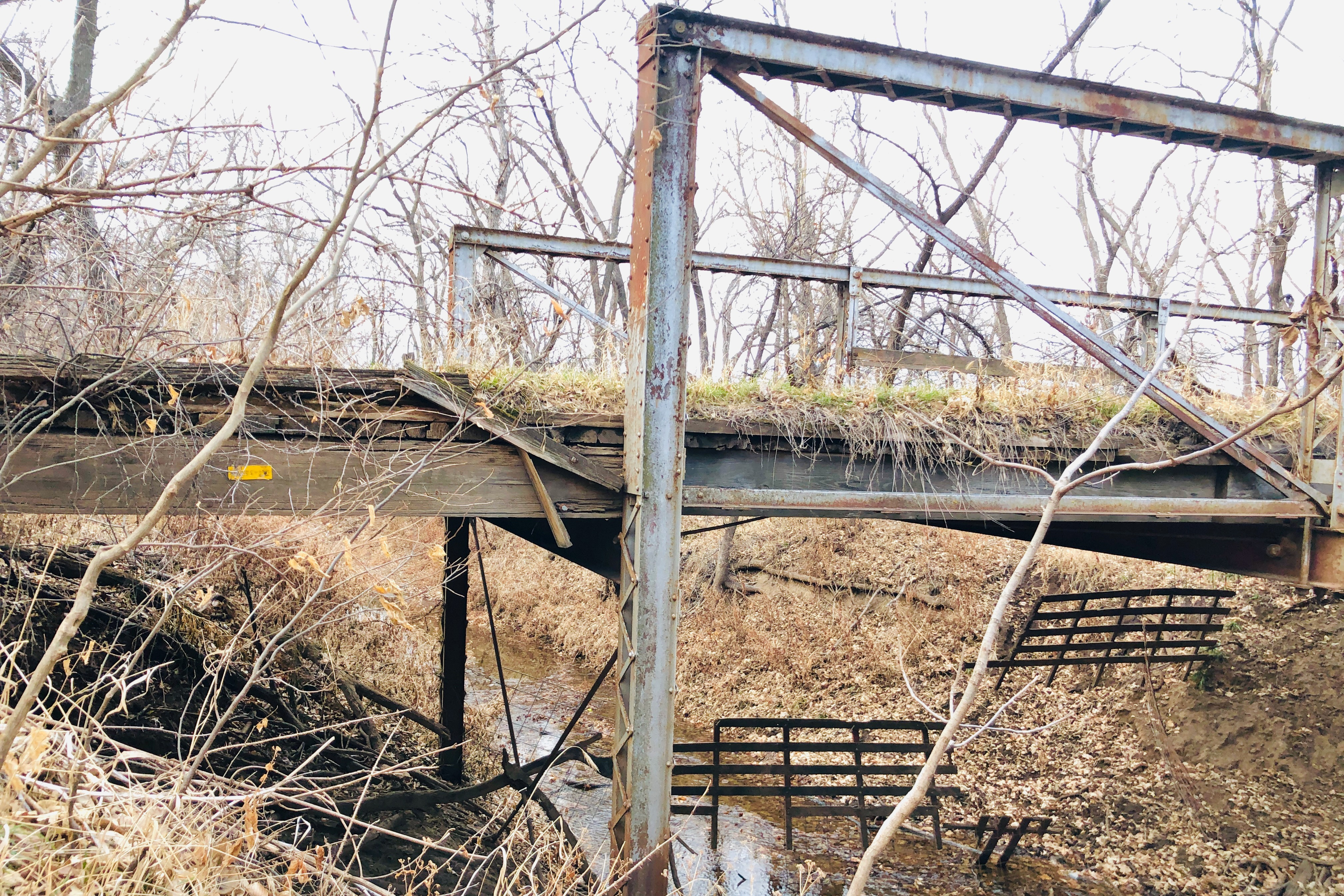

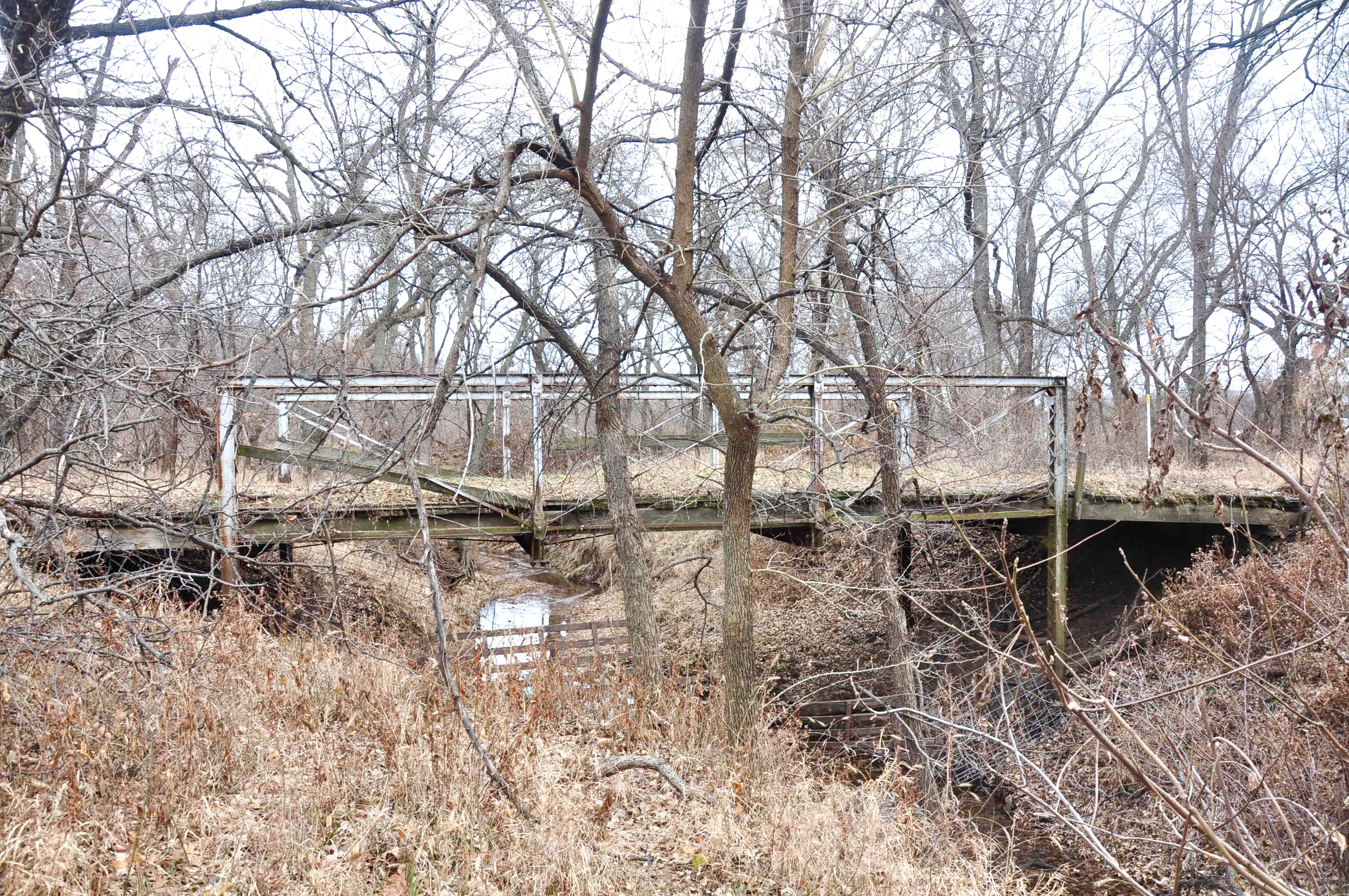

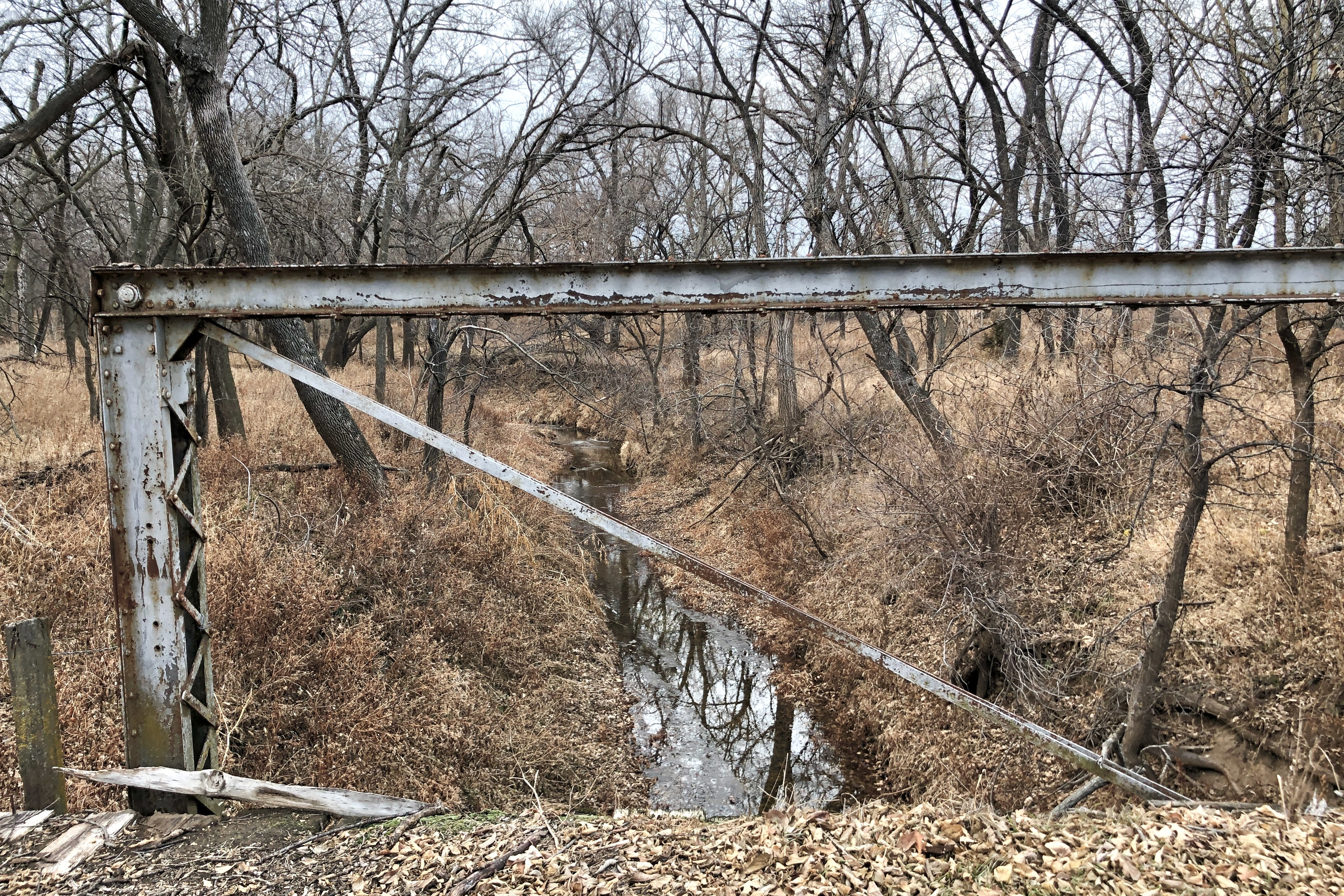

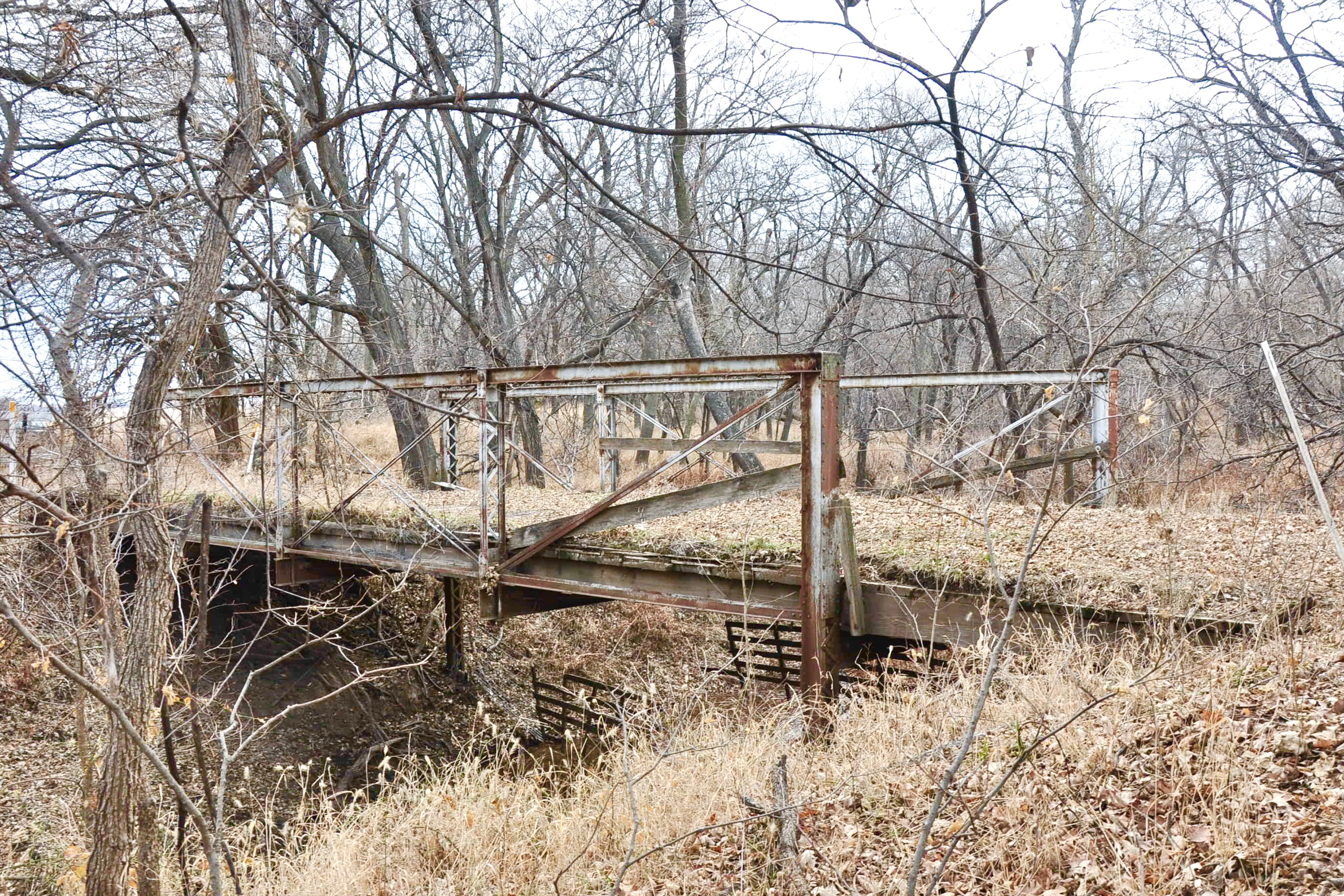

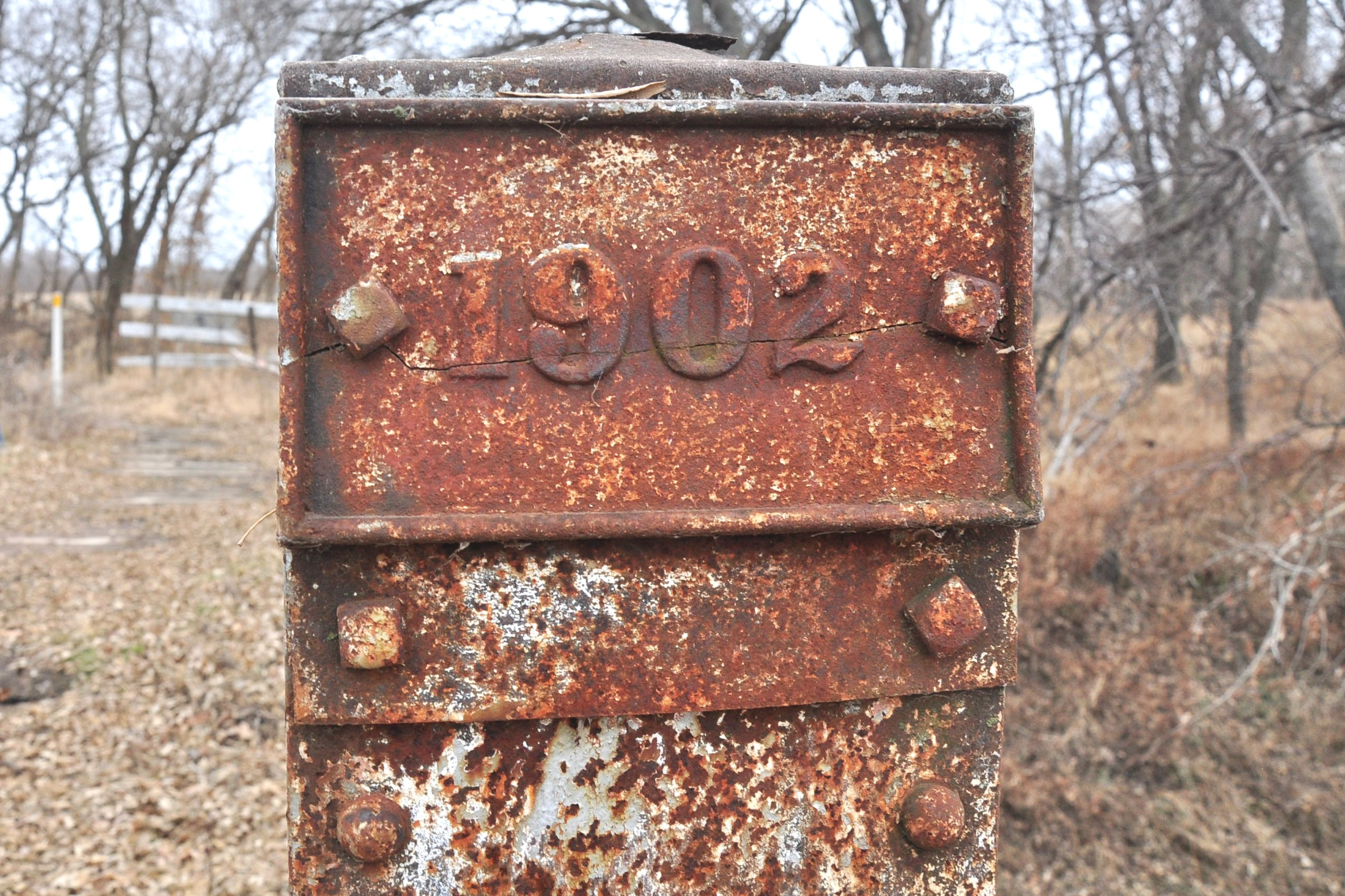

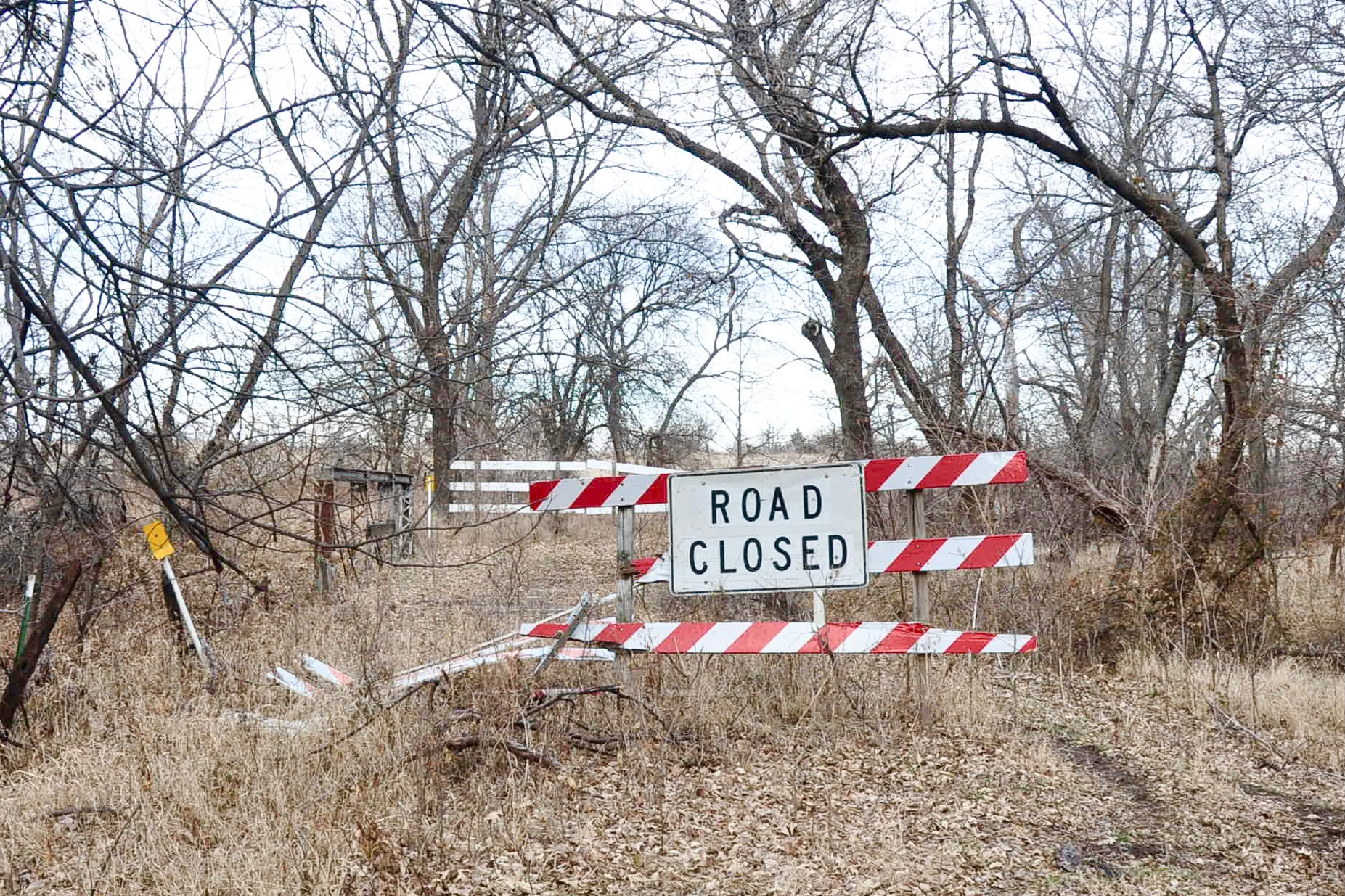

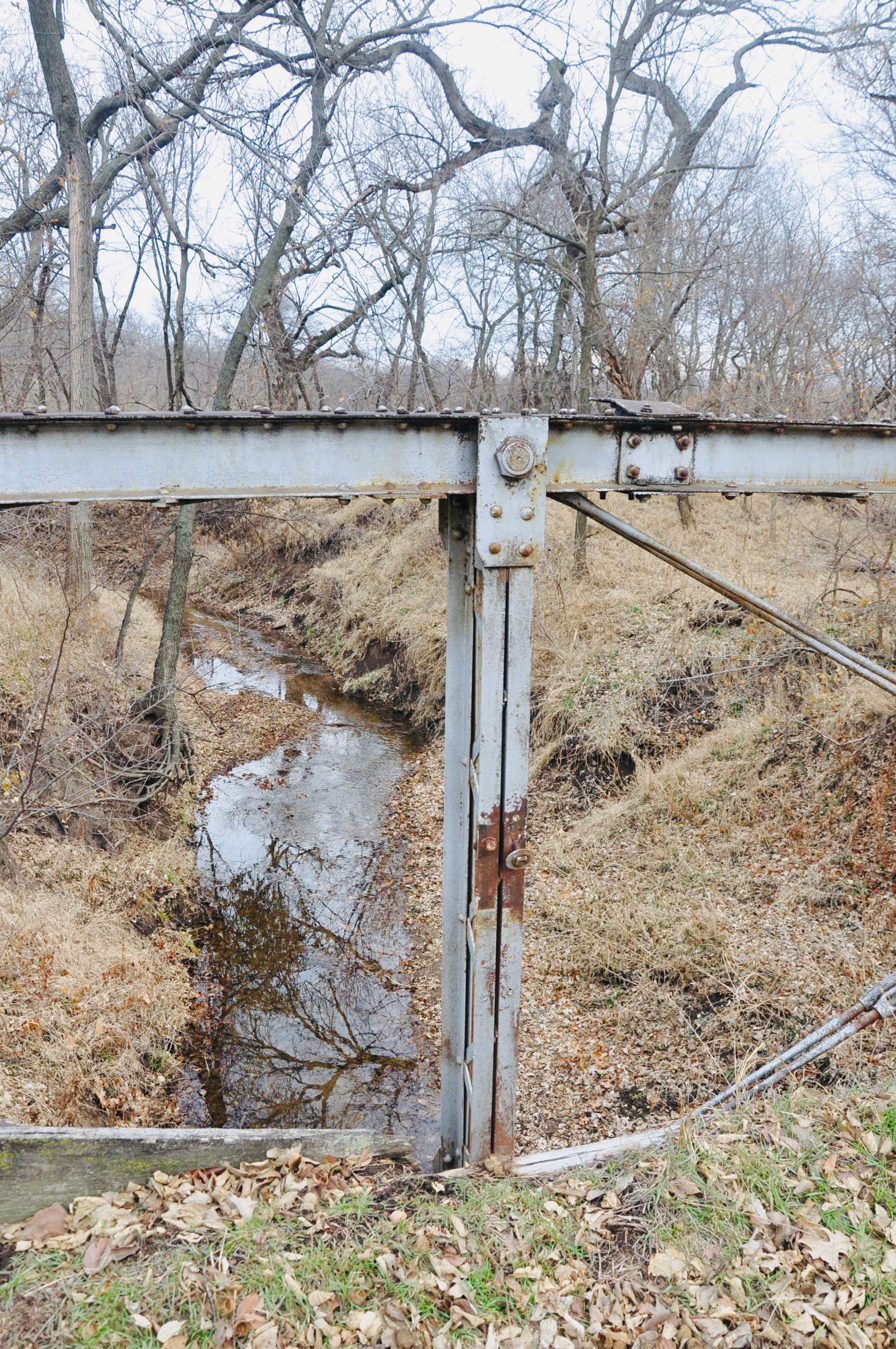
