= South Omaha Veterans Memorial Bridge =

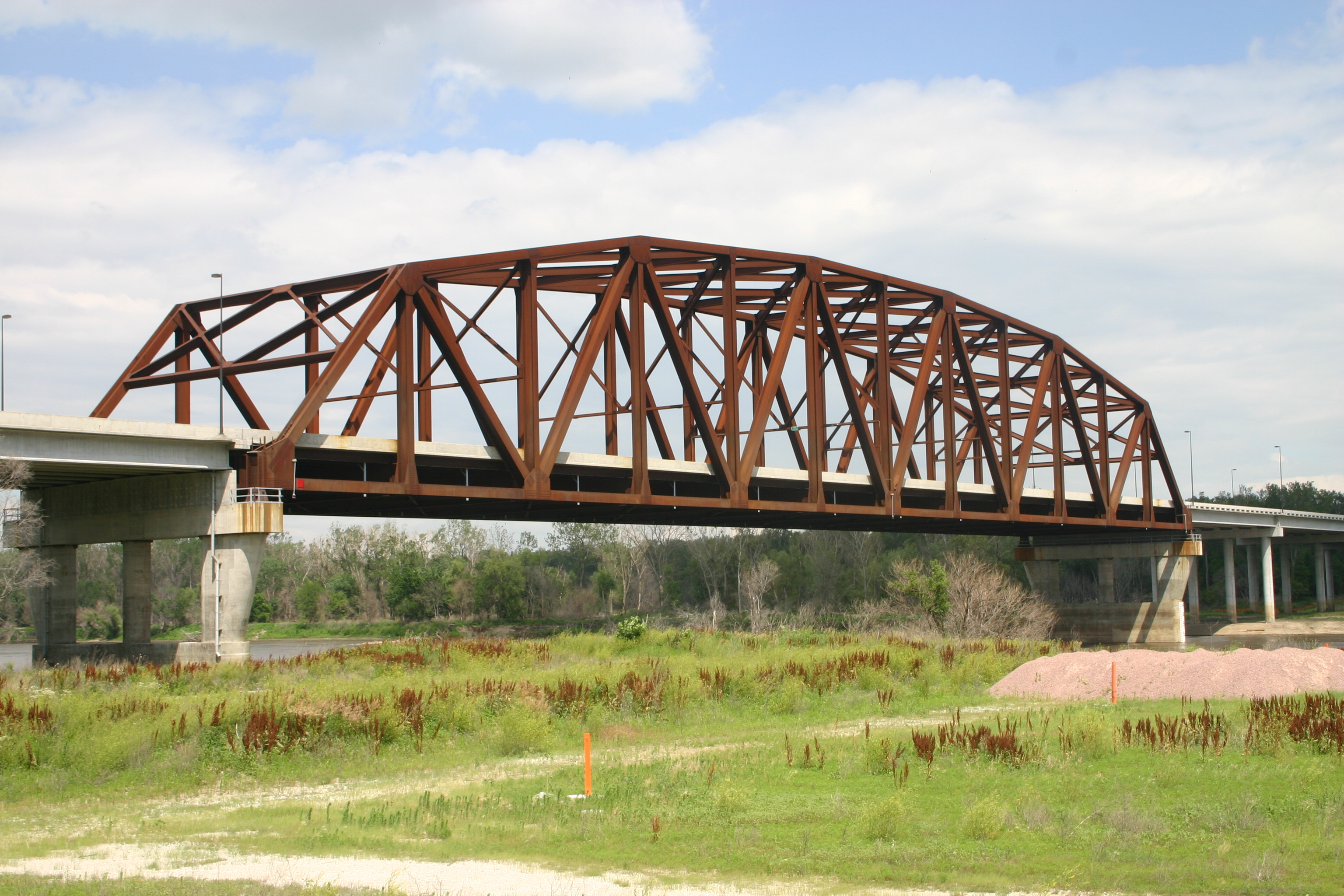
The current South Omaha Veterans Memorial Bridge from the south on the Nebraska side

The South Omaha Veterans Memorial Bridge carries U.S. Route 275 over the Missouri River connecting Omaha, Nebraska with Council Bluffs, Iowa.

== Original bridge ==
- South Omaha Bridge
- Formerly listed on the U.S. National Register of Historic Places
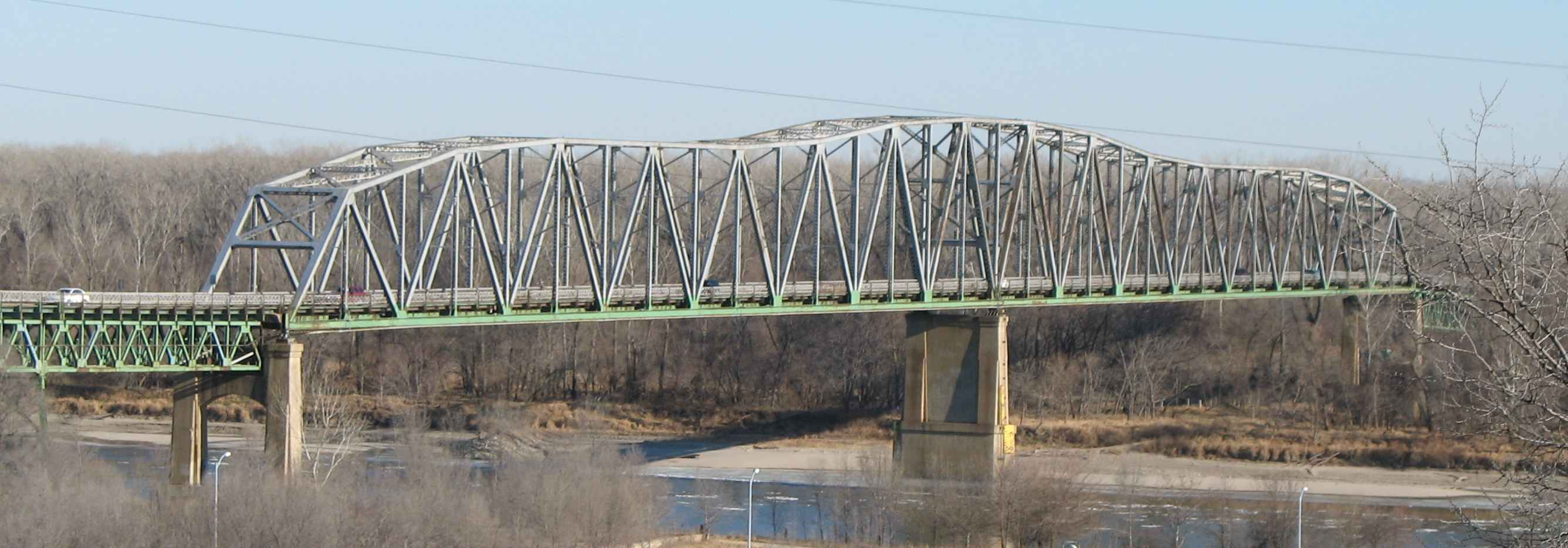
- The old, now-demolished bridge, photographed in 2006

- Location within Iowa Location within the United States
- Location: US 275 / Iowa 92 / N-92, Council Bluffs, Iowa / Omaha, Nebraska
- Coordinates: 41°12′46.64″N 95°55′56.87″W
- Built: 1935
- Architect: Ash, Howard, Needles, & Tammen; Kansas City Bridge Co.
- MPS: Highway Bridges in Nebraska MPS
- NRHP reference No.: 92000742

Significant dates
- Added to NRHP: June 29, 1992
- Removed from NRHP: July 14, 2011

The old bridge was a continuous Warren through-truss bridge that was 4,378 feet (1,334 m) long and provided a clear roadway width of only 22 feet 6 inches (6.86 m).Omaha floated a $2 million bond issue for the bridge in 1931. However, when the bonds did not sell, the Omaha Bridge Commission was formed to secure financing from the Public Works Administration. The initial design by the Kansas City architects Ash, Howard, Needles and Tammen called for the bridge to have seven spans. However, when the War Department announced plans to reroute the river channel, the design was changed to two 525-foot (160 m), continuously supported, Warren through spans and a series of Warren deck truss approach spans.

It was built by the Kansas City Bridge Company opening on January 18, 1936. It is 22.2 feet (6.8 m) wide and 2,126 feet (648 m) long. The piers were initially on dry land, since the river had not been rerouted. Tolls on the bridge were discontinued on September 25, 1947.

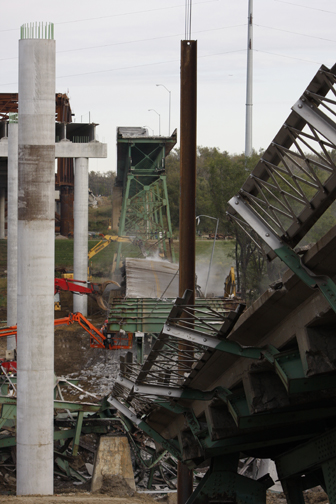
The original bridge's demolition in progress

The bridge provided a much-needed direct route across the Missouri River to the Omaha Stockyards for livestock delivery trucks. Before the South Omaha Bridge was built trucks had to cross the Douglas Street Bridge and drive through downtown Omaha to reach the packinghouse district.

It was listed on the National Register of Historic Places (NHRP) in 1992. In 1995, it was renamed from the South Omaha Bridge to the Veterans Memorial Bridge. In November 2006 Nebraska placed a 5-ton vehicle limit on the bridge. On June 11, 2008, an additional height restriction requiring vehicles to be under 8 feet (2.4 m) was imposed.

On September 8, 2009, at 9 am CDT, the bridge closed so that the new bridge's construction could continue. The original bridge was completely demolished by March 2010 and removed from the NRHP in 2011.

== Current bridge ==
The new bridge is a 625-foot 12-panel Warren through truss bridge, with four 12-foot-wide thru lanes (3.7 m). It has a 4-foot-wide raised median (1.2 m) with 10-foot-wide shoulders (3.0 m) and a 10-foot-wide bike trail (3.0 m). The new bridge is 4,300 feet (1,300 m) long and 87 feet 8 inches (26.72 m) wide. It opened May 28, 2010.

== See also ==
- List of crossings of the Missouri River
- List of historic bridges in Nebraska
