= Nebraska City Bridge =

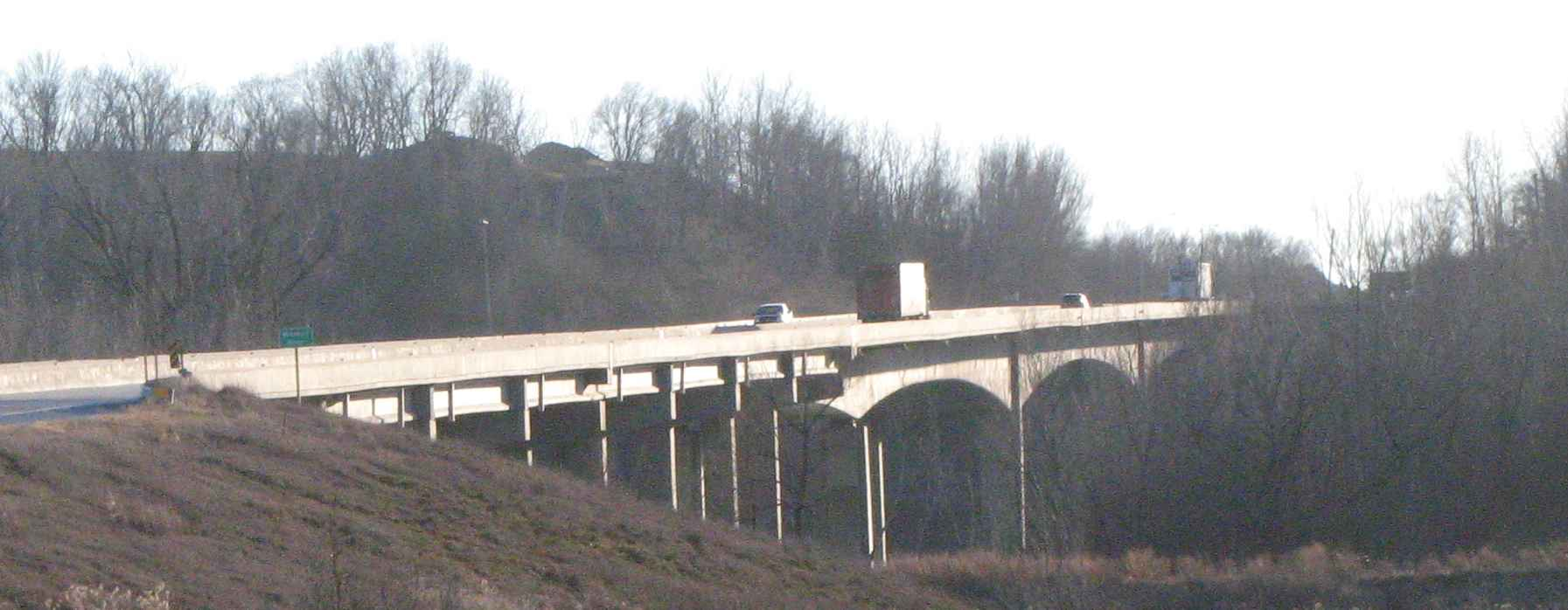
- Coordinates: 40°40′16″N 95°49′49″W
- Carries: N-2/ Iowa 2
- Crosses: Missouri River
- Locale: Nebraska City, Nebraska
- Official name: Nebraska City Bridge
- Other name: Missouri River Bridge
- Maintained by: Iowa Department of Transportation

Characteristics
- Design: Box girder bridge
- Material: Concrete

History
- Opened: 1986; 40 years ago

Location
- Interactive map of Nebraska City Bridge

The Nebraska City Bridge is a four-lane girder bridge over the Missouri River connecting Otoe County, Nebraska with Fremont County, Iowa at Nebraska City, Nebraska.

== Previous bridges ==
A pontoon bridge built in 1888 that claimed to be the largest drawbridge of its kind in the world. The pontoon bridge was more than 2,000 feet (610 m) long and the middle of the bridge could swing open providing a 528-foot (161 m)-wide passage.

The Waubonsie Bridge truss bridge opened in 1930 and went towards the middle of town. The Waubonsie Bridge built by the Kansas City Bridge Company called itself "The Bridge with a State park at Each End" because Arbor Lodge State Park was on the Nebraska side and Waubonsie State Park was on the Iowa side.

== Current bridge ==
The bridge built in 1986 bypasses the central business district. Local usage refers to the new bridge just as "the Missouri River Bridge."

The bridge was constructed as part of a highway plan to provide four-lane access between Lincoln, Nebraska and Interstate 29 in Iowa. The bridge connects Nebraska Highway 2 with Iowa Highway 2.

The bridge was closed to all traffic in April 2019 as a result of the 2019 Midwestern U.S. floods. The bridge reopened with one lane of travel in each direction on August 1, 2019.

== See also ==
- List of crossings of the Missouri River
