= Phelps Hotel =

- U.S. National Register of Historic Places
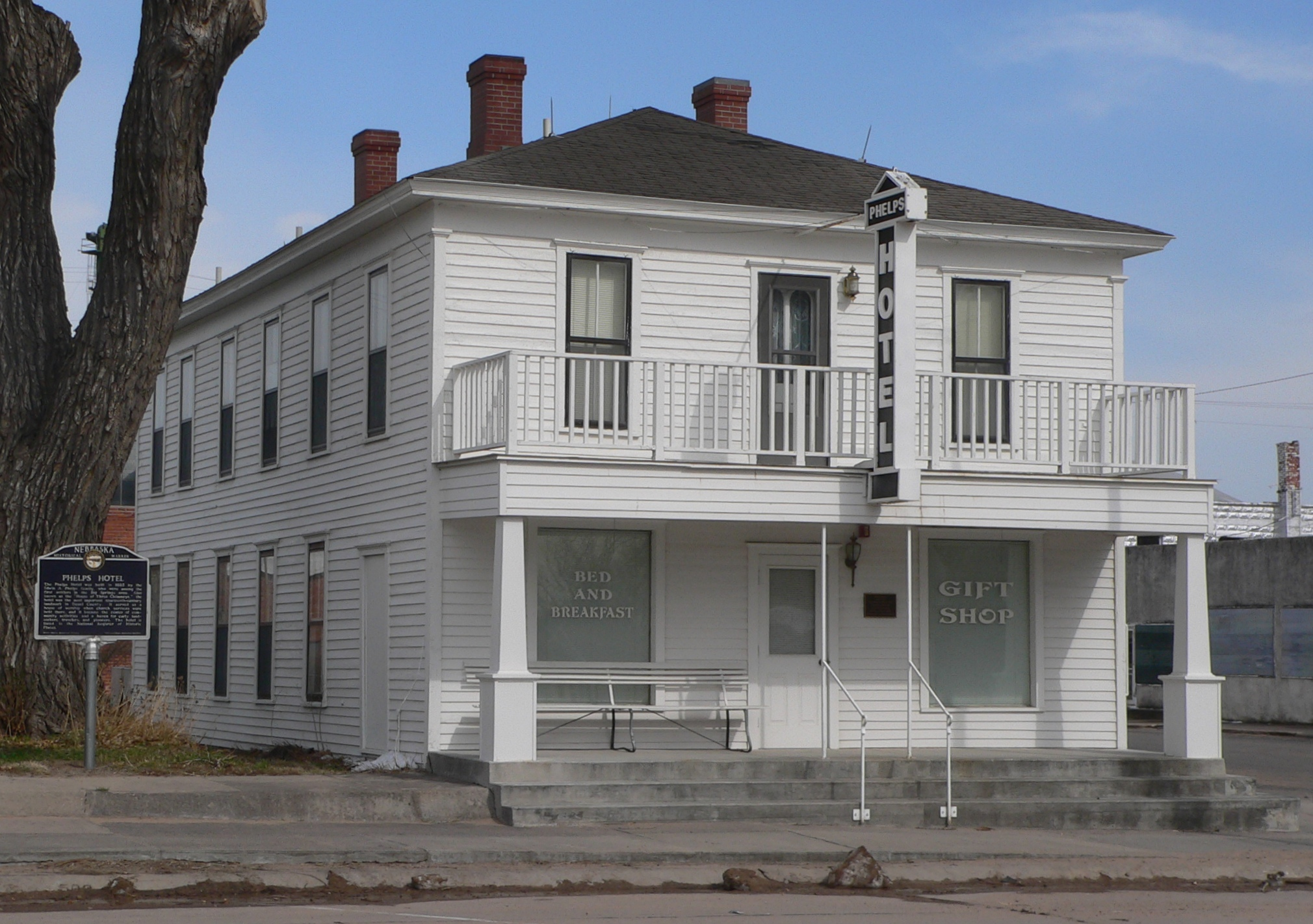

- Location within Nebraska Location within the United States
- Location: NE corner of 2nd and Pine Sts., Big Springs, Nebraska
- Coordinates: 41°3′48″N 102°4′35″W
- Area: 0.3 acres (0.12 ha)
- Built: 1885
- Built by: Kimball, J.W.
- NRHP reference No.: 70000370
- Added to NRHP: October 15, 1970

The Phelps Hotel, located at the NE corner of 2nd and Pine Sts. in Big Springs, Nebraska, United States, was built in 1885. It is the oldest hotel in Deuel County, Nebraska and has been "viewed as the most important nineteenth century landmark" in the county. It has always been owned and managed by the Phelps family, which arrived among early settlers.

It was listed on the National Register of Historic Places in 1970.

The Phelps family is no longer located in Nebraska, nor do they contribute to the upkeep or management. Randy Shaw is the curator and operates the Phelps Hotel as a bed and breakfast. August 6, 2020 was the 101st anniversary of the day when Army Lt. Col. Dwight D. Eisenhower, his wife Mamie, and his in-laws, J.S. Doud and wife, spent the night in the Phelps Hotel as he was on his way to California with more than 200 enlisted Army personnel, as well as almost two dozen Army officers. It is said that famous train robber Sam Bass, and bank robber Dwayne Earl Pope, also spent the night at the Phelps Hotel.
