= Carey's Ford Bridge =

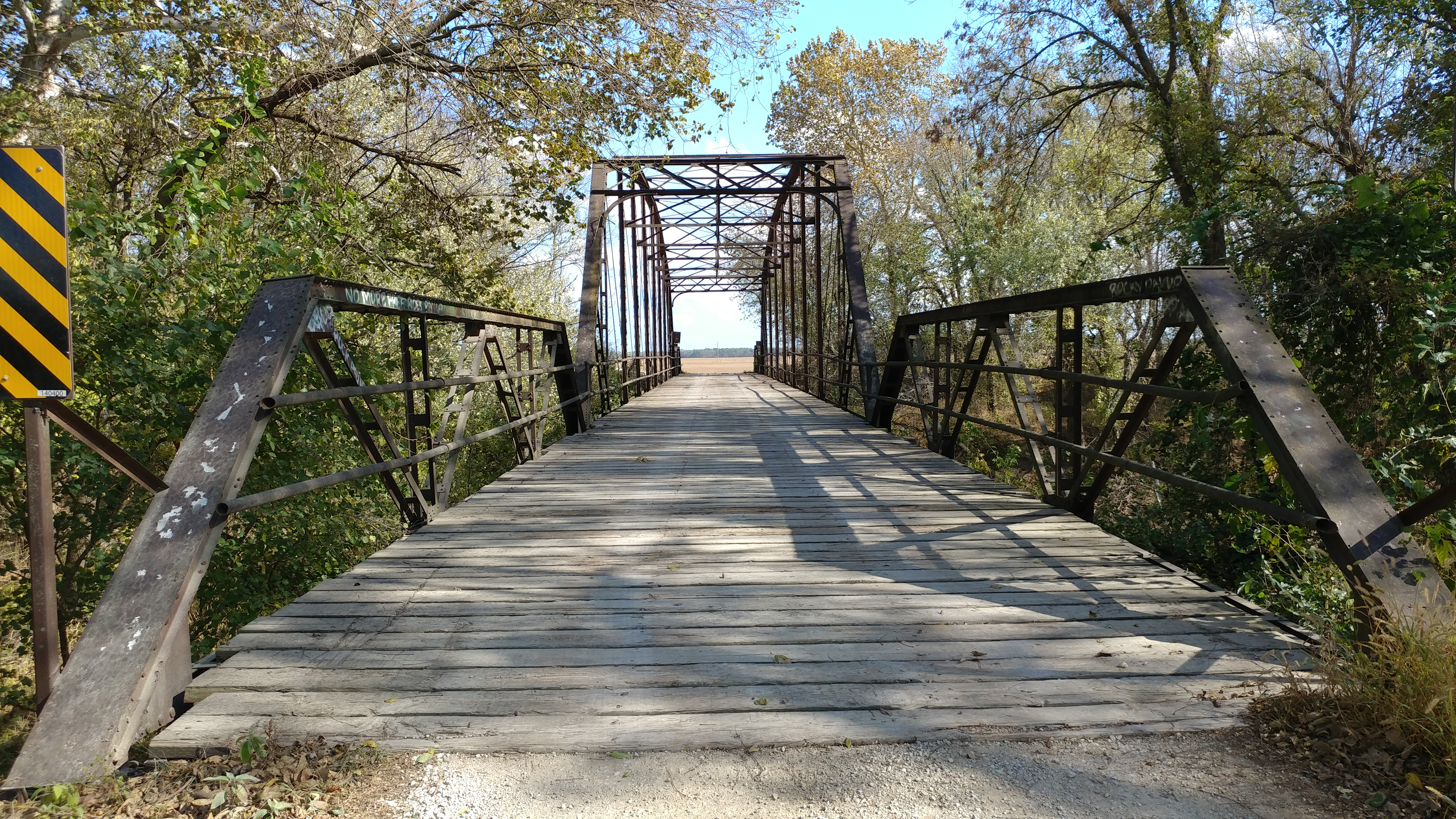
- Carey's Ford Bridge in October 2020
- Coordinates: 38.5207°N 95.0336°W
- Crosses: Marais Des Cygnes River
- Locale: Miami County, Kansas, US

Characteristics
- Material: Steel
- Total length: 248 ft (75.7 m)
- Width: 16 ft (5 m)
- No. of spans: 3

History
- Construction end: 1909; 117 years ago
- Closed: 2021
- Carey's Ford Bridge
- U.S. National Register of Historic Places
- Location within Kansas Location within the United States
- Nearest city: Osawatomie, Kansas
- Coordinates: 38.5207°N 95.0336°W
- Built: 1909; 117 years ago
- Architect: Kansas City Bridge Company
- Architectural style: Camelback Truss
- NRHP reference No.: 89002179
- Added to NRHP: January 4, 1990

Location
- Interactive map of Carey's Ford Bridge

Carey's Ford Bridge is a historic truss bridge located near Osawatomie, Kansas, that spans the Marais des Cygnes River. Built in 1909, it is the oldest of the remaining camelback through truss bridges in the state. The bridge was listed on the National Register of Historic Places in 1990.

== History ==
=== Construction ===
The bridge was born out of a 1908 initiative by Miami County Commissioner W. M. Krumsick to improve access to trade centers, specifically the markets in Osawatomie. The proposal to build four new bridges, including the one at Henry Carey's Ford, was met with significant local controversy. While the need for river crossings was accepted, the total number and specific location at Carey's Ford were contested by citizens and local newspapers.

Despite this opposition and a motion by Commissioner R. Hampson to reject the project due to cost and location disputes, bids for construction of the bridge were received from four builders and the contract was awarded to the Kansas City Bridge Company on December 8, 1908, for a bid of $6,885. Construction was completed the following year.

=== Closure ===
In a statewide inventory conducted between 1980 and 1983, the bridge was identified as a significant representative of its class. However, by the early 21st century, its condition had declined significantly. A 2014 inspection rated the superstructure in "serious" condition, the timber deck in "poor" condition, and overall "structurally deficient".

The bridge was posted for restricted loads for several years, with an inventory rating of only 3 tons. On July 7, 2021, the Miami County Road and Bridge department closed the bridge (identified as Bridge 9-B.6) until further notice.

== Design ==
The Carey's Ford Bridge is a multi-span structure consisting of a primary steel camelback through-truss and two Warren pony truss approach spans. The main span measures 159 ft (48 m) in length, while the total structure extends 248.8 ft (75.8 m) across the river. Rising 37 ft (11 m) above the average water level, the bridge provides a roadway width of 15.5 ft (4.7 m) or 16 ft (5 m) depending on the source.

The bridge's primary camelback truss is a sophisticated variant of the Pratt truss design, distinguished by a polygonal top chord with exactly five slopes. This arched configuration was engineered to provide superior strength and improved stress distribution compared to the standard Pratt truss while maintaining a similar volume of material. While related to the Parker truss (which typically features more numerous slopes on the top chord), the camelback's specific five-slope geometry allowed for greater standardization of its members and a more economical construction.

According to its National Register of Historic Places application, the Carey's Ford Bridge represents a transitional phase in American civil engineering. Although fabricated from steel rather than the wrought iron common in the 19th century, it retains the older practice of using pinned connections for its main joints. By the time of the bridge's construction in 1909, such pin connections were becoming vestigial in Kansas bridge design as riveted construction became the industry standard. In contrast to the pinned main span, the Warren pony spans are of all-riveted construction. The deck is composed of wood.
