= Duane Earl Pope =

American convicted murderer

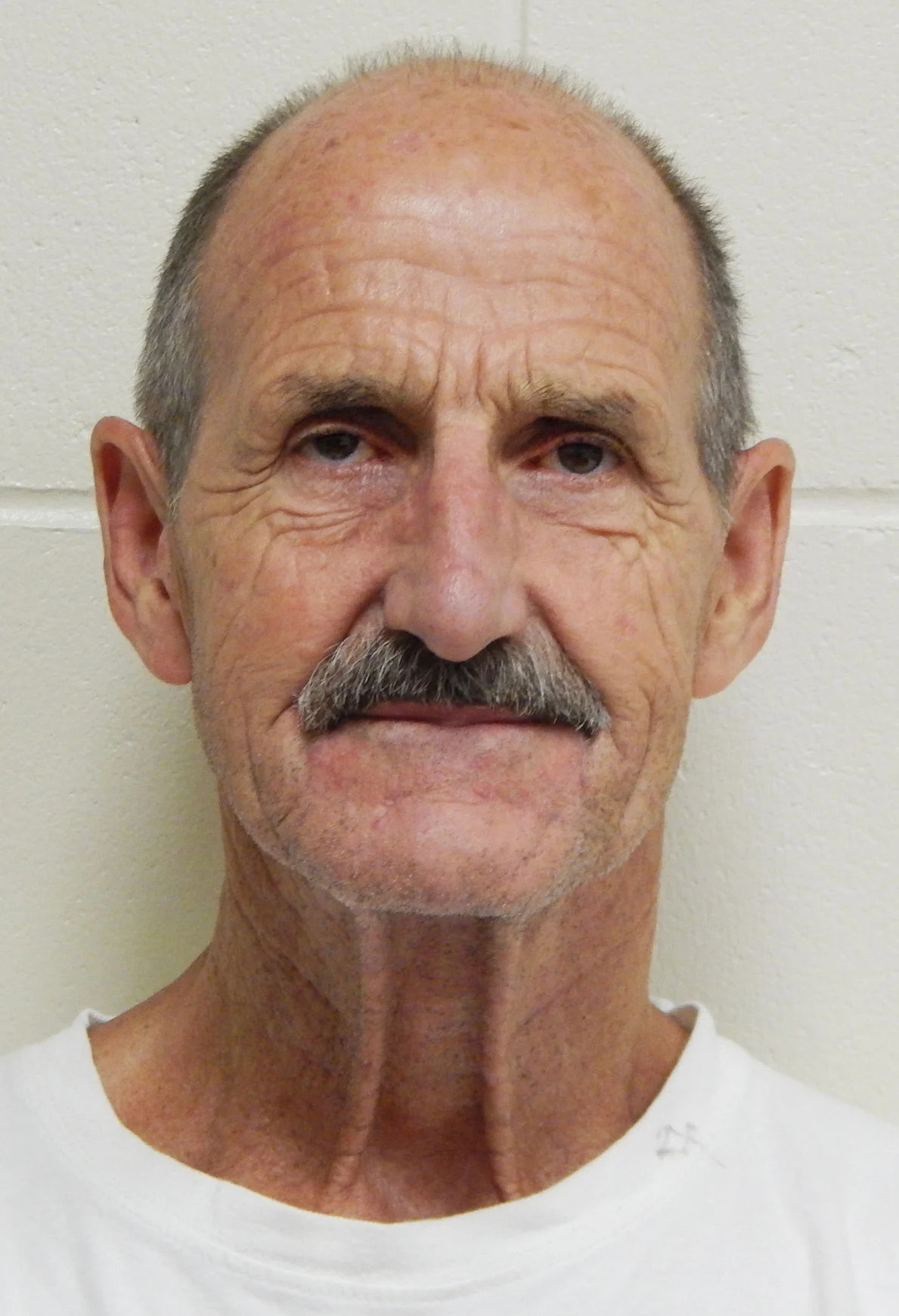
- Pope in a 2016 BOP photograph
- Born: February 8, 1943 (age 83); McPherson, Kansas, U.S.
- Education: Degree Industrial Education
- Alma mater: McPherson College
- Occupations: Farm Worker; Student
- Known for: 3 murders; Bank robbery
- Height: 6 ft 2 in (1.88 m)
- Status: Incarcerated
- Convictions: Federal; Killing during the commission of a bank robbery (3 counts); Assault during the commission of a bank robbery Bank robbery (2 counts); Nebraska; First degree murder (3 counts); Shooting with intent to kill, wound, or maim
- Penalty: Death; commuted to life imprisonment
- Comments: Next Parole Review Date: September 2026

Details
- Date: June 4, 1965
- Country: United States
- State: Nebraska
- Killed: Andreas Kjeldgaard, Glenn Hendrickson, Lois Ann Hothan
- Injured: Franklin Kjeldgaard paralyzed for life
- Weapon: Ruger .38 semiautomatic pistol
- Imprisoned at: Nebraska State Penitentiary

Duane Earl Pope (born February 8, 1943) is an American mass murderer and former fugitive serving a life sentence for the violent 1965 robbery of the Farmers State Bank in Big Springs, Nebraska, in which three people were murdered and one was left severely injured.

== Early life ==
Pope grew up on a small, 160-acre (65 ha) farm outside Roxbury, Kansas, an unincorporated town in the northeast portion of McPherson County. One of eight siblings, he was described as shy, quiet, and athletic as a child. He grew up with a fascination for guns and tractors. He graduated in 1965 from McPherson College in McPherson, Kansas, with a degree in industrial education, although he lacked the teaching component of that degree that would have let him obtain a job teaching high school industrial arts. He had the idea to rob the Big Springs bank while working in wheat fields there one summer while he was in college. In college, he bought several caterpillar tractors/bulldozers and was contemplating starting an excavation business, but needed money for a trailer.

In preparation for the Big Springs robbery, he built handmade silencers for his pistols in the machine shops at his college and experimented with them in his family's barn. He also fashioned a breastplate out of a piece of a bulldozer blade. Two days after graduating from college, Pope borrowed fifty dollars from his father and said he was heading for Oklahoma to look for work. Instead, he went to Salina, Kansas, rented a new car, and drove to Nebraska.

== Criminal career ==
Late in the morning of June 4, 1965, after circling the bank and watching for the morning customers to leave, Pope conversed with a banker pretending to be a landowner seeking a loan. He then pulled out a Ruger .38 semiautomatic pistol and ordered the bank employees to fill his briefcase with cash. After getting what he could (about $1,600), Pope ordered the four bank workers to lie face down on the floor, where he shot them execution-style in the back and in the neck. Three of the victims, bank president Andreas "Andy" Kjeldgaard, 77, cashier Glenn Hendrickson, 59, and bookkeeper Lois Ann Hothan, 35, died instantly. The fourth, Franklin Kjeldgaard, 25, survived, but was paralyzed for life until his death in 2012. Franklin Kjeldgaard, who returned to work at the bank and served as president until 2004, when his family sold it, died July 6, 2012, aged 72.

Pope made a circuitous exit from Big Springs, spotted by several witnesses. He tossed his gun and breastplate along the road; they were recovered by the FBI. He dropped some of the money off at his family home and returned the car to Hertz in Salina. He then traveled by bus and plane to Tijuana, Mexico, by way of Fort Worth and El Paso, Texas. In San Diego, California, Pope discovered that authorities had deduced his identity. He next went to Las Vegas, Nevada, where he gambled and enjoyed himself.

Pope appeared on the FBI 10 Most Wanted List for one day. Upon reading an appeal for him to surrender issued by the president of his college, Pope flew to Kansas City, Missouri, where he turned himself in. He gave a 19-page confession to Kansas City police and was extradited to Nebraska.

Pope's lawyers argued that he was insane and had schizoid personality disorder.

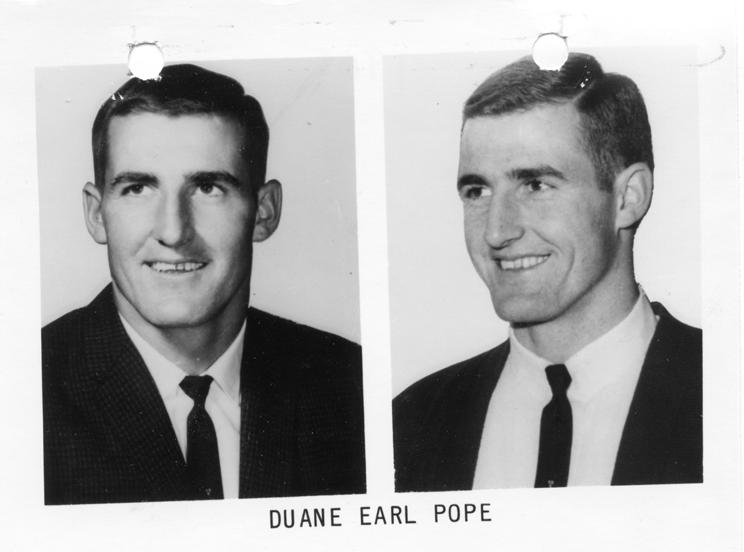
Duane Earl Pope FBI Most Wanted Poster in 1965

Pope was ruled competent to stand trial and was tried in 1965 in front of a federal jury in the U.S. District Court in Lincoln, Nebraska. He was found guilty of six charges, including three counts of murder in the commission of a bank robbery, and sentenced to death. In 1968, Pope's federal death sentence was overturned and he was resentenced to life in prison. In 1970, Pope was tried in state court by a judge in Deuel County, Nebraska. He was convicted of three counts of first degree murder and sentenced to death. His sentence was commuted to life in prison by the U.S. Supreme Court in 1972 as part of the Furman v. Georgia package of cases that determined that the death penalty, as then practiced, was unconstitutional. Pope remained at USP Leavenworth (Register Number: 85021–132) until July 1, 2016. On that date, aged 73, he was granted federal parole and then transported to Nebraska to begin serving three life sentences handed down in 1970 by Nebraska (Department Correctional Services ID: 84196). From 1978–83, while incarcerated, Pope was married to a college girlfriend, Ramona Lowe.
