= Big Springs, Nebraska =

- City
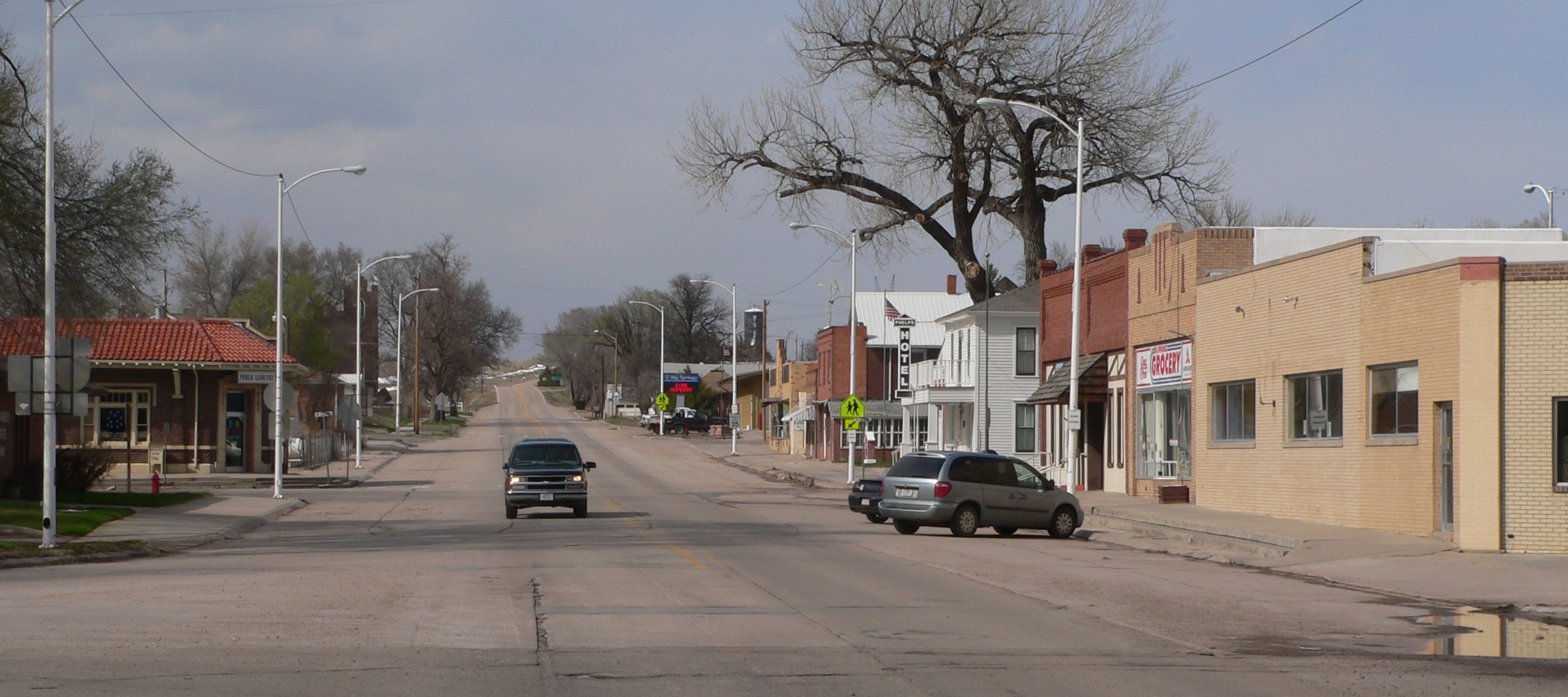
- Downtown Big Springs, looking north up Pine Street

- Location of Big Springs, Nebraska
- Coordinates: 41°03′39″N 102°04′28″W
- Country: United States
- State: Nebraska
- County: Deuel

Area
  - Total: 0.44 sq mi (1.15 km^{2})
  - Land: 0.44 sq mi (1.15 km^{2})
  - Water: 0 sq mi (0.00 km^{2})
- Elevation: 3,370 ft (1,030 m)

Population (2020)
  - Total: 394
  - Density: 889.4/sq mi (343.38/km^{2})
- Time zone: UTC-7 (Mountain (MST))
  - Summer (DST): UTC-6 (MDT)
- ZIP code: 69122
- Area code: 308
- FIPS code: 31-04895
- GNIS feature ID: 2398119
- Website: www.bigspringsne.org

Big Springs is a village in Deuel County, Nebraska, United States. As of the 2020 census, Big Springs had a population of 394.

== History ==
The first name of the settlement was "Lone Tree", after a large cottonwood tree standing alone on the prairie near the town. It was believed to be over 100 years old at the time of first settlement and could be seen by riders on the Pony Express and travelers on the Oregon Trail. Sam Bass's gang reportedly divided $60,000 in loot under the tree from an 1877 robbery of a Union Pacific train.

The railroad named this stop "Big Springs" in 1867. Spring water from near the track was used by steam locomotives until 1950.

Big Springs was platted in 1884, and named for the stream that runs through town. The Big Springs post office, established in 1884, was officially called Bigspring until 1943. The village of Big Springs was incorporated in 1917.

The county fair was held in Big Springs from 1889 to 1932. Chappell, the only other town in the county, became the county seat.

In 1884, the first church services were held by the Rev. E. E. Mount in the Phelps Hotel. The first church in the county, called Prospect Church, was a sod building constructed 9 miles (14 km) north of town in 1887.

In 1965, Duane Earl Pope robbed the Farmers State Bank in Big Springs, killing three people.

== Geography ==
According to the United States Census Bureau, the village has a total area of 0.44 square miles (1.14 km^{2}), all land.

Interstate 76 intersects Interstate 80 near the village. U.S. Route 30, formerly known as the Lincoln Highway, intersects U.S. Route 138 approximately three miles to the north.

== Climate ==
Big Springs has a continental semi-arid climate (Köppen BSk). The station being far inland means it is prone to vast temperature swings. On average between 1991 and 2020, the coldest day of the year had a high of 15 °F (−9 °C) and the warmest night had a low of 69 °F (21 °C). High diurnal temperature variation is common year round. On average there are 173 air frosts but just 28 ice days.

Climate data for Big Springs, Nebraska (1991–2020 normals, (Note: Mean monthly maxima and minima (i.e. the expected highest and lowest temperature readings at any point during the year or given month) calculated based on data at said location from 1991 to 2020.) extremes 1918–1919 & 1940–present)
Month	Jan	Feb	Mar	Apr	May	Jun	Jul	Aug	Sep	Oct	Nov	Dec	Year
Record high °F (°C)	76 (24)	78 (26)	88 (31)	95 (35)	100 (38)	111 (44)	112 (44)	107 (42)	107 (42)	98 (37)	85 (29)	73 (23)	112 (44)
Mean maximum °F (°C)	62 (17)	67 (19)	78 (26)	84 (29)	92 (33)	98 (37)	101 (38)	99 (37)	96 (36)	87 (31)	75 (24)	64 (18)	103 (39)
Mean daily maximum °F (°C)	41.9 (5.5)	44.9 (7.2)	55.3 (12.9)	63.0 (17.2)	72.4 (22.4)	83.8 (28.8)	89.5 (31.9)	87.6 (30.9)	80.2 (26.8)	66.8 (19.3)	53.5 (11.9)	42.5 (5.8)	65.1 (18.4)
Daily mean °F (°C)	27.1 (−2.7)	30.2 (−1.0)	39.5 (4.2)	47.4 (8.6)	57.6 (14.2)	68.9 (20.5)	74.6 (23.7)	72.4 (22.4)	63.4 (17.4)	50.0 (10.0)	37.4 (3.0)	27.8 (−2.3)	49.7 (9.8)
Mean daily minimum °F (°C)	12.4 (−10.9)	15.6 (−9.1)	23.6 (−4.7)	31.8 (−0.1)	42.8 (6.0)	54.0 (12.2)	59.6 (15.3)	57.1 (13.9)	46.7 (8.2)	33.1 (0.6)	21.3 (−5.9)	13.1 (−10.5)	34.3 (1.3)
Mean minimum °F (°C)	−7 (−22)	−2 (−19)	8 (−13)	20 (−7)	29 (−2)	43 (6)	52 (11)	48 (9)	34 (1)	18 (−8)	6 (−14)	−9 (−23)	−13 (−25)
Record low °F (°C)	−33 (−36)	−28 (−33)	−22 (−30)	−10 (−23)	19 (−7)	31 (−1)	38 (3)	35 (2)	22 (−6)	5 (−15)	−13 (−25)	−37 (−38)	−37 (−38)
Average precipitation inches (mm)	0.31 (7.9)	0.42 (11)	0.88 (22)	2.04 (52)	2.52 (64)	2.83 (72)	2.72 (69)	2.16 (55)	1.58 (40)	1.25 (32)	0.48 (12)	0.37 (9.4)	17.56 (446)
Average snowfall inches (cm)	4.0 (10)	7.0 (18)	3.9 (9.9)	3.5 (8.9)	0.2 (0.51)	0.0 (0.0)	0.0 (0.0)	0.0 (0.0)	0.0 (0.0)	1.6 (4.1)	2.1 (5.3)	5.4 (14)	27.7 (70)
Source: NOAA

== Demographics ==
Historical population
Census	Pop.	Note	%±
1920	408		—
1930	595		45.8%
1940	569		−4.4%
1950	527		−7.4%
1960	506		−4.0%
1970	472		−6.7%
1980	505		7.0%
1990	495		−2.0%
2000	418		−15.6%
2010	400		−4.3%
2020	394		−1.5%
U.S. Decennial Census

=== 2010 census ===
As of the census of 2010, there were 400 people, 186 households, and 119 families residing in the village. The population density was 909.1 inhabitants per square mile (351.0/km^{2}). There were 217 housing units at an average density of 493.2 per square mile (190.4/km^{2}). The racial makeup of the village was 94.5% White, 0.8% Native American, 2.5% from other races, and 2.3% from two or more races. Hispanic or Latino of any race were 8.0% of the population.

There were 186 households, of which 19.9% had children under the age of 18 living with them, 53.8% were married couples living together, 5.9% had a female householder with no husband present, 4.3% had a male householder with no wife present, and 36.0% were non-families. 29.6% of all households were made up of individuals, and 17.2% had someone living alone who was 65 years of age or older. The average household size was 2.15 and the average family size was 2.65.

The median age in the village was 50.1 years. 18.7% of residents were under the age of 18; 6% were between the ages of 18 and 24; 16.6% were from 25 to 44; 37.1% were from 45 to 64; and 22% were 65 years of age or older. The gender makeup of the village was 48.8% male and 51.3% female.

=== 2000 census ===
As of the census of 2000, there were 418 people, 187 households, and 124 families residing in the village. The population density was 1,135.0 inhabitants per square mile (438.2/km^{2}). There were 216 housing units at an average density of 586.5 per square mile (226.4/km^{2}). The racial makeup of the village was 95.93% White, 0.48% Native American, 3.35% from other races, and 0.24% from two or more races. Hispanic or Latino of any race were 5.26% of the population.

There were 187 households, out of which 23.0% had children under the age of 18 living with them, 58.3% were married couples living together, 7.0% had a female householder with no husband present, and 33.2% were non-families. 31.0% of all households were made up of individuals, and 16.6% had someone living alone who was 65 years of age or older. The average household size was 2.24 and the average family size was 2.79.

In the village, the population was spread out, with 20.8% under the age of 18, 5.7% from 18 to 24, 20.6% from 25 to 44, 25.4% from 45 to 64, and 27.5% who were 65 years of age or older. The median age was 46 years. For every 100 females, there were 89.1 males. For every 100 females age 18 and over, there were 89.1 males.

As of 2000 the median income for a household in the village was $29,583, and the median income for a family was $39,375. Males had a median income of $25,536 versus $15,962 for females. The per capita income for the village was $16,319. About 5.4% of families and 8.2% of the population were below the poverty line, including 11.8% of those under age 18 and 7.6% of those age 65 or over.
