= Fairfax and Platte Purchase Bridges =

Fairfax Bridge and Platte Purchase Bridge
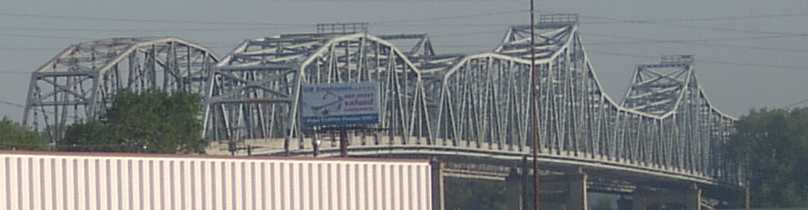
- The bridges in 2006; the Fairfax Bridge is behind the Platte Purchase Bridge
- Coordinates: 39.1566°N 94.6236°W
- Carries: Four lanes of US 69
- Crosses: Missouri River
- Locale: Riverside, Missouri and Kansas City, Kansas
- Maintained by: MoDOT

Characteristics
- Design: Twin continuous truss bridges
- Total length: 2,486.5 feet (757.9 m) (Fairfax Bridge); 2,552.19 feet (777.91 m) (Platte Purchase Bridge)
- Width: 28.31 feet (8.63 m) (Platte Purchase Bridge)
- Longest span: 465.9 feet (142.0 m) (Platte Purchase Bridge)
- Clearance above: 15.02 feet (4.58 m) (Platte Purchase Bridge)

History
- Opened: September 27, 1934 (Fairfax Bridge); 1957 (Platte Purchase Bridge)
- Closed: October 31, 2014, (Fairfax Bridge); Late 2016 (Platte Purchase Bridge)

The Fairfax Bridge and Platte Purchase Bridge were twin continuous truss bridge that carried on U.S. Route 69 (US 69) over the Missouri River.

== Description ==
The Fairfax Bridge, the older of the two, was the southbound span. It was 2,486.5 feet (757.9 m) long and had 13 spans on 15 piers.

The Platte Purchase Bridge was the northbound span. Its biggest span was 465.96 feet, and it was 2552.19 feet long and had a deck width of 28.31 feet and vertical clearance of 15.02 feet. The bridge was named for the Platte Purchase.

At their ends were junctions connecting with Interstate 635 (I-635) in Riverside, Missouri, and the Seventh Street Trafficway in the Fairfax District of Kansas City, Kansas.

== History ==
=== Fairfax Bridge alone ===
Ground was broken April 21, 1931, with the bridge opening on September 27, 1934, at a cost of $600,000. It was built by the Kansas City Bridge Company

=== Twin bridges ===
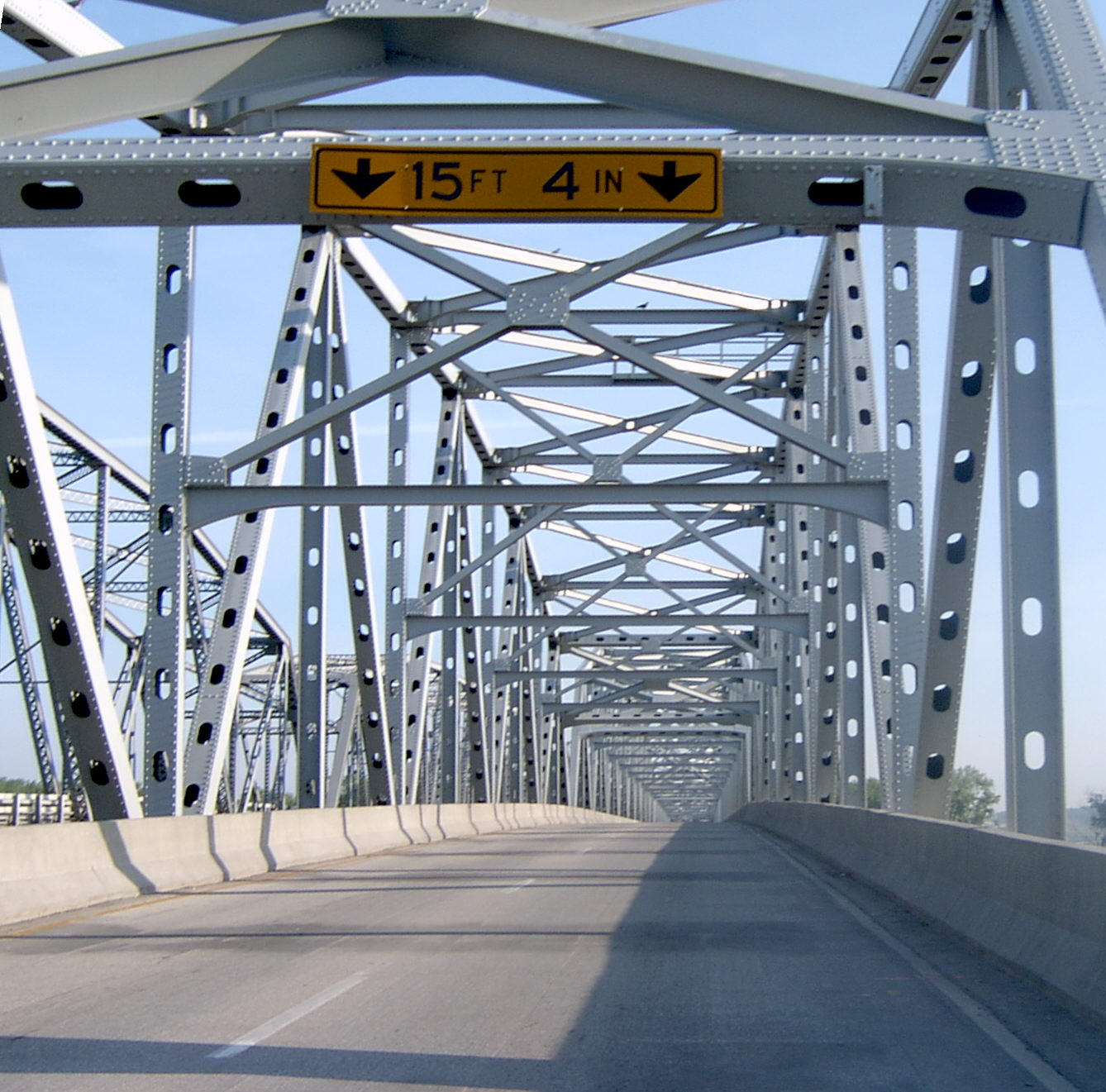
Deck of the Platte Purchase Bridge in 2003

A second bridge was opened in 1957 to alleviate traffic concerns on the older Fairfax Bridge. The Platte Purchase Bridge carried northbound traffic, while the older span carries southbound traffic. This bridge was named for the Platte Purchase.

At this point, the Farfax Bridge was restriped to carry two southbound lanes.

=== Replacement ===
In 2013 plans were announced for replacement of both the Fairfax Bridge and the Platte Purchase Bridge. The Fairfax Bridge was scheduled for demolition first in early 2015, with the bridge closed to all traffic on October 31, 2014, and traffic routed to the Platte Purchase Bridge. The Platte Purchase Bridge was then restricted to handling two-way traffic.

The Platte Purchase bridge was set for demolition in late 2016 when the new bridge opened. The first detonation occurred on the morning of Friday, December 9, 2016, and the rest of the bridge was demolished on Thursday, January 12, 2017.

The replacement bridge was formally opened by the Missouri Department of Transportation on March 16, 2017.

== See also ==
- List of crossings of the Missouri River
