= Roxbury, Kansas =

Unincorporated community in McPherson County, Kansas

- Unincorporated community and CDP
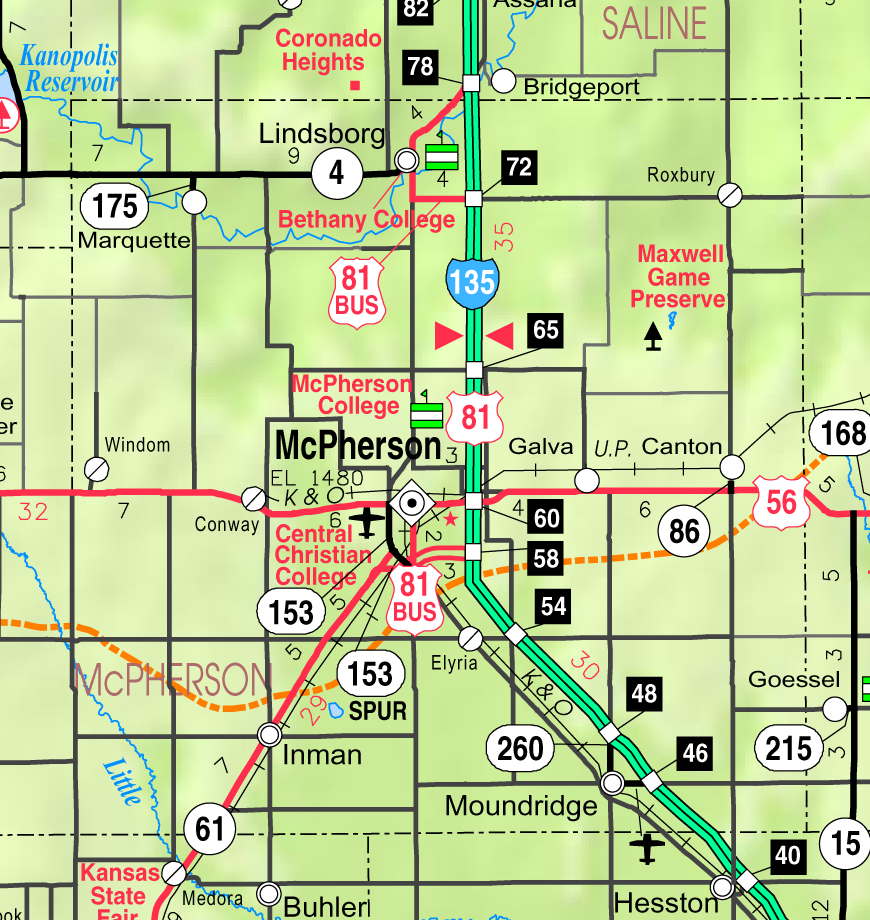
- KDOT map of McPherson County (legend)

- Location within Kansas Location within the United States
- Coordinates: 38°33′3″N 97°25′49″W
- Country: United States
- State: Kansas
- County: McPherson
- Elevation: 1,339 ft (408 m)

Population (2020)
  - Total: 70
- Time zone: UTC-6 (CST)
  - Summer (DST): UTC-5 (CDT)
- Area code: 620
- FIPS code: 20-61550
- GNIS ID: 477097

Roxbury is an unincorporated community and census-designated place (CDP) in McPherson County, Kansas, United States. As of the 2020 census, the population was 70. It is located about 10.5 miles east of Interstate 135.

== History ==
In 1854, the Kansas Territory was organized, then in 1861 Kansas became the 34th U.S. state and in 1867, McPherson County was established within the Kansas Territory. The original name for the community was Colfax, which was established in 1871 with a trading post. It was renamed to Roxbury on March 4, 1875 due to an act of legislature.

== Demographics ==
Historical population
Census	Pop.	Note	%±
2020	70		—
U.S. Decennial Census

== Education ==
Roxbury is served by the Smoky Valley USD 400 public school district. Its own schools were closed in 1965 due to school unification. The Roxbury High School team name was Roxbury Lions.

== Notable people ==
- Wendell Johnson, psychologist
- Duane Pope, convicted bank robber and murderer
