= K-292 (Kansas highway) =

Former state highway in Kansas, United States

K-292
- Former K-292 highlighted in red

Route information
- Maintained by KDOT
- Length: 0.75 mi (1,210 m)
- Existed: December 12, 1945–June 22, 1960

Major junctions
- West end: K-92 northeast of Springdale
- East end: K-92 northeast of Springdale

Location
- Country: United States
- State: Kansas
- Counties: Leavenworth

Highway system
- Kansas State Highway System; Interstate; US; State; Spurs
← K-285	→ K-296

K-292 was a 3/4-mile-long (1.21 km) state highway in the U.S. state of Kansas. K-292's western terminus was at K-92 northeast of the unincorporated community of Springdale and the eastern terminus was at K-92 northeast of Springdale. It served the former Springdale Covered Bridge and was a two-lane road its entire length.

In 1859, the Springdale Covered Bridge was completed over Stranger Creek. In 1926, K-92 was designated as a state highway, which used the covered bridge to cross the river. By 1932, a new steel-concrete bridge was completed slightly north, which K-92 was then realigned onto. The covered bridge remained in use until mid-1943 when it was closed due to breaks in the wooden decking. Due to the historical significance of the bridge, it was added to the state highway system as K-292 in 1945, then was restored in 1946. Early in the morning on September 21, 1958, lightning struck, which burned and destroyed the bridge. Due to the bridge being burned down and the state highway serving no purpose, K-292 was removed from the highway system in a June 22, 1960 resolution.

== Route description ==
K-292 began at K-92 northeast of the unincorporated community of Springdale. It traveled southeastward, on what is now 227th Street, through a forested area along Stranger Creek, a tributary of the Kansas River. After roughly 0.8 miles (1.3 km), the roadway began to curve to the northeast. The highway continued for about 0.1 miles (160 m) and crossed Stranger Creek via a covered bridge. K-292 continued past the bridge for a short distance before ending back at K-92.

== History ==
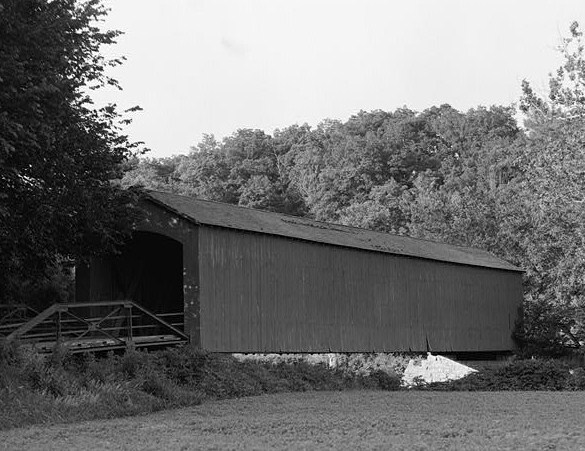
Former covered bridge, taken June 1958

In the mid 1800s, wagon trains coming to and from the Frontier Army's Fort Leavenworth were slowed down due to having to ford Stranger Creek. On June 12, 1858, the Leavenworth County commissioners appointed surveyors to plan a road between Leavenworth and Ozawkie, which crossed Stranger Creek along the way. On July 12, 1858, the county board appropriated $4,500 (equivalent to $122,000 in 2023) for construction of the bridge. On February 9, 1859, an additional $1,500 (equivalent to $41,000 in 2023) was appropriated to finish the bridge. In 1859, the Springdale Covered Bridge was completed at a cost of $6,000 (equivalent to $163,000 in 2023). In 1926, K-92 was designated as a state highway, which crossed the covered bridge. Three other covered bridges built in Easton, Farmington, and Jarbalo, were removed in the 1930s. In 1932, a new $32,000 (equivalent to $582,000 in 2023) steel-concrete bridge was completed about 1/4 mile (400 m) north and K-92 was realigned onto it. In 1936, a grass fire lit the approaches to the covered bridge, but was quickly extinguished. After this incident one 50-U.S.-gallon steel barrel (190 L) was kept full of water at each end of the bridge. The covered bridge remained in use until May 24, 1943, when it was closed due to breaks in the wooden decking of the bridge.

In a December 12, 1945 resolution, due to the historical significance, it was approved to add the covered bridge and the roadways running to it to the state highway system as K-292. In 1946, the State Highway Commission started a restoration project on the bridge, which included a new roof and siding. On September 21, 1958, at 2 a.m. Central Daylight Time, farmers in the area reported hearing a lightning strike. Around 5:30 a.m., eyewitnesses reported that the bridge collapsed into the creek due to the fire. Due to the bridge being burned down and the state highway serving no purpose, K-292 was removed from the highway system in a June 22, 1960 resolution.

== Major intersections ==
The entire route was in Alexandria Township, Leavenworth County.

mi	km	Destinations	Notes
0.00	0.00	K-92 (Springdale Road)	Western terminus
0.75	1.21	K-92 (Springdale Road)	Eastern terminus
1.000 mi = 1.609 km; 1.000 km = 0.621 mi
