= K-192 (Kansas highway) =

State highway in Kansas, U.S.

K-192
- K-192 highlighted in red

Route information
- Maintained by KDOT
- Length: 16.241 mi (26.137 km)
- Existed: January 4, 1939–present

Major junctions
- West end: US-59 / K-16 west-northwest of Winchester
- East end: US-73 / K-7 west-northwest of Leavenworth

Location
- Country: United States
- State: Kansas
- Counties: Jefferson, Leavenworth

Highway system
- Kansas State Highway System; Interstate; US; State; Spurs
| ← K-191 | → K-193 |

K-192 is a 16.241-mile-long (26.137 km) east–west state highway in the U.S. state of Kansas. K-192's western terminus is at U.S. Route 59 (US-59) and K-16 west-northwest of Winchester and the eastern terminus is at US-73 and K-7 west-northwest of Leavenworth. K-192 travels mostly through rural land but does pass through the cities of Winchester and Easton.

Before state highways were numbered in Kansas there were auto trails. The former Corn Belt Route and South West Trail closely followed the highways western terminus. The former George Washington National Highway and King of Trails followed the highways eastern terminus. K-192 was first designated a state highway on January 4, 1939. In 1964, the western terminus was shortened slightly when a new alignment of US-59 was built, and then in 1999, the eastern terminus was shortened when US-73 was moved to a new alignment.

== Route description ==
The Kansas Department of Transportation (KDOT) tracks the traffic levels on its highways, and in 2017, they determined that on average the traffic varied from 625 vehicles per day slightly east of Winchester to 2280 vehicles per day near the eastern terminus. K-192 is not included in the National Highway System, which is a system of highways important to the nation's defense, economy, and mobility. K-192 does connect to the National Highway System at its eastern and western terminus. The majority of the route is paved with partial design bituminous pavement except for the segment within the Easton city limits, which is full design bituminous pavement.

=== Jefferson County ===
K-192 begins at an intersection with US-59 and K-16 west-northwest of Winchester. The highway crosses Crooked Creek and begins traveling east through flat rural farmlands. After roughly two miles (3.2 km) it curves to the south at an intersection with Saline Road. It continues south for 0.5 miles (0.80 km) then curves east and enters the city of Winchester as Delaware Street. K-192 continues through the city and passes Covenanter Cemetery and after approximately 0.6 miles (0.97 km) exits the city. The highway continues east for roughly two miles (3.2 km) and intersects Mooney Creek Road. From here it continues for about one mile (1.6 km) and then curves north at an intersection with 154th Street. The roadway continues north for 0.5 miles (0.80 km) then curves back east. It then continues east through flat rural farmlands for about 1.5 miles (2.4 km) and enters into Leavenworth County.

=== Leavenworth County ===
After entering Leavenworth County, K-192 continues east through flat lands for roughly two miles (3.2 km) then curves northeastward. Here the landscape transitions to lightly forested rolling hills as it continues northeastward. The highway soon crosses Dawson Creek then passes by Lawrence Cemetery as it curves back to the east. The highway then curves southeast at Potter Road and becomes Dawson Street. It then enters Easton and turns east onto Riley Street. The highway continues along Riley Street for about one mile (1.6 km) then exits the city. K-192 then crosses Stranger Creek and curves northeast. It continues for two miles (3.2 km), through lightly forested rolling hills, then curves to the east. From here the road continues 0.8 miles (1.3 km) then curves north at Seven Sisters Road. After curving north it travels 0.5 miles (0.80 km) then turns back east at 207 Street. The highway continues east for 0.5 miles (0.80 km) and then reaches its eastern terminus at K-7 and US-73 west-northwest of Leavenworth.

== History ==
Before state highways were numbered in Kansas there were auto trails, which were an informal network of marked routes that existed in the United States and Canada in the early part of the 20th century. The former Corn Belt Route and South West Trail closely followed the highways western terminus. The former George Washington National Highway and King of Trails followed the highways eastern terminus.

K-192 was first designated a state highway on January 4, 1939, by the State Highway Commission of Kansas, now known as KDOT. On August 12, 1964, the western terminus of K-192 was truncated 1.124 miles (1.809 km) when US-59 was moved onto a new alignment slightly east. In a March 9, 1990 resolution, the eastern terminus of K-192 was truncated 0.379 miles (0.610 km) when US-73 and K-7 were moved onto a new alignment between Leavenworth and Lowemont.

== Major intersections ==
| County | Location | mi | km | Destinations | Notes |
|---|---|---|---|---|---|
| Jefferson | Jefferson Township | 0.000 | 0.000 | US-59 / K-16 – Valley Falls, Oskaloosa, Nortonville, Atchison | Western terminus |
| Leavenworth | Kickapoo Township | 16.241 | 26.137 | US-73 / K-7 (Amelia Earhart Road) – Atchison, Leavenworth, Lansing | Eastern terminus |
1.000 mi = 1.609 km; 1.000 km = 0.621 mi
