= Reno Township, Leavenworth County, Kansas =

Township in Leavenworth County, Kansas, U.S.

Reno Township
- Township
- Location in Leavenworth County
- Coordinates: 39°01′13″N 95°07′34″W
- Country: United States
- State: Kansas
- County: Leavenworth

Area
  - Total: 43.587 sq mi (112.89 km^{2})
  - Land: 42.692 sq mi (110.57 km^{2})
  - Water: 0.895 sq mi (2.32 km^{2}) 2.05%

Population (2020)
  - Total: 1,419
  - Density: 33.24/sq mi (12.83/km^{2})
- Time zone: UTC-6 (CST)
  - Summer (DST): UTC-5 (CDT)
- Area code(s): 913, 785

Reno Township is a township in Leavenworth County, Kansas, United States. As of the 2020 census, its population was 1,419.

== Geography ==
Reno Township covers an area of 43.587 square miles (112.89 square kilometers).

=== Communities ===
- Fall Leaf
- Reno

=== Adjacent townships ===
- Tonganoxie Township, Leavenworth County (north)
- Stranger Township, Leavenworth County (northeast)
- Sherman Township, Leavenworth County (east)
- Eudora Township, Douglas County (south)
- Wakarusa Township, Douglas County (southwest)
- Grant Township, Douglas County (west)
- Sarcoxie Township, Jefferson County (northwest)

=== Major highways ===
- K-32
- I-70
- US-40
