= Easton Township, Kansas =

Township in Leavenworth County, Kansas, U.S.

Easton Township
- Township
- Location in Leavenworth County
- Coordinates: 39°22′14″N 95°7′42″W
- Country: United States
- State: Kansas
- County: Leavenworth

Area
  - Total: 42.345 sq mi (109.67 km^{2})
  - Land: 42.298 sq mi (109.55 km^{2})
  - Water: 0.047 sq mi (0.12 km^{2}) 0.11%

Population (2020)
  - Total: 1,071
  - Density: 25.32/sq mi (9.776/km^{2})
- Time zone: UTC-6 (CST)
  - Summer (DST): UTC-5 (CDT)
- Area code: 913

Easton Township is a township in Leavenworth County, Kansas, United States. As of the 2020 census, its population was 1,071.

== Geography ==
Easton Township covers an area of 42.345 square miles (109.67 square kilometers).

=== Communities ===
- Easton

=== Adjacent townships ===
- Mount Pleasant Township, Atchison County (northwest)
- Walnut Township, Atchison County (northeast)
- Kickapoo Township, Leavenworth County (east)
- High Prairie Township, Leavenworth County (southeast)
- Alexandria Township, Leavenworth County (south)
- Jefferson Township, Leavenworth County (southwest)
- Norton Township, Jefferson County (west)

=== Major highways ===
- K-192
