= Kickapoo (disambiguation) =

The Kickapoo are a Native American nation.

Kickapoo may also refer to:

== People ==
- Kickapoo language, spoken by that people
- Kickapoo Tribe of Kansas, a federally recognized tribe of Kickapoo people
- Kickapoo Tribe of Oklahoma, a federally recognized tribe of Kickapoo people
- Kickapoo Tribe of Texas, a federally recognized tribe of Kickapoo people
- Mexican Kickapoo, an Indigenous people of Mexico

== Places ==
=== United States ===
- Kickapoo, Indiana
- Kickapoo, Kansas
- Kickapoo State Recreation Area, Illinois
- Kickapoo, Wisconsin, a town
- Kickapoo Center, Wisconsin, an unincorporated community
- Kickapoo, Illinois
- Kickapoo Downtown Airport, a city-owned public-use airport located in Wichita County, Texas, United States
- Kickapoo High School:
  - Kickapoo High School (Springfield, Missouri)
  - Kickapoo High School (Viola, Wisconsin)
- Camp Kickapoo, a former Boy Scout Camp near Jackson, Mississippi
- Kickapoo Township (disambiguation)

== Other uses ==
- Kickapoo River in Wisconsin
- Lake Kickapoo in Archer County, Texas
- Kickapoo Cavern State Park, a park in Texas
- USS Kickapoo, the name of two ships in the U.S. Navy
- "Kickapoo", a song by Tenacious D on the soundtrack album The Pick of Destiny
- Kickapoo Joy Juice, a carbonated soft drink by Monarch Beverage Company distributed in South-East Asia
- Old Kickapoo, a cannon used in Bleeding Kansas
- Emma Kickapoo (1880-1942), artists' model

== See also ==
- Kickapoo High School (disambiguation)
