= Stranger Township, Kansas =

Township in Leavenworth County, Kansas, U.S.

Stranger Township
- Township
- Location in Leavenworth County
- Coordinates: 39°07′32″N 95°01′21″W
- Country: United States
- State: Kansas
- County: Leavenworth

Area
  - Total: 49.052 sq mi (127.04 km^{2})
  - Land: 48.891 sq mi (126.63 km^{2})
  - Water: 0.161 sq mi (0.42 km^{2}) 0.33%

Population (2020)
  - Total: 5,081
  - Density: 103.9/sq mi (40.13/km^{2})
- Time zone: UTC-6 (CST)
  - Summer (DST): UTC-5 (CDT)
- Area code: 913

Stranger Township is a township in Leavenworth County, Kansas, United States. As of the 2020 census, its population was 5,081.

== Geography ==
Stranger Township covers an area of 43.587 square miles (112.89 square kilometers).

=== Communities ===
- part of Tonganoxie

=== Adjacent townships ===
- High Prairie Township, Leavenworth County (north)
- Fairmount Township, Leavenworth County (east)
- Sherman Township, Leavenworth County (south)
- Reno Township, Leavenworth County (southwest)
- Tonganoxie Township, Leavenworth County (west)
- Alexandria Township, Leavenworth County (northwest)

=== Major highways ===
- I-70
- US-40
