= Fairmount Township, Leavenworth County, Kansas =

Township in Leavenworth County, Kansas, U.S.

Fairmount Township
- Township
- Location in Leavenworth County
- Coordinates: 39°8′10″N 94°56′40″W
- Country: United States
- State: Kansas
- County: Leavenworth

Area
  - Total: 39.409 sq mi (102.07 km^{2})
  - Land: 39.233 sq mi (101.61 km^{2})
  - Water: 0.176 sq mi (0.46 km^{2}) 0.45%

Population (2020)
  - Total: 11,215
  - Density: 285.86/sq mi (110.37/km^{2})
- Time zone: UTC-6 (CST)
  - Summer (DST): UTC-5 (CDT)
- Area code: 913

Fairmount Township is a township in Leavenworth County, Kansas, United States. It is included statistically in the Kansas City metropolitan area. As of the 2020 census, its population was 11,215. It is the largest township in Leavenworth County in terms of population. The entirety of Basehor, Kansas is located in the township.

== Geography ==
Fairmount Township covers an area of 39.409 square miles (102.07 square kilometers).

=== Communities ===
- Basehor
- Fairmount

=== Adjacent townships ===
- High Prairie Township, Leavenworth County (northwest)
- Delaware Township, Leavenworth County (northeast)
- Sherman Township, Leavenworth County (south)
- Stranger Township, Leavenworth County (west)

=== Major highways ===
- K-32
- I-70
- US-40
- US-24
- US-73
