= Alexandria Township, Kansas =

Township in Leavenworth County, Kansas, U.S.

Alexandria Township
- Township
- Location in Leavenworth County
- Coordinates: 39°16′6″N 95°7′33″W
- Country: United States
- State: Kansas
- County: Leavenworth

Area
  - Total: 48.078 sq mi (124.52 km^{2})
  - Land: 47.538 sq mi (123.12 km^{2})
  - Water: 0.54 sq mi (1.4 km^{2}) 1.12%

Population (2020)
  - Total: 871
  - Density: 18.3/sq mi (7.07/km^{2})
- Time zone: UTC-6 (CST)
  - Summer (DST): UTC-5 (CDT)
- Area code: 913

Alexandria Township is a township in Leavenworth County, Kansas, United States. As of the 2020 census, its population was 871.

== Geography ==
Alexandria Township covers an area of 48.078 square miles (124.52 square kilometers).

=== Communities ===
- Springdale

=== Adjacent townships ===
- Easton Township, Leavenworth County (north)
- Kickapoo Township, Leavenworth County (northeast)
- High Prairie Township, Leavenworth County (east)
- Stranger Township, Leavenworth County (southeast)
- Tonganoxie Township, Leavenworth County (south)
- Union Township, Jefferson County (southwest)
- Jefferson Township, Jefferson County (northwest)

=== Major highways ===
- K-92
