= Lenape (disambiguation) =

Lenape are a Native American people.

Lenape may also refer to:

- Lenape, Kansas, an unincorporated community in Leavenworth County
- Lenape, Pennsylvania, an unincorporated community in Chester County
- Lenape potato, a potato variety
- Lenape High School, which is in New Jersey
- Lenape Middle School, Doylestown, Pennsylvania
- USS Lenape (ID-2700) was a troop transport for the United States Navy in 1918, during World War I

== See also ==
- Lenape Heights, a census-designated place (CDP) in Armstrong County, Pennsylvania, United States.
