= Delaware Township, Leavenworth County, Kansas =

Township in Leavenworth County, Kansas, U.S.

Delaware Township
- Township
- Location in Leavenworth County
- Coordinates: 39°15′47″N 94°51′48″W
- Country: United States
- State: Kansas
- County: Leavenworth

Area
  - Total: 20.935 sq mi (54.22 km^{2})
  - Land: 19.873 sq mi (51.47 km^{2})
  - Water: 1.062 sq mi (2.75 km^{2}) 5.07%

Population (2020)
  - Total: 1,061
  - Density: 53.39/sq mi (20.61/km^{2})
- Time zone: UTC-6 (CST)
  - Summer (DST): UTC-5 (CDT)
- Area code: 913

Delaware Township is a township in Leavenworth County, Kansas, United States. As of the 2020 census, its population was 1,061.

== Geography ==
Delaware Township covers an area of 20.935 square miles (54.22 square kilometers).

=== Adjacent townships ===
- Lee Township, Platte County, Missouri (northeast)
- Waldron Township, Platte County, Missouri (southeast)
- Fairmount Township, Leavenworth County (south)
- High Prairie Township, Leavenworth County (west)

=== Major highways ===
- K-5
- US-73
