= K-92 (Kansas highway) =

State highway in Kansas, U.S.

K-92
- K-92 highlighted in red

Route information
- Maintained by KDOT and the city of Leavenworth
- Length: 44.061 mi (70.909 km)
- Existed: 1926–present

Major junctions
- West end: K-4 south of Rock Creek
- US-59 / K-16 in Oskaloosa; US-73 / K-7 in Leavenworth
- East end: Route 92 at the Missouri border in Leavenworth

Location
- Country: United States
- State: Kansas
- Counties: Jefferson, Leavenworth

Highway system
- Kansas State Highway System; Interstate; US; State; Spurs
← K-90	→ K-93

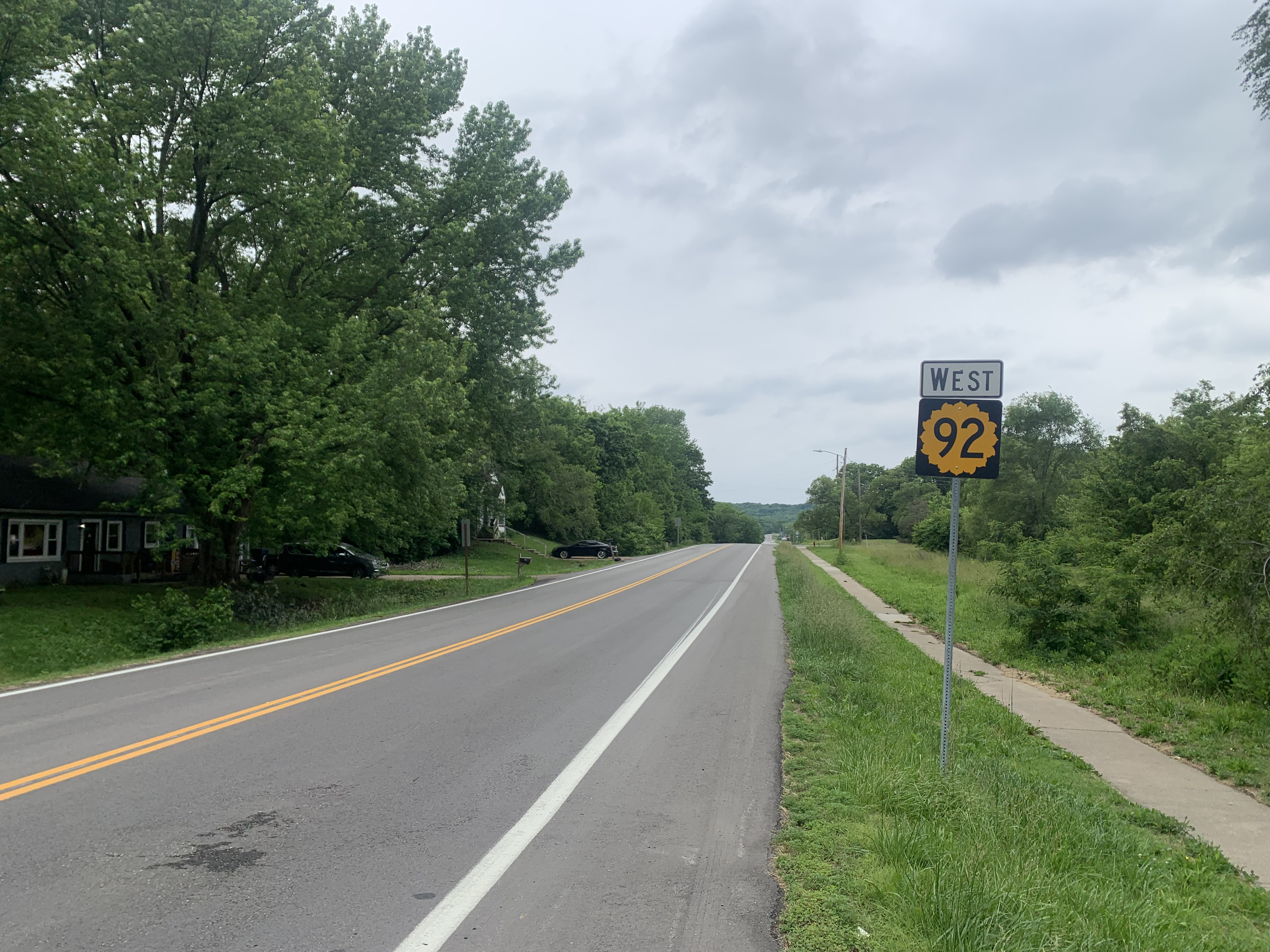
Kansas Highway 92 in western Leavenworth, Kansas

K-92 is an approximately 44-mile-long (71 km) state highway in the U.S. state of Kansas. K-92's western terminus is at K-4 south of the community of Rock Creek, and the eastern terminus is a continuation as Missouri State Route 92 at the Missouri border by the City of Leavenworth. K-92 is co-designated as U.S. Route 59 (US-59) in Oskaloosa, K-16 from Oskaloosa to McLouth, and K-7 and US-73 in Leavenworth. The majority of the route passes through rural farmland and is almost entirely a two-lane roadway, except for the overlap with K-7 and US-73 and a portion of the US-59 overlap, which are four-lane.

In the 1850s, a military road was built connecting Fort Riley with Fort Leavenworth, which K-92 follows or closely follows. Before state highways were numbered in Kansas there were auto trails. K-92's western terminus (K-4) was part of the former Southwest Trail. The section of the highway that overlaps K-7 and US-73 closely follows or was part of the George Washington National Highway and former King of Trails. The section of K-92 that overlaps with US-59 was part of the former Southwest Trail and former Corn Belt Route. K-92 was first designated as a state highway in 1926. At that time it began at K-16 south of Oskaloosa and ran east to the Missouri border. Between 1931 and 1932, the highway was extended further west to end at K-4 south of Rock Creek. In the mid 1950s, K-92 was realigned in Leavenworth to cross the new bridge over the Missouri River. In the mid 1960s, the highway was rerouted slightly to make room for Perry Lake, which was being constructed by the US Army Corps of Engineers.

== Route description ==
K-92's western terminus is at K-4 south of the community of Rock Creek, and the eastern terminus is a continuation as Missouri State Route 92 at the Missouri border by the City of Leavenworth. The majority of the route passes through rural areas and is almost entirely a two-lane roadway, except for the overlap with K-7 and US-73, and a portion of the US-59 overlap, which are four-lane. The Kansas Department of Transportation (KDOT) tracks the traffic levels on its highways, and in 2017, they determined that on average the traffic varied from 1,560 vehicles per day slightly west of Leavenworth, 12,700 vehicles per day along the overlap with US-73 and K-7, to 12,800 vehicles per day slightly west of the Missouri border. The only section of K-92 included in the National Highway System is its overlap with US-73 and K-7. The National Highway System is a system of highways important to the nation's defense, economy, and mobility. K-92 also connects to the National Highway System at its western terminus, K-4. All but 2.7 miles (4.3 km) of K-92's alignment is maintained by KDOT. Leavenworth maintains the highway from 1.462 miles (2.353 km) west of US-73 and K-7 to the eastern end of the overlap with US-73 and K-7. Most of K-92 is a two-lane roadway, except for the overlap with K-7 and US-73 and a portion of the US-59 overlap, which are four-lane.

=== Jefferson County ===
K-92 begins at K-4 south of Rock Creek and begins travelling east through flat lands with scattered houses. After about 3.6 miles (5.8 km) it passes through the south end of Ozawkie. As the highway exits the city it begins to cross the causeway across Perry Lake. At the other side, the highway curves northeast and crosses Fishpond Creek roughly 1.6 miles (2.6 km) later. K-92 curves back east, crosses Little Slough Creek, then shifts south slightly. The highway advances east for roughly 1.6 miles (2.6 km) through rolling hills, then curves southeast and crosses Slough Creek. The road continues about 0.75 miles (1.21 km) then curves east and enters Oskaloosa as Jefferson Street. After roughly 0.85 miles (1.37 km) the roadway intersects K-16 and US-59 (Walnut Street). At this point, K-92 turns south and begins to overlap K-16 and US-59 for roughly 0.5 miles (0.80 km) then exits the city.

After about 0.5 miles (0.80 km), K-16 and K-92 turn east as US-59 continues south. K-92 and K-16 pass through mostly flat farmlands for about 2.9 miles (4.7 km) then curve south at Wellman Road. After roughly 0.4 miles (0.64 km) the highway curves back east. K-92 and K-16 continue east through flat rural farmlands for about two miles (3.2 km) then enters McLouth as Lake Street. After about 0.4 miles (0.64 km) K-92 turns north onto South Union Street, as K-16 continues east along Lake Street. K-92 then exits the city 0.5 miles (0.80 km) later. The highway advances north through mostly flat farmlands for roughly 3.45 miles (5.55 km) then crosses Prairie Creek. The road then curves east and crosses Prairie Creek again. K-92 passes through rolling hills with farmlands for one mile (1.6 km) then enters Leavenworth County.

=== Leavenworth County ===
K-92 advances through rural farmlands for about three miles (4.8 km) then passes through Springdale and curves northeast. After a short distance the road curves more east, just east of Yllier Lake. The highway briefly parallels Walnut Creek then intersects 227th Street, which was the former western terminus of K-292. K-92 crosses Stranger Creek and then dips south briefly before curving to the northeast. The road meanders northeastward through a mix of forested and open lands for about three miles (4.8 km) then curves east. The highway continues for about 0.75 miles (1.21 km) then crosses Rock Creek. K-92 continues east for about three miles (4.8 km) then shifts south slightly.

The roadway advances eastward through rural farmlands for roughly 0.7 miles (1.1 km) then curves northeast. The highway meanders northeast for about 1.8 miles (2.9 km) then curves east and enters Leavenworth as Spruce Street. K-92 continues through the city for about 2.3 miles (3.7 km) then intersects K-7 and US-73, also known as 4th Street. At this point K-92 turns north and begins to overlap K-7 and US-73. The highway soon crosses Three Mile Creek then reaches Metropolitan Avenue. Here, K-7 and US-73 curve turn west and K-92 turns east. K-92 continues east for a short distance then begins to cross the Centennial Bridge, which crosses a Union Pacific Railroad track and the Missouri River. About halfway across it enters into Missouri, where it continues as Missouri Route 92.

== History ==
=== Early roads ===
In a March 3, 1853, act of Congress, $11,125 (equivalent to $330,015 in 2024) was appropriated to build bridges and establish communications between Fort Leavenworth and Fort Riley. By 1857, $9,181 (equivalent to $243,045 in 2024) has been expended and to finish building bridges and excavation, a further $50,000 (equivalent to $1.32 million in 2024) was requested. In 1863, the Kansas territorial legislature passed a resolution for Congress to make provisions for improving the road from Fort Leavenworth via Fort Riley to Fort Larned. At that time, the road lacked bridges in places and at some times of the year was impassable, which caused delay to the US Military. Certain sections of K-92 closely follow the former military road, especially near Ozawkie and Oskaloosa.

Around 1910, a national system of auto trails was created in the United States as well as in Canada. K-92's western terminus (K-4) was part of the former Southwest Trail, which ran from El Paso to Chicago. The section of the highway that overlaps K-7 and US-73 closely follows or was part of the George Washington National Highway, which ran from Seattle east to Savannah, and former King of Trails, which ran from Galveston north to Winnipeg, Manitoba. The section of K-92 that overlaps with US-59 was part of the former Southwest Trail and former Corn Belt Route, which began south of Marysville and traveled east to Bonner Springs.

=== Establishment and realignments ===
K-92 was first designated as a state highway in 1926. At that time it began at K-16 south of Oskaloosa and ran east to Leavenworth. It then overlapped K-5 (modern K-7) for a short distance then continued east to the Missouri border. By 1927, K-16 became US-73W and K-5 became US-73E. Between 1931 and 1932, the highway was extended further west to end at K-4 south of Rock Creek. Also by 1932, K-24 was extended from Valley Falls along K-4 to US-73W, then south along US-73W to K-92, then east along K-92. K-24 then left K-92 and went southward and ended in Tonganoxie. Sometime between April 1933 and 1934, US-73W was renumbered to US-59 and US-73E was renumbered to US-73. Between 1934 and 1936, K-24 was renumbered to K-16 to avoid confusion with US-24, which had been extended into Kansas. In a January 28, 1941 resolution, K-92 was realigned by Ozawkie to eliminate two turns and to fix some sharp curves. K-16, K-92 and US-59 originally followed Cherokee Street in Rock Creek. Then in a November 18, 1953 resolution, K-16, K-92 and US-59 was realigned slightly east onto Walnut Street. By 1966 the U.S. Army Corps of Engineers had begun building Perry Lake. Then in a November 9, 1966 resolution, a roughly 4.5 miles (7.2 km) section of K-92 was realigned to make room for the new reservoir.

The former crossing of the Missouri River was located slightly north of the current bridge. It was opened in 1872, and known as the Fort Bridge. In a March 24, 1954 resolution, it was approved to realign K-92 in Leavenworth to cross the new bridge being built over the Missouri River. The Centennial Bridge opened with a ribbon-cutting ceremony on April 2, 1955. Five thousand were in attendance to see Representative William R. Hull of Missouri and Senator Frank Carlson of Kansas cut the ribbon. The bridge cost $3.5 million (equivalent to $319 million in 2024) to build and opened as a toll road to repay bonds used to finance the construction. Tolls were initially set at $0.15 for passenger cars and $0.15 per axle for trucks (equivalent to $2.00 in 2025). A plaque on one of the piers read "A memorial dedicated to those who gave their lives to their country, 1854–1954." Six and a half miles of new road and bridge was needed to connect to Metropolitan Avenue in Leavenworth on the Kansas side and the existing section of Missouri Route 92 on the Missouri side.

== Major intersections ==
County	Location	mi	km	Destinations	Notes
Jefferson	Rock Creek Township	0.000	0.000	K-4 – Topeka, Valley Falls	Western terminus
Jefferson	Oskaloosa	12.738	20.500	US-59 north / K-16 west (Walnut Street) – Atchison	Western terminus of US-54/K-16 concurrency
Jefferson	Oskaloosa Township	13.698	22.045	US-59 south – Lawrence	Eastern terminus of US-54 concurrency
Jefferson	McLouth	19.609	31.558	K-16 east (Lake Street) – Tonganoxie	Eastern terminus of K-16 concurrency
Leavenworth				227th Street	Western terminus of former K-292
Leavenworth	Leavenworth	42.401	68.238	US-73 south / K-7 south (4th Street) – Bonner Springs	Western terminus of US-73/K-7 concurrency
Leavenworth	Leavenworth	43.640	70.232	US-73 north / K-7 north (Metropolitan Avenue) – Atchison, Fort Leavenworth	Eastern terminus of US-73/K-7 concurrency
Leavenworth	Leavenworth	44.061	70.909	Route 92 east	Continuation at the Missouri border; (Centennial Bridge over Missouri River)
1.000 mi = 1.609 km; 1.000 km = 0.621 mi: Concurrency terminus
