= High Prairie Township, Kansas =

Township in Leavenworth County, Kansas, U.S.

High Prairie Township
- Township
- Location in Leavenworth County
- Coordinates: 39°15′24″N 95°0′57″W
- Country: United States
- State: Kansas
- County: Leavenworth

Area
  - Total: 47.5 sq mi (123 km^{2})
  - Land: 47.368 sq mi (122.68 km^{2})
  - Water: 0.132 sq mi (0.34 km^{2}) 0.28%

Population (2020)
  - Total: 2,014
  - Density: 42.52/sq mi (16.42/km^{2})
- Time zone: UTC-6 (CST)
  - Summer (DST): UTC-5 (CDT)
- Area code: 913

High Prairie Township is a township in Leavenworth County, Kansas, United States. As of the 2020 census, its population was 2,014.

== Geography ==
High Prairie Township covers an area of 47.5 square miles (123 square kilometers).

=== Adjacent townships ===
- Kickapoo Township, Leavenworth County (north)
- Delaware Township, Leavenworth County (east)
- Fairmount Township, Leavenworth County (southeast)
- Stranger Township, Leavenworth County (south)
- Tonganoxie Township, Leavenworth County (southwest)
- Alexandria Township, Leavenworth County (west)
- Easton Township, Leavenworth County (northwest)

=== Major highways ===
- K-92
