= Bill Burwell =

American baseball player, coach, and manager (1895–1973)

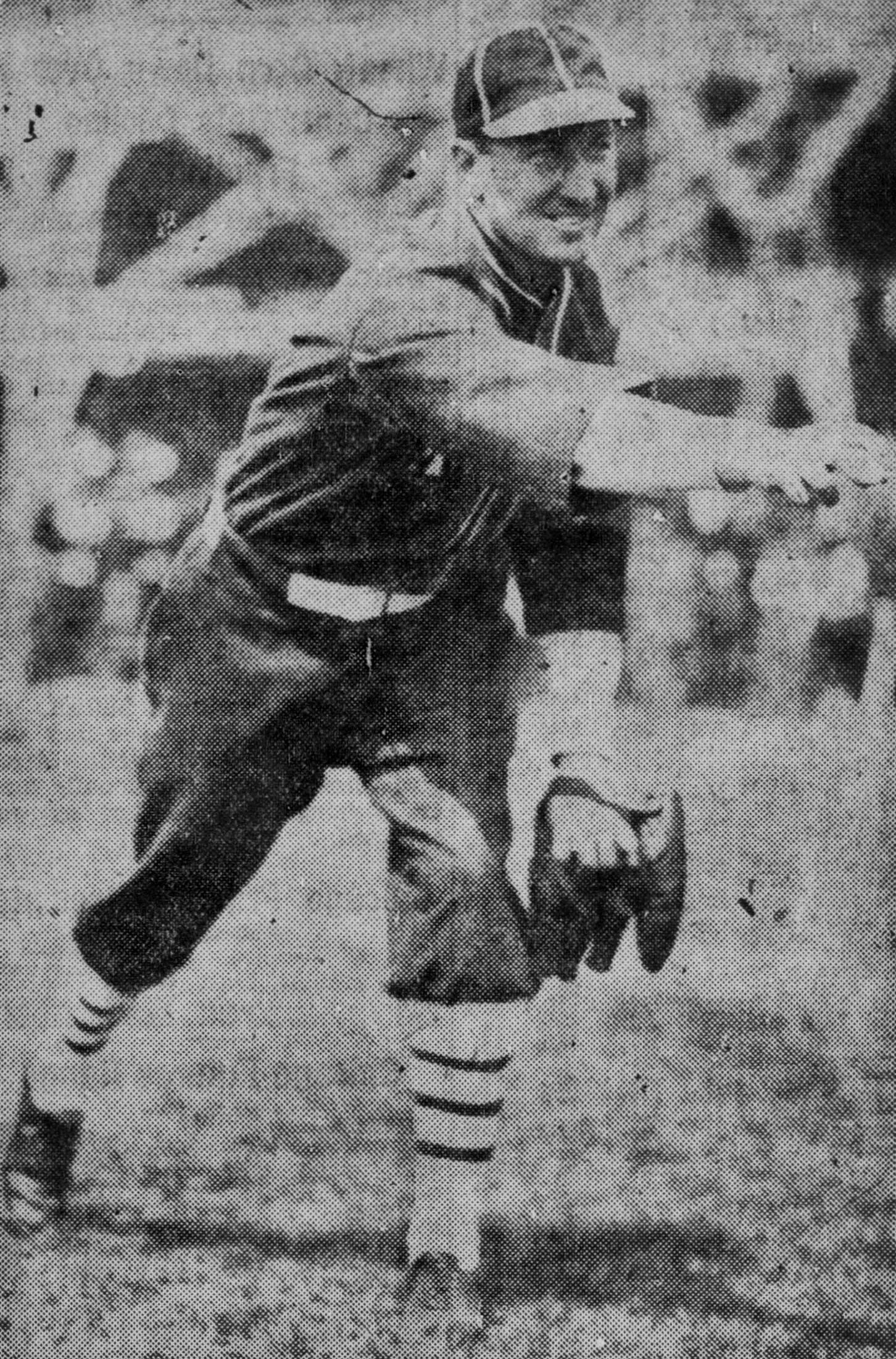
- Burwell, circa 1934
- Pitcher / Manager
- Born: March 27, 1895; Jarbalo, Kansas, U.S.
- Died: June 11, 1973 (aged 78); Ormond Beach, Florida, U.S.
- Batted: Left Threw: Right

MLB debut
- May 1, 1920, for the St. Louis Browns

Last MLB appearance
- July 1, 1928, for the Pittsburgh Pirates

MLB statistics
- Win–loss record: 9–8
- Earned run average: 4.37
- Strikeouts: 49
- Managerial record: 1–0
- Winning percentage: 1.000
- Stats at Baseball Reference

Teams
- As player: St. Louis Browns (1920–1921); Pittsburgh Pirates (1928); As manager: Pittsburgh Pirates (1947)

Career highlights and awards
- World Series champion (1960)

William Edwin Burwell (March 27, 1895 – June 11, 1973) was an American professional baseball player, manager and coach. Born in Jarbalo, Kansas, Burwell was a right-handed pitcher who stood 5 feet 11 inches (1.80 m) tall and weighed 175 pounds (79 kg).

== World War I service ==
In 1917, Burwell was drafted into the United States Army. During the Battle of Saint-Mihiel in 1918, Burwell volunteered for the dangerous mission of attacking German machine gun nests, and his pitching hand was injured by a bullet. One of his fingers was shattered and the tip of the finger was lost, causing his fingers to have a slight curl. He'd discover after his hand healed that he could throw a sinker.

== Pitching career ==
Burwell won 239 minor league games during a 22-year playing career (1915–17, 1919–35, 1937–38). He pitched for all or parts of 12 straight seasons, between 1923 and 1934, for the Indianapolis Indians of the American Association.

In Major League Baseball, he appeared in 66 career games for the 1920–21 St. Louis Browns and four contests for the 1928 Pittsburgh Pirates. In his 70 MLB games, six as a starting pitcher, he won nine games and lost eight, with a 4.37 earned run average. He posted six saves and one complete game, allowing 253 hits and 79 bases on balls, with 49 strikeouts, in 2181/3 innings pitched.

== As manager and coach ==
He also fashioned a lengthy post-pitching career as a minor league manager (including two seasons, 1945–46, as skipper of the Indianapolis franchise) and Major League coach. He worked in the latter role for the Boston Red Sox (1944) and Pittsburgh Pirates (1947–48; 1958–62). While serving as pitching coach on Danny Murtaugh's staff, Burwell was a member of the Pirates' 1960 world championship team.

Burwell was acting manager of the Pirates for the final game of the 1947 season, after player-manager Billy Herman resigned with one game remaining. Under Burwell, the Pirates defeated the Cincinnati Reds, 7–0. He also was a longtime scout and roving minor league coach for the Pirates.

While working as pitching instructor in the Pirate organization in 1949, Burwell was instrumental to the development of pitcher Vern Law, then toiling for the Class B Davenport Pirates of the Illinois–Indiana–Iowa League. Burwell taught the 19-year-old Law how to change speeds and throw the change-up. Law — winner of the 1960 Cy Young Award as the top pitcher in the majors — later cited Burwell as the coach who most helped him during his time in the minor leagues.

Burwell died at age 78 in Ormond Beach, Florida, and is buried in nearby Daytona Beach.

| Preceded by Tom Daly | Boston Red Sox third-base coach 1944 | Succeeded by Del Baker |
| Preceded by N/A | Pittsburgh Pirates pitching coach 1958–1962 | Succeeded by Don Osborn |
