= Malik Benson =

American football player (born 2002)

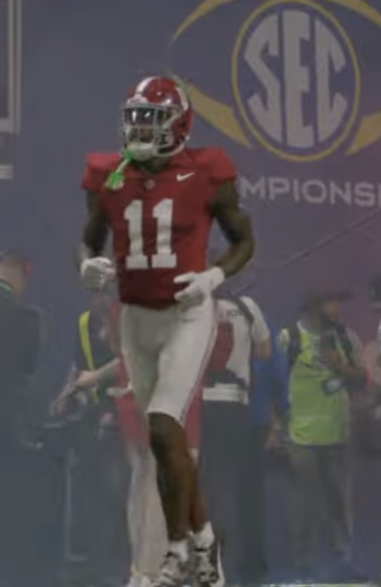
- Benson in 2023

No. 19 – Las Vegas Raiders
- Positions: Wide receiver, punt returner
- Roster status: Active

Personal information
- Born: October 17, 2002 (age 24)
- Listed height: 6 ft 1 in (1.85 m)
- Listed weight: 195 lb (88 kg)

Career information
- High school: Lansing (Lansing, Kansas)
- College: Hutchinson (2021–2022); Alabama (2023); Florida State (2024); Oregon (2025)
- NFL draft: 2026: 6th round, 195th overall pick

Career history
- Las Vegas Raiders (2026–present)

Career NFL statistics as of Week 7, 2026
- Receptions: 2
- Receiving yards: 12
- Stats at Pro Football Reference

Malik Benson (born October 17, 2002) is an American professional football wide receiver and punt returner for the Las Vegas Raiders of the National Football League (NFL). He played college football for Hutchinson Community College, the Alabama Crimson Tide, Florida State Seminoles, and Oregon Ducks. Benson was selected by the Raiders in the sixth round of the 2026 NFL draft.

== Early life ==
Benson attended Lansing High School in Lansing, Kansas. During his high school career, he had 1,119 receiving yards and 11 touchdowns.

== College career ==
Benson attended Hutchinson Community College for two years. He had 43 receptions for 1,229 yards and 11 touchdowns as a freshman and 54 receptions for 923 receiving yards and 10 touchdowns as a sophomore. The 2,152 receiving yards was a school record.

Benson was considered the top junior college recruit in 2023 and committed to play for the University of Alabama.

On January 3, 2024, Benson announced that he would be entering the transfer portal. He committed to Florida State University four days later.

After announcing that the NCAA had granted him an additional year of eligibility, on January 7, 2025, Benson announced his intention to transfer to the University of Oregon.

=== College statistics ===
Year	Team	Receiving					Rushing		
Year	Team	GP	Rec	Yds	Avg	TD	Att	Yds	TD
2023	Alabama	14	13	162	12.5	1	0	0	0
2024	Florida State	12	25	311	12.4	1	2	2	0
2025	Oregon	14	41	696	17.0	6	1	-4	0
Career		31	54	1,169	14.8	9	3	-2	0

== Professional career ==
Pre-draft measurables
Height	Weight	Arm length	Hand span	Wingspan	40-yard dash	10-yard split	20-yard split	20-yard shuttle	Three-cone drill	Vertical jump	Broad jump
6 ft 0 1/8 in (1.83 m)	189 lb (86 kg)	31 7/8 in (0.81 m)	8 5/8 in (0.22 m)	6 ft 6 1/8 in (1.98 m)	4.37 s	1.55 s	2.59 s	4.45 s	7.12 s	32.5 in (0.83 m)	10 ft 2 in (3.10 m)
All values from NFL Combine/Pro Day

Benson was selected by the Las Vegas Raiders in the sixth round with the 195th overall pick of the 2026 NFL draft.
