= Kickapoo Township, Kansas =

Township in Leavenworth County, Kansas

Kickapoo Township
- Township
- Location in Leavenworth County
- Coordinates: 39°22′07″N 95°00′22″W
- Country: United States
- State: Kansas
- County: Leavenworth

Area
  - Total: 45.031 sq mi (116.63 km^{2})
  - Land: 44.119 sq mi (114.27 km^{2})
  - Water: 0.912 sq mi (2.36 km^{2}) 2.03%

Population (2020)
  - Total: 1,763
  - Density: 39.96/sq mi (15.43/km^{2})
- Time zone: UTC-6 (CST)
  - Summer (DST): UTC-5 (CDT)
- Area code: 913

Kickapoo Township is a township in Leavenworth County, Kansas, United States. As of the 2020 census, its population was 1,763.

== History ==
The township was named after the Kickapoo people.

== Geography ==
Kickapoo Township covers an area of 45.031 square miles (116.63 square kilometers).

=== Communities ===
- Kickapoo

=== Adjacent townships ===
- Walnut Township, Atchison County (north)
- Weston Township, Platte County, Missouri (northwest)
- High Prairie Township, Leavenworth County (south)
- Alexandria Township, Leavenworth County (southwest)
- Easton Township, Leavenworth County (west)

=== Major highways ===
- US-73
- K-192
