= Kickapoo Township =

Kickapoo Township may refer to:

- Kickapoo Township, Peoria County, Illinois
- Kickapoo Township, Leavenworth County, Kansas
- Kickapoo Township, Platte County, Missouri
- Kickapoo Township, Kidder County, North Dakota
- Kickapoo Township, Mountrail County, North Dakota in Mountrail County, North Dakota
- Kickapoo Township, a township in Lincoln County, Oklahoma

== See also ==
- Kickapoo (disambiguation)
