= Tonganoxie Township, Kansas =

Township in Leavenworth County, Kansas, U.S.

Tonganoxie Township
- Township
- Location in Leavenworth County
- Coordinates: 39°08′12″N 95°08′29″W
- Country: United States
- State: Kansas
- County: Leavenworth

Area
  - Total: 53.421 sq mi (138.36 km^{2})
  - Land: 53.095 sq mi (137.52 km^{2})
  - Water: 0.326 sq mi (0.84 km^{2}) 0.61%

Population (2020)
  - Total: 5,998
  - Density: 113.0/sq mi (43.62/km^{2})
- Time zone: UTC-6 (CST)
  - Summer (DST): UTC-5 (CDT)
- Area code: 913

Tonganoxie Township is a township in Leavenworth County, Kansas, United States, which is included statistically in the Kansas City metropolitan area. As of the 2020 census, the population of the township was 5,998. Almost all of the city limits of Tonganoxie are located in the township as well.

== History ==
Tonganoxie Township was platted in 1866, similar to the City of Tonganoxie. It was named for local Native American Chief Tonganoxie from the Delaware tribe.

== Geography ==
Tonganoxie Township covers an area of 53.421 square miles (138.36 square kilometers).

=== Communities ===
- part of Tonganoxie

=== Adjacent townships ===
- Alexandria Township, Leavenworth County (north)
- High Prairie Township, Leavenworth County (northeast)
- Stranger Township, Leavenworth County (east)
- Reno Township, Leavenworth County (south)
- Sarcoxie Township, Jefferson County (west)
- Union Township, Jefferson County (northwest)

=== Major highways ===
- US-40
- K-16
