= Hoge, Kansas =

Unincorporated community in Kansas, U.S.

Coordinates: 39°10′20″N 94°59′42″W

Hoge is an unincorporated community in Leavenworth County, Kansas, United States. It is part of the Kansas City metropolitan area.

== History ==
A post office was established as Hoge Station in 1868 by Joseph Hoge, for whom the community was named. The post office closed in 1901.
