= Lansing High School (Kansas) =

Location
- 1412 147th Street; Lansing, Kansas 66048; United States; 39°14′34″N 94°53′40″W

Information
- Funding type: Public
- Opened: 1920
- Status: Open
- School board: BOE website
- School district: Lansing USD 469
- Principal: Alan Penrose
- Teaching staff: 46.10 (FTE)
- Grades: 9–12
- Gender: coed
- Enrollment: 876 (2023–2024)
- Student to teacher ratio: 19.00
- Colors: Scarlet; White
- Athletics conference: United Kansas Conference
- Mascot: Lion
- Team name: Lansing Lions
- Website: School website

Lansing High School is a public high school in Lansing, Kansas, United States, operated by Lansing USD 469 school district. It offers many extracurricular activities and athletic programs.

The district, of which this is the sole comprehensive high school, includes Lansing and a small southern section of Leavenworth.

== History ==
Established in 1920, the school has a long and storied history. The current building opened in 2015.

== Extracurricular activities ==
=== Athletics ===
Lansing offers a variety of athletic programs and are referred to as the "Lions". The school is a member of the Kansas State High School Activities Association and athletic programs compete at the 5A level in the United Kansas Conference. In 2014 the Lansing boys' basketball team won the state championship.

Sports offered at Lansing High School include:

Fall sports

- Cross country
- Football
- Soccer (boys')
- Tennis (girls')
- Volleyball

Winter sports

- Basketball
- Bowling
- Swimming (boys')
- Wrestling

Spring sports

- Baseball
- Golf
- Soccer (girls')
- Softball
- Swimming (girls')
- Tennis (boys')
- Track and field

== Notable alumni ==
- Malik Benson, college football wide receiver
- Doug Lamborn (1972), current Republican Representative of Colorado's 5th congressional district, serving since 2007

== See also ==
- List of high schools in Kansas
- List of unified school districts in Kansas
