= Delaware City, Kansas =

Extinct town in northeast Kansas, U.S.

Coordinates: 39°13′45″N 94°51′01″W

Delaware City is a ghost town in Leavenworth County, Kansas, United States.

== History ==
Delaware City was platted in 1854. It was first settled by L.F. Hollingsworth, George Quinby, William H. Spratt, James Bruce, J. M. Churchhill, C. C. Redmon, and others. Delaware City was the former site of the University of Saint Mary. A post office called Delaware City was established in 1856, and remained in operation until it was discontinued in 1878.

== See also ==
- List of ghost towns in Kansas
