= U.S. Route 73 =

Numbered Highway in Kansas and Nebraska in the United States

U.S. Route 73
- US 73 highlighted in red

Route information
- Maintained by KDOT, NDOT, and the cities of Leavenworth, Atchison and Horton
- Length: 113.17 mi (Note: Mileage is a summation of each state's length) (182.13 km)
- Existed: 1926–present
- Tourist routes: Lewis and Clark Trail

Major junctions
- South end: I-70 / Kansas Turnpike / US-24 / US-40 / K-7 in Bonner Springs, KS
- K-7 in Atchison, KS; US-59 in Atchison, KS; US-36 in Hiawatha, KS
- North end: US 75 in Dawson, NE

Location
- Country: United States
- States: Kansas, Nebraska
- Counties: KS: Wyandotte, Leavenworth, Atchison, Brown; NE: Richardson

Highway system
- United States Numbered Highway System; List; Special; Divided
| ← US 72 | → US 74 |

U.S. Route 73 (US 73) is a north–south United States highway that runs for 113 miles (182 km) from northeast Kansas to southeast Nebraska. The highway's southern terminus is Bonner Springs, Kansas at I-70. Its northern terminus is near Dawson, Nebraska at US 75.

== Route description ==
Lengths
| | mi | km |
|---|---|---|
| KS | 91.120 | 146.643 |
| NE | 22.05 | 35.49 |
| Total | 113.17 | 182.13 |

=== Kansas ===
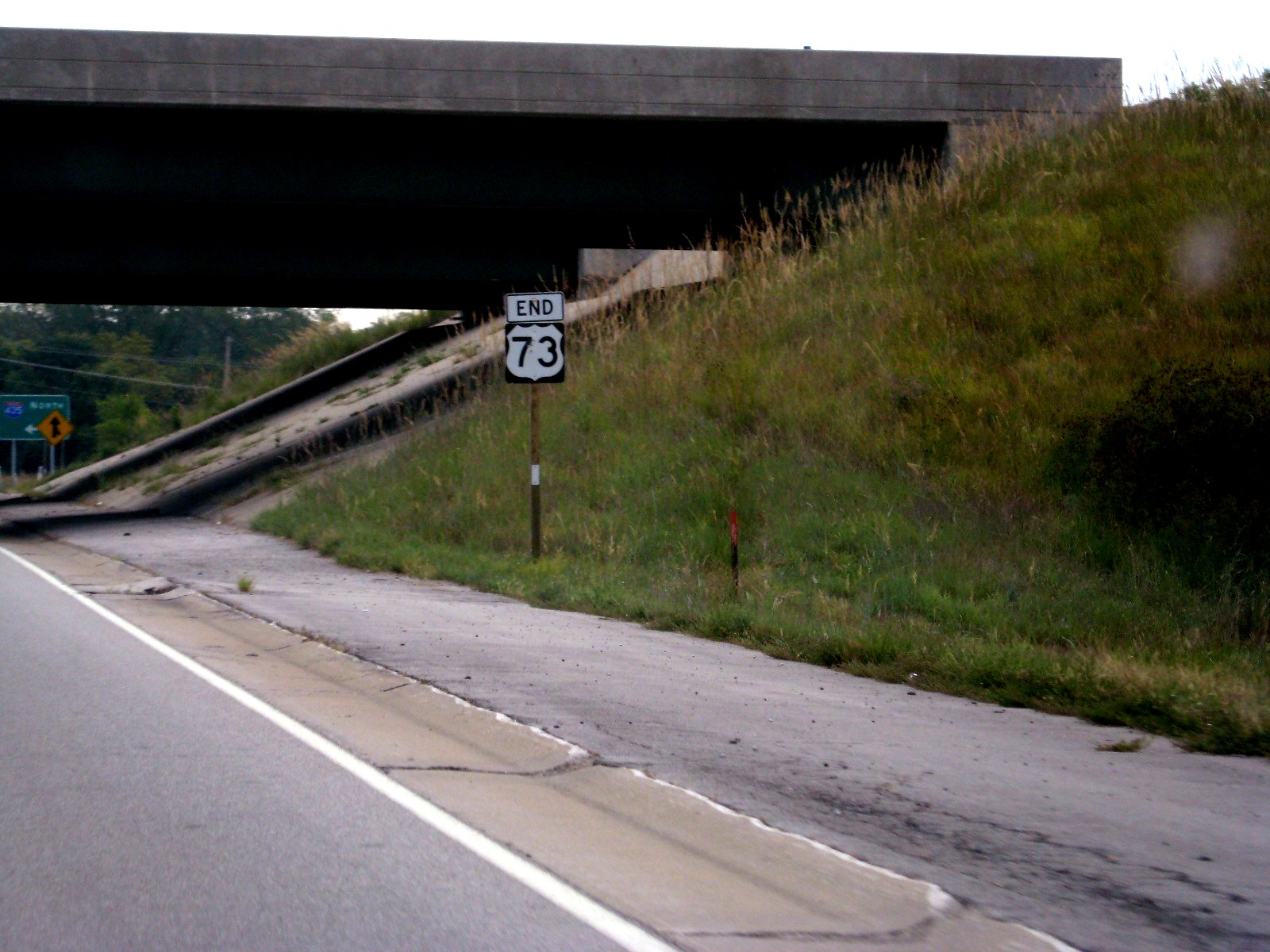
US-73's former southern terminus at I-435 in Kansas City in 2007.

U.S. Route 73 begins at I-70 in Kansas City in a concurrency with U.S. Route 24, U.S. Route 40, and K-7. Two miles north of its terminus, US 24 and US 40 turn west, while US 73 continues north with K-7. It continues north with K-7 through Lansing, where it intersects K-5. US 73 and K-7 then continue through Leavenworth. It goes northwesterly from Leavenworth, meeting K-192 near Easton and at Atchison, turns west. At Atchison, it loses K-7 and is briefly concurrent with U.S. Route 59. It goes west and turns northwest near Lancaster at its intersection with K-9. It goes through Huron and begins a concurrency with K-20 near Everest. It goes west into Horton and intersects U.S. Route 159. The two highways continue north together and meet U.S. Route 36 at Hiawatha. After a brief northwesterly routing through Reserve, US 73 and US 159 turn north and enter Nebraska.

=== Nebraska ===
U.S. Routes 73 and 159 enter Nebraska northwest of Reserve, Kansas. U.S. Route 159 turns east in Falls City, Nebraska toward Rulo, Nebraska and continues east toward Interstate 29 in Missouri. A few miles north of Falls City, U.S. Route 73 turns west, passes through Verdon, and ends at U.S. Route 75 just north of Dawson, Nebraska.

== History ==
The original southern terminus was at Atoka, Oklahoma at an intersection with U.S. Highway 75. From the creation of the highway in 1926 until April 11, 1935, US 73 was split between Oswego, Kansas and Horton, Kansas. US 73E followed modern US 160 from Oswego to Columbus, then modern US 69 to Kansas City, where it then latched onto what is now US 73. The US 73E designated then went from Kansas City to Horton. US 73W followed the route of modern U.S. Route 59 from Oswego to K-39, K-39 west to Chanute, modern U.S. Route 169 from Chanute to Garnett, modern US 59 again from Garnett to Nortonville, and then modern U.S. Route 159 from Nortonville to Horton. On April 10, 1935, US 73 was truncated at Kansas City with the modern designations taking over the old routes and US 69 taking over the Atoka-Oswego segment. In Kansas City, US 73 previously followed U.S. Route 24 into downtown Kansas City, Kansas, terminating at the Intercity Viaduct (Lewis and Clark Viaduct), before Interstate 435 was completed. After I-435 was completed, US 73 ended at its intersection with I-435. On December 1, 2008, the southern terminus was rerouted, along with US 24 and US 40, southward along K-7 to its new terminus at I-70.

Nebraska also had a split highway, with the split between Tekamah and Winnebago between 1935 and 1957. US 73E went north through Decatur along the current route of U.S. Route 75, while US 73W went west from Tekamah along current Nebraska Highway 32 to Oakland, then north from Oakland in a concurrency with U.S. Route 77.

The original northern terminus was south of Auburn, Nebraska, near Howe, Nebraska. US 73 went east through Howe, then south to Stella, Nebraska, then east through Shubert, Nebraska, then south to the current highway. In 1932, the highway was extended to South Sioux City, Nebraska. In 1965, the route was shortened to Winnebago, Nebraska. In 1984, U.S. 75 was removed from western Iowa along Interstate 29 and placed on U.S. 73's route, superseding it through Omaha, Nebraska and truncating the highway to its present northern terminus near Dawson, Nebraska.

K-227
- Location: Atchison
- Existed: September 9, 1968–1980

K-227 was a highway in Kansas that was designated on September 9, 1968. K-227's southern terminus was at K-4 and U.S. Route 59 (US-59) in the city of Atchison and the northern terminus was at K-9 and US-73 in Atchison. In 1980, US-73 was realigned along K-227 and at that time K-227 was decommissioned.

== Major intersections ==
| State | County | Location | mi | km | Destinations | Notes |
|---|---|---|---|---|---|---|
| Kansas | Wyandotte | Bonner Springs | 0.000 | 0.000 | I-70 / Kansas Turnpike west / US-24 east / US-40 east / K-7 south – Olathe, Topeka, St. Louis | Southern end of US-24, US-40, and K-7 overlaps; exit 224 on I-70 |
| Kansas | Wyandotte | Bonner Springs–Kansas City line | 1.584 | 2.549 | US-24 west / US-40 west (State Avenue) / Lewis and Clark Trail | Interchange; northern end of US-24 and US-40 overlaps |
| Kansas | Leavenworth | Leavenworth | | | K-5 south – Leavenworth National Cemetery | |
| Kansas | Leavenworth | Leavenworth | | | K-92 west (Spruce Street) – McLouth | Southern end of K-92 overlap |
| Kansas | Leavenworth | Leavenworth | | | K-92 east / Frontier Military Historic Byway ends / Glacial Hills Scenic Byway begins – Platte City Mo. | Northern end of K-92 overlap |
| Kansas | Leavenworth | Leavenworth | | | CR 14 (Santa Fe Trail) / N. 20th Street | Interchange |
| Kansas | Leavenworth | Kickapoo Township | | | K-192 west – Easton | |
| Kansas | Atchison | Walnut Township | | | K-74 west – Potter | |
| Kansas | Atchison | Atchison | | | K-7 north (10th Street) / US-59 north / Lewis and Clark Trail / Glacial Hills Scenic Byway – Troy, St. Joseph Mo. | Northern end of K-7 overlap; southern end of US-59 overlap |
| Kansas | Atchison | Atchison | | | US-59 south – Oskaloosa | Northern end of US-59 overlap |
| Kansas | Atchison | Atchison | | | To K-7 north / Woodlawn Avenue – Amelia Earhart Airport | |
| Kansas | Atchison | Lancaster Township | | | K-9 west – Effingham | |
| Kansas | Brown | Washington Township | | | K-20 east – Everest | Southern end of K-20 overlap |
| Kansas | Brown | Horton | | | US-159 south – Muscotah | Southern end of US-159 overlap |
| Kansas | Brown | Horton | | | K-20 west to US-75 | Northern end of K-20 overlap |
| Kansas | Brown | Hiawatha | | | US-36 – Seneca, Troy | Interchange |
| | | | 91.12 0.00 | 146.64 0.00 | Lewis and Clark Trail begins; Kansas–Nebraska state line | |
| Nebraska | Richardson | Falls City | 4.11 | 6.61 | US 159 north (E. 14th Street) – Rulo | Northern end of US 159 overlap |
| Nebraska | Richardson | Falls City | 4.59 | 7.39 | N-8 west (21st Street) – Salem | |
| Nebraska | Richardson | Ohio Precinct–Liberty Precinct line | 13.49 | 21.71 | N-67 north – Indian Cave State Park | |
| Nebraska | Richardson | Grant Precinct | 22.05 | 35.49 | US 75 / Lewis and Clark Trail – Dawson, Omaha | |
1.000 mi = 1.609 km; 1.000 km = 0.621 mi: Concurrency terminus

== See also ==
- List of United States Numbered Highways

== Notes ==
Browse numbered routes
| ← K-71 | KS | → K-74 |
| ← N-71 | NE | → N-74 |
