= Millwood, Kansas =

Unincorporated community in Kansas, U.S.

Coordinates: 39°23′02″N 95°07′01″W

Millwood is an unincorporated community in Leavenworth County, Kansas, United States. It is part of the Kansas City metropolitan area.

== History ==
A post office was opened in Millwood in 1871, and remained in operation until it was discontinued in 1904.
