= Lowemont, Kansas =

Unincorporated community in Kansas, U.S.

- Unincorporated community
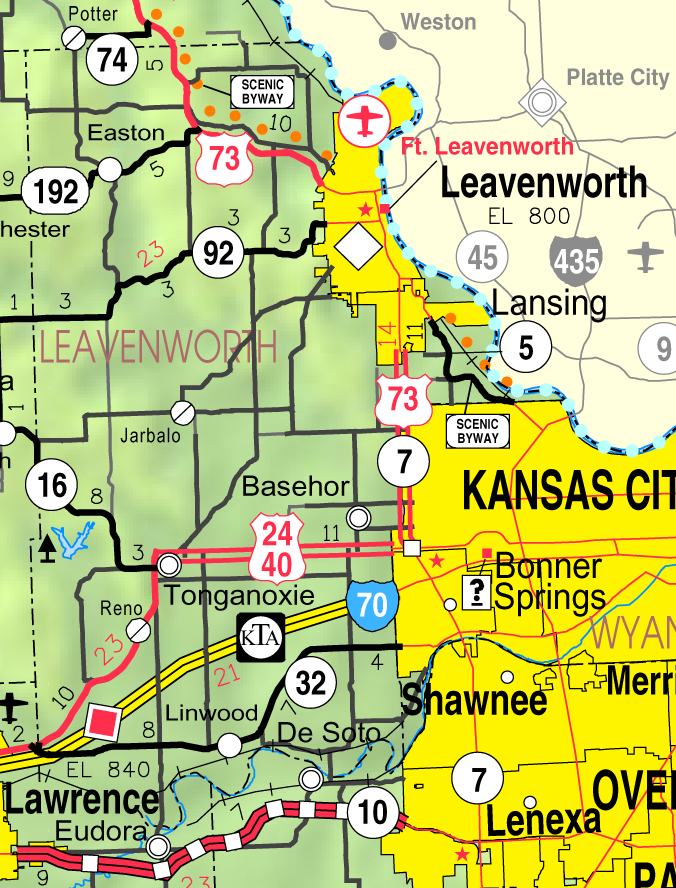
- KDOT map of Leavenworth County (legend)

- Location within Kansas Location within the United States
- Coordinates: 39°22′49.99″N 95°3′20.88″W
- Country: United States
- State: Kansas
- County: Leavenworth
- Founded: 1887
- Elevation: 1,109 ft (338 m)
- Time zone: UTC-6 (CST)
  - Summer (DST): UTC-5 (CDT)
- Area code: 913
- FIPS code: 20-43125
- GNIS ID: 478266

Lowemont is an unincorporated community in Leavenworth County, Kansas, United States. It is located northwest of Leavenworth along U.S. Route 73 highway, and part of the Kansas City metropolitan area.

== History ==
A post office was opened in Lowemont in 1888, and remained in operation until it was discontinued in 1938.
