= Lansing Man =

Hominin fossil

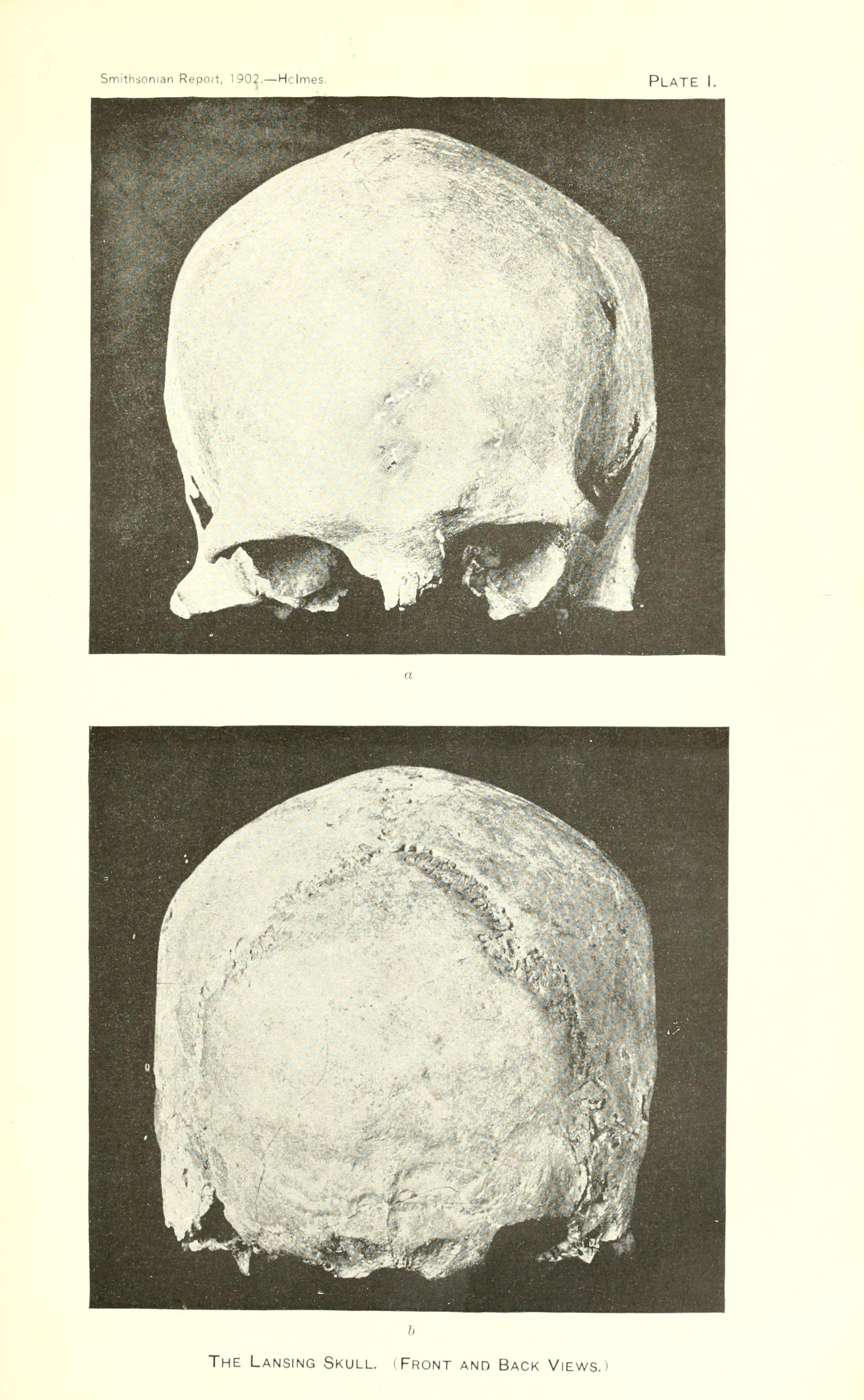
- The Lansing Skull
- Died: c. 3579 BC now Kansas, United States
- Body discovered: February 1902

Lansing Man is the name commonly given to a collection of human remains dug up in the loess banks of the Missouri River near Lansing, Kansas in February 1902. The remains were found in the process of digging a cellar tunnel for fruit storage on the farm of Martin Concannon. The human remains found consisted of a skull and several large bones from an adult male, as well as a child's mandible.

Further excavation was conducted by the Bureau of American Ethnology, and many archaeologists and geologists interested in the history and antiquity of man in America visited the site after its discovery. Thomas Chrowder Chamberlin was a notable geologist who put many efforts into examination of the Lansing Man site.

The remains were found beneath twenty feet of undisturbed deposits, and the geological strata in which the remains lay was dated to anywhere between 10,000 and 35,000 years old, predating the last ice age. The skull was well preserved, and its structure was nearly identical to that of Native Americans that previously inhabited the region.

== Controversy ==
The details pertaining to the discovery of Lansing Man created controversy over the antiquity of the remains. Depending on whether morphological or geological evidence was taken into account, different conclusions could be made about dating of the Lansing Man skeletal remains.

The geological strata in which the remains lay was dated to anywhere between 10,000 and 35,000 years old, predating the last ice age. From a geological dating standpoint, this evidence suggested that the skeletal remains dated back to the glacial period. This information would make the remains a significant finding on the grounds that the glacial period was a time when, previously, no humans were known to inhabit North America.

Observing the structure of the skull, its characteristics were nearly identical to that of the indigenous people of the region. From a morphological standpoint, scientists argued that it was highly unlikely that a species could last through an entire geological period (several thousands of years) without any evolutionary modifications or changes.

Based on this perspective, the significance of the remains was dismissed by most archaeologists as the skeletons were assumed by most not to be as old as the strata in which they were buried.

Currently, the Lansing Man remains belong to a curator of the Kansas City Museum, Mr. M. C. Long, whom had the remains carefully prepared and placed in the United States National Museum.

== Later findings ==
In 1973, further analysis was performed on the skeletal remains. William Bass, a staff member of the Department of Anthropology at the University of Tennessee, had Carbon-14 testing conducted on bones of the lower limbs at multiple laboratories. An average of the results from the testing dated the bones to 3579 B.C. These findings suggest that the remains are from the Early Middle Archaic, rather than the Paleoindian. Although the "Lansing Man" skeletal remains are not as old as some initially believed, they still remain the oldest human skeletons from Kansas.
