= Peruvian Connection =

Peruvian Connection Ltd.
- Type: Private
- Founded: 1976
- Founder: Biddy and Annie Hurlbut
- Headquarters: Tonganoxie, Kansas
- Number of locations: 8
- Products: sweaters dresses jackets coats skirts blankets shirts accessories jewelries home decor items
- Website: www.peruvianconnection.com

Peruvian Connection Ltd. is a United States–based retailer of high-end women’s clothing and accessories. Originally started as a mail-order catalog, the company also sells online and through eight retail stores.

== History ==
Peruvian Connection was founded in Kansas in 1976 by the mother and daughter team, Biddy and Annie Hurlbut. The impetus for the company grew out of trips Annie Hurlbut took to Peru. It was there that she bought a fitted sweater with an alpaca fur-lined collar for her mother’s 50th birthday. Biddy later showed the sweater to a local buyer, who wanted 45 more.

The business grew slowly but steadily until a style writer from The New York Times did an interview with Annie for what would turn out to be a quarter-page article in the paper's Style section. Within three months, Peruvian Connection had 5,000 requests for catalogs.

With continued growth in the late 1980s, Hurlbut and her mother opened outlet stores to sell excess inventory. Peruvian Connection now has retail stores in New York, New York; Washington, D.C.; Santa Fe, New Mexico; Aspen, Colorado; Kansas City, Missouri; Boston, Massachusetts; Chicago, Illinois and London, England. A United Kingdom fulfillment center was opened in 1996 to serve customers in the United Kingdom and Europe.

Today, the company has about 200 employees in the United States, South America and the U.K. Peruvian Connection catalogs are printed in English with prices in dollars or pounds sterling, and in German with pricing in euros. European orders are fulfilled through the United Kingdom branch, with call center operators speaking English or German.

Peruvian Connection is among Working Woman magazine's Working Women 500, a list of the largest women-run businesses, and is ranked among Internet Retailer’s Top 500 online retailers.

== Merchandise ==
Peruvian Connection focuses on women’s apparel made from the luxury fibers of alpaca and pima cotton. Most items are original designs produced by Peruvian Connection staff designers and handcrafted by artisans in Peru. "We continue to work with the same cottage industries," Hurlbut said. "Many of those have invested in their businesses; a lot are women-owned. We have relationships with our supplier base that go back 25 years, and we buy season after season from them."
