= Lenape, Kansas =

Unincorporated community in Kansas, U.S.

Coordinates: 38°59′50″N 94°57′03″W

Lenape is an unincorporated community in Leavenworth County, Kansas, United States.

== History ==
Lenape was founded in 1867 on the main line of the Kansas Pacific Railroad. The community was named after the Lenape Indians. A post office was established at Lenape in 1868, and remained in operation until it was discontinued in 1943. "McCoy labored with energy, zeal, and intelligence. Pine lumber was brought from Hannibal Missouri, and hard wood from Lenape, Kansas" to build Abilene so it could handle three thousand head of cattle (Webb pg 221).
