= Lansing USD 469 =

Public school district in Lansing, Kansas

Address
- 200 E. Mary St. Lansing, Kansas, 66043; United States
- Coordinates: 39°14′34″N 94°53′40″W

District information
- Type: Public
- Grades: PreK to 12
- Established: 1965
- Superintendent: Marty Kobza
- Schools: 4
- NCES District ID: 2008340

Students and staff
- Students: Approximately 2,700
- Teachers: 204
- Staff: 450
- Student–teacher ratio: 17:1
- Athletic conference: Unified Kansas League
- District mascot: Lions
- Colors: Scarlet; White

Other information
- Board of Education: Board webpage
- Website: usd469.socs.net

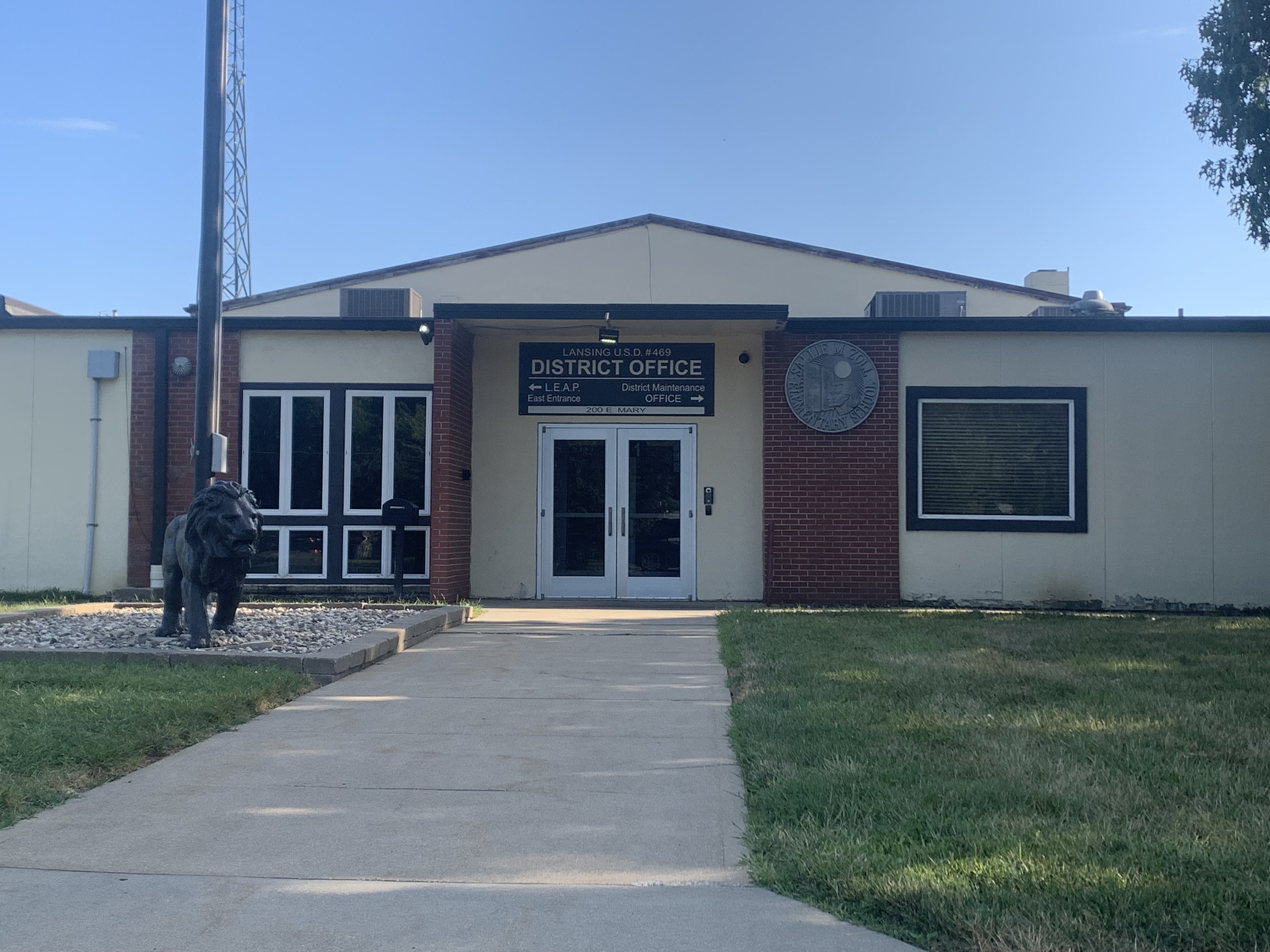
Lansing School District building (2025)

Lansing USD 469 is a public unified school district headquartered in Lansing, Kansas, United States. The district includes the city of Lansing, and a small southern section of the city of Leavenworth.

== Administration ==
USD 469 is currently under the leadership of Superintendent Marty Kobza.

== Board of education ==
The Lansing board of education meets on the second Monday of every month at 6 pm at the District Office. Documents for board meetings can be found at this link on the Thursday prior to the board meeting. https://www.boarddocs.com/ks/usd469/Board.nsf/Public

== Schools ==
The school district operates the following schools:

- Lansing High School (9-12)
- Lansing Middle School (6-8)
- Lansing Intermediate School (4-5)
- Lansing Elementary School (K-3)
- Lansing Early Childhood Center (PreK)

== See also ==
- Kansas State Department of Education
- Kansas State High School Activities Association
- List of high schools in Kansas
- List of unified school districts in Kansas
