= USS Kickapoo =

Two ships of the United States Navy have borne the name USS Kickapoo:

- USS Kickapoo (1864), was a Milwaukee-class monitor commissioned 8 July 1864 and sold at auction 12 September 1874
- USS Kickapoo (AT-29), was renamed Mahopac prior to launch 24 February 1919
