= Jarbalo, Kansas =

Unincorporated community in Kansas, U.S.

Coordinates: 39°12′07″N 95°04′09″W

Jarbalo is an unincorporated community in Leavenworth County, Kansas, United States. It is part of the Kansas City metropolitan area.

== History ==
Jarbalo was located on the Atchison, Topeka and Santa Fe Railway.

A post office was opened in Jarbalo in 1872, and remained in operation until it was discontinued in 1958.
