= Kickapoo High School =

Kickapoo High School may refer to:

- Kickapoo High School (Springfield, Missouri)
- Kickapoo High School (Viola, Wisconsin)
