= Reno, Kansas =

Unincorporated community in Kansas, U.S.

Reno is an unincorporated community in Leavenworth County, Kansas, United States. Reno is located at 39°03′04″N 95°07′12″W. It is part of the Kansas City metropolitan area.

== History ==
A post office was opened in Reno in 1864, and remained in operation until it was discontinued in 1918. The community was named for General Jesse L. Reno.
