= Fall Leaf, Kansas =

Unincorporated community in Kansas, U.S.

Coordinates: 38°58′27″N 95°06′38″W

Fall Leaf is an unincorporated community in Leavenworth County, Kansas, United States. It is part of the Kansas City metropolitan area.

== History ==
A post office called Fall Leaf was established in 1868, and remained in operation until it was discontinued in 1894. The community was named for a Delaware chief.
