= Sherman Township, Leavenworth County, Kansas =

Sherman Township
- Township
- Location in Leavenworth County
- Coordinates: 38°59′17″N 94°57′47″W
- Country: United States
- State: Kansas
- County: Leavenworth

Area
  - Total: 25.64 sq mi (66.40 km^{2})
  - Land: 24.92 sq mi (64.55 km^{2})
  - Water: 0.71 sq mi (1.85 km^{2})
- Elevation: 951 ft (290 m)

Population (2020)
  - Total: 2,792
  - Density: 112.0/sq mi (43.25/km^{2})
- Time zone: Central
- ZIP Codes: 66012, 66018, 66052, 66086

Sherman Township is one of ten townships in Leavenworth County, Kansas, United States. As of the 2020 census, its population was 2,792. Sherman contains two cities, Linwood and De Soto.

== Cities ==
=== Incorporated Cities ===
- Linwood
- De Soto (partly in Johnson County)

=== Unincorporated Cities ===
- Lenape
- Loring

(This list is based on USGS data and may include former settlements.)

== Adjacent Townships ==
- Stranger Township in Leavenworth County (north)
- Delaware Township in Wyandotte County (east)
- Lexington Township in Johnson County (south)
- Eudora Township in Douglas County (southwest)

== Cemeteries ==
The township contains one cemetery:

- Chance Cemetery, Linwood

== Transportation ==
=== Major highways ===
- I-70
- K-32
- CR 2
- CR 26

=== Airports and landing strips ===
- Ingels Aerodrome, De Soto
- Huff Airstrip, Bonner Springs

== Emergency Services ==
- Sherman Township Fire & EMS

== School districts ==
- Basehor-Linwood USD 458
- Tonganoxie USD 464
- Bonner Springs–Edwardsville USD 204
- De Soto USD 232
