= Lansing, Kansas =

- City
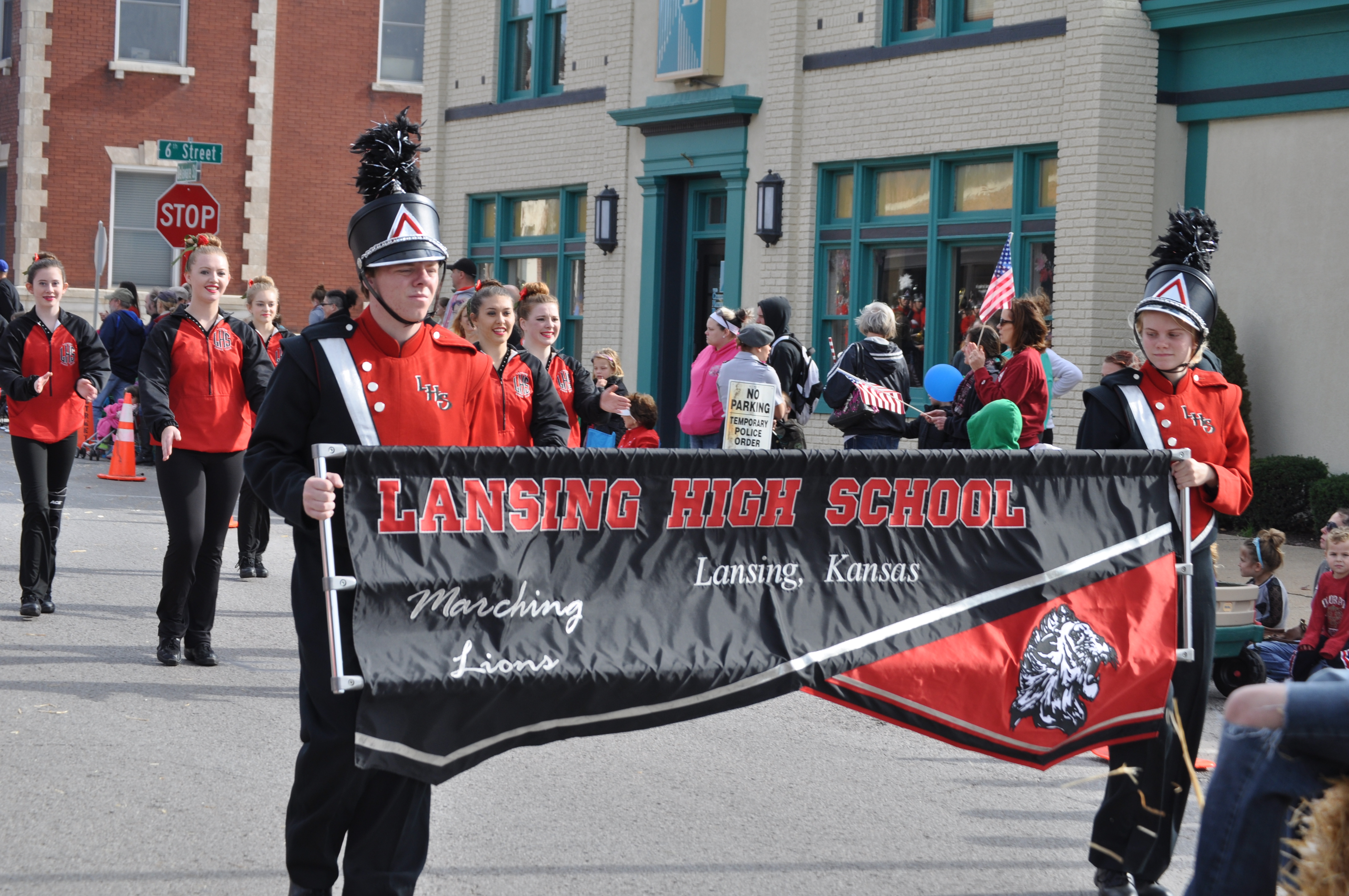
- Lansing High School band marching in the 2015 Veterans Day Parade

- Seal

- Location within Leavenworth County and Kansas

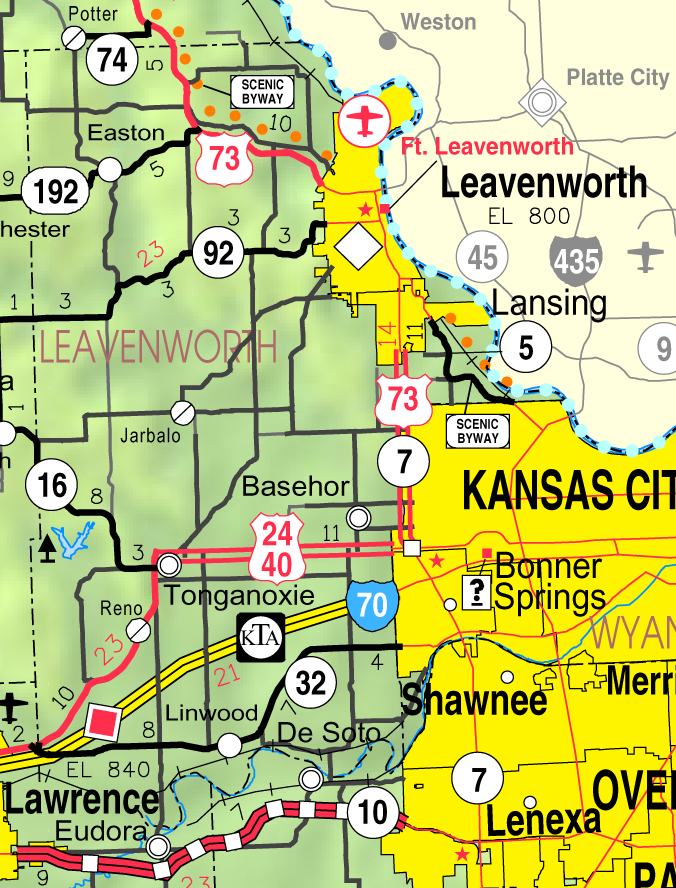
- KDOT map of Leavenworth County (legend)
- Coordinates: 39°14′52″N 94°53′49″W
- Country: United States
- State: Kansas
- County: Leavenworth
- Platted: 1878
- Incorporated: 1959
- Named for: James Lansing

Government
  - Mayor: Tony McNeill
  - City Administrator: Tim Vandall

Area
  - Total: 12.41 sq mi (32.14 km^{2})
  - Land: 12.31 sq mi (31.88 km^{2})
  - Water: 0.10 sq mi (0.27 km^{2}) 0.88%
- Elevation: 860 ft (260 m)

Population (2020)
  - Total: 11,239
  - Density: 913.1/sq mi (352.5/km^{2})
- Time zone: UTC-6 (CST)
  - Summer (DST): UTC-5 (CDT)
- ZIP Code: 66043
- Area code: 913
- GNIS ID: 485607
- Website: lansingks.org

Lansing is a city in Leavenworth County, Kansas, United States. It is situated along the west side of the Missouri River and Kansas-Missouri state border. As of the 2020 census, the population of the city was 11,239. It is the second most populous city of Leavenworth County and is a part of the Kansas City metropolitan area. The Lansing Correctional Facility (formerly the Kansas State Penitentiary), which includes the state's main maximum-security prison, is located in Lansing.

== History ==
Lansing is named for James Lansing, a pioneer settler. Formerly William Lansing Taylor, James changed his name upon his enlistment in 1862 as a hospital steward in the 7th Kansas Cavalry. Following the Civil War, he earned a position at the new state penitentiary in Kansas as a hospital steward. He later resigned and opened a general mercantile store, which held the post office and an apothecary business, in the area called "Town of Progress". "Doc Lansing", as he became known, and his friend John C. Schmidt became co-owners of 90 acres (360,000 m^{2}) of land that was platted into town lots in 1878; they named the area "Town of Lansing". Lansing did not become an incorporated city until 1959.

The Kansas State Penitentiary, later renamed the Lansing Correctional Facility in 1990, was authorized by the Kansas Constitution in 1859; it is the state's largest and oldest facility for detention and rehabilitation of male adult felons. With the opening of the coal mine at the prison the town became an important shipping point for this product.

Lansing was ranked 88 in the top 100 of Money Magazine's 2007 list of best places to live.

== Geography ==
Lansing is situated along the western bank of the Missouri River, which also marks the Kansas-Missouri state border. It is bordered by the city of Leavenworth to the north; Kansas City is less than a half-hour to the southeast. U.S. Route 73 passes through the city.

According to the United States Census Bureau, the city has a total area of 12.50 square miles (32.37 km^{2}), of which 12.39 square miles (32.09 km^{2}) is land and 0.11 square miles (0.28 km^{2}) is water.

=== Climate ===
The climate in this area is characterized by hot, humid summers and generally mild to cool winters. According to the Köppen Climate Classification system, Lansing has a humid subtropical climate, abbreviated "Cfa" on climate maps.

== Demographics ==
Historical population
Census	Pop.	Note	%±
1880	933		—
1890	1,468		57.3%
1960	1,264		—
1970	3,797		200.4%
1980	5,307		39.8%
1990	7,120		34.2%
2000	9,199		29.2%
2010	11,265		22.5%
2020	11,239		−0.2%
2023 (est.)	11,221		−0.2%
U.S. Decennial Census; 2010-2020

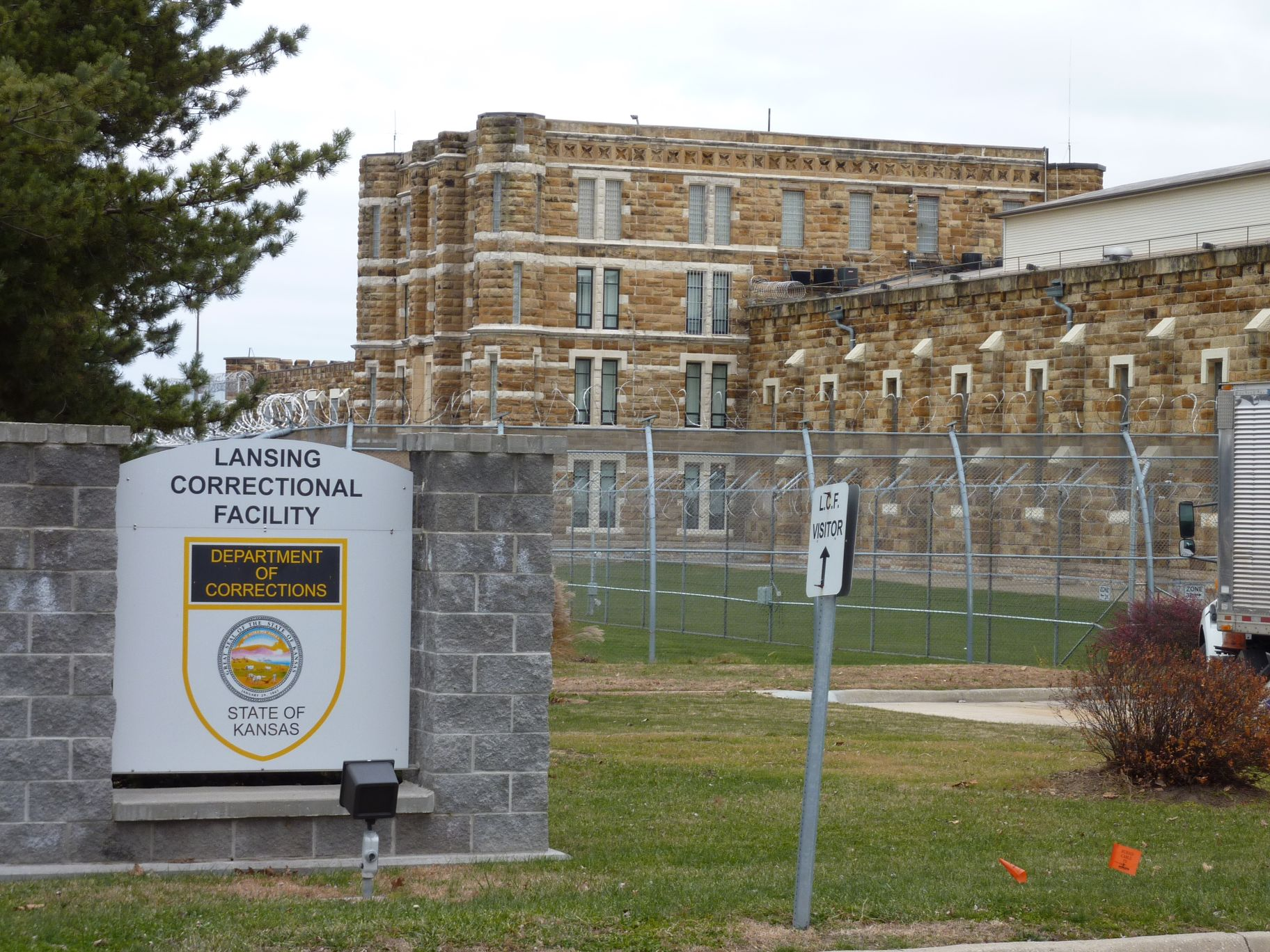
Lansing Correctional Facility is a Kansas State prison in Lansing

=== Racial and ethnic composition ===
Lansing city, Kansas – Racial and ethnic composition Note: the US Census treats Hispanic/Latino as an ethnic category. This table excludes Latinos from the racial categories and assigns them to a separate category. Hispanics/Latinos may be of any race.
Race / Ethnicity (NH = Non-Hispanic)	Pop 2000	Pop 2010	Pop 2020	% 2000	% 2010	% 2020
White alone (NH)	7,238	8,631	8,227	78.68%	76.62%	73.20%
Black or African American alone (NH)	1,131	1,465	1,242	12.29%	13.00%	11.05%
Native American or Alaska Native alone (NH)	100	81	59	1.09%	0.72%	0.52%
Asian alone (NH)	121	223	175	1.32%	1.98%	1.56%
Native Hawaiian or Pacific Islander alone (NH)	13	12	20	0.14%	0.11%	0.18%
Other race alone (NH)	22	12	44	0.24%	0.11%	0.39%
Mixed race or Multiracial (NH)	220	263	666	2.39%	2.33%	5.93%
Hispanic or Latino (any race)	354	578	806	3.85%	5.13%	7.17%
Total	9,199	11,265	11,239	100.00%	100.00%	100.00%

=== 2020 census ===
As of the 2020 census, Lansing had a population of 11,239 in 3,432 households and 2,566 families. The population density was 913.1 per square mile (352.6/km^{2}), and there were 3,612 housing units at an average density of 293.5 per square mile (113.3/km^{2}). Of the housing units, 5.0% were vacant; the homeowner vacancy rate was 1.4% and the rental vacancy rate was 7.5%.

94.7% of residents lived in urban areas, while 5.3% lived in rural areas.

22.2% of the population was under the age of 18, 8.2% from 18 to 24, 28.5% from 25 to 44, 26.7% from 45 to 64, and 14.3% who were 65 years of age or older. The median age was 38.9 years. For every 100 females there were 126.7 males, and for every 100 females age 18 and over there were 133.0 males aged 18 and over.

Of the 3,432 households, 37.3% had children under the age of 18 living in them. Of all households, 58.3% were married-couple households, 13.0% were households with a male householder and no spouse or partner present, and 22.5% were households with a female householder and no spouse or partner present. About 20.9% of all households were made up of individuals and 9.7% had someone living alone who was 65 years of age or older. The average household size was 3.0 and the average family size was 3.3.

Racial composition as of the 2020 census
Race	Number	Percent
White	8,483	75.5%
Black or African American	1,274	11.3%
American Indian and Alaska Native	78	0.7%
Asian	184	1.6%
Native Hawaiian and Other Pacific Islander	22	0.2%
Some other race	205	1.8%
Two or more races	993	8.8%

Non-Hispanic White residents made up 73.2% of the population.

=== 2016–2020 American Community Survey estimates ===
The 2016–2020 5-year American Community Survey estimates show that the median household income was $87,154 (with a margin of error of +/- $10,293) and the median family income was $98,015 (+/- $6,783). Males had a median income of $25,667 (+/- $13,589) versus $31,406 (+/- $11,559) for females. The median income for those above 16 years old was $27,818 (+/- $10,643). The percent of those with a bachelor's degree or higher was estimated to be 30.1% of the population. Approximately, 0.5% of families and 1.1% of the population were below the poverty line, including 0.7% of those under the age of 18 and 4.3% of those ages 65 or over.

=== 2010 census ===
As of the census of 2010, there were 11,265 people, 3,180 households, and 2,496 families living in the city. The population density was 909.2 inhabitants per square mile (351.0/km^{2}). There were 3,371 housing units at an average density of 272.1 per square mile (105.1/km^{2}). The racial makeup of the city was 80.2% White, 13.2% African American, 0.8% Native American, 2.0% Asian, 0.1% Pacific Islander, 0.8% from other races, and 2.8% from two or more races. Hispanic or Latino of any race were 5.1% of the population.

There were 3,180 households, of which 41.9% had children under the age of 18 living with them, 62.4% were married couples living together, 11.8% had a female householder with no husband present, 4.3% had a male householder with no wife present, and 21.5% were non-families. 18.1% of all households were made up of individuals, and 6.7% had someone living alone who was 65 years of age or older. The average household size was 2.79 and the average family size was 3.15.

The median age in the city was 37.6 years. 22.9% of residents were under the age of 18; 8.1% were between the ages of 18 and 24; 31.2% were from 25 to 44; 29.3% were from 45 to 64; and 8.3% were 65 years of age or older. The gender makeup of the city was 59.4% male and 40.6% female.

== Education ==
The community is served by Lansing USD 469 public school district, and operates four schools, with more than 2,000 students.

- Lansing Elementary School, grades K–3
- Lansing Intermediate School, grades 4–5
- Lansing Middle School, grades 6–8
- Lansing High School, grades 9–12

== Notable people ==
- John Bradford, member of Kansas House of Representatives.
- Paul Ranous Greever, United States Representative from Wyoming born in Lansing.

== See also ==
- Lansing Man
