= Kickapoo, Kansas =

Unincorporated community in Kansas, U.S.

Coordinates: 39°23′56″N 94°58′16″W

Voting in Kickapoo, 1857 (illustration by Frank Beard, 1867)

Kickapoo is an unincorporated community in Kickapoo Township, Leavenworth County, Kansas, United States. It is part of the Kansas City metropolitan area.

== History ==
Kickapoo was laid out in 1854. It was named after the Kickapoo people.

Kickapoo was a station on the Missouri Pacific Railroad.

The post office in Kickapoo closed in 1920.
