= Springdale, Kansas =

Unincorporated community in Kansas, U.S.

Coordinates: 39.259°N 95.124°W

Springdale is an unincorporated community in Leavenworth County, Kansas, United States.

== History ==
Springdale was platted in 1860. A post office was established at Springdale in 1860, and remained in operation until it was discontinued in 1907.
