= Leavenworth County, Kansas =

County in Kansas, United States

- County
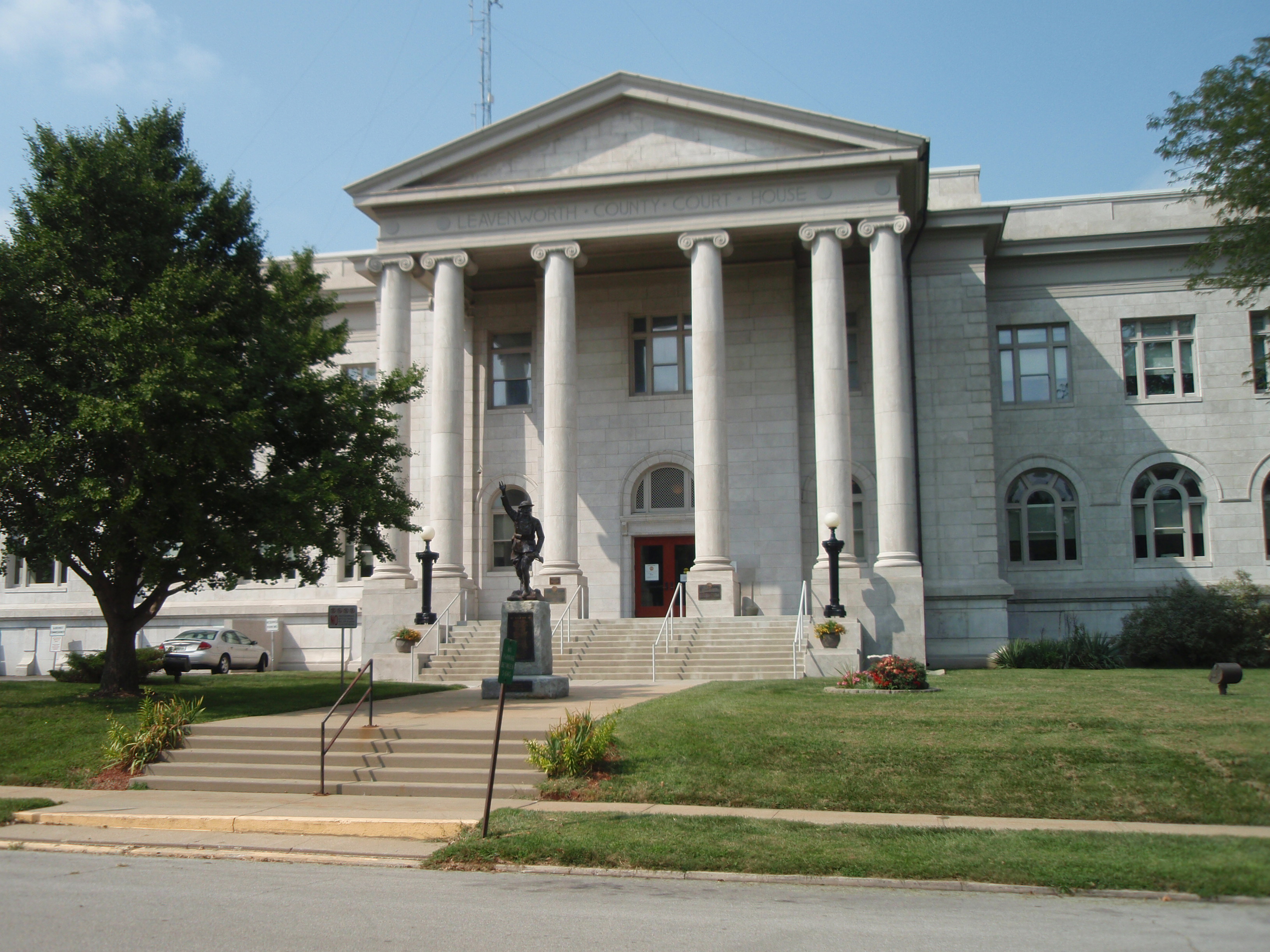
- Leavenworth County Courthouse in Leavenworth

- Location within the U.S. state of Kansas
- Coordinates: 39°16′07″N 95°07′32″W
- Country: United States
- State: Kansas
- Founded: August 25, 1855
- Named for: Henry Leavenworth
- Seat: Leavenworth
- Largest city: Leavenworth

Area
  - Total: 469 sq mi (1,210 km^{2})
  - Land: 463 sq mi (1,200 km^{2})
  - Water: 6.1 sq mi (16 km^{2}) 1.3%

Population (2020)
  - Total: 81,881
  - Estimate (2025): 84,590 ▲
  - Density: 176.8/sq mi (68.3/km^{2})
- Time zone: UTC−6 (Central)
  - Summer (DST): UTC−5 (CDT)
- Congressional district: 2nd
- Website: leavenworthcounty.gov

Leavenworth County is a county located in the U.S. state of Kansas and is part of the Kansas City metropolitan area. Its county seat and most populous city is Leavenworth. As of the 2020 census, the county population was 81,881. The county was named after Henry Leavenworth, a general in the Indian Wars who established Fort Leavenworth.

== History ==
=== Early history ===
For many millennia, the Great Plains of North America was inhabited by nomadic Native Americans. From the 16th century to 18th century, the Kingdom of France claimed ownership of large parts of North America. In 1762, after the French and Indian War, France secretly ceded New France to Spain, per the Treaty of Fontainebleau.

=== 19th century ===
In 1802, Spain returned most of the land to France, but keeping title to about 7,500 square miles. In 1803, most of the land for modern day Kansas was acquired by the United States from France as part of the 828,000 square mile Louisiana Purchase for 2.83 cents per acre.

In 1854, the Kansas Territory was organized, then in 1861 Kansas became the 34th U.S. state. In 1855, Leavenworth County was established, and is among the first 33 counties, which were formed by the first territorial government. It was named, as was its county seat, after Henry Leavenworth, an officer in the War of 1812.

Leavenworth County had the first Kansas State University extension agent in the State.

== Geography ==
According to the United States Census Bureau, the county has a total area of 469 square miles (1,210 km^{2}), of which 463 square miles (1,200 km^{2}) is land and 6.1 square miles (16 km^{2}) (1.3%) is water. It is the fifth-smallest county in Kansas by total area.

This county's watershed connects with both the Kansas River basin on the south via Stranger Creek and has a Missouri River port city to the east.

=== Adjacent counties ===
- Platte County, Missouri (north)
- Wyandotte County (east)
- Johnson County (southeast)
- Douglas County (southwest)
- Jefferson County (west)
- Atchison County (northwest)

== Demographics ==
Historical population
| Census | Pop. | Note | %± |
|---|---|---|---|
| 1860 | 12,606 | | — |
| 1870 | 32,444 | | 157.4% |
| 1880 | 32,355 | | −0.3% |
| 1890 | 38,485 | | 18.9% |
| 1900 | 40,940 | | 6.4% |
| 1910 | 41,207 | | 0.7% |
| 1920 | 38,402 | | −6.8% |
| 1930 | 42,673 | | 11.1% |
| 1940 | 41,112 | | −3.7% |
| 1950 | 42,361 | | 3.0% |
| 1960 | 48,524 | | 14.5% |
| 1970 | 53,340 | | 9.9% |
| 1980 | 54,809 | | 2.8% |
| 1990 | 64,371 | | 17.4% |
| 2000 | 68,691 | | 6.7% |
| 2010 | 76,227 | | 11.0% |
| 2020 | 81,881 | | 7.4% |
| 2025 (est.) | 84,590 | ▲ | 3.3% |
U.S. Decennial Census; 1790-1960 1900-1990; 1990-2000 2010-2020

The county is a part of the Kansas City Metropolitan Area.

=== 2020 census ===
Leavenworth County, Kansas – Racial and ethnic composition Note: the US Census treats Hispanic/Latino as an ethnic category. This table excludes Latinos from the racial categories and assigns them to a separate category. Hispanics/Latinos may be of any race.
| Race / Ethnicity (NH = Non-Hispanic) | Pop 1980 | Pop 1990 | Pop 2000 | Pop 2010 | Pop 2020 | % 1980 | % 1990 | % 2000 | % 2010 | % 2020 |
|---|---|---|---|---|---|---|---|---|---|---|
| White alone (NH) | 47,047 | 53,928 | 56,355 | 61,226 | 62,503 | 85.84% | 83.78% | 82.04% | 80.32% | 76.33% |
| Black or African American alone (NH) | 5,426 | 6,894 | 7,018 | 7,007 | 6,656 | 9.90% | 10.71% | 10.22% | 9.19% | 8.13% |
| Native American or Alaska Native alone (NH) | 275 | 388 | 461 | 526 | 589 | 0.50% | 0.60% | 0.67% | 0.69% | 0.72% |
| Asian alone (NH) | 507 | 907 | 723 | 950 | 1,060 | 0.93% | 1.41% | 1.05% | 1.25% | 1.29% |
| Native Hawaiian or Pacific Islander alone (NH) | x | x | 88 | 97 | 138 | x | x | 0.13% | 0.13% | 0.17% |
| Other race alone (NH) | 240 | 62 | 132 | 72 | 253 | 0.44% | 0.10% | 0.19% | 0.09% | 0.31% |
| Mixed race or Multiracial (NH) | x | x | 1,294 | 2,041 | 5,080 | x | x | 1.88% | 2.68% | 6.20% |
| Hispanic or Latino (any race) | 1,314 | 2,192 | 2,620 | 4,308 | 5,602 | 2.40% | 3.41% | 3.81% | 5.65% | 6.84% |
| Total | 54,809 | 64,371 | 68,691 | 76,227 | 81,881 | 100.00% | 100.00% | 100.00% | 100.00% | 100.00% |

=== 2020 census ===
As of the 2020 census, the county had a population of 81,881. The median age was 38.5 years, with 24.1% of residents under the age of 18 and 15.3% aged 65 or older.

For every 100 females there were 111.0 males, and for every 100 females age 18 and over there were 112.0 males age 18 and over. 66.8% of residents lived in urban areas, while 33.2% lived in rural areas.

The racial makeup of the county was 78.9% White, 8.4% Black or African American, 0.9% American Indian and Alaska Native, 1.3% Asian, 0.2% Native Hawaiian and Pacific Islander, 1.6% from some other race, and 8.7% from two or more races. Hispanic or Latino residents of any race comprised 6.8% of the population.

There were 28,916 households in the county, of which 34.1% had children under the age of 18 living with them and 21.8% had a female householder with no spouse or partner present. About 24.2% of all households were made up of individuals and 10.1% had someone living alone who was 65 years of age or older.

There were 31,219 housing units, of which 7.4% were vacant. Among occupied housing units, 66.9% were owner-occupied and 33.1% were renter-occupied. The homeowner vacancy rate was 1.3% and the rental vacancy rate was 10.0%.

=== 2000 census ===
As of the census of 2000, there were 68,691 people, 23,071 households, and 17,210 families residing in the county. The population density was 148 people per square mile (57 people/km^{2}). There were 24,401 housing units at an average density of 53 per square mile (20/km^{2}). The racial makeup of the county was 84.2% White, 10.4% Black or African American, 0.7% Native American, 1.1% Asian, 0.1% Pacific Islander, 1.2% from other races, and 2.2% from two or more races. Hispanic or Latino of any race were 3.8% of the population.

There were 23,071 households, out of which 38.9% had children under the age of 18 living with them, 61.4% were married couples living together, 9.5% had a female householder with no husband present, and 25.4% were non-families. 21.7% of all households were made up of individuals, and 8.1% had someone living alone who was 65 years of age or older. The average household size was 2.69 and the average family size was 3.15.

In the county, the population was spread out, with 26.7% under the age of 18, 8.2% from 18 to 24, 33.0% from 25 to 44, 22.2% from 45 to 64, and 9.8% who were 65 years of age or older. The median age was 36 years. For every 100 females there were 113.50 males. For every 100 females age 18 and over, there were 116.90 males.

The median income for a household in the county was $48,114, and the median income for a family was $55,805. Males had a median income of $40,047 versus $26,029 for females. The per capita income for the county was $20,292. About 4.8% of families and 6.7% of the population were below the poverty line, including 8.8% of those under age 18 and 7.5% of those age 65 or over.

== Government ==
=== Presidential elections ===
Presidential election results

United States presidential election results for Leavenworth County, Kansas
| Year | Republican | | Democratic | | Third party(ies) | |
| Year | No. | % | No. | % | No. | % |
|---|---|---|---|---|---|---|
| 1888 | 3,272 | 45.48% | 3,516 | 48.87% | 406 | 5.64% |
| 1892 | 3,471 | 46.96% | 0 | 0.00% | 3,921 | 53.04% |
| 1896 | 4,004 | 45.83% | 4,665 | 53.39% | 68 | 0.78% |
| 1900 | 4,162 | 49.84% | 4,109 | 49.20% | 80 | 0.96% |
| 1904 | 5,771 | 64.15% | 2,775 | 30.85% | 450 | 5.00% |
| 1908 | 4,846 | 53.87% | 3,818 | 42.44% | 332 | 3.69% |
| 1912 | 2,562 | 33.05% | 3,099 | 39.97% | 2,092 | 26.98% |
| 1916 | 5,536 | 45.46% | 6,002 | 49.29% | 640 | 5.26% |
| 1920 | 6,846 | 65.05% | 3,409 | 32.39% | 269 | 2.56% |
| 1924 | 9,429 | 68.05% | 2,982 | 21.52% | 1,445 | 10.43% |
| 1928 | 8,472 | 56.27% | 6,539 | 43.43% | 45 | 0.30% |
| 1932 | 6,484 | 40.24% | 9,507 | 59.00% | 123 | 0.76% |
| 1936 | 8,532 | 51.39% | 7,996 | 48.17% | 73 | 0.44% |
| 1940 | 8,503 | 58.25% | 6,053 | 41.46% | 42 | 0.29% |
| 1944 | 7,282 | 58.55% | 5,097 | 40.98% | 59 | 0.47% |
| 1948 | 6,474 | 48.61% | 6,740 | 50.61% | 103 | 0.77% |
| 1952 | 9,046 | 61.19% | 5,698 | 38.54% | 39 | 0.26% |
| 1956 | 8,826 | 61.55% | 5,480 | 38.22% | 33 | 0.23% |
| 1960 | 7,870 | 53.06% | 6,926 | 46.70% | 36 | 0.24% |
| 1964 | 5,544 | 42.36% | 7,479 | 57.14% | 66 | 0.50% |
| 1968 | 7,081 | 48.35% | 5,546 | 37.87% | 2,018 | 13.78% |
| 1972 | 10,762 | 67.70% | 4,727 | 29.74% | 408 | 2.57% |
| 1976 | 8,407 | 50.11% | 8,022 | 47.81% | 349 | 2.08% |
| 1980 | 9,157 | 54.98% | 6,354 | 38.15% | 1,145 | 6.87% |
| 1984 | 11,194 | 62.29% | 6,604 | 36.75% | 172 | 0.96% |
| 1988 | 9,913 | 52.53% | 8,797 | 46.62% | 160 | 0.85% |
| 1992 | 7,738 | 33.39% | 8,077 | 34.86% | 7,357 | 31.75% |
| 1996 | 10,778 | 47.90% | 9,098 | 40.44% | 2,624 | 11.66% |
| 2000 | 12,583 | 54.07% | 9,733 | 41.82% | 955 | 4.10% |
| 2004 | 15,949 | 58.35% | 11,039 | 40.39% | 343 | 1.25% |
| 2008 | 16,791 | 54.89% | 13,255 | 43.33% | 545 | 1.78% |
| 2012 | 17,059 | 58.65% | 11,357 | 39.05% | 669 | 2.30% |
| 2016 | 17,638 | 58.21% | 10,209 | 33.69% | 2,454 | 8.10% |
| 2020 | 21,610 | 59.22% | 13,886 | 38.05% | 994 | 2.72% |
| 2024 | 22,055 | 60.35% | 13,732 | 37.57% | 760 | 2.08% |

=== Laws ===
Leavenworth County was a prohibition, or "dry", county until the Kansas Constitution was amended in 1986 and voters approved the sale of alcoholic liquor by the individual drink with a 30 percent food sales requirement.

The county voted "No" on the 2022 Kansas abortion referendum, an anti-abortion ballot measure, by 59% to 41% despite backing Donald Trump with 59% of the vote to Joe Biden's 38% in the 2020 presidential election.

== Education ==
=== Colleges and universities ===
- United States Army Command and General Staff College
- University of Saint Mary
- Leavenworth Normal School (closed)

=== Unified school districts ===
School districts include:

- Basehor-Linwood USD 458
- Bonner Springs USD 204
- Easton USD 449
- Fort Leavenworth USD 207
- Jefferson County North USD 339
- Kansas City USD
- Lansing USD 469
- Lawrence USD 497
- Leavenworth USD 453
- McLouth USD 342
- Tonganoxie USD 464

== Communities ==
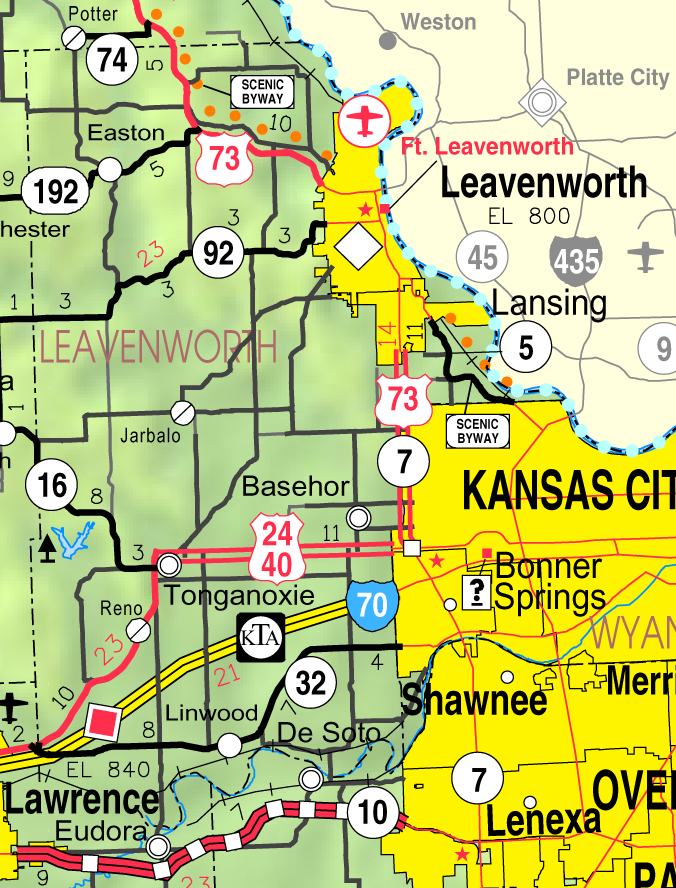
2005 map of Leavenworth County (map legend)

List of townships / incorporated cities / unincorporated communities / extinct former communities within Leavenworth County.

=== Cities ===
‡ means a community has portions in an adjacent county.

- Basehor
- Bonner Springs‡
- De Soto‡
- Easton
- Lansing
- Leavenworth (county seat)
- Linwood
- Tonganoxie

=== Unincorporated communities ===
- Fairmount
- Fall Leaf
- Fort Leavenworth
- Hoge
- Jarbalo
- Kickapoo
- Lenape
- Lowemont
- Millwood
- Reno
- Springdale
- Wadsworth

=== Ghost town ===
- Delaware City

=== Townships ===
Leavenworth County is divided into ten townships. The cities of Lansing and Leavenworth are considered governmentally independent and are excluded from the census figures for the townships. In the following table, the population center is the largest city (or cities) included in that township's population total, if it is of a significant size.

| Township | FIPS | Population center | Population | Population density /km^{2} (/sq mi) | Land area km^{2} (sq mi) | Water area km^{2} (sq mi) | Water % | Geographic coordinates |
|---|---|---|---|---|---|---|---|---|
| Alexandria | 01100 | | 859 | 7 (18) | 123 (48) | 1 (0) | 0.62% | 39°16′8″N 95°7′33″W |
| Delaware | 17450 | | 1,361 | 22 (57) | 62 (24) | 3 (1) | 4.19% | 39°14′50″N 94°52′40″W |
| Easton | 19625 | | 1,245 | 11 (30) | 109 (42) | 0 (0) | 0.11% | 39°21′57″N 95°7′27″W |
| Fairmount | 22325 | Basehor | 6,266 | 61 (159) | 102 (39) | 0 (0) | 0.39% | 39°8′4″N 94°56′26″W |
| High Prairie | 32125 | | 1,768 | 14 (37) | 124 (48) | 0 (0) | 0.27% | 39°15′30″N 95°0′34″W |
| Kickapoo | 36700 | | 1,760 | 15 (40) | 114 (44) | 3 (1) | 2.39% | 39°20′45″N 94°59′29″W |
| Reno | 58950 | | 1,143 | 10 (27) | 111 (43) | 2 (1) | 1.56% | 39°1′8″N 95°8′8″W |
| Sherman | 65000 | | 2,367 | 22 (57) | 108 (42) | 3 (1) | 2.44% | 39°0′59″N 95°0′27″W |
| Stranger | 68500 | | 2,451 | 19 (50) | 127 (49) | 0 (0) | 0.17% | 39°8′16″N 95°2′2″W |
| Tonganoxie | 70825 | Tonganoxie (part) | 4,852 | 35 (91) | 137 (53) | 1 (0) | 0.66% | 39°7′0″N 95°6′35″W |
Sources: "Census 2000 U.S. Gazetteer Files". U.S. Census Bureau, Geography Division. Archived from the original on August 2, 2002.

== Notable people ==
- Sean Malto, professional skateboarder
- Wayne Simien, professional basketball player

== See also ==
- National Register of Historic Places listings in Leavenworth County, Kansas
- Lenape and Christian Munsee
- Ernest Fox Nichols - Educator and MIT physicist
- Fort Leavenworth (Frontier Army Museum)
- Freedom's Frontier, NE Kansas National Heritage Area
- Kansas Sampler, shares insights on community character

Community information for Kansas

- Kansas locations by per capita income
- List of counties in Kansas
- List of townships in Kansas
- List of cities in Kansas
- List of unincorporated communities in Kansas
- List of ghost towns in Kansas
