= Easton, Kansas =

- City
- Location within Leavenworth County and Kansas

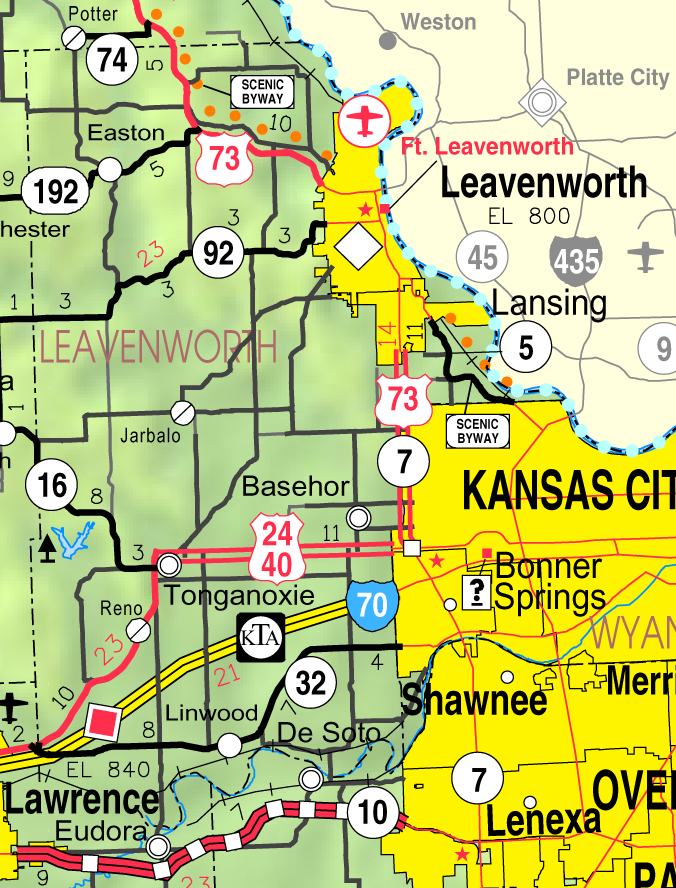
- KDOT map of Leavenworth County (legend)
- Coordinates: 39°20′40″N 95°6′59″W
- Country: United States
- State: Kansas
- County: Leavenworth
- Founded: 1850s
- Platted: 1854
- Incorporated: 1903
- Named for: Easton, Pennsylvania

Area
  - Total: 0.16 sq mi (0.41 km^{2})
  - Land: 0.16 sq mi (0.41 km^{2})
  - Water: 0 sq mi (0.00 km^{2})
- Elevation: 906 ft (276 m)

Population (2020)
  - Total: 213
  - Density: 1,300/sq mi (520/km^{2})
- Time zone: UTC-6 (CST)
  - Summer (DST): UTC-5 (CDT)
- ZIP Code: 66020
- Area code: 913
- GNIS ID: 2394611
- Website: eastonkansas.com

Easton is a city in Leavenworth County, Kansas, United States, and part of the Kansas City metropolitan area. As of the 2020 census, the population of the city was 213.

== History ==
Easton was originally known as Eastin, and under the latter name was laid out in 1854 by General Eastin J. Trader . Later, at the insistence of Governor Andrew Horatio Reeder, the name was changed to Easton for Reeder's birthplace of Easton, Pennsylvania.

The first post office in Easton was established in December 1855.

== Geography ==
According to the United States Census Bureau, the city has a total area of 0.14 square miles (0.36 km^{2}), all land.

=== Climate ===
The climate in this area is characterized by hot, humid summers and generally mild to cool winters. According to the Köppen Climate Classification system, Easton has a humid subtropical climate, abbreviated "Cfa" on climate maps.

== Demographics ==
Historical population
Census	Pop.	Note	%±
1910	310		—
1920	228		−26.5%
1930	277		21.5%
1940	255		−7.9%
1950	255		0.0%
1960	320		25.5%
1970	435		35.9%
1980	460		5.7%
1990	405		−12.0%
2000	362		−10.6%
2010	253		−30.1%
2020	213		−15.8%
U.S. Decennial Census

=== Racial and ethnic composition ===
Easton city, Kansas – Racial and ethnic composition Note: the US Census treats Hispanic/Latino as an ethnic category. This table excludes Latinos from the racial categories and assigns them to a separate category. Hispanics/Latinos may be of any race.
Race / Ethnicity (NH = Non-Hispanic)	Pop 2000	Pop 2010	Pop 2020	% 2000	% 2010	% 2020
White alone (NH)	340	247	182	93.92%	97.63%	85.45%
Black or African American alone (NH)	4	1	2	1.10%	0.40%	0.94%
Native American or Alaska Native alone (NH)	3	0	2	0.83%	0.00%	0.94%
Asian alone (NH)	1	0	0	0.28%	0.00%	0.00%
Native Hawaiian or Pacific Islander alone (NH)	0	0	0	0.00%	0.00%	0.00%
Other race alone (NH)	0	0	2	0.00%	0.00%	0.94%
Mixed race or Multiracial (NH)	7	2	13	1.93%	0.79%	6.10%
Hispanic or Latino (any race)	7	3	12	1.93%	1.19%	5.63%
Total	362	253	213	100.00%	100.00%	100.00%

=== 2020 census ===
The 2020 United States census counted 213 people, 75 households, and 53 families in Easton. The population density was 1,267.9 per square mile (489.5/km^{2}). There were 91 housing units at an average density of 541.7 per square mile (209.1/km^{2}). The racial makeup was 89.2% (190) white or European American (85.45% non-Hispanic white), 0.94% (2) black or African-American, 1.41% (3) Native American or Alaska Native, 0.0% (0) Asian, 0.0% (0) Pacific Islander or Native Hawaiian, 1.41% (3) from other races, and 7.04% (15) from two or more races. Hispanic or Latino of any race was 5.63% (12) of the population.

Of the 75 households, 34.7% had children under the age of 18; 34.7% were married couples living together; 21.3% had a female householder with no spouse or partner present. 24.0% of households consisted of individuals and 12.0% had someone living alone who was 65 years of age or older. The average household size was 2.6 and the average family size was 3.8. The percent of those with a bachelor's degree or higher was estimated to be 6.1% of the population.

16.9% of the population was under the age of 18, 7.0% from 18 to 24, 18.8% from 25 to 44, 24.9% from 45 to 64, and 32.4% who were 65 years of age or older. The median age was 49.8 years. For every 100 females, there were 108.8 males. For every 100 females ages 18 and older, there were 113.3 males.

The 2016–2020 5-year American Community Survey estimates show that the median household income was $43,750 (with a margin of error of +/- $6,634) and the median family income was $51,250 (+/- $24,780). Males had a median income of $36,250 (+/- $21,507). The median income for those above 16 years old was $28,125 (+/- $8,517). Approximately, 2.3% of families and 6.5% of the population were below the poverty line, including 0.0% of those under the age of 18 and 17.6% of those ages 65 or over.

=== 2010 census ===
As of the census of 2010, there were 253 people, 81 households, and 55 families residing in the city. The population density was 1,807.1 inhabitants per square mile (697.7/km^{2}). There were 100 housing units at an average density of 714.3 per square mile (275.8/km^{2}). The racial makeup of the city was 98.8% White, 0.4% African American, and 0.8% from two or more races. Hispanic or Latino of any race were 1.2% of the population.

There were 81 households, of which 32.1% had children under the age of 18 living with them, 51.9% were married couples living together, 12.3% had a female householder with no husband present, 3.7% had a male householder with no wife present, and 32.1% were non-families. Of all households 25.9% were made up of individuals, and 11.1% had someone living alone who was 65 years of age or older. The average household size was 2.57 and the average family size was 3.09.

The median age in the city was 41.9 years. Of residents 20.6% were under the age of 18; 9% were between the ages of 18 and 24; 25.3% were from 25 to 44; 17.4% were from 45 to 64; and 27.7% were 65 years of age or older. The gender makeup of the city was 46.6% male and 53.4% female.

=== 2000 census ===
As of the census of 2000, there were 362 people, 117 households, and 87 families residing in the city. The population density was 2,523.5 inhabitants per square mile (974.3/km^{2}). There were 138 housing units at an average density of 962.0 per square mile (371.4/km^{2}). The racial makeup of the city was 94% White, 1% African American, 1% Native American, <1% Asian, 1% from other races, and 2% from two or more races. Hispanic or Latino of any race were 2% of the population.

There were 117 households, out of which 44% had children under the age of 18 living with them, 55% were married couples living together, 12% had a female householder with no husband present, and 25% were non-families. Of all households 22% were made up of individuals, and 6% had someone living alone who was 65 years of age or older. The average household size was 2.7 and the average family size was 3.2.

In the city, the population was spread out, with 32% under the age of 18, 9% from 18 to 24, 25% from 25 to 44, 13% from 45 to 64, and 22% who were 65 years of age or older. The median age was 32 years. For every 100 females, there were 97.8 males. For every 100 females age 18 and over, there were 90.8 males.

The median income for a household in the city was $26,818, and the median income for a family was $29,000. Males had a median income of $26,625 versus $19,375 for females. The per capita income for the city was $12,751. About 22% of families and 18% of the population were below the poverty line, including 24% of those under age 18 and 5% of those age 65 or over.

== Education ==
The community is served by Easton USD 449 public school district. Pleasant Ridge High School is the district high school. The Pleasant Ridge High School mascot is Rams.

Easton High School was closed due to school unification. The Easton High School mascot was Easton Dragons.
