= Walnut Township, Atchison County, Kansas =

Walnut Township
- Township
- Location in Atchison County
- Coordinates: 39°27′58″N 095°05′01″W
- Country: United States
- State: Kansas
- County: Atchison

Area
  - Total: 37.2 sq mi (96.4 km^{2})
  - Land: 36.3 sq mi (93.9 km^{2})
  - Water: 0.97 sq mi (2.5 km^{2}) 2.58%
- Elevation: 1,024 ft (312 m)

Population (2010)
  - Total: 441
  - Density: 12/sq mi (4.7/km^{2})
- GNIS feature ID: 0473513

Walnut Township is a township in Atchison County, Kansas, United States. As of the 2010 census, its population was 441.

== Geography ==
Walnut Township covers an area of 37.2 square miles (96.4 km^{2}) and contains no incorporated settlements. According to the USGS, it contains three cemeteries: Mount Gillian, Sapp and Sumner.

The streams of Little Walnut Creek, Owl Creek and Walnut Creek run through this township.
