= Tonganoxie, Kansas =

- City
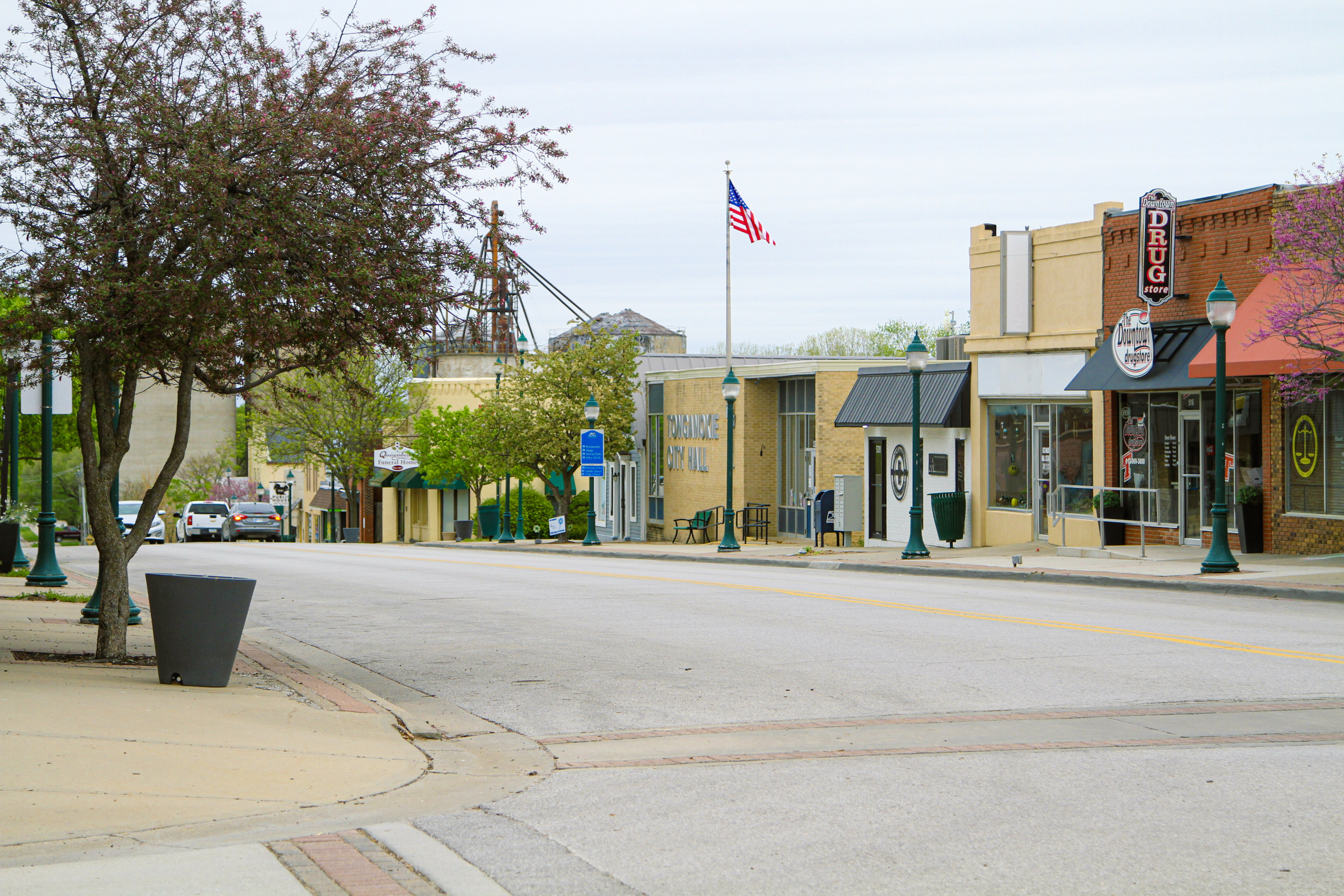
- Downtown of Tonganoxie (2025)

- Location within Leavenworth County and Kansas

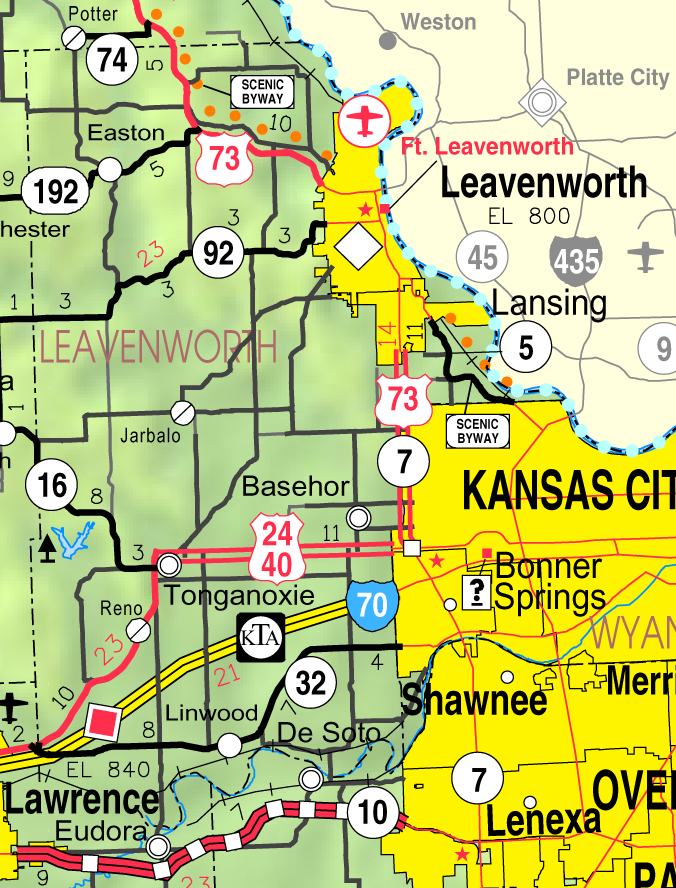
- KDOT map of Leavenworth County (legend)
- Coordinates: 39°06′32″N 95°04′51″W
- Country: United States
- State: Kansas
- County: Leavenworth
- Platted: 1866
- Incorporated: 1871

Government
  - Type: Council–manager
  - Mayor: David Frese
  - City Manager: George Brajkovic

Area
  - Total: 4.09 sq mi (10.60 km^{2})
  - Land: 4.05 sq mi (10.50 km^{2})
  - Water: 0.039 sq mi (0.10 km^{2})
- Elevation: 850 ft (260 m)

Population (2020)
  - Total: 5,573
  - Density: 1,375/sq mi (530.8/km^{2})
- Time zone: UTC-6 (CST)
  - Summer (DST): UTC-5 (CDT)
- ZIP Code: 66086
- Area code: 913
- GNIS ID: 2397035
- Website: tonganoxie.org

Tonganoxie (pronounced /tɒŋɡəˈnɒksi/ tong-gə-NOCK-see) is a city in Leavenworth County, Kansas, United States and is part of the Kansas City metropolitan area. As of the 2020 census, the population of the city was 5,573.

== History ==
Tonganoxie was platted in 1866. It was named for tànkinakwsi, a Native American Chief from the Delaware Tribe whose name means "looking small" or "shorty" in the Delaware language. Tonganoxie was incorporated as a city in 1871.

== Geography ==
According to the United States Census Bureau, the city has a total area of 3.67 square miles (9.51 km^{2}), of which 3.66 square miles (9.48 km^{2}) is land and 0.01 square miles (0.03 km^{2}) is water.

=== Climate ===
The climate in this area is characterized by hot, humid summers and generally cold winters. According to the Köppen Climate Classification system, Tonganoxie has a humid subtropical climate, abbreviated "Cfa" on climate maps.

== Demographics ==
Historical population
| Census | Pop. | Note | %± |
|---|---|---|---|
| 1880 | 426 | | — |
| 1890 | 673 | | 58.0% |
| 1900 | 848 | | 26.0% |
| 1910 | 1,018 | | 20.0% |
| 1920 | 971 | | −4.6% |
| 1930 | 1,109 | | 14.2% |
| 1940 | 1,114 | | 0.5% |
| 1950 | 1,140 | | 2.3% |
| 1960 | 1,354 | | 18.8% |
| 1970 | 1,717 | | 26.8% |
| 1980 | 1,864 | | 8.6% |
| 1990 | 2,347 | | 25.9% |
| 2000 | 2,728 | | 16.2% |
| 2010 | 4,996 | | 83.1% |
| 2020 | 5,573 | | 11.5% |
| 2023 (est.) | 6,102 | | 9.5% |
U.S. Decennial Census; 2010-2020

Tonganoxie city, Kansas – Racial and ethnic composition Note: the US Census treats Hispanic/Latino as an ethnic category. This table excludes Latinos from the racial categories and assigns them to a separate category. Hispanics/Latinos may be of any race.
| Race / Ethnicity (NH = Non-Hispanic) | Pop 2000 | Pop 2010 | Pop 2020 | % 2000 | % 2010 | % 2020 |
|---|---|---|---|---|---|---|
| White alone (NH) | 2,556 | 4,628 | 4,756 | 93.70% | 92.63% | 85.34% |
| Black or African American alone (NH) | 32 | 50 | 79 | 1.17% | 1.00% | 1.42% |
| Native American or Alaska Native alone (NH) | 23 | 31 | 38 | 0.84% | 0.62% | 0.68% |
| Asian alone (NH) | 10 | 15 | 35 | 0.37% | 0.30% | 0.63% |
| Native Hawaiian or Pacific Islander alone (NH) | 7 | 4 | 1 | 0.26% | 0.08% | 0.02% |
| Other race alone (NH) | 3 | 1 | 9 | 0.11% | 0.02% | 0.16% |
| Mixed race or Multiracial (NH) | 35 | 76 | 338 | 1.28% | 1.52% | 6.06% |
| Hispanic or Latino (any race) | 62 | 191 | 317 | 2.27% | 3.82% | 5.69% |
| Total | 2,728 | 4,996 | 5,573 | 100.00% | 100.00% | 100.00% |

=== 2020 census ===
As of the 2020 census, Tonganoxie had a population of 5,573. The median age was 36.0 years. 27.6% of residents were under the age of 18 and 14.9% of residents were 65 years of age or older. For every 100 females there were 98.2 males, and for every 100 females age 18 and over there were 93.0 males age 18 and over.

98.4% of residents lived in urban areas, while 1.6% lived in rural areas.

There were 2,087 households in Tonganoxie, of which 37.9% had children under the age of 18 living in them. Of all households, 53.7% were married-couple households, 15.7% were households with a male householder and no spouse or partner present, and 23.8% were households with a female householder and no spouse or partner present. About 23.0% of all households were made up of individuals and 11.9% had someone living alone who was 65 years of age or older.

There were 2,172 housing units, of which 3.9% were vacant. The homeowner vacancy rate was 1.8% and the rental vacancy rate was 2.9%.

Racial composition as of the 2020 census
| Race | Number | Percent |
|---|---|---|
| White | 4,868 | 87.3% |
| Black or African American | 84 | 1.5% |
| American Indian and Alaska Native | 43 | 0.8% |
| Asian | 36 | 0.6% |
| Native Hawaiian and Other Pacific Islander | 1 | 0.0% |
| Some other race | 84 | 1.5% |
| Two or more races | 457 | 8.2% |

Income and poverty

The 2016–2020 5-year American Community Survey estimates show that the median household income was $75,417 (with a margin of error of +/- $11,132) and the median family income $76,358 (+/- $9,017). Males had a median income of $44,202 (+/- $10,526) versus $36,741 (+/- $13,755) for females. The median income for those above 16 years old was $43,223 (+/- $4,323). Approximately, 7.1% of families and 5.6% of the population were below the poverty line, including 7.5% of those under the age of 18 and 2.0% of those ages 65 or over.

=== 2010 census ===
As of the census of 2010, there were 4,996 people, 1,884 households, and 1,338 families living in the city. The population density was 1,365.0 inhabitants per square mile (527.0/km^{2}). There were 1,973 housing units at an average density of 539.1 per square mile (208.1/km^{2}). The racial makeup of the city was 95.2% White, 1.0% African American, 0.7% Native American, 0.4% Asian, 0.1% Pacific Islander, 0.6% from other races, and 2.0% from two or more races. Hispanic or Latino of any race were 3.8% of the population.

There were 1,884 households, of which 41.1% had children under the age of 18 living with them, 52.8% were married couples living together, 12.8% had a female householder with no husband present, 5.5% had a male householder with no wife present, and 29.0% were non-families. 23.8% of all households were made up of individuals, and 9.9% had someone living alone who was 65 years of age or older. The average household size was 2.61 and the average family size was 3.08.

The median age in the city was 32.5 years. 29.3% of residents were under the age of 18; 7.7% were between the ages of 18 and 24; 29.9% were from 25 to 44; 21.2% were from 45 to 64; and 11.8% were 65 years of age or older. The gender makeup of the city was 47.9% male and 52.1% female.

== Education ==
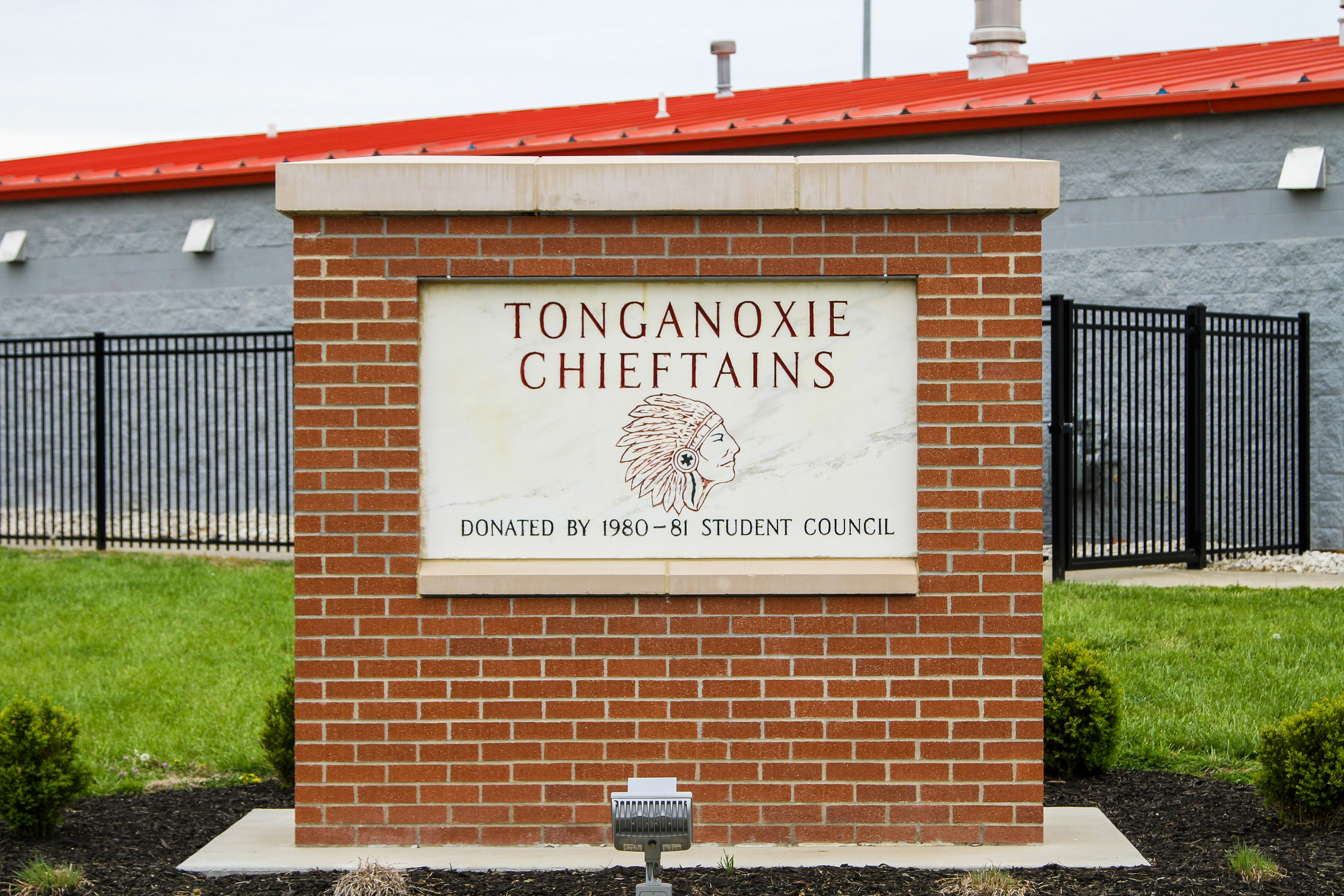
Sign at Tonganoxie High School (2025)

The community is served by Tonganoxie USD 464 public school district. It has a high school, a middle school, and an elementary school. The high school teams are named the Chieftains, while middle school teams are known as the Warriors and the elementary school's mascot is the Braves.

== Economy ==
Peruvian Connection is based in Tonganoxie.

In September 2017, Tyson Foods cancelled plans to build a $320,000,000 chicken processing plant in Tonganoxie after objections from local residents.

== Government ==
Tonganoxie utilizes a modified Council–manager form of government. The city mayor along with five council members are elected at-large and serve four-year terms. Appointments of the municipal judge, city attorney, city clerk, and city treasurer are recommended by the mayor and confirmed by the city council. As of January 2020, the current mayor is David Frese and the current city manager is George Brajkovic.

== Notable people ==
- Danni Boatwright, reality TV competitor
- James Fair, chemical engineer, affiliate professor
- Jim Karleskint, Kansas House of Representatives from 2017 to 2020
- Doug McEnulty, professional football player
- Terry Ramsaye, film historian and author
- Roy Zimmerman, professional football player
