= 2024 Westmoreland tornado =

Tornado in Kansas, U.S.

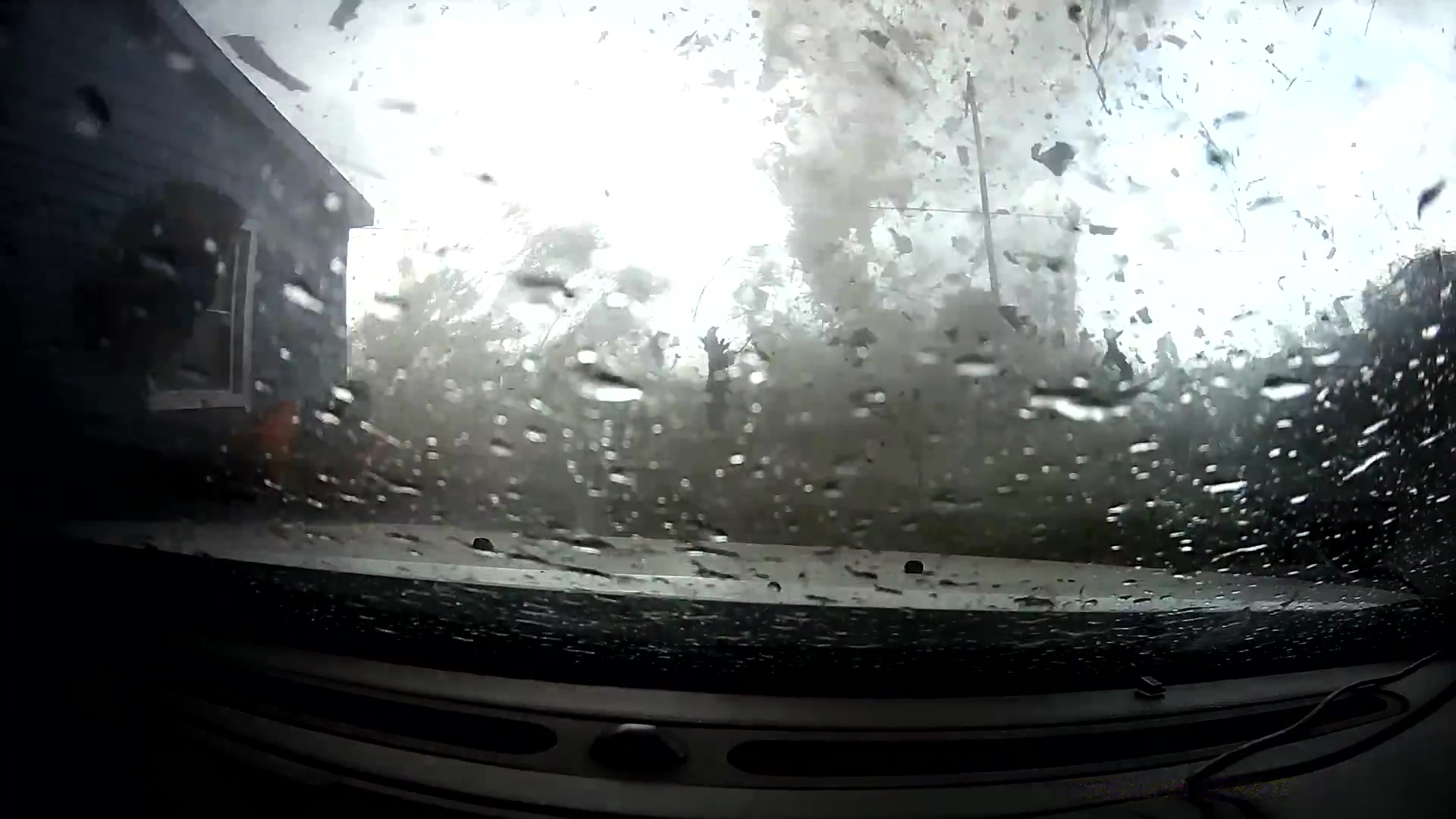
- A dash-cam still showing the tornado as it was tracking through Westmoreland.

Meteorological history
- Formed: April 30, 2024, 4:40 p.m. CDT (UTC−05:00)
- Dissipated: April 30, 2024, 4:48 p.m. CDT (UTC−05:00)
- Duration: 8 minutes

EF3 tornado
- on the Enhanced Fujita scale
- Highest winds: 140 mph (230 km/h)

Overall effects
- Fatalities: 1
- Injuries: 3
- Damage: $2.6 million (2024 USD)
- Part of the Tornadoes of 2024

In the late afternoon hours of April 30, 2024, a strong tornado moved through the northern portions of Westmoreland, a community located in northern Kansas. The tornado, which was on the ground for eight minutes, killed one person and injured three others while producing monetary damage that totaled an estimated $2.6 million (2024 USD). The tornado was the strongest to hit Kansas during the 2024 tornado season, with wind speeds estimated to have been as high as 140 miles per hour (230 km/h) within the funnel.

The tornado first touched down at 5:40 p.m. CDT, inflicting EF2-rated damage to a home and trees as it tracked northeast. To the east of Westmoreland Road the tornado reached EF3 intensity, destroying homes and sweeping debris to the northeast as it moved into higher-populated areas. Along its track through the northern portions of Westmoreland several mobile homes were completely destroyed. After leaving town it appeared to lift, producing little damage before lifting at 5:48 p.m. CDT after tracking for 2.6 miles (4.2 km).

Recovery and aid efforts were intensive immediately following the tornado, with the "Westmoreland Long-Term Recovery Group" being established by the city to help aid residents, and other funds being allotted by those affected. It was found that the tornado sirens in Westmoreland failed; in February 2025, Kansas Representative Sharice Davids introduced the Weather Alert Response and Notification Act after a string of siren failures within the state.

== Advanced forecasting ==
The Day 3 convective outlook, outlined by the Storm Prediction Center (SPC) on April 28, outlined a "slight", level 2-out-of-5 risk for the northern Great Plains. The risk, which included portions of northeast Kansas, Missouri, Nebraska and Iowa was accompanied by a 15% chance of severe weather in the slight risk zone. The SPC noted in the outlook that "possibly a tornado or two" were possible in the risk area. The Day 2 outlook, issued on the morning of April 29, saw an expansion of the "slight" zone and the addition of a "marginal", level 1-out-of-5 risk zone stretching from Texas to Central Minnesota. A 5% risk for tornadoes was introduced in the slight risk zone, as was a 15% "hatched" (Note: A "hatched" risk, as defined by the Storm Prediction Center, is a tool used to outline "a 10% or higher probability for significant severe events within 25 miles of any point".) risk for damaging winds and another hatched, 15% risk for significant hail in the outlined area. A later update to the Day 2 outlook on the evening of April 29 expanded the 5% tornado risk, encompassing much of Eastern Kansas and Western Iowa.

The Day 1 outlook, outlined on April 30, saw the introduction of an "enhanced", level 3-out-of-5 risk for many areas that had previously been included in the slight risk, including northeast Kansas. While the 5% risk for tornadoes largely stayed the same, the SPC denoted a 30% hatched risk for damaging hail for the area.

== Tornado summary ==
Track and intensity map of the tornado through Westmoreland, with triangles indicating damage indicators at a specific location Key 86–110 miles per hour (138–177 km/h) 111–135 miles per hour (179–217 km/h) 136–165 miles per hour (219–266 km/h) ⎯ Center of the tornado

The tornado first touched down at 5:40 p.m. CST west of Wilson Creek Road, reaching EF2 intensity immediately after reaching the ground. A home in this area was hit; the exterior walls of the structure collapsed in the winds. After crossing Bigelow Road the tornado snapped the trunks of hardwood trees, maintaining EF2 intensity as it moved northeast. It weakened shortly before crossing Westmoreland Road, where it would enter into more populated areas. As it entered into the northern portions of Westmoreland it again strengthened, inflicting EF2 damage to a garage and ripping the roof of a house. On North Walnut Street the tornado first reached EF2 intensity, completely destroying several homes and lifting the subfloor of at least one home. Debris from the homes was swept to the northeast by the tornado, although issues with home construction and quality led the National Weather Service to assign a low-end EF3 rating to the residences. Further northeast tree trunks were snapped at EF2 intensity; EF1 damage was inflicted to homes on the tornado's southern edge. The tornado killed one person as it struck several mobile homes along North Fourth Street; one mobile home was found wrapped around a tree. More debris was scattered around by the tornado in this area.

EF2-rated damage to a home on East Campbell Street

The tornado briefly weakened to EF1 strength as it continued northeast, snapping hardwood tree trunks before reaching EF2 intensity as it passed over a property located at 405 East Campbell Street. After crossing K-99 and exiting the east portions of Westmoreland the tornado weakened and "appeared to lift", producing no discernable damage until it lifted near the Rock Creek at 5:48 p.m. CST. The tornado was on the ground for eight minutes, killing one person and injuring three others. The tornado traveled an estimated 2.6 miles (4.2 km) and had a maximum estimated width of 100 yards (91 m). Storm chaser Reed Timmer intercepted and filmed the tornado as it moved through Westmoreland.

== Aftermath and recovery ==
Approximately 22 houses were damaged or destroyed by the tornado, being deemed "unlivable". 13 more businesses were damaged during the event. The Small Business Administration (SBA) offered low-interest federal disaster loans to businesses affected by the tornado. Damage from the tornado received a maximum rating of "EF3" on the Enhanced Fujita scale following a tornado damage survey by the National Weather Service, making the tornado the strongest to occur in Kansas during 2024 and the strongest until a more intense EF3 was confirmed north of Grainfield, Kansas during the tornado outbreak of May 18, 2025.

On May 16, the SBA declared a disaster in the state of Kansas, effective from the date of signing to February 2025. The Red Cross dispatched damage assessors from the Wichita area to Westmoreland to aid in cleanup and recovery efforts.

Shortly after the tornado, the city of Westmoreland created the "Westmoreland Long-Term Recovery Group" to help residents of Westmoreland recover from the event. The city also invoked the "Caring Communities Fund", which allotted over $160,000 to Westmoreland residents who were affected by the tornado.

=== Death and WARN Act ===
The destroyed mobile home where Miller was killed

One person, 58-year-old Ann Miller, was killed in her mobile home on North 4th Street by the tornado. Three others sustained injuries during the event. Tornado sirens in the town reportedly failed to sound.

On February 6, 2025, Representatives Nick Langworthy and Sharice Davids introduced the Weather Alert Response and Notification Act (WARN Act). The act proposes that the Comptroller General of the United States conduct a study on the effectiveness of "emergency alerting systems in disseminating timely and relevant information", specifically on the effectiveness of the effectiveness of various platforms and social media sites, whether guidance and training exist for those issuing emergency alerts, and whether improvements could be made to outdoor siren systems. The act received bipartisan support, with 33 other representatives cosponsoring the bill.

The act proposes that the Comptroller General of the United States conduct a study on the effectiveness of "emergency alerting systems in disseminating timely and relevant information", specifically on the effectiveness of the effectiveness of various platforms and social media sites, whether guidance and training exist for those issuing emergency alerts, and whether improvements could be made to outdoor siren systems. The bill is currently under discussion in the House Transportation Subcommittee on Economic Development, Public Buildings and Emergency Management.

== Other tornadoes ==
Several other tornadoes occurred across the Great Plains region on April 30.

List of confirmed tornadoes – Tuesday, April 30, 2024
EF#	Location	County / Parish	State	Start Coord.	Time (UTC)	Path length	Max width
EFU	ESE of Burrton	Harvey	KS	38°N 97.6°W	21:30–21:45	0.01 mi (0.016 km)	10 yd (9.1 m)
EFU	Multiple pictures of a landspout were taken by trained spotters.						
EF1	SSW of Centralia	Nemaha	KS	39.6627°N 96.2041°W	22:02–22:16	3.19 mi (5.13 km)	75 yd (69 m)
EF1	A high-end EF1 tornado ripped part of the roof off of a home, snapped wooden power poles, and damaged trees.						
EF1	New Cordell	Washita	OK	35.276°N 98.99°W	22:32–22:39	2.53 mi (4.07 km)	200 yd (180 m)
EF1	A high-end EF1 tornado struck southern and east portions of New Cordell, damaging numerous homes and businesses.						
EFU	S of Emmett	Pottawatomie	KS	39.25°N 96.04°W	22:36–22:37	0.25 mi (0.40 km)	20 yd (18 m)
EFU	A storm chaser took a photo of a rope tornado.						
EFU	NNW of Augusta	Butler	KS	37.7234°N 96.993°W	23:23–23:25	0.01 mi (0.016 km)	10 yd (9.1 m)
EFU	A brief tornado touched down. No damage occurred.						
EFU	NW of Grantville	Shawnee	KS	39.129°N 95.641°W	23:34–22:35	0.11 mi (0.18 km)	25 yd (23 m)
EFU	Storm chasers filmed a funnel almost fully condensed over an open field.						
EF1	SE of Perry to Williamstown	Jefferson	KS	39.0594°N 95.3663°W	23:57–00:03	2.15 mi (3.46 km)	75 yd (69 m)
EF1	A high-end EF1 tornado damaged a small farm before striking Williamstown, damaging two homes and snapping or uprooting trees.						
EF0	E of Millerton	Wayne	IA	40.828°N 93.2889°W	00:12–00:16	2.95 mi (4.75 km)	50 yd (46 m)
EF0	A high-end EF0 impacted a large implement shed and an older wooden barn. The shed was destroyed and the barn collapsed. Some trees were downed and minor outbuilding damage also occurred.						
EFU	ESE of Tipton	Tillman	OK	34.4779°N 99.0751°W	00:25–00:39	2.4 mi (3.9 km)	50 yd (46 m)
EFU	A tornado was reported by a storm chaser.						
EF0	SSE of Cooperton	Kiowa	OK	34.8299°N 98.8498°W	00:35	0.5 mi (0.80 km)	100 yd (91 m)
EF0	A landspout-type tornado was observed by storm spotters and storm chasers. No damage was observed.						
EF0	NW of Sedan	Chautauqua	KS	37.1641°N 96.2307°W	01:32–01:35	0.07 mi (0.11 km)	15 yd (14 m)
EF0	A couple of trees were snapped and some branches were broken.						
EF1	NE of Hollister	Tillman	OK	34.362°N 98.832°W	02:32–03:12	6.4 mi (10.3 km)	1,200 yd (1,100 m)
EF1	This large, slow-moving tornado moved through rural areas producing power pole, tree, and outbuilding damage. The tornado hit two farmsteads after turning northeast before turning northwest and dissipating. According to the survey by the NWS office in Norman, Oklahoma, the tornado produced EF1 damage but "may have been much stronger".						
EF1	SSE of Loveland to WNW of Grandfield	Tillman	OK	34.274°N 98.75°W	03:18–03:32	2.15 mi (3.46 km)	200 yd (180 m)
EF1	An anticyclonic tornado damaged some trees. The NWS office in Norman states that this tornado was "likely stronger than the observed damage" in their survey.						

== See also ==
- Weather of 2024
- List of North American tornadoes and tornado outbreaks
- List of United States tornadoes in April 2024
- Greensburg tornado – an EF5 tornado in Kansas in 2007 that also saw the implementation of a "Long-Term Recovery Group"
- List of F3, EF3, and IF3 tornadoes (2020–present)
  - 2021 Fultondale tornado – another EF3 tornado in Alabama where tornado sirens allegedly didn't sound
