= Kentucky Township, Kansas =

Kentucky Township
- Township
- Location in Jefferson County
- Coordinates: 39°06′30″N 95°25′06″W
- Country: United States
- State: Kansas
- County: Jefferson

Area
  - Total: 41.56 sq mi (107.63 km^{2})
  - Land: 36.08 sq mi (93.45 km^{2})
  - Water: 5.47 sq mi (14.18 km^{2}) 13.17%
- Elevation: 850 ft (259 m)

Population (2020)
  - Total: 1,557
  - Density: 43.15/sq mi (16.66/km^{2})
- GNIS feature ID: 0478495

Kentucky Township is a township in Jefferson County, Kansas, United States. As of the 2020 census, its population was 1,557.

== Geography ==
Kentucky Township covers an area of 41.56 square miles (107.63 square kilometers); of this, 5.48 square miles (14.18 square kilometers) or 13.17 percent is water. The streams of Delaware River, Little Wild Horse Creek and Slough Creek run through this township.

=== Communities ===
- Perry
- Medina
- Newman
- Thompsonville

(This list is based on USGS data and may include former settlements.)

=== Adjacent townships ===
- Fairview Township (north)
- Oskaloosa Township (northeast)
- Rural Township (east)
- Lecompton Township, Douglas County (south)
- Kaw Township (west)

=== Cemeteries ===
The township contains three cemeteries: Mount Calvary, Newman and Perry.

=== Major highway ===
- U.S. Route 24
