= Lecompton Road Bridge =

- Coordinates: 39.0488°N 95.3878°W
- Carries: 2 lanes of Lecompton Road
- Crosses: Kansas River
- Locale: Lecompton, Kansas

Characteristics
- Design: Truss(first bridge); Girder (current bridge)

History
- Opened: 1899 (first bridge); 1970 (current bridge)

The Lecompton Road Bridge is a two-lane girder bridge over Kansas River at Lecompton, Kansas, connecting to the nearby town of Perry. The current bridge, opened in 1970, is the second bridge at this location.

Prior to 1898, travel across the Kansas River at Lecompton could only be accomplished by ferry. However, the fluctuations in the river level made the ferry difficult to operate, and in February 1897, the Kansas Legislature authorized Douglas and Jefferson counties to construct a bridge. Construction of the bridge proceeded quickly, and the new bridge was completed in February 1899, with a "bridge celebration" held on June 7.

The bridge was damaged due to floods in 1903, 1905, and 1908. In 1910, an ice jam took out three spans on the north side. The spans were subsequently raised and restored, with the bridge re-opening in 1911.

After the flood of 1951, traffic was restricted on the bridge. By 1965, the bridge was considered too dangerous for school buses to cross, so students had to cross on foot.

Work on the current bridge began in November 1968. The old bridge was razed in 1969, and the current bridge was opened in September 1970.

The bridge deck was replaced in 2007.
