= Jefferson Township, Jefferson County, Kansas =

Jefferson Township
- Township
- Location in Jefferson County
- Coordinates: 39°20′20″N 95°14′36″W
- Country: United States
- State: Kansas
- County: Jefferson

Area
  - Total: 58.25 sq mi (150.87 km^{2})
  - Land: 58.11 sq mi (150.51 km^{2})
  - Water: 0.14 sq mi (0.36 km^{2}) 0.24%
- Elevation: 1,150 ft (350 m)

Population (2020)
  - Total: 1,090
  - Density: 18.8/sq mi (7.24/km^{2})
- GNIS feature ID: 0478243

Jefferson Township is a township in Jefferson County, Kansas, United States. As of the 2020 census, its population was 1,090.

== Geography ==
Jefferson Township covers an area of 58.25 square miles (150.87 square kilometers); of this, 0.14 square miles (0.36 square kilometers) or 0.24 percent is water. The stream of Indian Creek runs through this township.

=== Communities ===
- Winchester
- Boyle
- Dunavant

(This list is based on USGS data and may include former settlements.)

=== Adjacent townships ===
- Easton Township, Leavenworth County (east)
- Alexandria Township, Leavenworth County (southeast)
- Union Township (south)
- Oskaloosa Township (southwest)
- Ozawkie Township (southwest)
- Delaware Township (west)
- Norton Township (northwest)

=== Cemeteries ===
The township contains three cemeteries: Hulls Grove, Spring Grove and Wise.

=== Major highways ===
- U.S. Route 59
- K-16
- K-192
