= Topeka metropolitan area =

Metropolitan area in the United States

Topeka metropolitan area Topeka, Kansas Metropolitan Area
- Metropolitan Statistical Area
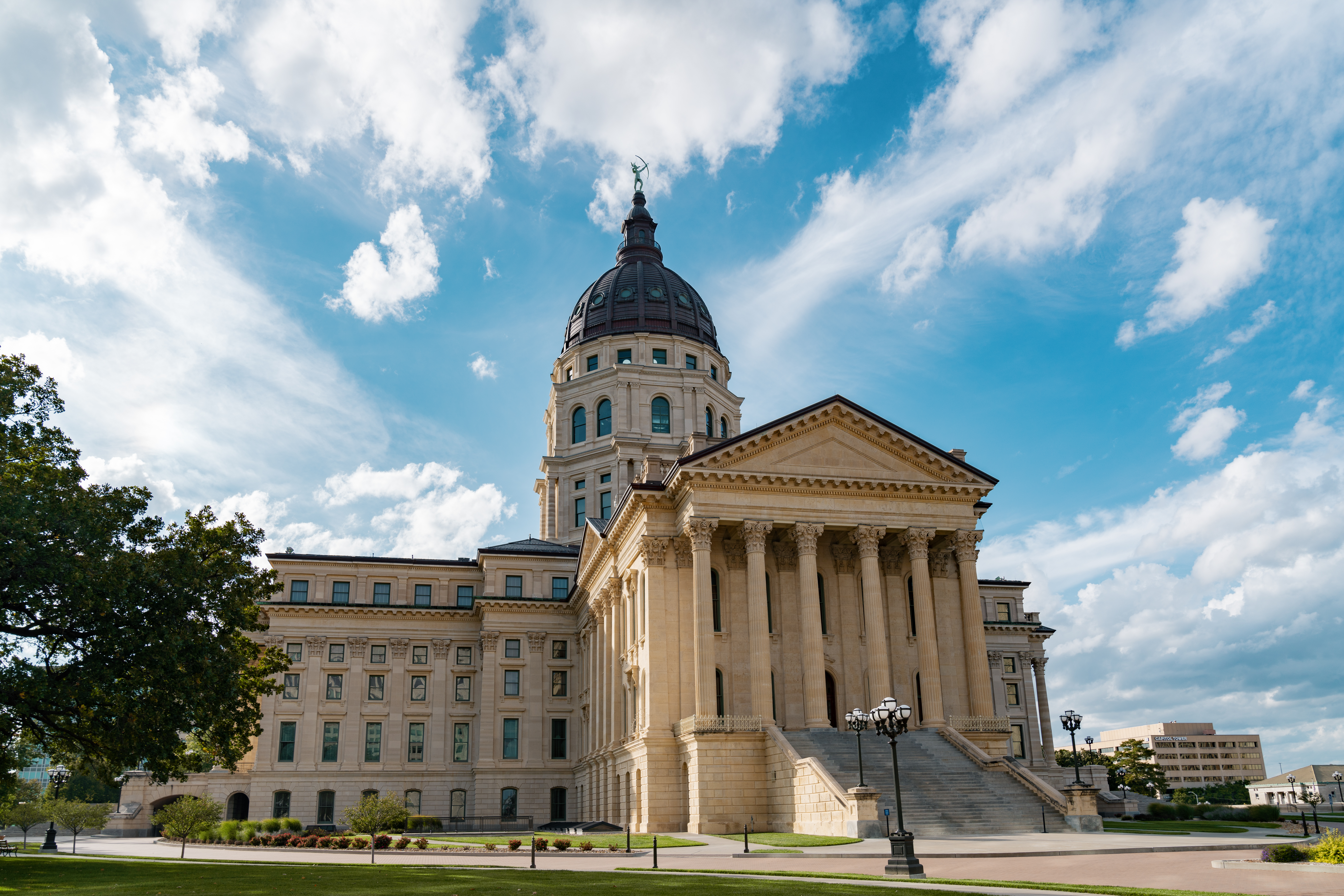
- Kansas State Capitol
Interactive Map of Topeka, KS MSA
City of Topeka
Topeka, KS MSA
- Country: United States
- State: Kansas
- Principal city: Topeka
- Time zone: UTC−6 (CST)
  - Summer (DST): UTC−5 (CDT)

The Topeka Metropolitan Statistical Area, as defined by the United States Census Bureau, is an area consisting of five counties in northeastern Kansas, anchored by the city of Topeka. In total, it has an area of 3,290.15 square miles. As of the 2020 census, the MSA had a population of 233,152.

== Demographics ==
As of the census of 2000, there were 224,551 people, 89,600 households, and 60,052 families residing within the MSA. The racial makeup of the MSA was 85.95% White, 6.95% African American, 1.41% Native American, 0.76% Asian, 0.04% Pacific Islander, 2.53% from other races, and 2.40% from two or more races. Hispanic or Latino of any race were 5.85% of the population.

The median income for a household in the MSA was $41,322, and the median income for a family was $48,124. Males had a median income of $33,251 versus $24,079 for females. The per capita income for the MSA was $18,856.

== Counties ==
- Jackson
- Jefferson
- Osage
- Shawnee
- Wabaunsee

== Communities ==
This is a complete list of all census-recognized municipalities or communities within the Topeka metropolitan area in Kansas. ‡ indicates the community is partially outside the designated Topeka metropolitan area.

=== More than 100,000 ===
- Topeka – Pop: 126,587

=== More than 1,000 ===
- Holton – Pop: 3,401
- Osage City – Pop: 2,861
- St. Marys‡ – Pop: 2,759
- Carbondale – Pop: 1,352
- Silver Lake – Pop: 1,345
- Auburn – Pop: 1,273
- Oskaloosa – Pop: 1,110
- Rossville – Pop: 1,105
- Valley Falls – Pop: 1,092
- Lyndon – Pop: 1,037
- Overbrook – Pop: 1,005

=== 500-1000 ===
- Burlingame – Pop: 971
- McLouth – Pop: 859
- Perry – Pop: 852
- Alma – Pop: 802
- Meriden – Pop: 744
- Tecumseh – Pop: 696
- Scranton – Pop: 653
- Ozawkie – Pop: 638
- Maple Hill – Pop: 631
- Nortonville – Pop: 601
- Hoyt – Pop: 593
- Vassar – Pop: 584

=== Fewer than 500 ===
- Winchester – Pop: 461
- Eskridge – Pop: 439
- Alta Vista – Pop: 409
- Melvern – Pop: 356
- Mayetta – Pop: 348
- Quenemo – Pop: 288
- McFarland – Pop: 272
- Wakarusa – Pop: 242
- Paxico – Pop: 210
- Whiting – Pop: 191
- Grantville – Pop: 182
- Harveyville – Pop: 178
- Circleville – Pop: 153
- Delia – Pop: 151
- Denison – Pop: 146
- Netawaka – Pop: 139
- Wabaunsee – Pop: 104
- Soldier – Pop: 102
- Williamstown – Pop: 96
- Newbury – Pop: 78
- Willard – Pop: 74
- Olivet – Pop: 73

== See also ==
- Kansas census statistical areas
