= Fairview Township, Jefferson County, Kansas =

Fairview Township
- Township
- Location in Jefferson County
- Coordinates: 39°10′50″N 95°25′51″W
- Country: United States
- State: Kansas
- County: Jefferson

Area
  - Total: 34.8 sq mi (90.1 km^{2})
  - Land: 27.06 sq mi (70.09 km^{2})
  - Water: 7.73 sq mi (20.01 km^{2}) 22.21%
- Elevation: 1,053 ft (321 m)

Population (2020)
  - Total: 1,622
  - Density: 59.94/sq mi (23.14/km^{2})
- GNIS feature ID: 0478496

Fairview Township is a township in Jefferson County, Kansas, United States. As of the 2020 census, its population was 1,622.

== Geography ==
Fairview Township covers an area of 34.79 square miles (90.1 square kilometers); of this, 7.72 square miles (20.01 square kilometers) or 22.21 percent is water. The streams of Evans Creek and Little Slough Creek run through this township.

=== Communities ===
- Hilldale
- Hilldale South
- Lake Ridge
- Lakeside Village
- West Shore

(This list is based on USGS data and may include former settlements.)

=== Adjacent townships ===
- Ozawkie Township (north)
- Oskaloosa Township (east)
- Kentucky Township (south)
- Kaw Township (southwest)
- Rock Creek Township (west)

=== Cemeteries ===
The township contains one cemetery, Olive Branch.
