= Union Township, Jefferson County, Kansas =

Union Township
- Township
- Location in Jefferson County
- Coordinates: 39°12′58″N 95°13′03″W
- Country: United States
- State: Kansas
- County: Jefferson

Area
  - Total: 42.83 sq mi (110.92 km^{2})
  - Land: 42.70 sq mi (110.59 km^{2})
  - Water: 0.13 sq mi (0.33 km^{2}) 0.3%
- Elevation: 1,158 ft (353 m)

Population (2020)
  - Total: 1,690
  - Density: 39.6/sq mi (15.3/km^{2})
- GNIS feature ID: 0478347

Union Township is a township in Jefferson County, Kansas, United States. As of the 2020 census, its population was 1,690.

== Geography ==
Union Township covers an area of 42.83 square miles (110.92 square kilometers); of this, 0.13 square miles (0.33 square kilometers) or 0.3 percent is water. The stream of Scatter Creek runs through this township.

=== Communities ===
- McLouth

=== Adjacent townships ===
- Jefferson Township (north)
- Alexandria Township, Leavenworth County (northeast)
- Tonganoxie Township, Leavenworth County (southeast)
- Sarcoxie Township (south)
- Oskaloosa Township (west)

=== Cemeteries ===
The township contains one cemetery, Fowler.

=== Major highways ===
- K-16
- K-92

=== Airports and landing strips ===
- Threshing Bee Airport
