= Rock Creek Township, Jefferson County, Kansas =

Rock Creek Township
- Township
- Location in Jefferson County
- Coordinates: 39°13′N 95°33′W
- Country: United States
- State: Kansas
- County: Jefferson

Area
  - Total: 54.68 sq mi (141.62 km^{2})
  - Land: 54.17 sq mi (140.31 km^{2})
  - Water: 0.50 sq mi (1.3 km^{2}) 0.92%
- Elevation: 981 ft (299 m)

Population (2020)
  - Total: 2,801
  - Density: 51.70/sq mi (19.96/km^{2})
- GNIS feature ID: 0478329

Rock Creek Township is a township in Jefferson County, Kansas, United States. As of the 2020 census, its population was 2,801.

== Geography ==
Rock Creek Township covers an area of 54.68 square miles (141.62 square kilometers); of this, 0.5 square miles (1.3 square kilometers) or 0.92 percent is water. The streams of Claywell Creek, Rock Creek and Tick Creek run through this township.

=== Communities ===
- Meriden
- Rock Creek

(This list is based on USGS data and may include former settlements.)

=== Adjacent townships ===
- Delaware Township (northeast)
- Fairview Township (east)
- Ozawkie Township (east)
- Kaw Township (south)
- Soldier Township, Shawnee County (southwest)
- Douglas Township, Jackson County (west)

=== Major highways ===
- K-4
- K-92
