= Rural Township, Jefferson County, Kansas =

Rural Township
- Township
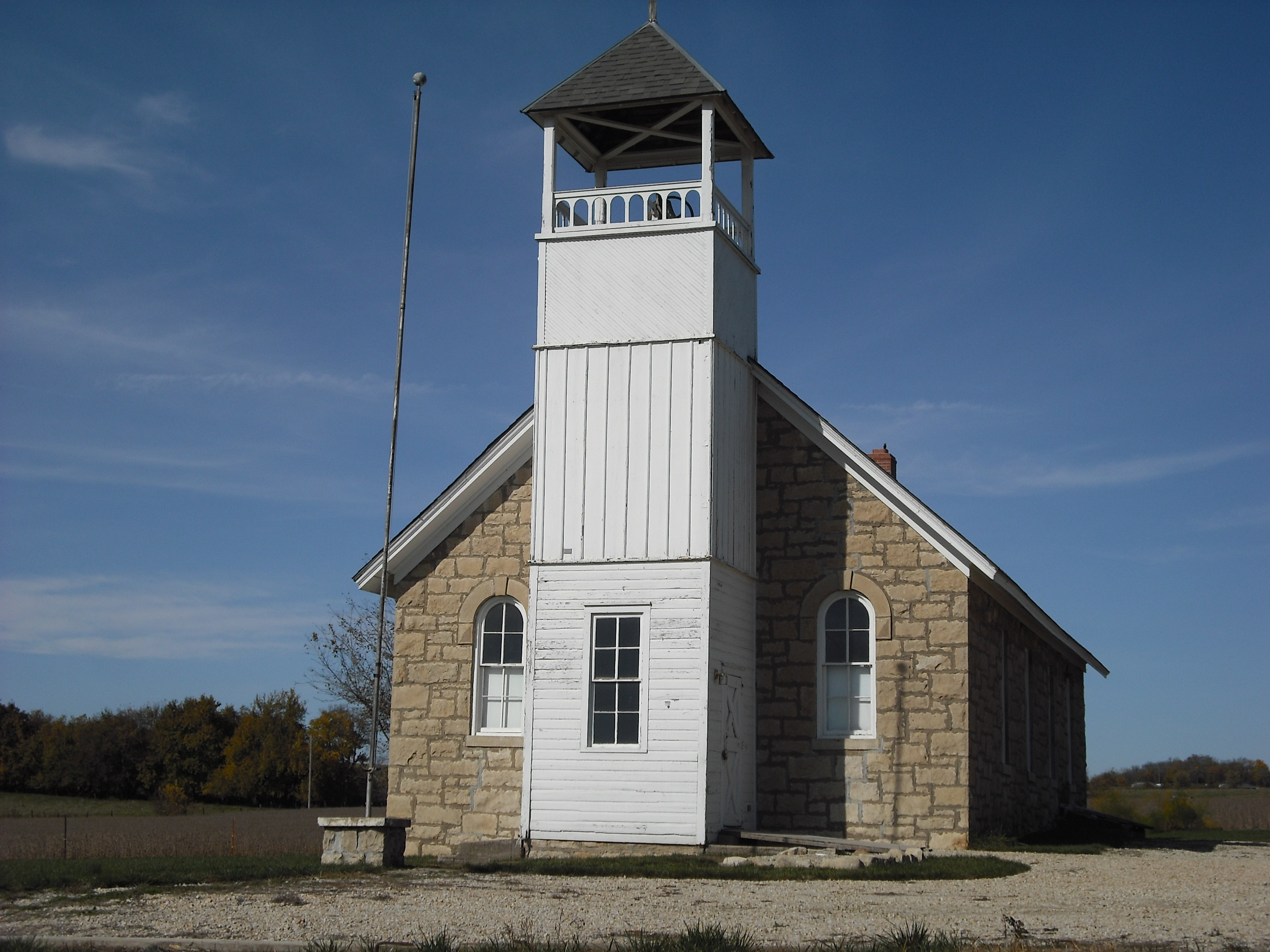
- Buck Creek School east of Williamstown

- Location in Jefferson County
- Coordinates: 39°05′45″N 95°17′56″W
- Country: United States
- State: Kansas
- County: Jefferson

Area
  - Total: 32.19 sq mi (83.37 km^{2})
  - Land: 31.82 sq mi (82.42 km^{2})
  - Water: 0.37 sq mi (0.95 km^{2}) 1.14%
- Elevation: 1,047 ft (319 m)

Population (2020)
  - Total: 776
  - Density: 24.4/sq mi (9.42/km^{2})
- GNIS feature ID: 0478497

Rural Township is a township in Jefferson County, Kansas, United States. It was formed in 1871, from the territory of Kentucky Township and Sarcoxie Township. As of the 2020 census, its population was 776.

== Geography ==
Rural Township covers an area of 32.19 square miles (83.37 square kilometers); of this, 0.37 square miles (0.95 square kilometers) or 1.14 percent is water. The streams of Buck Creek, East Stone House Creek, Stone Horse Creek and West Stone House Creek run through this township.

=== Communities ===
- Buck Creek
- Williamstown

(This list is based on USGS data and may include former settlements.)

=== Adjacent townships ===
- Oskaloosa Township (north)
- Sarcoxie Township (east)
- Grant Township, Douglas County (southeast)
- Wakarusa Township, Douglas County (south)
- Lecompton Township, Douglas County (southwest)
- Kentucky Township (west)

=== Cemeteries ===
The township contains three cemeteries: Buster, Holliday and Underwood.

=== Major highways ===
- U.S. Route 24
- U.S. Route 59
