= Mooney Creek, Kansas =

Unincorporated community in Kansas, U.S.

Coordinates: 39°23′25″N 95°13′02″W

Mooney Creek is an unincorporated community in northeastern Jefferson County, Kansas, United States. It is named for Mooney Creek, a right-hand tributary of Big Stranger Creek.

== History ==
The first settler was said to be a man named Thomas Mooney, who arrived there not long after the Kansas Territory was opened up for settlement in 1854. The first Catholic Church in the area, Corpus Christi, was founded as a mission parish in 1857 and held services in the homes of parishioners, with the first church built in 1872. The present church was built in 1907 and still stands today.

== Demographics ==
Mooney Creek is part of the Topeka, Kansas Metropolitan Statistical Area.
