= Delaware Township, Jefferson County, Kansas =

Delaware Township
- Township
- Location in Jefferson County
- Coordinates: 39°21′45″N 95°28′46″W
- Country: United States
- State: Kansas
- County: Jefferson

Area
  - Total: 88.54 sq mi (229.31 km^{2})
  - Land: 88.44 sq mi (229.06 km^{2})
  - Water: 0.097 sq mi (0.25 km^{2}) 0.11%
- Elevation: 945 ft (288 m)

Population (2020)
  - Total: 1,802
  - Density: 20.38/sq mi (7.867/km^{2})
- GNIS feature ID: 0478222

Delaware Township is a township in Jefferson County, Kansas, United States. As of the 2020 census, its population was 1,802.

== Geography ==
Delaware Township covers an area of 88.54 square miles (229.31 square kilometers); of this, 0.1 square miles (0.25 square kilometers) or 0.11 percent is water. The streams of Brush Creek, Cedar Creek, Coal Creek, Johannes Branch, North Cedar Creek, North Walnut Creek, Peter Creek, Rock Creek, South Cedar Creek and Walnut Creek run through this township.

=== Communities ===
- Valley Falls
- Half Mound

(This list is based on USGS data and may include former settlements.)

=== Adjacent townships ===
- Kapioma Township, Atchison County (north)
- Benton Township, Atchison County (northeast)
- Jefferson Township (east)
- Norton Township (east)
- Ozawkie Township (southeast)
- Douglas Township, Jackson County (southwest)
- Rock Creek Township (southwest)
- Cedar Township, Jackson County (west)
- Garfield Township, Jackson County (northwest)

=== Cemeteries ===
The township contains four cemeteries: Farrar, Graggs Chapel, Rose Hill and Saint Marys.

=== Major highways ===
- K-4
- K-16
