= Norton Township, Kansas =

Norton Township
- Township
- Location in Jefferson County
- Coordinates: 39°23′00″N 95°19′11″W
- Country: United States
- State: Kansas
- County: Jefferson

Area
  - Total: 39.06 sq mi (101.17 km^{2})
  - Land: 38.95 sq mi (100.87 km^{2})
  - Water: 0.12 sq mi (0.3 km^{2}) 0.3%
- Elevation: 1,135 ft (346 m)

Population (2020)
  - Total: 859
  - Density: 22.1/sq mi (8.52/km^{2})
- GNIS feature ID: 0478223

Norton Township is a township in Jefferson County, Kansas, United States. As of the 2020 census, its population was 859.

== Geography ==
Norton Township covers an area of 39.06 square miles (101.17 square kilometers); of this, 0.12 square miles (0.3 square kilometers) or 0.3 percent is water. The streams of Howard Creek and Hulls Branch run through this township.

=== Communities ===
- Nortonville

=== Adjacent townships ===
- Center Township, Atchison County (north)
- Mount Pleasant Township, Atchison County (northeast)
- Easton Township, Leavenworth County (east)
- Jefferson Township (southeast)
- Delaware Township (west)
- Benton Township, Atchison County (northwest)

=== Cemeteries ===
The township contains three cemeteries: Corpus Christi, Nortonville, and Saint Josephs.

=== Major highways ===
- U.S. Route 59
- U.S. Route 159
- K-4
