= Perry–Lecompton USD 343 =

School district in Kansas

Address
- 205 W. Bridge St Perry, Kansas, 66073; United States

District information
- Type: Public
- Grades: Pre-K to 12
- Schools: 4

Other information
- Website: usd343.net

Perry–Lecompton USD 343 is a public unified school district headquartered in Perry, Kansas, United States. The district includes the communities of Perry, Lecompton, Grantville, Williamstown, small portion of Lawrence, and nearby rural areas of southern Jefferson County and northwestern Douglas County.

== Schools ==
The district has four schools in three buildings:

- Perry-Lecompton High School, located in Perry, serves grades 9–12.
- Perry-Lecompton Middle School, located in Perry, serves grades 5-8 and is part of the PLHS Building.
- Lecompton Elementary School serves grades 3–4, located in Lecompton.
- Perry Elementary School serves grades PreK-2, located in Perry.

The district previously owned and operate schools in Grantville and Williamstown, but closed due to money constraints. The school in Williamstown is now used by the Williamstown Assembly of God, and the school in Grantville has been torn down.

== See also ==
- List of high schools in Kansas
- List of unified school districts in Kansas
- Kansas State Department of Education
- Kansas State High School Activities Association
