= Williamstown, Kansas =

- CDP
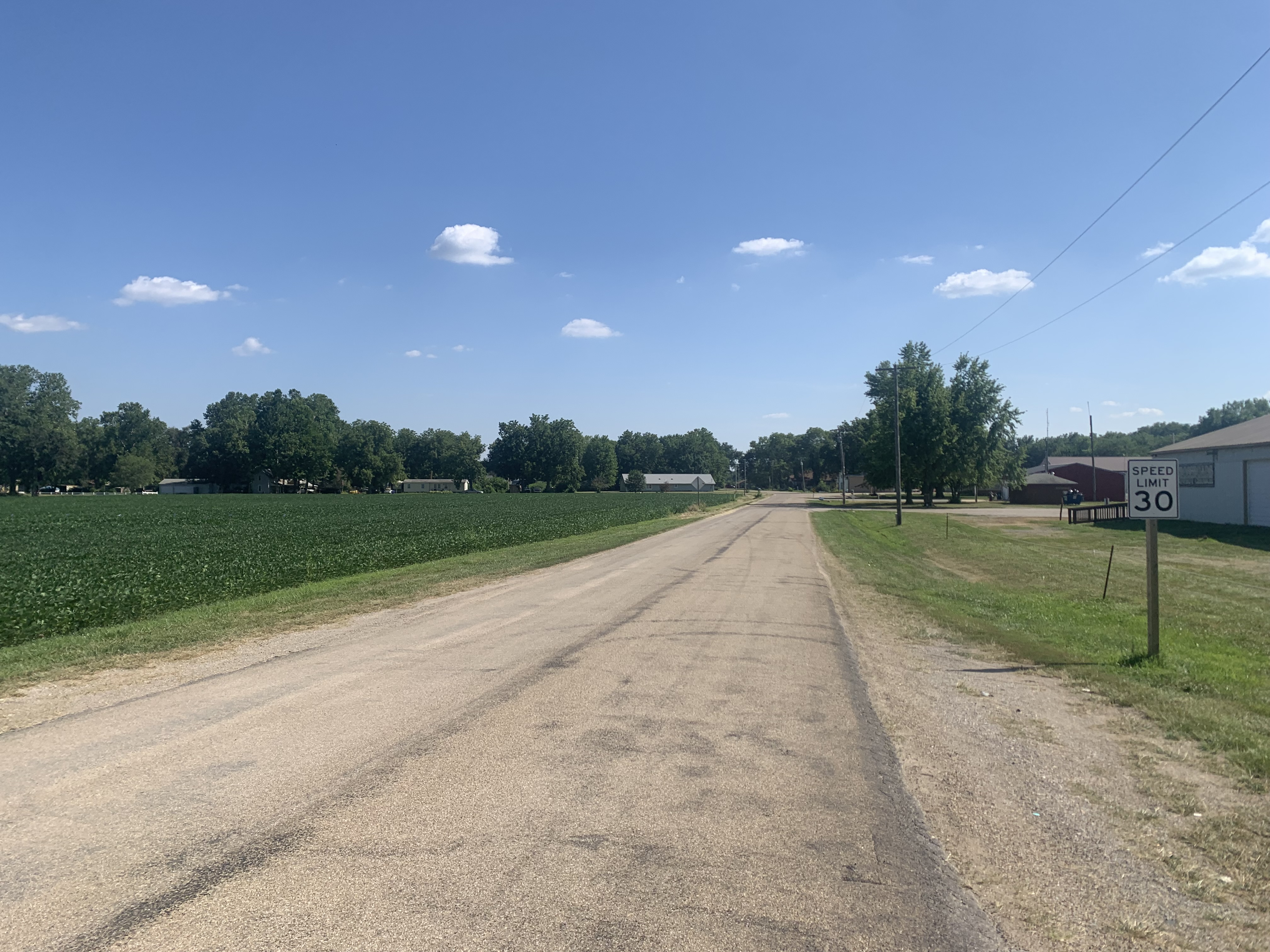
- Williamstown from Oak Street, facing south (2025)

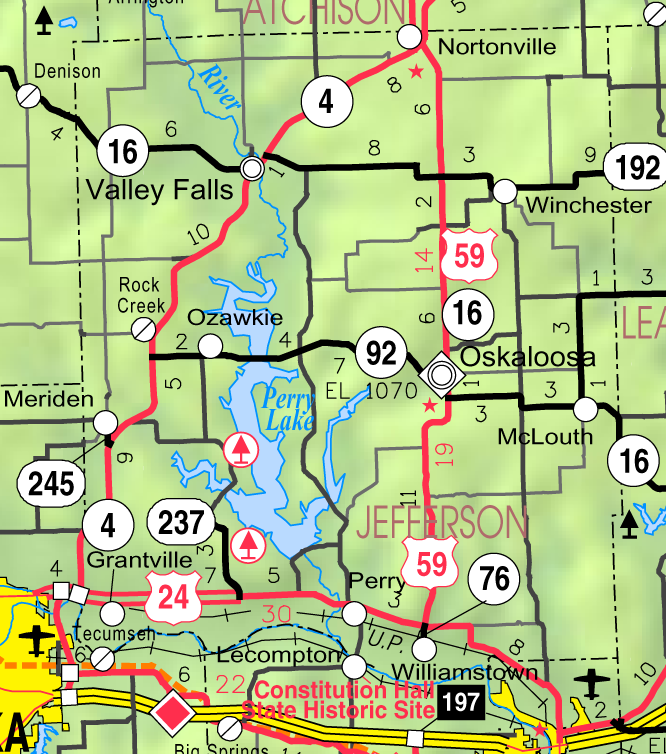
- KDOT map of Jefferson County (legend)

- Location within Kansas Location within the United States
- Coordinates: 39°3′46″N 95°19′58″W
- Country: United States
- State: Kansas
- County: Jefferson
- Founded: 1865
- Elevation: 850 ft (260 m)

Population (2020)
  - Total: 96
- Time zone: UTC-6 (CST)
  - Summer (DST): UTC-5 (CDT)
- Area code: 785
- FIPS code: 20-79375
- GNIS ID: 478821

Williamstown is a census-designated place (CDP) in southeastern Jefferson County, Kansas, United States. As of the 2020 census, the population was 96. It is located south of the junction of US-24 and US-59.

== History ==
=== Kaw Agency and Chief White Plume ===
In 1825, the U.S. Government built a stone house for Chief White Plume, the Kaw chief from the band known as the Half-breeds. Kaw Half-Breed Tract #23 became the site of the Kaw Agency in 1827. The house was located approximately 50 yards north of the Kansas Pacific depot. By time the town was platted in 1865, the stone house was in disrepair. However, the creek named after the old stone house was still a good place to settle, and so Williamstown was founded on its banks in 1865.

=== Founding ===
Williamstown was founded in 1865 in the Kansas River valley near the Kansas Pacific Railway and on the banks of Stone House Creek by local property owners Mapes, Williams & Moore. It was originally in the territory of Sarcoxie Township, and then part of Rural Township when it was formed in 1871. The first store was opened in 1865 by Samuel Mitchell. A sawmill was established south of the railroad, and the town began to grow slowly. It had a post office, railroad depot, and schoolhouse. The town had trouble growing in the early years because of the establishment by railroad officials of the town of Perry, three miles to the West.

=== Notable events ===
==== Early murders ====
In the early years of Williamstown's settlement, three particularly brutal murders were committed there. The perpetrators were never found.

==== 1893 tornado ====
On June 21, 1893, at around 7 pm, Williamstown was devastated by a tornado. The tornado passed southeast through Williamstown and the surrounding area. It left a track one-half mile wide and six miles long. The tornado was particularly violent, destroying everything in its path and knocking over headstones in Underwood Cemetery. At least 15 people were killed instantly, and many more injured. In several cases, bodies had been found decapitated or missing limbs, sometimes up to three miles away from their homes. The injured were tended to by physicians gathered at Perry, while residents of Perry and Lawrence assisted in the search and rescue efforts throughout the night of the 21st and day of the 22nd. On the Sunday following the tornado, the Union Pacific ran several special trains to Williamstown for people to see the damage.

==== Floods ====
In 1903, cities all along the Kansas River were inundated by flood waters, with Williamstown being hit on May 31. The water supposedly reached from bluff to bluff along the whole width of the river valley. As telephone was not available in the area, many people lost livestock and property due to the very short notice. The area was again hit in the Great Flood of 1951, with much more devastating effect to property.

== Demographics ==
Historical population
Census	Pop.	Note	%±
2020	96		—
U.S. Decennial Census

== Education ==
The community is served by Perry–Lecompton USD 343 public school district. The old Williamstown Elementary closed in 2009 and children currently attend schools in Perry and Lecompton. The school is now the Williamstown Assembly of God.
