= Ozawkie Township, Kansas =

Ozawkie Township
- Township
- Location in Jefferson County
- Coordinates: 39°15′35″N 95°25′51″W
- Country: United States
- State: Kansas
- County: Jefferson

Area
  - Total: 42.78 sq mi (110.79 km^{2})
  - Land: 37.33 sq mi (96.68 km^{2})
  - Water: 5.45 sq mi (14.11 km^{2}) 12.74%
- Elevation: 1,020 ft (311 m)

Population (2020)
  - Total: 1,628
  - Density: 43.61/sq mi (16.84/km^{2})
- GNIS feature ID: 0478336

Ozawkie Township is a township in Jefferson County, Kansas, United States. As of the 2020 census, its population was 1,628.

== Geography ==
Ozawkie Township covers an area of 42.78 square miles (110.79 square kilometers); of this, 5.45 square miles (14.11 square kilometers) or 12.74 percent is water. The streams of Bowies Branch, Duck Creek, Fishpond Creek and French Creek run through this township.

=== Communities ===
- Ozawkie
- Indian Ridge
- Lake Shore

(This list is based on USGS data and may include former settlements.)

=== Adjacent townships ===
- Jefferson Township (northeast)
- Oskaloosa Township (east)
- Fairview Township (south)
- Rock Creek Township (west)
- Delaware Township (northwest)

=== Cemeteries ===
The township contains one cemetery, Fairview.

=== Major highways ===
- K-4
- K-92
