= Oskaloosa Township, Kansas =

Oskaloosa Township
- Township
- Location in Jefferson County
- Coordinates: 39°12′58″N 95°18′39″W
- Country: United States
- State: Kansas
- County: Jefferson

Area
  - Total: 57.61 sq mi (149.21 km^{2})
  - Land: 57.52 sq mi (148.97 km^{2})
  - Water: 0.097 sq mi (0.25 km^{2}) 0.17%
- Elevation: 1,102 ft (336 m)

Population (2020)
  - Total: 2,167
  - Density: 37.68/sq mi (14.55/km^{2})
- GNIS feature ID: 0478346

Oskaloosa Township is a township in Jefferson County, Kansas, United States. As of the 2020 census, its population was 2,167.

== Geography ==
Oskaloosa Township covers an area of 57.61 square miles (149.21 square kilometers); of this, 0.1 square miles (0.25 square kilometers) or 0.17 percent is water. The streams of Burr Oak Branch, Honey Creek, and Little Buck Creek run through this township.

=== Communities ===
- Oskaloosa (the county seat)

=== Adjacent townships ===
- Jefferson Township (northeast)
- Union Township (east)
- Sarcoxie Township (southeast)
- Rural Township (south)
- Kentucky Township (southwest)
- Fairview Township (west)
- Ozawkie Township (west)

=== Cemeteries ===
The township contains two cemeteries: Pleasant View and Plum Grove.

=== Major highways ===
- U.S. Route 59
- K-16
- K-92

=== Airports and landing strips ===
- Flying T Airport
- Shomin Airport
