= Josh Billings (catcher) =

American baseball player (1891–1981)

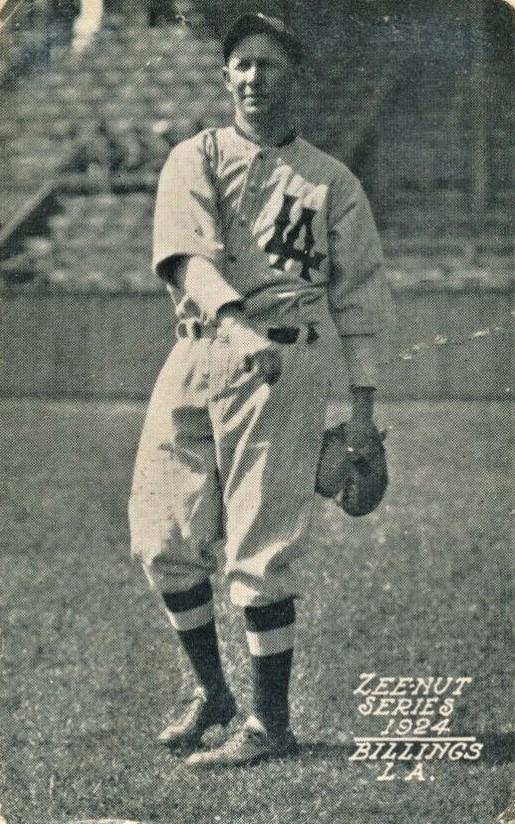
- Catcher
- Born: November 30, 1891; Grantville, Kansas, U.S.
- Died: December 30, 1981 (aged 90); Santa Monica, California, U.S.
- Batted: Right Threw: Right

MLB debut
- September 9, 1913, for the Cleveland Naps

Last MLB appearance
- June 16, 1923, for the St. Louis Browns

MLB statistics
- Batting average: .217
- Home runs: 0
- Runs batted in: 29
- Stats at Baseball Reference

Teams
- Cleveland Naps/Indians (1913–1918); St. Louis Browns (1919–1923)

John Augustus "Josh" Billings (November 30, 1891 – December 30, 1981) was an American backup catcher in Major League Baseball who played for three different teams between the 1913 and 1923 seasons. Listed at 5 ft 11 in (1.80 m), 165 lb., Billings batted and threw right-handed. He was born in Grantville, Kansas.

Before playing professional baseball, Billings was a star player at Kansas State University (1910) and Oklahoma State University (1911–12).

Billings played from 1913 to 1918 for the Cleveland Naps (renamed the Indians in 1915). In 1919, he was traded to the St. Louis Browns in exchange for Les Nunamaker. In St. Louis he received considerably more playing time than he had in Cleveland. His most productive season came in 1920, when he posted career-numbers in batting average (.277), runs (19) and RBI (11), while matching a career-high 66 games played and finishing seventh in the American League in hit by pitches (7). He was a career .217 hitter in 243 games.

In 1943 Billings managed the Kenosha Comets, one of the four original teams of the All-American Girls Professional Baseball League, and led his team to the playoffs in that season.

Billings died in Santa Monica, California, at the age of 90.
