= Rock Creek, Kansas =

- Unincorporated community
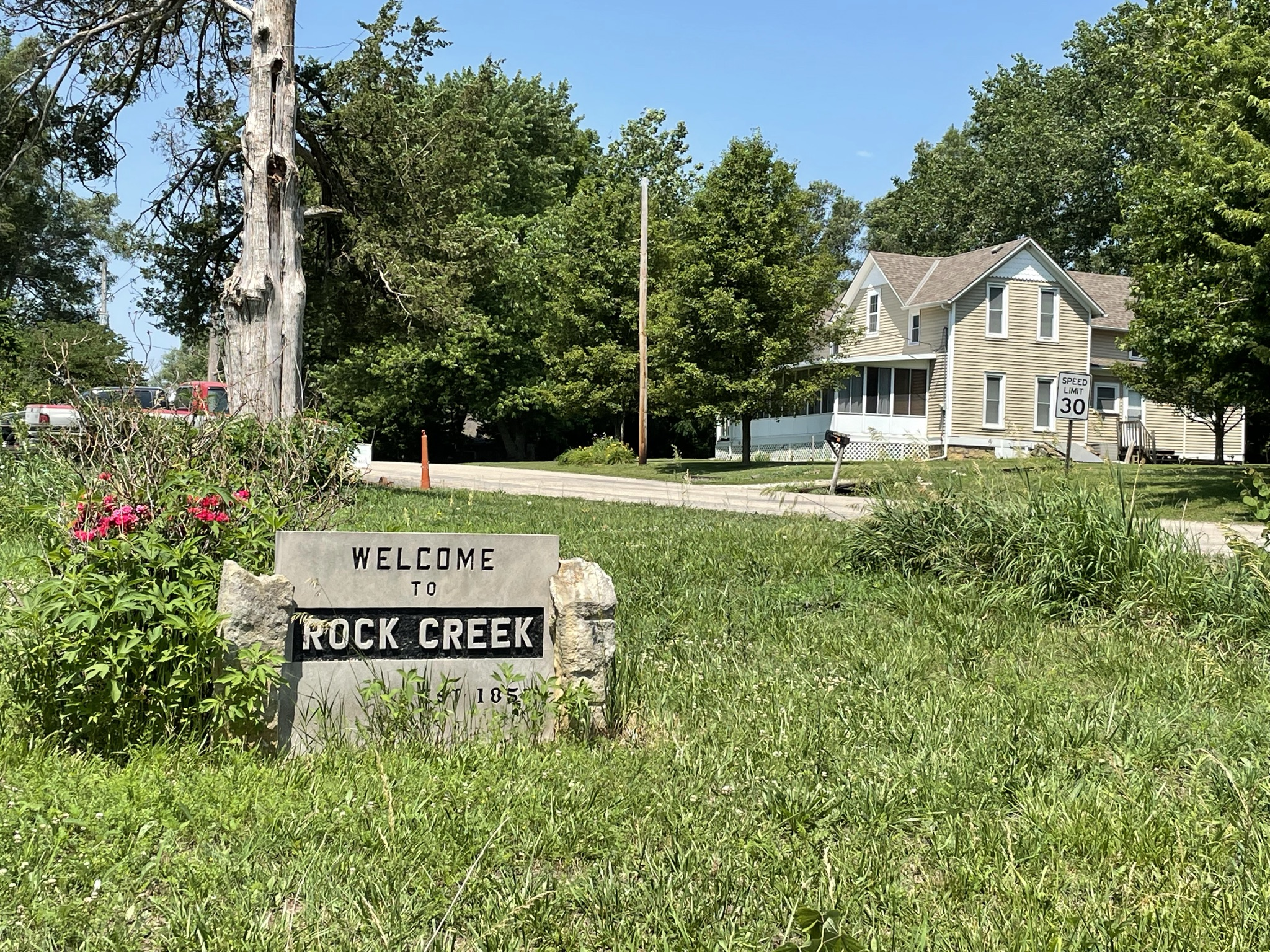
- Welcome sign (2021)

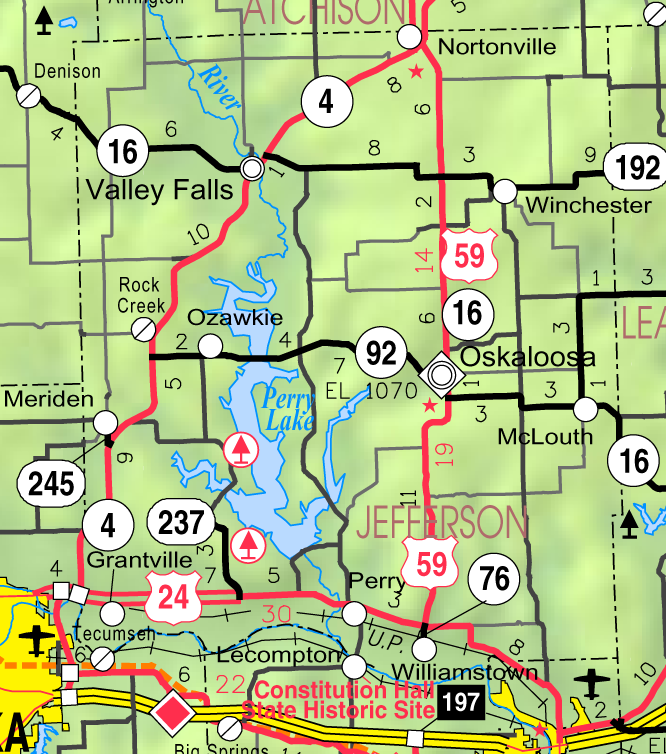
- KDOT map of Jefferson County (legend)

- Location within Kansas Location within the United States
- Coordinates: 39°14′44.99″N 95°32′13.92″W
- Country: United States
- State: Kansas
- County: Jefferson
- Township: Rock Creek
- Founded: 1857
- Elevation: 1,099 ft (335 m)
- Time zone: UTC-6 (CST)
  - Summer (DST): UTC-5 (CDT)
- Area code: 785
- FIPS code: 20-60550
- GNIS ID: 478479

Rock Creek is an unincorporated community in Rock Creek Township, Jefferson County, Kansas, United States. It is located along 110th Road near its intersection with K-4.

== History ==
Rock Creek was established in 1857 and by the 1870s became a stop on the Atchison, Topeka and Santa Fe Railway. In 1872, a post office was established. The town continued to grow and by 1910 had a few general stores and a telegraph office. In 1927, K-4 was established and went through the town along Rock Creek Road. In 1959 the post office closed and in the 1960s K-4 was re-routed to the east of Rock Creek. Finally, by 1996 the Atchison, Topeka and Santa Fe Railway had ceased operations and pulled up the tracks that used to run through the community.

== Education ==
The community is served by Jefferson West USD 340 public school district.
