= Newman, Kansas =

Unincorporated community in Kansas, U.S.

- Unincorporated community
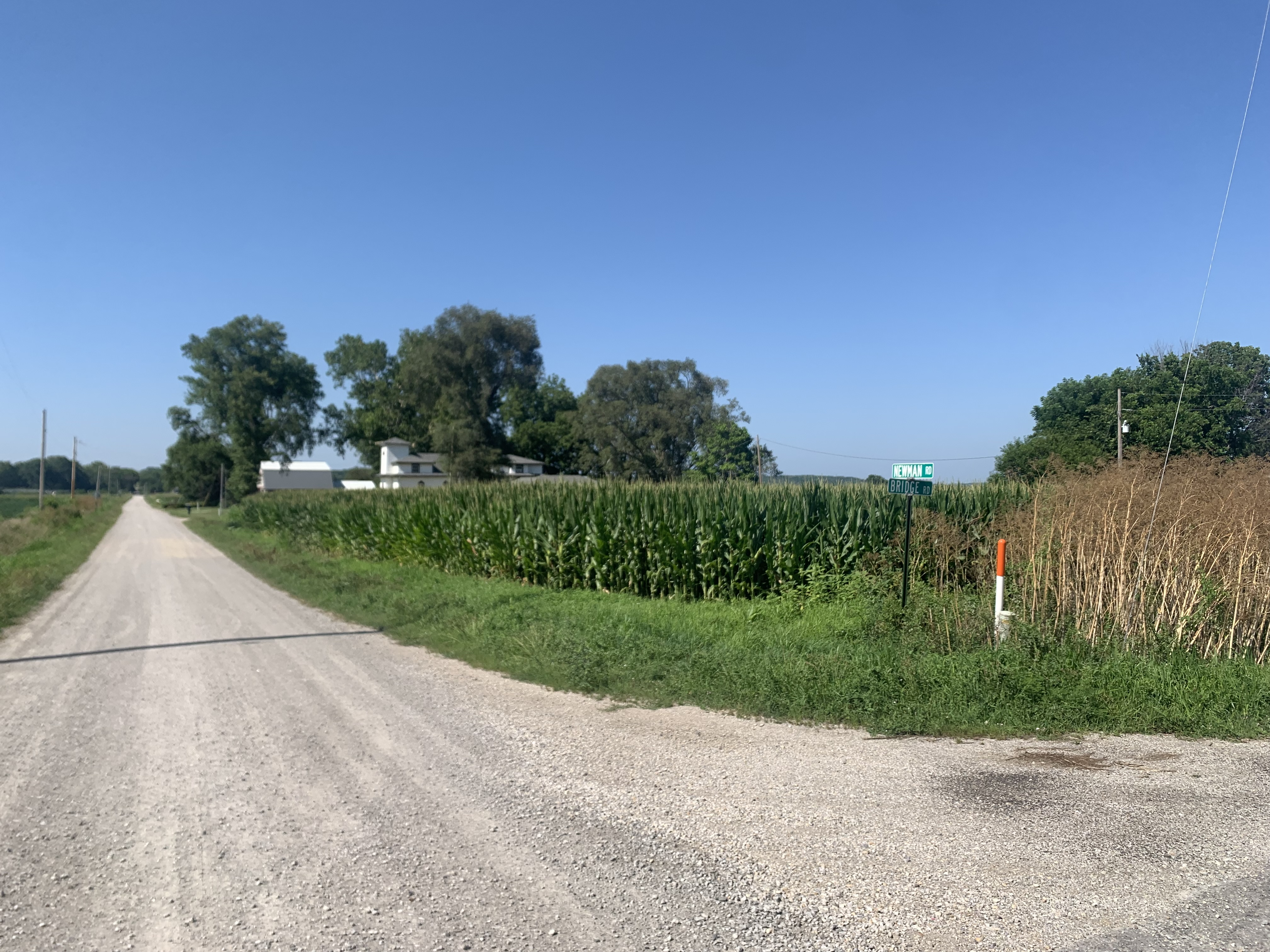
- Newman at junction between Bridge and Newman Road (2025)

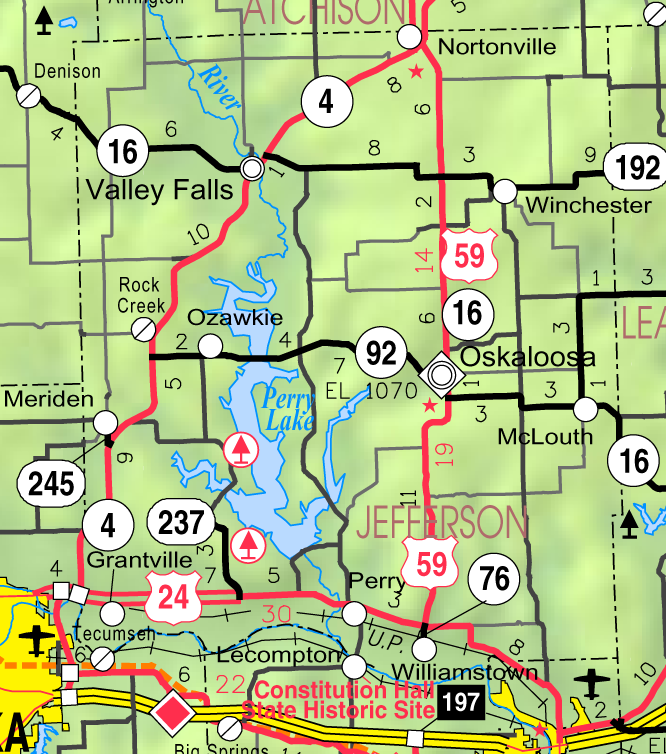
- KDOT map of Jefferson County (legend)

- Location within Kansas Location within the United States
- Coordinates: 39°04′50″N 95°27′53″W
- Country: United States
- State: Kansas
- County: Jefferson
- Township: Kentucky
- Founded: 1867
- Named for: H. L. Newman
- Elevation: 863 ft (263 m)
- Time zone: UTC-6 (CST)
  - Summer (DST): UTC-5 (CDT)
- Area code: 785
- FIPS code: 20-50400
- GNIS ID: 478808

Newman is an unincorporated community in southern Jefferson County, United States.

== History ==
Newman was laid out in 1867.

A post office was opened in Newman in 1868 and remained in operation until it was closed in 1969.

== See also ==
- Perry Lake and Perry State Park
