= Boyle, Kansas =

Unincorporated community in Kansas, U.S.

Coordinates: 39°20′25″N 95°21′10″W

Boyle is an unincorporated community in Jefferson County, Kansas, United States.

== History ==
A post office in Boyle opened in 1872, closed temporarily in 1882, reopened in 1884, and closed permanently in 1945.
