= Nortonville, Kansas =

- City
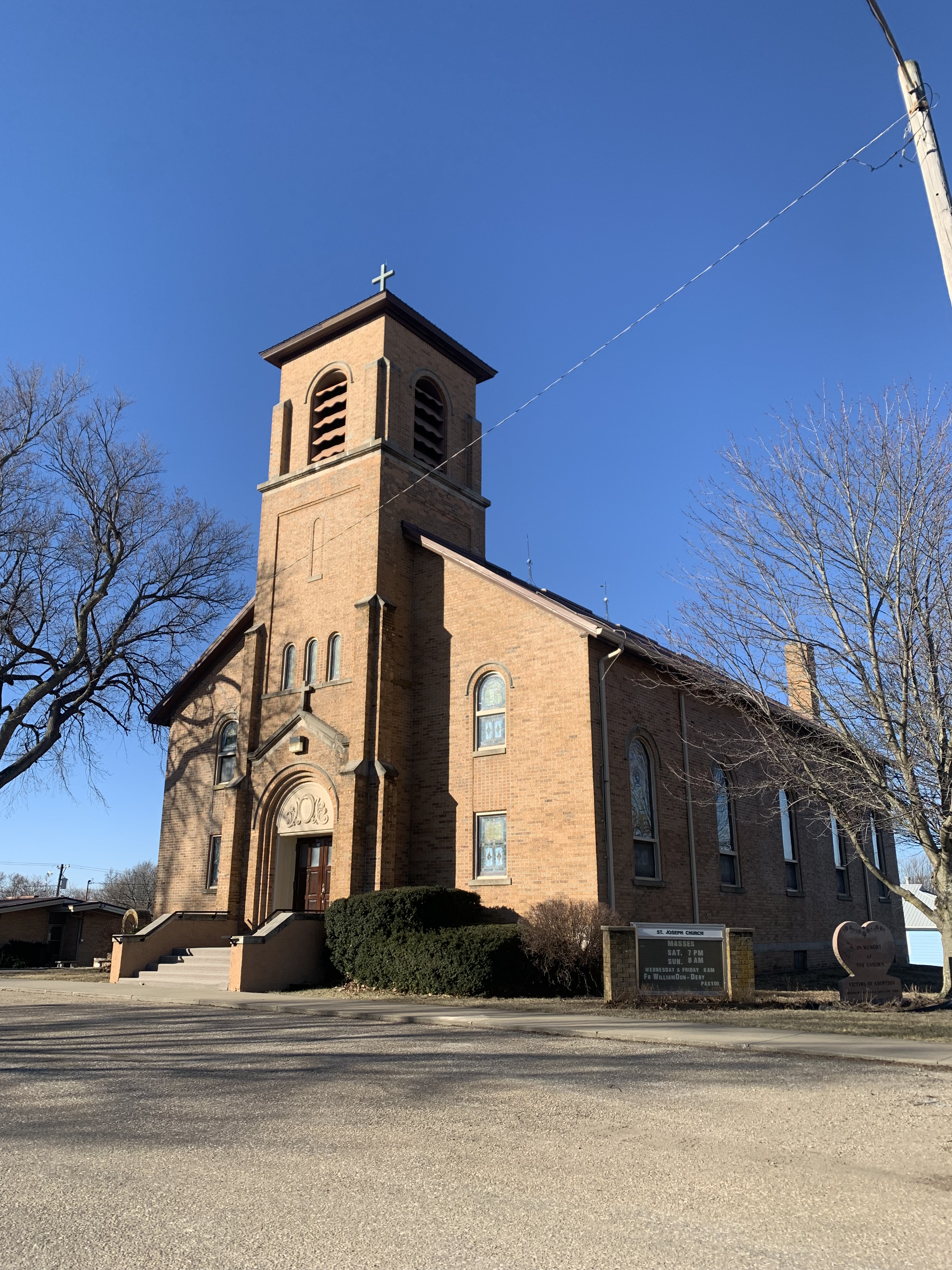
- St Joseph Church in Nortonville (2026)

- Location within Jefferson County and Kansas

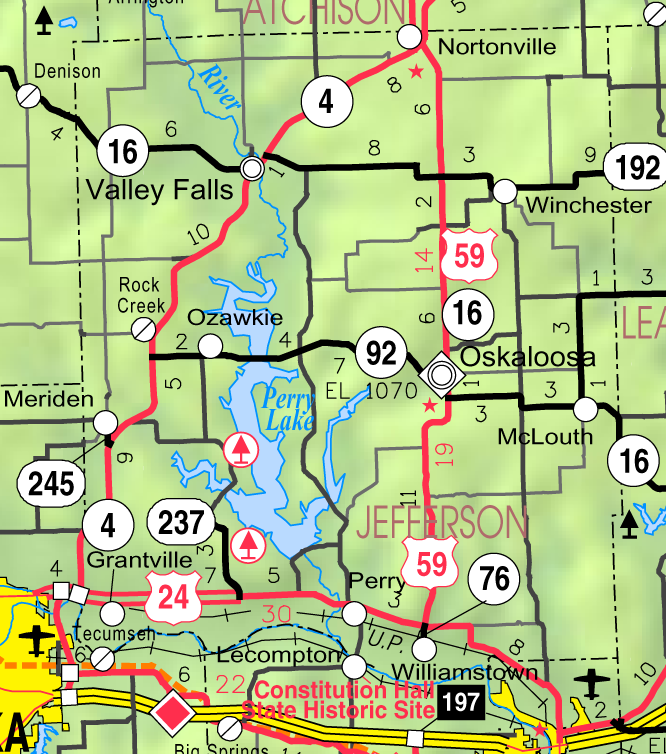
- KDOT map of Jefferson County (legend)
- Coordinates: 39°25′3″N 95°19′54″W
- Country: United States
- State: Kansas
- County: Jefferson
- Platted: 1873
- Incorporated: 1884
- Named for: L. Norton, Jr

Area
  - Total: 0.44 sq mi (1.15 km^{2})
  - Land: 0.43 sq mi (1.12 km^{2})
  - Water: 0.012 sq mi (0.03 km^{2})
- Elevation: 1,161 ft (354 m)

Population (2020)
  - Total: 601
  - Density: 1,390/sq mi (537/km^{2})
- Time zone: UTC-6 (CST)
  - Summer (DST): UTC-5 (CDT)
- ZIP Code: 66060
- Area code: 913
- FIPS code: 20-51525
- GNIS ID: 478236
- Website: nortonvilleks.com

Nortonville is a city in Jefferson County, Kansas, United States. As of the 2020 census, the population of the city was 601.

== History ==
Nortonville was platted in 1873. It was named for L. Norton, Jr., a railroad employee. The first post office in Nortonville was established in May 1873.

In the 1900s, Nortonville was reported to be one of three sundown towns in the state, where African Americans were not allowed to reside.

== Geography ==
Nortonville is located at 39°25′3″N 95°19′54″W (39.417496, -95.331626). According to the United States Census Bureau, the city has a total area of 0.45 square miles (1.17 km^{2}), of which 0.44 square miles (1.14 km^{2}) is land and 0.01 square miles (0.03 km^{2}) is water.

== Demographics ==
Historical population
| Census | Pop. | Note | %± |
|---|---|---|---|
| 1880 | 350 | | — |
| 1890 | 669 | | 91.1% |
| 1900 | 700 | | 4.6% |
| 1910 | 638 | | −8.9% |
| 1920 | 696 | | 9.1% |
| 1930 | 606 | | −12.9% |
| 1940 | 562 | | −7.3% |
| 1950 | 568 | | 1.1% |
| 1960 | 595 | | 4.8% |
| 1970 | 727 | | 22.2% |
| 1980 | 692 | | −4.8% |
| 1990 | 643 | | −7.1% |
| 2000 | 620 | | −3.6% |
| 2010 | 637 | | 2.7% |
| 2020 | 601 | | −5.7% |
U.S. Decennial Census

Nortonville is part of the Topeka, Kansas Metropolitan Statistical Area.

=== 2020 census ===
The 2020 United States census counted 601 people, 219 households, and 146 families in Nortonville. The population density was 1,394.4 per square mile (538.4/km^{2}). There were 255 housing units at an average density of 591.6 per square mile (228.4/km^{2}). The racial makeup was 92.68% (557) white or European American (91.18% non-Hispanic white), 0.67% (4) black or African-American, 1.0% (6) Native American or Alaska Native, 0.0% (0) Asian, 0.0% (0) Pacific Islander or Native Hawaiian, 0.33% (2) from other races, and 5.32% (32) from two or more races. Hispanic or Latino of any race was 3.16% (19) of the population.

Of the 219 households, 33.3% had children under the age of 18; 54.3% were married couples living together; 20.5% had a female householder with no spouse or partner present. 28.3% of households consisted of individuals and 14.6% had someone living alone who was 65 years of age or older. The average household size was 2.7 and the average family size was 3.0. The percent of those with a bachelor's degree or higher was estimated to be 14.3% of the population.

28.8% of the population was under the age of 18, 5.0% from 18 to 24, 24.1% from 25 to 44, 22.8% from 45 to 64, and 19.3% who were 65 years of age or older. The median age was 39.4 years. For every 100 females, there were 97.7 males. For every 100 females ages 18 and older, there were 98.1 males.

The 2016–2020 5-year American Community Survey estimates show that the median household income was $54,881 (with a margin of error of +/- $10,884) and the median family income was $61,563 (+/- $14,610). Males had a median income of $37,614 (+/- $6,197) versus $27,109 (+/- $5,735) for females. The median income for those above 16 years old was $32,708 (+/- $4,870). Approximately, 6.7% of families and 5.6% of the population were below the poverty line, including 3.6% of those under the age of 18 and 5.5% of those ages 65 or over.

=== 2010 census ===
As of the census of 2010, there were 637 people, 232 households, and 175 families residing in the city. The population density was 1,447.7 inhabitants per square mile (559.0/km^{2}). There were 261 housing units at an average density of 593.2 per square mile (229.0/km^{2}). The racial makeup of the city was 97.8% White, 0.5% Native American, 0.2% from other races, and 1.6% from two or more races. Hispanic or Latino of any race were 2.2% of the population.

There were 232 households, of which 37.1% had children under the age of 18 living with them, 63.4% were married couples living together, 7.3% had a female householder with no husband present, 4.7% had a male householder with no wife present, and 24.6% were non-families. 22.0% of all households were made up of individuals, and 13.3% had someone living alone who was 65 years of age or older. The average household size was 2.61 and the average family size was 3.05.

The median age in the city was 40.2 years. 27.2% of residents were under the age of 18; 5.7% were between the ages of 18 and 24; 23.1% were from 25 to 44; 22.5% were from 45 to 64; and 21.4% were 65 years of age or older. The gender makeup of the city was 49.0% male and 51.0% female.

=== 2000 census ===
As of the census of 2000, there were 620 people, 233 households, and 154 families residing in the city. The population density was 1,443.6 inhabitants per square mile (557.4/km^{2}). There were 255 housing units at an average density of 593.8 per square mile (229.3/km^{2}). The racial makeup of the city was 97.10% White, 0.32% African American, 0.65% Native American, 0.48% from other races, and 1.45% from two or more races. Hispanic or Latino of any race were 1.29% of the population.

There were 233 households, out of which 32.6% had children under the age of 18 living with them, 57.9% were married couples living together, 7.3% had a female householder with no husband present, and 33.5% were non-families. 30.0% of all households were made up of individuals, and 21.5% had someone living alone who was 65 years of age or older. The average household size was 2.46 and the average family size was 3.10.

In the city, the population was spread out, with 26.0% under the age of 18, 6.9% from 18 to 24, 24.4% from 25 to 44, 16.5% from 45 to 64, and 26.3% who were 65 years of age or older. The median age was 40 years. For every 100 females, there were 87.9 males. For every 100 females age 18 and over, there were 80.7 males.

The median income for a household in the city was $38,281, and the median income for a family was $40,781. Males had a median income of $32,250 versus $18,500 for females. The per capita income for the city was $15,523. About 6.1% of families and 9.1% of the population were below the poverty line, including 13.4% of those under age 18 and 6.5% of those age 65 or over.

== Education ==
The community is served by Jefferson County North USD 339 public school district. School unification consolidated Nortonville and Winchester schools forming USD 339. The Jefferson County North High School mascot is Jefferson County Chargers. Jefferson County North Elementary and Middle School is located in Nortonville.

Nortonville High School was closed through school unification. The Nortonville High School mascot was Cardinals.

== See also ==
- List of sundown towns in the United States
