= Winchester, Kansas =

- City
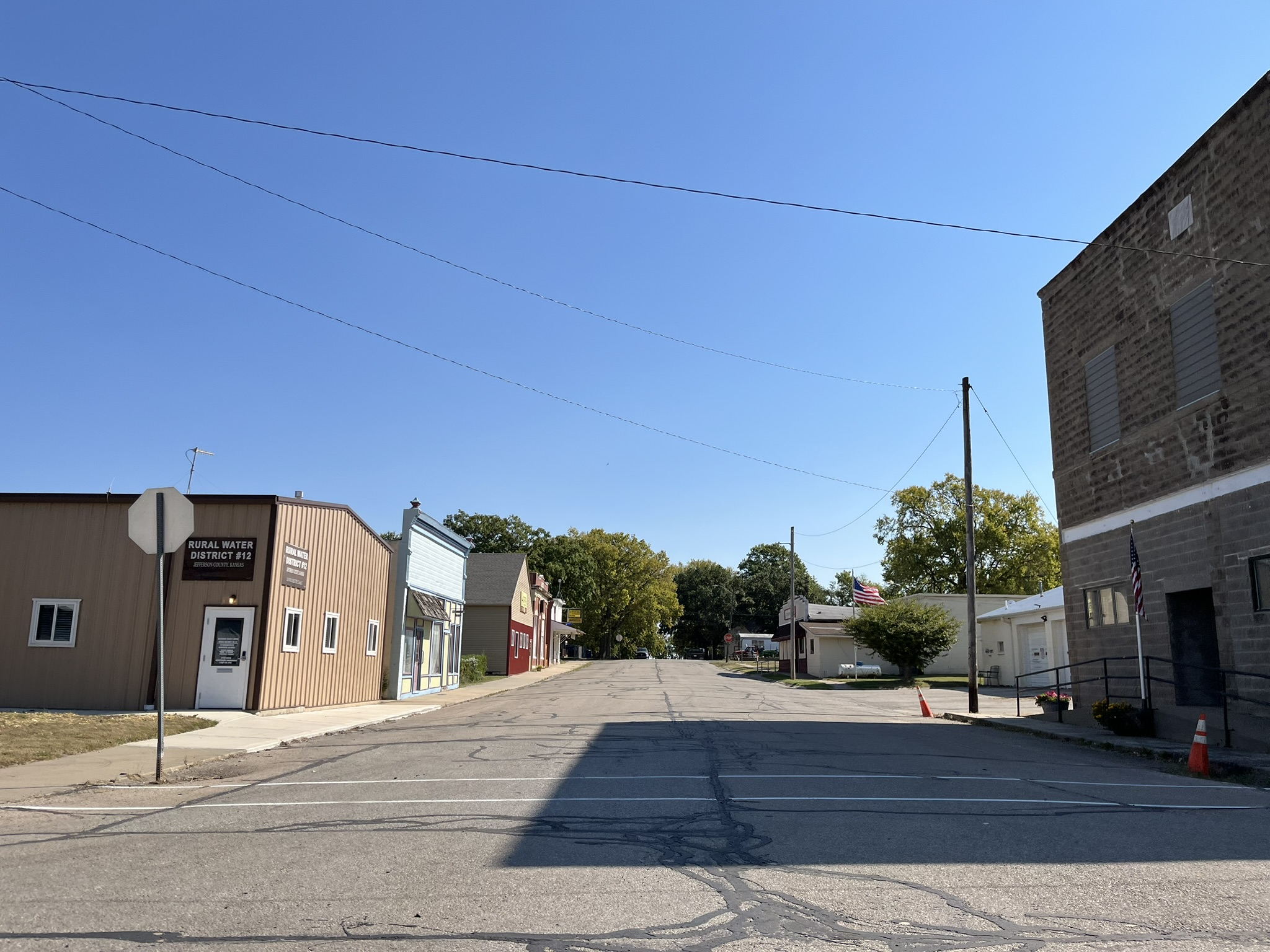
- Winchester Street (2024)

- Location within Jefferson County and Kansas

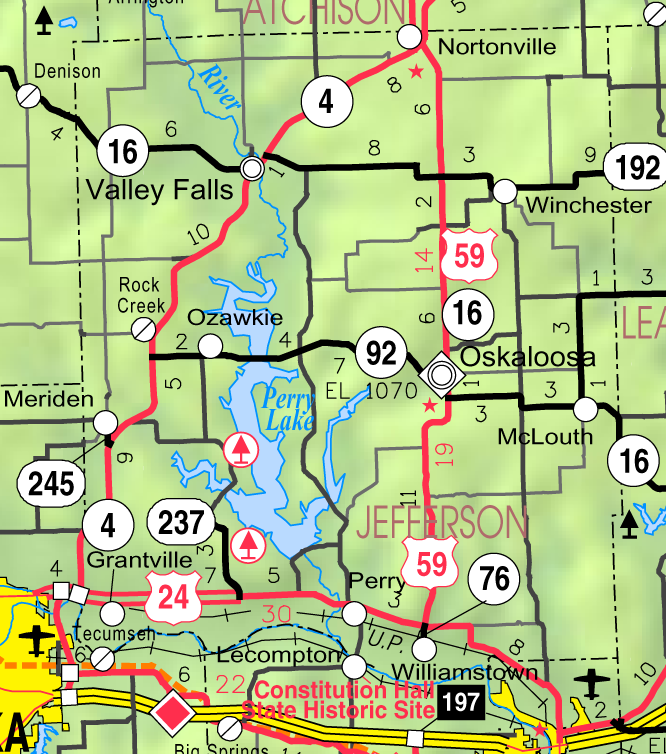
- KDOT map of Jefferson County (legend)
- Coordinates: 39°19′18″N 95°16′5″W
- Country: United States
- State: Kansas
- County: Jefferson
- Platted: 1857
- Incorporated: 1903
- Named for: Winchester, Virginia

Area
  - Total: 0.36 sq mi (0.93 km^{2})
  - Land: 0.35 sq mi (0.90 km^{2})
  - Water: 0.012 sq mi (0.03 km^{2})
- Elevation: 1,171 ft (357 m)

Population (2020)
  - Total: 461
  - Density: 1,300/sq mi (510/km^{2})
- Time zone: UTC-6 (CST)
  - Summer (DST): UTC-5 (CDT)
- ZIP Code: 66097
- Area code: 913
- FIPS code: 20-79800
- GNIS ID: 478344

Winchester is a city in Jefferson County, Kansas, United States. As of the 2020 census, the population of the city was 461.

== History ==
Winchester was laid out in 1857. It was named after Winchester, Virginia.

A post office in Winchester was established in March 1858 and closed in 2021.

The county hospital in Winchester was established in February 1956.

== Geography ==
Winchester is located at 39°19′18″N 95°16′5″W (39.321658, -95.268142). According to the United States Census Bureau, the city has a total area of 0.36 square miles (0.93 km^{2}), of which 0.35 square miles (0.91 km^{2}) is land and 0.01 square miles (0.03 km^{2}) is water.

== Demographics ==
Historical population
Census	Pop.	Note	%±
1880	413		—
1890	429		3.9%
1910	456		—
1920	386		−15.4%
1930	418		8.3%
1940	415		−0.7%
1950	355		−14.5%
1960	458		29.0%
1970	492		7.4%
1980	570		15.9%
1990	613		7.5%
2000	579		−5.5%
2010	551		−4.8%
2020	461		−16.3%
U.S. Decennial Census

Winchester is part of the Topeka, Kansas Metropolitan Statistical Area.

=== 2010 census ===
As of the census of 2010, there were 551 people, 229 households, and 140 families living in the city. The population density was 1,574.3 inhabitants per square mile (607.8/km^{2}). There were 261 housing units at an average density of 745.7 per square mile (287.9/km^{2}). The racial makeup of the city was 98.4% White, 1.3% Native American, and 0.4% from two or more races. Hispanic or Latino of any race were 0.9% of the population.

There were 229 households, of which 27.9% had children under the age of 18 living with them, 40.6% were married couples living together, 12.2% had a female householder with no husband present, 8.3% had a male householder with no wife present, and 38.9% were non-families. 34.1% of all households were made up of individuals, and 20.1% had someone living alone who was 65 years of age or older. The average household size was 2.28 and the average family size was 2.91.

The median age in the city was 42.8 years. 22.3% of residents were under the age of 18; 7.8% were between the ages of 18 and 24; 21.7% were from 25 to 44; 22.4% were from 45 to 64; and 25.6% were 65 years of age or older. The gender makeup of the city was 48.5% male and 51.5% female.

=== 2000 census ===
As of the census of 2000, there were 579 people, 210 households, and 149 families living in the city. The population density was 1,958.6 inhabitants per square mile (756.2/km^{2}). There were 221 housing units at an average density of 747.6 per square mile (288.6/km^{2}). The racial makeup of the city was 97.06% White, 2.25% Native American, 0.17% Asian, 0.17% from other races, and 0.35% from two or more races. Hispanic or Latino of any race were 1.73% of the population.

There were 210 households, out of which 35.7% had children under the age of 18 living with them, 54.8% were married couples living together, 11.9% had a female householder with no husband present, and 28.6% were non-families. 25.2% of all households were made up of individuals, and 13.8% had someone living alone who was 65 years of age or older. The average household size was 2.56 and the average family size was 3.07.

In the city, the population was spread out, with 26.4% under the age of 18, 9.7% from 18 to 24, 23.8% from 25 to 44, 17.6% from 45 to 64, and 22.5% who were 65 years of age or older. The median age was 38 years. For every 100 females, there were 90.5 males. For every 100 females age 18 and over, there were 82.8 males.

The median income for a household in the city was $37,143, and the median income for a family was $41,500. Males had a median income of $35,313 versus $19,659 for females. The per capita income for the city was $14,568. About 9.0% of families and 10.3% of the population were below the poverty line, including 14.2% of those under age 18 and 8.9% of those age 65 or over.

== Education ==
=== Schools ===
The community is served by Jefferson County North USD 339 public school district. School unification consolidated Nortonville and Winchester schools forming USD 339. Jefferson County North High School is located in Winchester. The Jefferson County North High School mascot is Jefferson County Chargers.

Winchester High School was closed through school unification. The Winchester High School mascot was Winchester Eagles.

=== Libraries ===
- Winchester Public Library

== Notable people ==
- Bob Lyon - Kansas State Senator.
- Al Reynolds - college and professional football guard.
- Jerry Robertson - baseball pitcher on the original 1969 Montreal Expos; also pitched for the 1970 Detroit Tigers.
