= Medina, Kansas =

Unincorporated community in Jefferson County, Kansas, U.S.

Coordinates: 39°04′40″N 95°25′16″W

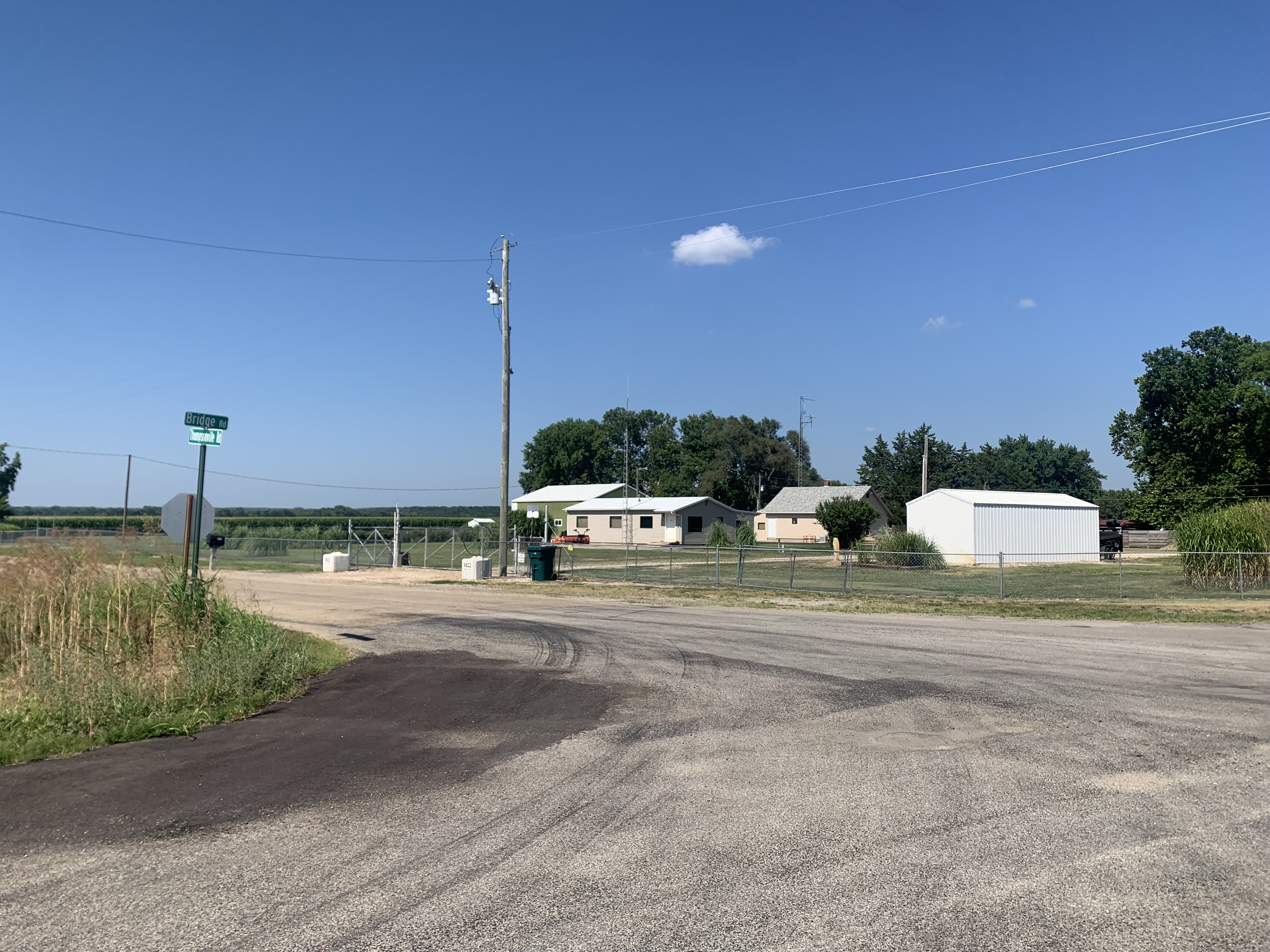
Medina at junction between Bridge and Thompsonville Road (2025)

Medina is an unincorporated community in Jefferson County, Kansas, United States.

== History ==
Medina had its start in the year 1865 by the building of the railroad through that territory.

A post office in Medina opened in 1866 and closed in 1901.
