= McLouth, Kansas =

- City
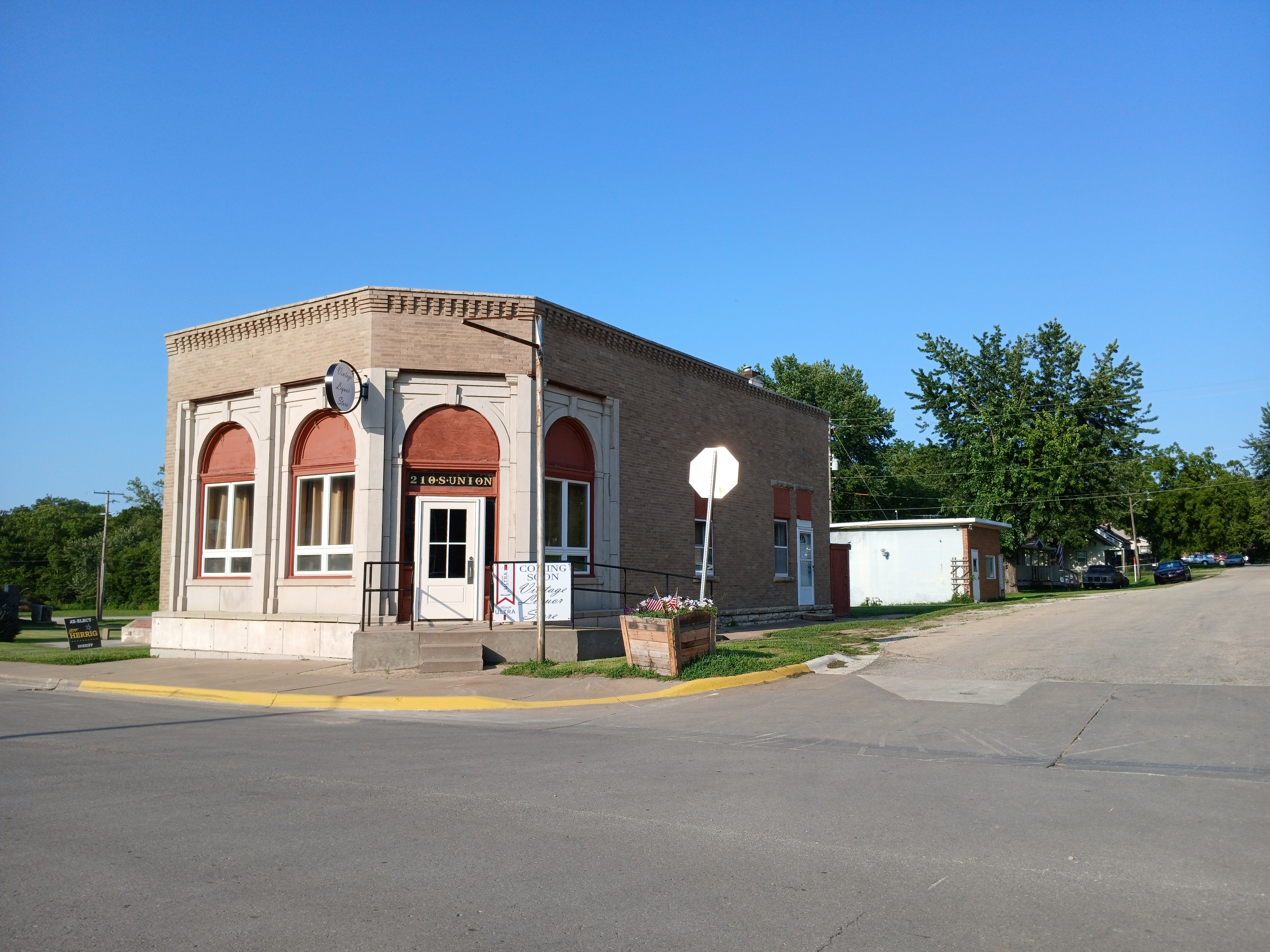
- Street corner in downtown McLouth, July 2024

- Location within Jefferson County and Kansas

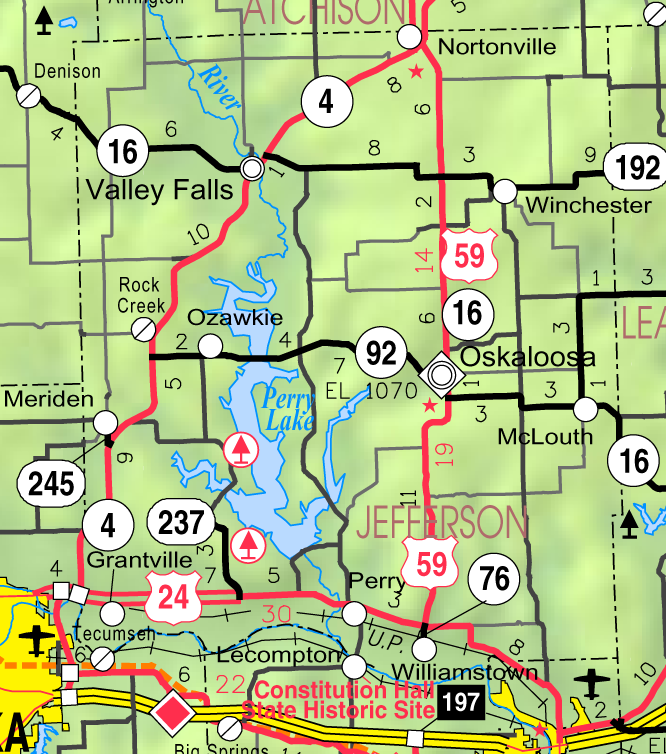
- KDOT map of Jefferson County (legend)
- Coordinates: 39°11′46″N 95°12′30″W
- Country: United States
- State: Kansas
- County: Jefferson
- Incorporated: 1881
- Named for: Amos McLouth

Area
  - Total: 0.58 sq mi (1.50 km^{2})
  - Land: 0.58 sq mi (1.49 km^{2})
  - Water: 0.0039 sq mi (0.01 km^{2})
- Elevation: 1,168 ft (356 m)

Population (2020)
  - Total: 859
  - Density: 1,490/sq mi (577/km^{2})
- Time zone: UTC-6 (CST)
  - Summer (DST): UTC-5 (CDT)
- ZIP Code: 66054
- Area code: 913
- GNIS ID: 2395075
- Website: cityofmclouth.org

McLouth is a city in Jefferson County, Kansas, United States. As of the 2020 census, the population of the city was 859.

== History ==
McLouth was founded in the 1880s. It was named for Amos McLouth, the original owner of the town site.

The first post office in McLouth was established in May 1882.

Since 1957, McLouth has been the site of the Threshing Bee and Fall Festival, a celebration of antique farm machinery.

== Geography ==
According to the United States Census Bureau, the city has a total area of 0.60 square miles (1.55 km^{2}), of which 0.59 square miles (1.53 km^{2}) is land and 0.01 square miles (0.03 km^{2}) is water.

== Demographics ==
Historical population
| Census | Pop. | Note | %± |
|---|---|---|---|
| 1890 | 311 | | — |
| 1900 | 529 | | 70.1% |
| 1910 | 571 | | 7.9% |
| 1920 | 575 | | 0.7% |
| 1930 | 517 | | −10.1% |
| 1940 | 515 | | −0.4% |
| 1950 | 477 | | −7.4% |
| 1960 | 402 | | −15.7% |
| 1970 | 472 | | 17.4% |
| 1980 | 700 | | 48.3% |
| 1990 | 719 | | 2.7% |
| 2000 | 868 | | 20.7% |
| 2010 | 880 | | 1.4% |
| 2020 | 859 | | −2.4% |
U.S. Decennial Census

McLouth is part of the Topeka, Kansas Metropolitan Statistical Area.

=== 2020 census ===
The 2020 United States census counted 859 people, 346 households, and 232 families in McLouth. The population density was 1,491.3 per square mile (575.8/km^{2}). There were 374 housing units at an average density of 649.3 per square mile (250.7/km^{2}). The racial makeup was 91.97% (790) white or European American (89.76% non-Hispanic white), 0.35% (3) black or African-American, 0.35% (3) Native American or Alaska Native, 0.12% (1) Asian, 0.12% (1) Pacific Islander or Native Hawaiian, 0.35% (3) from other races, and 6.75% (58) from two or more races. Hispanic or Latino of any race was 3.49% (30) of the population.

Of the 346 households, 34.1% had children under the age of 18; 49.7% were married couples living together; 24.6% had a female householder with no spouse or partner present. 26.9% of households consisted of individuals and 13.3% had someone living alone who was 65 years of age or older. The average household size was 2.8 and the average family size was 3.3. The percent of those with a bachelor's degree or higher was estimated to be 15.6% of the population.

27.2% of the population was under the age of 18, 7.3% from 18 to 24, 26.9% from 25 to 44, 24.7% from 45 to 64, and 13.9% who were 65 years of age or older. The median age was 35.2 years. For every 100 females, there were 98.4 males. For every 100 females ages 18 and older, there were 102.9 males.

The 2016–2020 5-year American Community Survey estimates show that the median household income was $50,776 (with a margin of error of +/- $6,476) and the median family income was $54,917 (+/- $13,357). Males had a median income of $34,583 (+/- $8,727) versus $23,516 (+/- $7,400) for females. The median income for those above 16 years old was $32,177 (+/- $4,962). Approximately, 10.5% of families and 14.7% of the population were below the poverty line, including 15.9% of those under the age of 18 and 6.8% of those ages 65 or over.

=== 2010 census ===
As of the census of 2010, there were 880 people, 341 households, and 240 families living in the city. The population density was 1,491.5 inhabitants per square mile (575.9/km^{2}). There were 384 housing units at an average density of 650.8 per square mile (251.3/km^{2}). The racial makeup of the city was 95.6% White, 0.8% African American, 0.6% Native American, 0.3% Asian, 0.8% from other races, and 1.9% from two or more races. Hispanic or Latino of any race were 1.1% of the population.

There were 341 households, of which 40.5% had children under the age of 18 living with them, 51.6% were married couples living together, 12.9% had a female householder with no husband present, 5.9% had a male householder with no wife present, and 29.6% were non-families. 25.8% of all households were made up of individuals, and 10.3% had someone living alone who was 65 years of age or older. The average household size was 2.58 and the average family size was 3.11.

The median age in the city was 32.2 years. 31.5% of residents were under the age of 18; 6.9% were between the ages of 18 and 24; 26.4% were from 25 to 44; 22.7% were from 45 to 64; and 12.4% were 65 years of age or older. The gender makeup of the city was 48.9% male and 51.1% female.

=== 2000 census ===
As of the census of 2000, there were 868 people, 326 households, and 246 families living in the city. The population density was 1,800.4 inhabitants per square mile (695.1/km^{2}). There were 350 housing units at an average density of 726.0 per square mile (280.3/km^{2}). The racial makeup of the city was 97.24% White, 0.23% African American, 0.92% Native American, 0.12% Asian, and 1.50% from two or more races. Hispanic or Latino of any race were 0.92% of the population.

There were 326 households, out of which 39.9% had children under the age of 18 living with them, 61.7% were married couples living together, 9.2% had a female householder with no husband present, and 24.5% were non-families. 20.2% of all households were made up of individuals, and 8.9% had someone living alone who was 65 years of age or older. The average household size was 2.66 and the average family size was 3.07.

In the city, the population was spread out, with 29.6% under the age of 18, 9.4% from 18 to 24, 32.4% from 25 to 44, 17.5% from 45 to 64, and 11.1% who were 65 years of age or older. The median age was 32 years. For every 100 females, there were 94.2 males. For every 100 females age 18 and over, there were 92.7 males.

The median income for a household in the city was $40,865, and the median income for a family was $44,063. Males had a median income of $36,100 versus $22,273 for females. The per capita income for the city was $17,012. About 4.7% of families and 7.1% of the population were below the poverty line, including 9.1% of those under age 18 and 16.7% of those age 65 or over.

== Education ==
The community is served by McLouth USD 342 public school district, which administers the elementary, middle and high schools on one campus. The buildings are attached and share some facilities. The district offers special education for 3 and 4 year olds, a 4year old at risk program, and kindergarten through 12th grade. McLouth High School offers dual credit courses with Kansas community colleges. In the 2014–2015 school year, there were 243 students in the elementary school, 115 students in the middle school and 171 students in the high school. The average dropout rate for 2008-2014 was 0.9%.
