= Grantville, Kansas =

- CDP
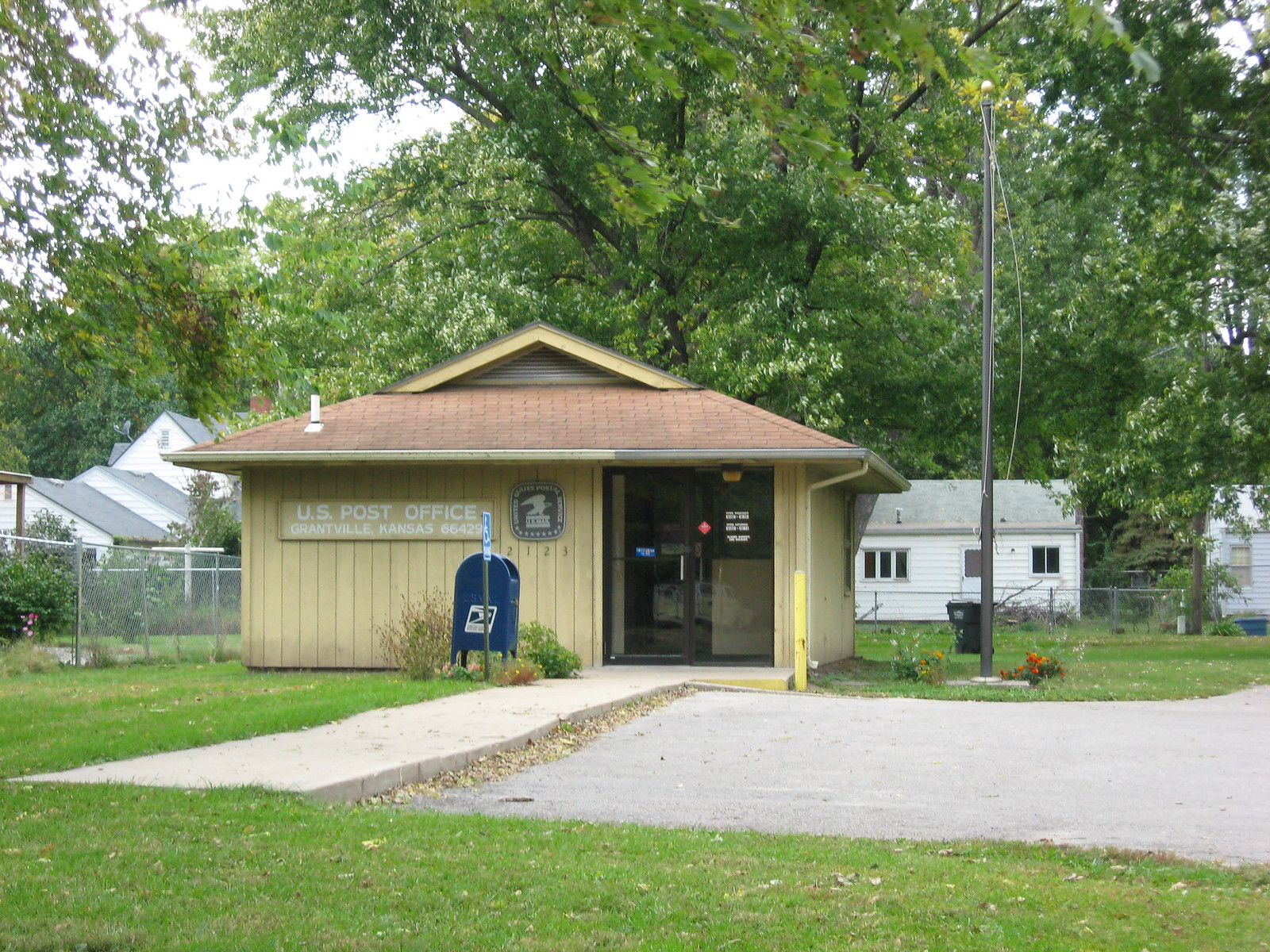
- Grantville Post Office (2008)

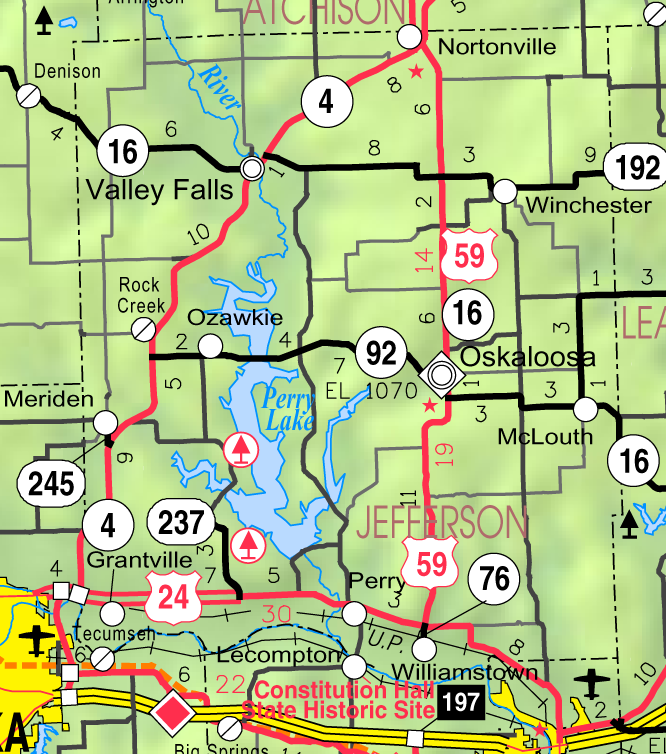
- KDOT map of Jefferson County (legend)

- Location within Kansas Location within the United States
- Coordinates: 39°5′0″N 95°33′41″W
- Country: United States
- State: Kansas
- County: Jefferson
- Township: Kaw

Area
  - Total: 1.95 sq mi (5.05 km^{2})
  - Land: 1.95 sq mi (5.05 km^{2})
  - Water: 0 sq mi (0.0 km^{2})
- Elevation: 873 ft (266 m)

Population (2020)
  - Total: 182
  - Density: 93.3/sq mi (36.0/km^{2})
- Time zone: UTC-6 (CST)
  - Summer (DST): UTC-5 (CDT)
- ZIP Code: 66429
- Area code: 785
- FIPS code: 20-28200
- GNIS ID: 478665

Grantville is a census-designated place (CDP) in Jefferson County, Kansas, United States. As of the 2020 census, the population was 182. It is located east of Topeka on the south side of US-24 between Barton and KOA / Wilson roads.

== History ==
Grantville was named in 1866 for Ulysses S. Grant, military commander in the Civil War and afterward 18th President of the United States.

The first post office in Grantville was established in October 1866.

== Geography ==
Grantville is located in southwestern Jefferson County at 39°05′00″N 95°33′41″W (39.083333, -95.561367), off U.S. Route 24. It is located in southwestern Kaw Township at an elevation of 876 feet (267 m), in the valley of the Kansas River. U.S. Route 24 runs along the northern edge of the community, leading east 9 miles (14 km) to Perry and west 5 miles (8 km) to the northern part of Topeka. Downtown Topeka is 9 miles (14 km) to the west and south of Grantville.

According to the U.S. Census Bureau, the Grantville CDP has an area of 1.95 square miles (5.05 km^{2}), all land.

=== Climate ===
The climate in this area is characterized by hot, humid summers and generally mild to cool winters. According to the Köppen Climate Classification system, Grantville has a humid subtropical climate, abbreviated "Cfa" on climate maps.

== Demographics ==
Historical population
Census	Pop.	Note	%±
2010	180		—
2020	182		1.1%
U.S. Decennial Census

The 2020 United States census counted 182 people, 71 households, and 47 families in Grantville. The population density was 296.9 per square mile (114.6/km^{2}). There were 72 housing units at an average density of 117.5 per square mile (45.3/km^{2}). The racial makeup was 87.36% (159) white or European American (82.97% non-Hispanic white), 0.0% (0) black or African-American, 3.85% (7) Native American or Alaska Native, 0.55% (1) Asian, 0.0% (0) Pacific Islander or Native Hawaiian, 3.85% (7) from other races, and 4.4% (8) from two or more races. Hispanic or Latino of any race was 8.79% (16) of the population.

Of the 71 households, 32.4% had children under the age of 18; 43.7% were married couples living together; 23.9% had a female householder with no spouse or partner present. 26.8% of households consisted of individuals and 14.1% had someone living alone who was 65 years of age or older. The average household size was 3.3 and the average family size was 3.8. The percent of those with a bachelor's degree or higher was estimated to be 18.7% of the population.

23.1% of the population was under the age of 18, 9.9% from 18 to 24, 24.7% from 25 to 44, 17.0% from 45 to 64, and 25.3% who were 65 years of age or older. The median age was 34.3 years. For every 100 females, there were 89.6 males. For every 100 females ages 18 and older, there were 86.7 males.

The 2016–2020 5-year American Community Survey estimates show that the median household income was $71,417 (with a margin of error of +/- $1,835) and the median family income was $72,000 (+/- $11,742). Males had a median income of $42,361 (+/- $40,043).

== Economy ==
Grantville has a fire station, a gas station and a few other local business. It also has a post office with the ZIP Code of 66429.

== Education ==
The community is served by Perry–Lecompton USD 343 public school district. The elementary school in Grantville closed in 2009, and children are now bused to schools in Perry and Lecompton. The old Grantville Elementary had been torn down.

== Notable people ==
- Josh Billings, baseball player and manager
