= Sarcoxie Township, Kansas =

Sarcoxie Township
- Township
- Location in Jefferson County
- Coordinates: 39°05′45″N 95°14′01″W
- Country: United States
- State: Kansas
- County: Jefferson

Area
  - Total: 31.03 sq mi (80.36 km^{2})
  - Land: 31 sq mi (80 km^{2})
  - Water: 0.14 sq mi (0.36 km^{2}) 0.45%
- Elevation: 1,014 ft (309 m)

Population (2020)
  - Total: 986
  - Density: 32/sq mi (12/km^{2})
- GNIS feature ID: 0478519

Sarcoxie Township is a township in Jefferson County, Kansas, United States. As of the 2020 census, its population was 986.

== Geography ==
Sarcoxie Township covers an area of 31.03 square miles (80.36 square kilometers); of this, 0.14 square miles (0.36 square kilometers) or 0.45 percent is water. The stream of Plum Creek runs through this township.

=== Adjacent townships ===
- Union Township (north)
- Tonganoxie Township, Leavenworth County (northeast)
- Reno Township, Leavenworth County (southeast)
- Grant Township, Douglas County (south)
- Rural Township (west)
- Oskaloosa Township (northwest)

=== Cemeteries ===
The township contains one cemetery, Hardy Oak.

=== Major highways ===
- U.S. Route 24/U.S. Route 59
