= Half Mound, Kansas =

Unincorporated community in Kansas, U.S.

Coordinates: 39°24′21″N 95°29′51″W

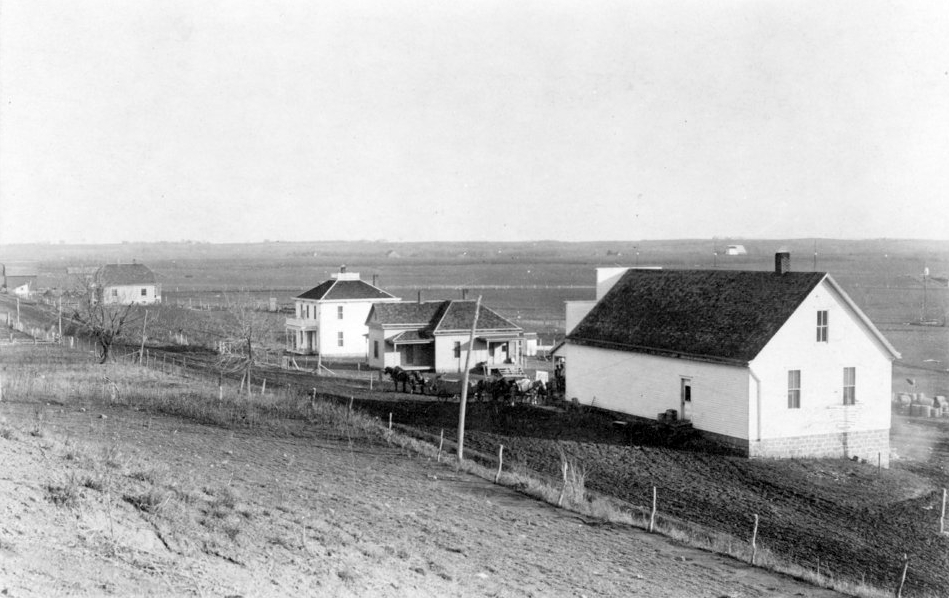
Half Mound between 1900 and 1919

Half Mound is an unincorporated community in Jefferson County, Kansas, United States.

== History ==
A post office was opened in Half Mound (spelled historically Halfmound) in 1898, and remained in operation until it was discontinued in 1914.
