= Buck Creek, Kansas =

Unincorporated community in Kansas, U.S.

Coordinates: 39°03′00″N 95°16′56″W

Buck Creek is an unincorporated community in Jefferson County, Kansas, United States.

== History ==
A post office was opened in Buck Creek (also spelled historically as Buckcreek) in 1899, and remained in operation until it was discontinued in 1905.
