= Jefferson County, Kansas =

County in Kansas, United States

- County
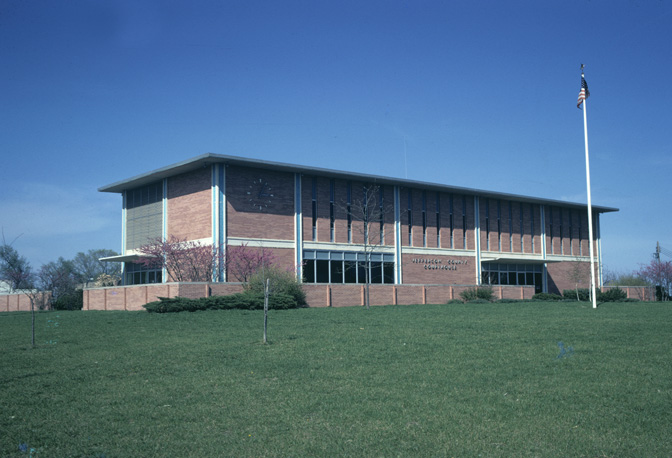
- Jefferson County Courthouse in Oskaloosa (1971)

- Location within the U.S. state of Kansas
- Country: United States
- State: Kansas
- Founded: August 25, 1855
- Named for: Thomas Jefferson
- Seat: Oskaloosa
- Largest city: Oskaloosa

Area
  - Total: 557 sq mi (1,440 km^{2})
  - Land: 533 sq mi (1,380 km^{2})
  - Water: 24 sq mi (62 km^{2}) 4.3%

Population (2020)
  - Total: 18,368
  - Estimate (2025): 18,296 ▼
  - Density: 34.5/sq mi (13.3/km^{2})
- Time zone: UTC−6 (Central)
  - Summer (DST): UTC−5 (CDT)
- Congressional district: 1st
- Website: jfcountyks.com

Jefferson County is a county located in the U.S. state of Kansas. Its county seat and most populous city is Oskaloosa. As of the 2020 census, the county population was 18,368. The county was named after Thomas Jefferson, the 3rd president of the United States.

== History ==
=== Early history ===
For many millennia, the Great Plains of North America was inhabited by nomadic Native Americans. From the 16th century to 18th century, the Kingdom of France claimed ownership of large parts of North America. In 1762, after the French and Indian War, France secretly ceded New France to Spain, per the Treaty of Fontainebleau.

=== 19th century ===
In 1802, Spain returned most of the land to France, but keeping title to about 7,500 square miles. In 1803, most of the land for modern day Kansas was acquired by the United States from France as part of the 828,000 square mile Louisiana Purchase for 2.83 cents per acre.

In 1854, the Kansas Territory was organized, then in 1861 Kansas became the 34th U.S. state. In 1855, Jefferson County was established, and was named for President Thomas Jefferson. Settlement of the county was slowed by events prior to and during the Civil War, but the present day unincorporated community of Thompsonville (3 miles northwest of Perry on the Delaware River) was the first established in 1851 by Mormon settlers who initially refused to accompany the main group led by Brigham Young to the Salt Lake Valley. The settlement was first abandoned due to the violence resulting from the border wars, but was re-established when the Civil War ended.

== Geography ==
According to the U.S. Census Bureau, the county has a total area of 557 square miles (1,440 km^{2}), of which 533 square miles (1,380 km^{2}) is land and 2.4 square miles (6.2 km^{2}) (4.3%) is water.

=== Adjacent counties ===
- Atchison County (north)
- Leavenworth County (east)
- Douglas County (south)
- Shawnee County (southwest)
- Jackson County (northwest)

== Demographics ==
Historical population
Census	Pop.	Note	%±
1860	4,459		—
1870	12,526		180.9%
1880	15,563		24.2%
1890	16,620		6.8%
1900	17,533		5.5%
1910	15,826		−9.7%
1920	14,750		−6.8%
1930	14,129		−4.2%
1940	12,718		−10.0%
1950	11,084		−12.8%
1960	11,252		1.5%
1970	11,945		6.2%
1980	15,207		27.3%
1990	15,905		4.6%
2000	18,426		15.9%
2010	19,126		3.8%
2020	18,368		−4.0%
2025 (est.)	18,296	▼	−0.4%
U.S. Decennial Census; 1790-1960 1900-1990; 1990-2000 2010-2020

Jefferson County is included in the Topeka, Kansas metropolitan area.

=== Racial and ethnic composition ===
Jefferson County, Kansas – Racial and ethnic composition Note: the US Census treats Hispanic/Latino as an ethnic category. This table excludes Latinos from the racial categories and assigns them to a separate category. Hispanics/Latinos may be of any race.
Race / Ethnicity (NH = Non-Hispanic)	Pop 1980	Pop 1990	Pop 2000	Pop 2010	Pop 2020	% 1980	% 1990	% 2000	% 2010	% 2020
White alone (NH)	14,937	15,510	17,683	18,170	16,549	98.22%	97.52%	95.97%	95.00%	90.10%
Black or African American alone (NH)	51	73	65	100	99	0.34%	0.46%	0.35%	0.52%	0.54%
Native American or Alaska Native alone (NH)	110	124	170	166	124	0.72%	0.78%	0.92%	0.87%	0.68%
Asian alone (NH)	21	62	30	38	41	0.14%	0.39%	0.16%	0.20%	0.22%
Native Hawaiian or Pacific Islander alone (NH)	x	x	2	6	27	x	x	0.01%	0.03%	0.15%
Other race alone (NH)	8	4	5	15	29	0.05%	0.03%	0.03%	0.08%	0.16%
Mixed race or Multiracial (NH)	x	x	235	292	932	x	x	1.28%	1.53%	5.07%
Hispanic or Latino (any race)	80	132	236	339	567	0.53%	0.83%	1.28%	1.77%	3.09%
Total	15,207	15,905	18,426	19,126	18,368	100.00%	100.00%	100.00%	100.00%	100.00%

=== 2020 census ===
As of the 2020 census, the county had a population of 18,368, a median age of 43.7 years, 23.4% of residents under the age of 18, and 19.8% of residents 65 years of age or older.

For every 100 females there were 102.2 males and for every 100 females age 18 and over there were 101.2 males age 18 and over. 0.9% of residents lived in urban areas, while 99.1% lived in rural areas.

The racial makeup of the county was 91.4% White, 0.6% Black or African American, 0.7% American Indian and Alaska Native, 0.2% Asian, 0.2% Native Hawaiian and Pacific Islander, 0.7% from some other race, and 6.2% from two or more races. Hispanic or Latino residents of any race comprised 3.1% of the population.

There were 7,209 households in the county, of which 30.0% had children under the age of 18 living with them and 18.3% had a female householder with no spouse or partner present. About 23.3% of all households were made up of individuals and 11.4% had someone living alone who was 65 years of age or older.

There were 7,911 housing units, of which 8.9% were vacant. Among occupied housing units, 83.1% were owner-occupied and 16.9% were renter-occupied. The homeowner vacancy rate was 1.1% and the rental vacancy rate was 6.4%.

=== 2000 census ===
As of the 2000 census, there were 18,426 people, 6,830 households and 5,190 families residing in the county. The population density was 34 inhabitants per square mile (13/km^{2}). There were 7,491 housing units at an average density of 14 per square mile (5.4/km^{2}). The racial makeup of the county was 96.70% White, 0.92% Native American, 0.37% Black or African American, 0.17% Asian, 0.01% Pacific Islander, 0.42% from other races, and 1.41% from two or more races. Hispanic or Latino of any race were 1.28% of the population.

There were 6,830 households, of which 35.70% had children under the age of 18 living with them, 65.20% were married couples living together, 7.00% had a female householder with no husband present, and 24.00% were non-families. 20.10% of all households were made up of individuals, and 9.30% had someone living alone who was 65 years of age or older. The average household size was 2.66 and the average family size was 3.07.

27.40% of the population were under the age of 18, 7.00% from 18 to 24, 28.00% from 25 to 44, 24.90% from 45 to 64, and 12.80% who were 65 years of age or older. The median age was 38 years. For every 100 females, there were 102.60 males. For every 100 females age 18 and over, there were 98.90 males.

The median household income was $45,535 and the median family income was $50,557. Males had a median income of $36,174 compared with $25,468 for females. The per capita income for the county was $19,373. About 5.30% of families and 6.70% of the population were below the poverty line, including 6.90% of those under age 18 and 7.70% of those age 65 or over.

== Government ==
=== Presidential elections ===
Presidential election results

United States presidential election results for Jefferson County, Kansas
Year	Republican		Democratic		Third party(ies)	
Year	No.	%	No.	%	No.	%
1888	2,268	57.00%	1,601	40.24%	110	2.76%
1892	2,026	49.95%	0	0.00%	2,030	50.05%
1896	2,322	49.99%	2,276	49.00%	47	1.01%
1900	2,374	54.66%	1,912	44.02%	57	1.31%
1904	2,568	65.26%	1,199	30.47%	168	4.27%
1908	2,270	55.57%	1,720	42.11%	95	2.33%
1912	1,155	29.75%	1,537	39.59%	1,190	30.65%
1916	3,174	50.49%	2,919	46.44%	193	3.07%
1920	3,463	68.86%	1,535	30.52%	31	0.62%
1924	4,422	72.71%	1,320	21.70%	340	5.59%
1928	4,810	74.77%	1,601	24.89%	22	0.34%
1932	2,974	47.42%	3,185	50.79%	112	1.79%
1936	3,711	54.25%	3,105	45.39%	25	0.37%
1940	4,330	65.81%	2,212	33.62%	38	0.58%
1944	3,504	68.73%	1,575	30.89%	19	0.37%
1948	2,986	59.04%	2,010	39.74%	62	1.23%
1952	3,980	73.47%	1,411	26.05%	26	0.48%
1956	3,677	70.24%	1,536	29.34%	22	0.42%
1960	3,353	65.73%	1,739	34.09%	9	0.18%
1964	2,380	53.07%	2,066	46.06%	39	0.87%
1968	2,781	56.58%	1,355	27.57%	779	15.85%
1972	3,679	72.69%	1,237	24.44%	145	2.87%
1976	3,225	55.12%	2,470	42.22%	156	2.67%
1980	4,046	64.60%	1,776	28.36%	441	7.04%
1984	4,524	68.93%	1,990	30.32%	49	0.75%
1988	3,605	55.53%	2,810	43.28%	77	1.19%
1992	2,569	33.02%	2,538	32.62%	2,673	34.36%
1996	3,781	49.31%	2,757	35.95%	1,130	14.74%
2000	4,423	56.15%	3,000	38.09%	454	5.76%
2004	5,408	61.50%	3,253	37.00%	132	1.50%
2008	5,220	58.32%	3,542	39.58%	188	2.10%
2012	4,827	60.24%	2,977	37.15%	209	2.61%
2016	5,213	62.53%	2,518	30.20%	606	7.27%
2020	6,334	64.75%	3,194	32.65%	254	2.60%
2024	6,694	67.43%	3,030	30.52%	203	2.04%

Like all of Kansas outside the eastern cities, Jefferson County is a Republican stronghold, having not been won by a Democrat since Franklin D. Roosevelt’s 1932 landslide – although it was one of three Kansas counties to give a plurality to Ross Perot in 1992.

=== Laws ===
Jefferson County was a prohibition, or "dry", county until the Kansas Constitution was amended in 1986 and voters approved the sale of alcoholic liquor by the individual drink with a 30% food sales requirement.

The county voted "No" on the 2022 Kansas abortion referendum, an anti-abortion ballot measure, by 55% to 45% despite backing Donald Trump with 65% of the vote to Joe Biden's 33% in the 2020 presidential election.

== Media ==
Jefferson County has two newspapers which are still in operation, The Oskaloosa Independent and The Valley Falls Vindicator. Both of which are owned by Davis Publications. Together, the two papers cover the happenings of Jefferson County and its townships. The editor for both papers is Holly Allen.

== Education ==
=== Unified school districts ===
School districts include:

- Atchison County USD 377
- Easton USD 449
- Holton USD 336
- Jefferson County North USD 339
- Jefferson West USD 340
- Lawrence USD 497
- McLouth USD 342
- Oskaloosa USD 341
- Perry-Lecompton USD 343
- Seaman USD 345
- Valley Falls USD 338

== Communities ==
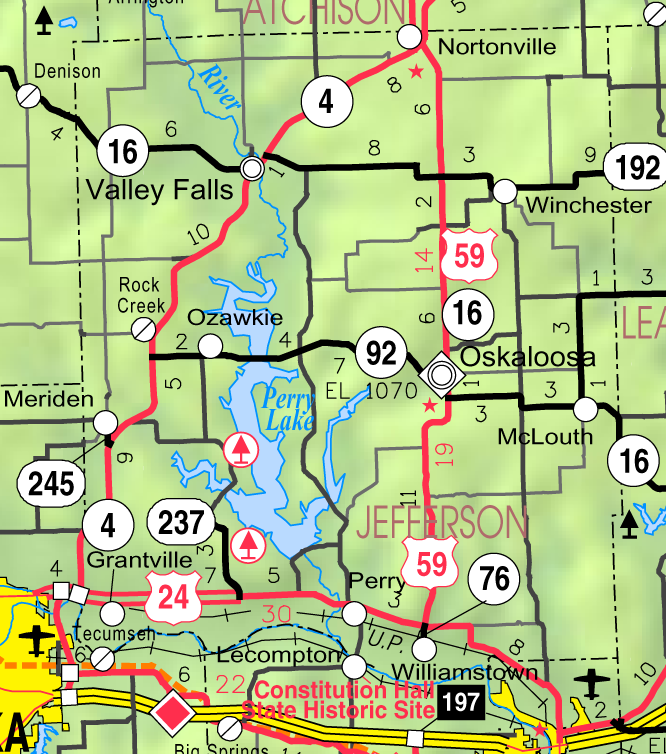
2005 map of Jefferson County (map legend)

List of townships / incorporated cities / unincorporated communities / extinct former communities within Jefferson County.

=== Cities ===
- McLouth
- Meriden
- Nortonville
- Oskaloosa (county seat)
- Ozawkie
- Perry
- Valley Falls
- Winchester

=== Unincorporated communities ===
† means a community is designated a Census-Designated Place (CDP) by the United States Census Bureau.

- Boyle
- Buck Creek
- Dunavant
- Grantville†
- Half Mound
- Lakeside Village
- Medina
- Mooney Creek
- Newman
- Rock Creek
- Thompsonville
- Williamstown†

=== Townships ===
Jefferson County is divided into twelve townships. None of the cities within the county are considered governmentally independent, and all figures for the townships include those of the cities. In the following table, the population center is the largest city (or cities) included in that township's population total, if it is of a significant size.

Township	FIPS	Population center	Population	Population density /km^{2} (/sq mi)	Land area km^{2} (sq mi)	Water area km^{2} (sq mi)	Water %	Geographic coordinates
Delaware	17425	Valley Falls	2,034	9 (23)	229 (88)	0 (0)	0.11%	39°21′6″N 95°28′31″W
Fairview	22525	Rural Ozawkie	1,510	22 (56)	70 (27)	20 (8)	22.20%	39°10′49″N 95°26′50″W
Jefferson	35250	Winchester	1,240	8 (21)	151 (58)	0 (0)	0.24%	39°19′37″N 95°16′11″W
Kaw	36125	Grantville	1,409	16 (43)	86 (33)	2 (1)	1.78%	39°5′41″N 95°32′55″W
Kentucky	36575	Perry	1,576	17 (44)	93 (36)	14 (5)	13.18%	39°5′18″N 95°24′42″W
Norton	51475	Nortonville	955	9 (25)	101 (39)	0 (0)	0.30%	39°24′13″N 95°18′47″W
Oskaloosa	53400	Oskaloosa	2,142	14 (37)	149 (58)	0 (0)	0.17%	39°13′12″N 95°18′58″W
Ozawkie	53950	Ozawkie	1,408	15 (38)	97 (37)	14 (5)	12.74%	39°14′32″N 95°26′3″W
Rock Creek	60575	Meriden	2,718	19 (50)	140 (54)	1 (1)	0.92%	39°12′52″N 95°32′58″W
Rural	61700	Williamstown	804	10 (25)	82 (32)	1 (0)	1.14%	39°4′31″N 95°18′52″W
Sarcoxie	63100	Rural Lawrence	958	12 (31)	80 (31)	0 (0)	0.45%	39°5′13″N 95°14′50″W
Union	72150	McLouth	1,672	15 (39)	111 (43)	0 (0)	0.30%	39°12′41″N 95°12′26″W
Sources: "Census 2000 U.S. Gazetteer Files". U.S. Census Bureau, Geography Division. Archived from the original on August 2, 2002.

== Notable people ==
- Roger Barker (1903–1990), American environmental psychologist
- John Curry (1897–1946), painter
- Mary Lowman (1842–1912), first woman in Kansas to be elected mayor with a city council composed entirely of women.
- Charles Roberts (1936-), American politician

== See also ==
Community information for Kansas

- Kansas locations by per capita income
- List of counties in Kansas
- List of townships in Kansas
- List of cities in Kansas
- List of unincorporated communities in Kansas
- List of ghost towns in Kansas
