= Kaw Township, Jefferson County, Kansas =

Coordinates: 39°06′10″N 95°32′51″W

Kaw Township
- Township
- Location in Jefferson County
- Country: United States
- State: Kansas
- County: Jefferson

Area
  - Total: 33.114 sq mi (85.76 km^{2})
  - Land: 32.222 sq mi (83.45 km^{2})
  - Water: 0.892 sq mi (2.31 km^{2})

Population (2020)
  - Total: 1,390
  - Density: 43.1/sq mi (16.7/km^{2})
- GNIS feature ID: 0478243

Kaw Township is a township in Jefferson County, Kansas, United States. Its population as of the 2020 census was 1,390.

== Communities ==
It contains the census-designated place of Grantville.
