= Perry, Kansas =

City of Perry, Kansas
- City
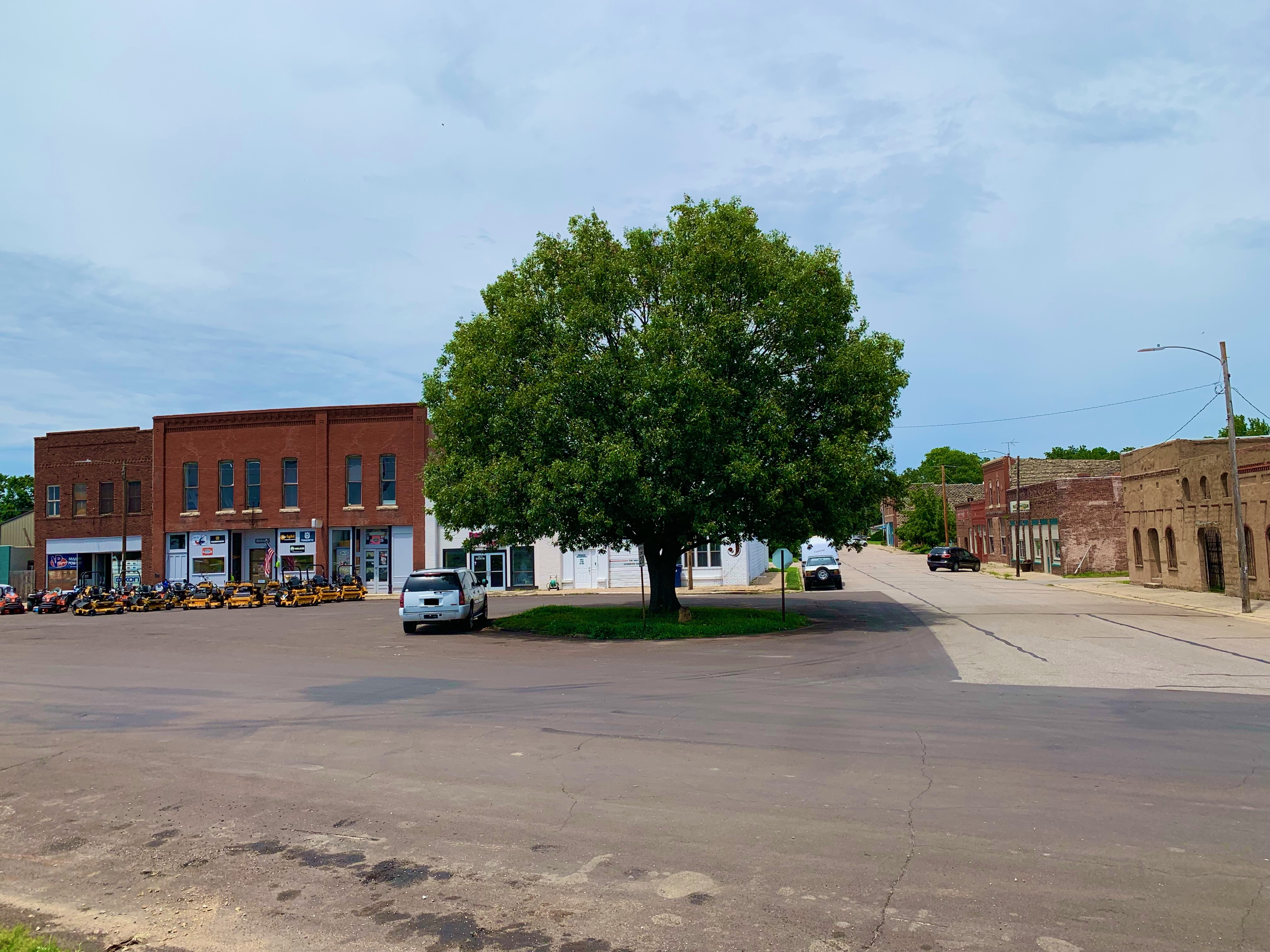
- Downtown Perry (2024)

- Location within Jefferson County and Kansas

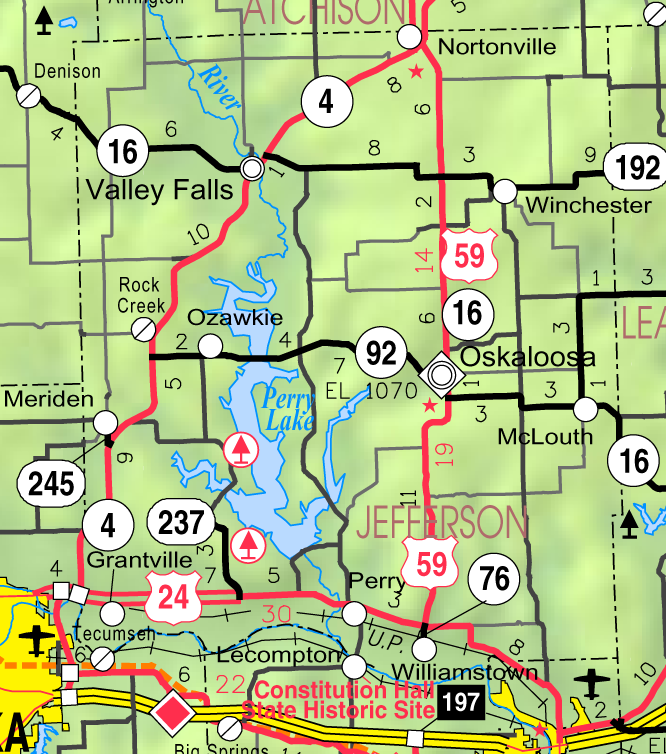
- KDOT map of Jefferson County (legend)
- Coordinates: 39°4′32″N 95°23′31″W
- Country: United States
- State: Kansas
- County: Jefferson
- Founded: 1865
- Incorporated: 1871
- Named for: John Perry

Area
  - Total: 0.76 sq mi (1.97 km^{2})
  - Land: 0.75 sq mi (1.94 km^{2})
  - Water: 0.012 sq mi (0.03 km^{2})
- Elevation: 853 ft (260 m)

Population (2020)
  - Total: 852
  - Density: 1,140/sq mi (439/km^{2})
- Time zone: UTC-6 (CST)
  - Summer (DST): UTC-5 (CDT)
- ZIP Code: 66073
- Area code: 785
- FIPS code: 20-55450
- GNIS ID: 478809
- Website: www.cityofperryks.com

Perry is a city in Jefferson County, Kansas, United States. As of the 2020 census, the population of the city was 852.

== History ==
Perry got its start in the year 1865 following construction of the railroad through the territory. It was named for John D. Perry, the President of the Kansas Pacific Railroad.

The first post office in Perry was established in October 1866.

== Geography ==
Perry is located at 39°4′32″N 95°23′31″W (39.075458, -95.391902). According to the United States Census Bureau, the city has a total area of 0.77 square miles (1.99 km^{2}), all land.

=== Climate ===
The climate in this area is characterized by hot, humid summers and generally mild to cool winters. According to the Köppen Climate Classification system, Perry has a humid subtropical climate, abbreviated "Cfa" on climate maps.

== Demographics ==
Historical population
Census	Pop.	Note	%±
1870	403		—
1880	319		−20.8%
1900	464		—
1910	400		−13.8%
1920	481		20.3%
1930	418		−13.1%
1940	392		−6.2%
1950	399		1.8%
1960	495		24.1%
1970	664		34.1%
1980	907		36.6%
1990	881		−2.9%
2000	901		2.3%
2010	929		3.1%
2020	852		−8.3%
U.S. Decennial Census

Perry is part of the Topeka, Kansas Metropolitan Statistical Area.

=== 2020 census ===
The 2020 United States census counted 852 people, 371 households, and 238 families in Perry. The population density was 1,137.5 per square mile (439.2/km^{2}). There were 385 housing units at an average density of 514.0 per square mile (198.5/km^{2}). The racial makeup was 90.14% (768) white or European American (88.97% non-Hispanic white), 1.06% (9) black or African-American, 0.59% (5) Native American or Alaska Native, 0.59% (5) Asian, 0.12% (1) Pacific Islander or Native Hawaiian, 1.17% (10) from other races, and 6.34% (54) from two or more races. Hispanic or Latino of any race was 3.64% (31) of the population.

Of the 371 households, 27.5% had children under the age of 18; 47.2% were married couples living together; 25.9% had a female householder with no spouse or partner present. 29.6% of households consisted of individuals and 14.8% had someone living alone who was 65 years of age or older. The average household size was 2.5 and the average family size was 3.0. The percent of those with a bachelor's degree or higher was estimated to be 13.6% of the population.

22.3% of the population was under the age of 18, 6.7% from 18 to 24, 22.5% from 25 to 44, 25.5% from 45 to 64, and 23.0% who were 65 years of age or older. The median age was 43.4 years. For every 100 females, there were 105.8 males. For every 100 females ages 18 and older, there were 107.5 males.

The 2016–2020 5-year American Community Survey estimates show that the median household income was $59,583 (with a margin of error of +/- $8,103) and the median family income was $70,893 (+/- $18,178). Males had a median income of $46,830 (+/- $11,194) versus $22,847 (+/- $6,048) for females. The median income for those above 16 years old was $35,664 (+/- $9,397). Approximately, 8.1% of families and 12.8% of the population were below the poverty line, including 19.2% of those under the age of 18 and 7.8% of those ages 65 or over.

=== 2010 census ===
As of the census of 2010, there were 929 people, 375 households, and 254 families living in the city. The population density was 1,206.5 inhabitants per square mile (465.8/km^{2}). There were 392 housing units at an average density of 509.1 per square mile (196.6/km^{2}). The racial makeup of the city was 95.7% White, 1.1% African American, 0.4% Native American, 0.3% Asian, 0.4% from other races, and 2.0% from two or more races. Hispanic or Latino of any race were 2.2% of the population.

There were 375 households, of which 36.0% had children under the age of 18 living with them, 50.4% were married couples living together, 11.5% had a female householder with no husband present, 5.9% had a male householder with no wife present, and 32.3% were non-families. 26.7% of all households were made up of individuals, and 13.6% had someone living alone who was 65 years of age or older. The average household size was 2.48 and the average family size was 2.92.

The median age in the city was 37.1 years. 27.1% of residents were under the age of 18; 6.4% were between the ages of 18 and 24; 25.6% were from 25 to 44; 25.3% were from 45 to 64; and 15.6% were 65 years of age or older. The gender makeup of the city was 47.6% male and 52.4% female.

=== 2000 census ===
As of the census of 2000, there were 901 people, 370 households, and 260 families living in the city. The population density was 1,156.5 inhabitants per square mile (446.5/km^{2}). There were 395 housing units at an average density of 507.0 per square mile (195.8/km^{2}). The racial makeup of the city was 94.12% White, 0.67% African American, 0.67% Native American, 0.33% Asian, 0.22% Pacific Islander, 0.33% from other races, and 3.66% from two or more races. Hispanic or Latino of any race were 1.00% of the population.

There were 370 households, out of which 33.5% had children under the age of 18 living with them, 55.4% were married couples living together, 11.9% had a female householder with no husband present, and 29.7% were non-families. 24.9% of all households were made up of individuals, and 14.1% had someone living alone who was 65 years of age or older. The average household size was 2.44 and the average family size was 2.91.

In the city, the population was spread out, with 25.7% under the age of 18, 9.3% from 18 to 24, 27.3% from 25 to 44, 21.8% from 45 to 64, and 15.9% who were 65 years of age or older. The median age was 37 years. For every 100 females, there were 94.6 males. For every 100 females age 18 and over, there were 89.0 males.

The median income for a household in the city was $39,013, and the median income for a family was $46,641. Males had a median income of $32,778 versus $26,500 for females. The per capita income for the city was $17,577. About 4.9% of families and 7.9% of the population were below the poverty line, including 6.0% of those under age 18 and 12.0% of those age 65 or over.

== Education ==
The community is served by Perry–Lecompton USD 343 public school district. School unification consolidated Perry and Lecompton schools forming USD 343 in 1970. Perry-Lecompton High School is located in Perry. Lecompton Elementary School is located in Lecompton. The Perry-Lecompton High School mascot is Kaws.

Prior to school unification, the Perry High School mascot was Kaws.

== Parks and Recreation ==
- Perry Lake and Perry State Park
- Great Flood of 1951
