= Lakeside Village, Kansas =

- Unincorporated community
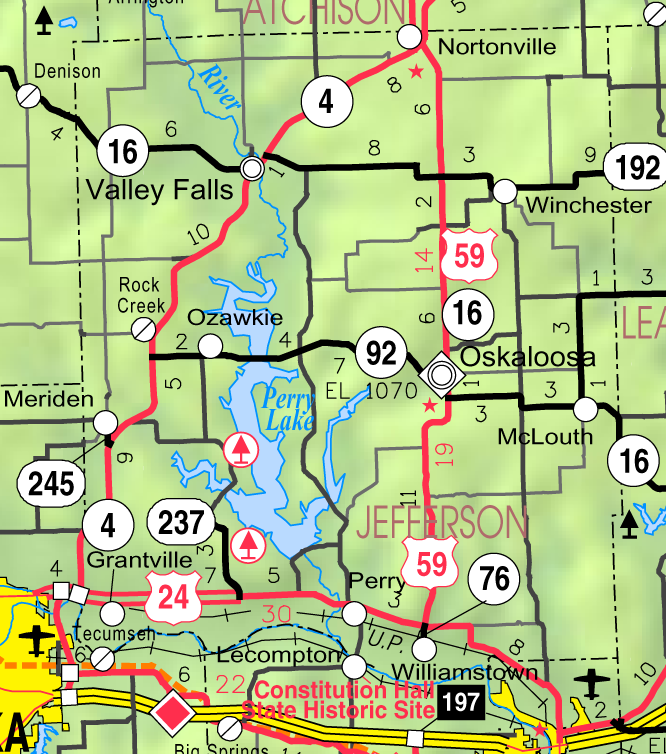
- KDOT map of Jefferson County (legend)

- Location within Kansas Location within the United States
- Coordinates: 39°10′31″N 95°25′17″W
- Country: United States
- State: Kansas
- County: Jefferson
- Elevation: 1,083 ft (330 m)
- Time zone: UTC-6 (CST)
  - Summer (DST): UTC-5 (CDT)
- Area code: 785
- FIPS code: 20-38065
- GNIS ID: 484910

Lakeside Village is an unincorporated community in central Jefferson County, Kansas, United States. It is located on the shore of Perry Lake.

The community has a "town hall" despite being unincorporated; it also has a community swimming pool. Lakeside Village uses Ozawkie as its mailing address, and Oskaloosa USD 341 serves area students.

== History ==
Properties in the community were first sold in the 1960s while Perry Lake was under construction. The lake was completed in 1970, and Jefferson County designated Lakeside Village as an improvement district in 1972.

== See also ==
- Perry State Park
