= Thompsonville, Kansas =

Unincorporated community in Kansas, U.S.

Coordinates: 39°06′20″N 95°26′01″W

Thompsonville is an unincorporated community in Jefferson County, Kansas, United States.

== History ==
It was established in 1851 by a group of Mormon settlers who refused to follow the main group led by Brigham Young into the Salt Lake Valley of Utah. Among those settlers was Emily Trask Cutler, one of the plural wives of Heber C. Kimball, counselor to Young and daughter of John Alpheus Cutler, who founded the Cutlerite sect at Manti, Iowa while en route with the main body to the Salt Lake Valley.

While there is no evidence that the founding group of the settlement had doctrinal differences with the main body of the church or were affiliated with the Cutlerite church, it is possible that they were opposed to the doctrine of polygamy inasmuch as Emily Cutler Kimball did not accompany the main group. It is equally likely that the group saw no need to go so far west when new frontier lands were open and available in the Kansas Territory and were actively recruiting new settlers from anti-slavery parts of the country.

However, the Mormon settlement did not last. Emily Cutler Kimball died not long after the settlement was established and is buried there. Two other Mormon women died there also, and until the mid-1960s the stones were still evident. Some of the settlers moved to Utah within the next two to five years as violence from the chaos of Bleeding Kansas intensified, while others may have given up their Mormon identity and blended in with the local populace.

The community was renamed Thompsonville in 1865 by C. L. Thompson, who erected a mill on the site of the old Mormon settlement of 1851. A post office was established in 1878 with C. T. Tolles as postmaster.

== Geography ==
The community is located on the Delaware River, about 11 miles (17½ km) southwest of Oskaloosa, the county seat, and 3 miles (5 km) northwest of Perry. It occupies a tiny portion of Section 8 of Kentucky Township (T11S R18E).

== See also ==
- Perry Lake and Perry State Park
