= Perry Lake (Kansas) =

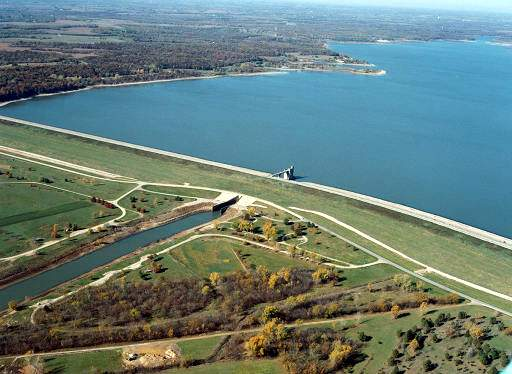
- Perry Dam

- Location within Kansas Location within the United States

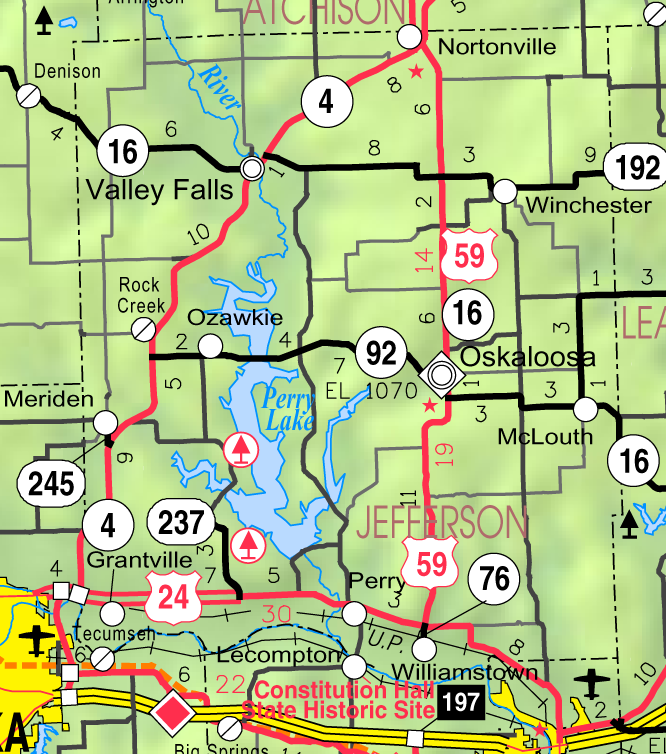
- KDOT map of Jefferson County (legend)
- Location: Jefferson County, Kansas
- Coordinates: 39°10′38″N 95°27′06″W
- Type: Reservoir
- Primary inflows: Delaware River
- Primary outflows: Delaware River
- Catchment area: 1,117 sq mi (2,890 km^{2})
- Basin countries: United States
- Managing agency: U.S. Army Corps of Engineers
- Built: 1964
- First flooded: January 15, 1969
- Max. length: 20 mi (32 km)
- Surface area: 11,146 acres (45.11 km^{2})
- Max. depth: 43 ft (13 m)
- Water volume: Full: 209,513 acre⋅ft (258,430,000 m^{3}); Current (Jan. 2016): 190,200 acre⋅ft (234,600,000 m^{3})
- Shore length^{1}: 160 mi (260 km)
- Surface elevation: Full: 892 ft (272 m); Current (Jan. 2016): 891 ft (272 m)
- Settlements: Perry, Newman, Ozawkie, Thompsonville, Lakeside Village
- ^{1} Shore length is not a well-defined measure.

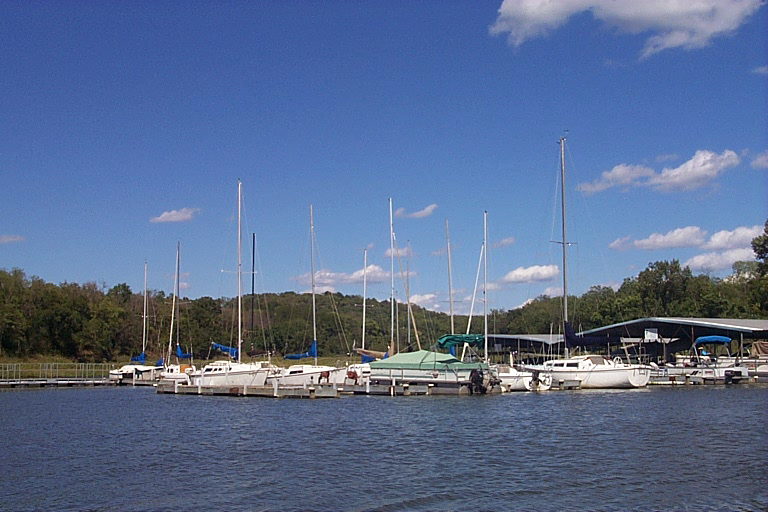
Sailboats and other watercraft in the Perry Lake marina.

Perry Lake is a US Army Corps of Engineers operated reservoir in northeast Kansas. Its primary purposes are flood control, water reserve for nearby areas and regional recreation. The lake is approximately 11,150 acres (45 km^{2}) in size, with over 160 miles (260 km) of shoreline. Perry Lake's full multi-purpose pool elevation is 891.5 feet (271.7 m) above sea level. Perry Lake is located about 40 miles (64 km) west of Kansas City, just northwest of Lawrence, Kansas. Its close proximity to Kansas City, Lawrence, and the state capitol, Topeka, make it a very popular destination, with the nickname "Paradise on the Plains".

== History ==
The dam was constructed on the Delaware River to help control flooding downstream in both the Delaware and Kansas rivers. Completed in 1966, the rolled earth fill dam is 7,750 feet (2,360 m) long and rises to 95 feet (29 m) in height above the stream bed, abating flooding for over 1,117 square miles (2,890 km^{2}) of northeast Kansas. In 1968 the U.S. Army Corps of Engineers reached a long term land usage lease with the Kansas Parks and Resources Department, allowing for the development of Perry State Park.

== Geography ==
Perry Lake is located at 39°10′38″N 95°27′06″W (39.1773424, -95.4516964) at an elevation of 892 feet (272 m). It lies in northeastern Kansas in the Dissected Till Plains region of North America's Central Lowlands. The entirety of the reservoir lies within Jefferson County.

The reservoir is impounded at its southern end by Perry Dam. The dam is located at 39°06′50″N 95°25′31″W (39.1138886, -95.4252525) at an elevation of 942 feet (287 m). The Delaware River is both the reservoir's primary inflow from the north and outflow to the south. Smaller tributaries include Duck Creek, French Creek, and Rock Creek from the west and Little Slough Creek, Slough Creek, and Evans Creek from the east.

U.S. Route 24 runs generally east-west approximately 2 miles (3.2 km) south of the dam. Kansas Highway 237 runs generally north-south from U.S. 24 into Perry State Park. There, it becomes West Lake Road, crossing the lake's southwestern arm, and then it turns to the west. Ferguson Road, a paved county road, runs generally north-south east of the reservoir, crossing its southeastern arm. Kansas Highway 92, which runs east-west, crosses the northern portion of the reservoir.

Several settlements lie on or near the reservoir. The largest is its namesake, the community of Perry, located on the Delaware River a few miles south of the dam. Ozawkie lies on the western shore at the lake's northern end. To the east and south of Ozawkie, a number of unincorporated communities lie on both sides of the lake. In order from north to south, these are: Lake Shore, Lakewood Hills, and Lakeside Village on the eastern shore and Indian Ridge, West Shore, Hilldale, Hilldale South, Lake Ridge, and Hickory Acres on the western shore. Thompsonville lies immediately south of the lake at the west end of the dam.

== Hydrography ==
The surface area, surface elevation, and water volume of the reservoir fluctuate based on inflow and local climatic conditions. In terms of capacity, the Corps of Engineers vertically divides the reservoir into a set of pools based on volume and water level, and the reservoir is considered full when filled to the capacity of its multi-purpose pool. When full, Perry Lake has a surface area of 11,146 acres (45.11 km^{2}), a surface elevation of 892 feet (272 m), and a volume of 209,513 acre-feet (258,430,000 m^{3}). When filled to maximum capacity, it has a surface area of 42,656 acres (172.62 km^{2}), a surface elevation of 941 feet (287 m), and a volume of 1,417,683 acre-feet (1.748686×10^{9} m^{3}).

The streambed underlying the reservoir has an elevation of 826 feet (252 m). Since the reservoir's initial flooding, sedimentation has gradually accumulated on the reservoir bottom thus raising its elevation.

== Activities ==
Perry State Park, located along the southwest part of Perry Lake, offers a wide variety of water recreation and outdoor activities:

- Boating: Boats and personal watercraft of all types are allowed. No limits are placed on horsepower, however boaters must follow all applicable state laws. Three marinas and multiple boat launch ramps are available around Perry Lake.
- Camping: The Army Corps of Engineers Slough Creek Campground offers 265 campsites in a mix of walk-in tent sites, sites with full electrical and water hookup, and two large designated group campsites. Perry State Park offers a further 102 campsites with full utility hookups and over 200 primitive campsites. Cabin rentals are also available from the state park.
- Equestrian activities: Perry State Park and the public use Corps of Engineers land has over 25 miles of horse trails for exploration. Primitive camping is allowed at select locations along the trails.
- Fishing: Bassmaster.com has named Perry Lake one of America's 100 best bass lakes. In addition to the white bass and largemouth bass, many other species of fish are also available to anglers including bluegill, channel catfish, crappie, sauger, and walleye.
- Hike/Bike trails: Nine bike trails of varying length and difficulty are provided. The Perry Lake Trail system for hikers has been nationally recognized.

== See also ==
- Perry Lake Trail
- Great Flood of 1951
- List of Kansas state parks
- List of lakes, reservoirs, and dams in Kansas
- List of rivers of Kansas
