= Delaware River Composite Truss Bridge =

Bridge in Kansas, U.S.

- U.S. National Register of Historic Places
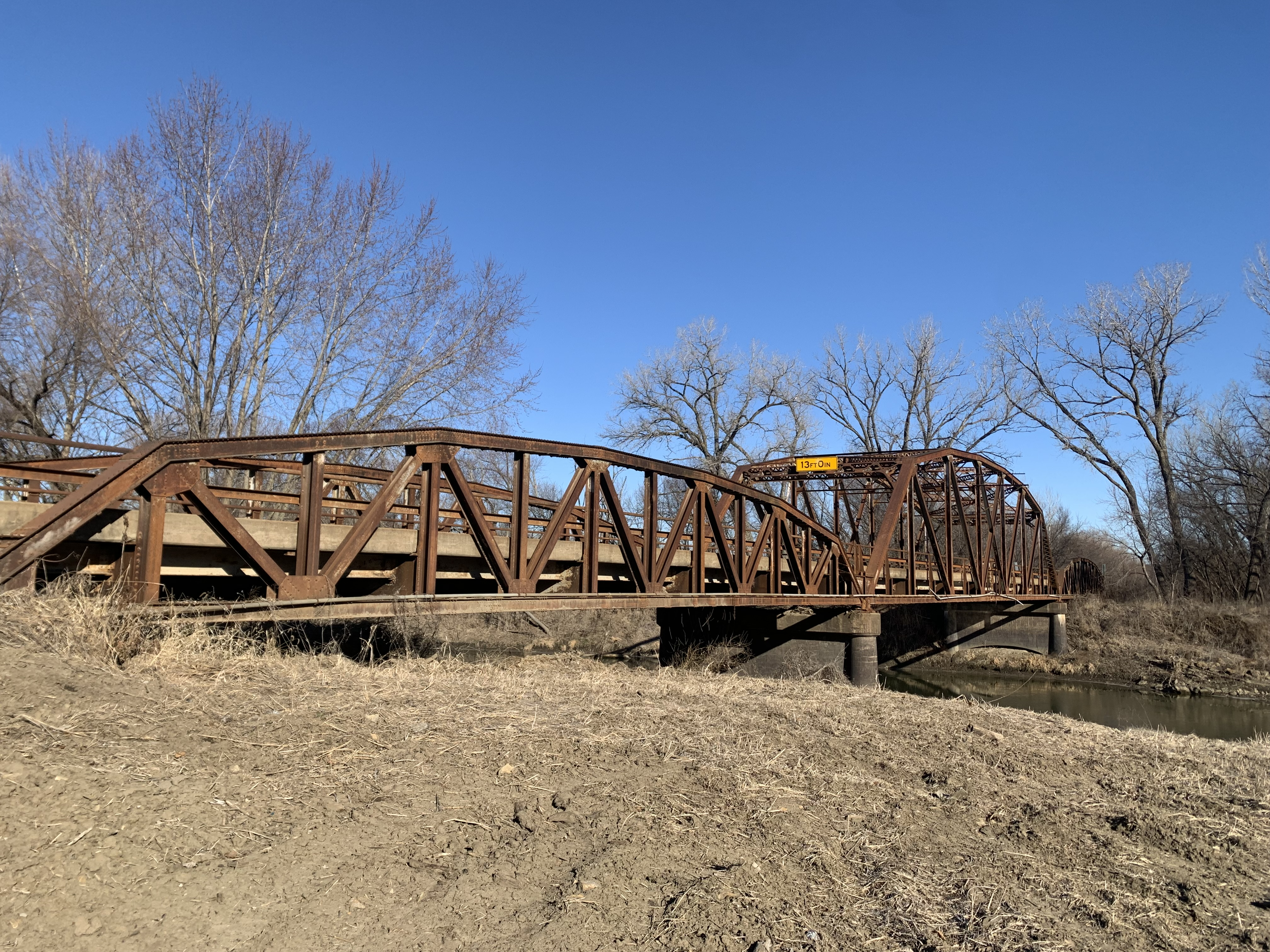
- Delaware River Composite Truss Bridge in Valley Falls, Kansas

- Location within Kansas Location within the United States
- Nearest city: Valley Falls, Kansas
- Coordinates: 39°21′03″N 95°27′17″W
- Area: less than one acre
- Built: 1936
- Architectural style: Parker Truss
- MPS: Metal Truss Bridges in Kansas 1861--1939 MPS
- NRHP reference No.: 03000371
- Added to NRHP: May 9, 2003

The Delaware River Composite Truss Bridge is a composite Parker truss and Warren truss bridge in Valley Falls, Kansas. It was built in 1936. It was listed on the National Register of Historic Places in 2003.

The central span is a riveted Parker through truss which is 152 feet (46 m) in length. That is flanked by two 103 feet (31 m) Warren pony truss spans. Each of the trusses has seven slopes forming its top chords.

It brings Coal Creek Road across the Delaware River, 0.1 miles south of the road's intersection with 170th Rd., at the city limits of Valley Falls.
