= Jacob Narverud =

- Born: April 14, 1986 (age 40); Meriden, Kansas, US
- Genres: Choral
- Occupations: Composer; Conductor
- Website: Official website

Jacob Narverud (born 1986, in Meriden, Kansas) is an American composer and conductor best known for his choral music. He is often ranked among the top-selling and most widely-performed choral composers in the United States.

== Background ==
Narverud is the editor of Santa Barbara Music Publishing, Inc. and a Signature Artist at Musicnotes, Inc. He is the Founding Artistic Director of the Tallgrass Chamber Choir, and was named Composer-in-Residence of the Boston Gay Men’s Chorus in 2024.He currently is a visiting Professor at Kansas State University, where he teaches graduate courses in choral conducting.

His music is published by Santa Barbara Music Publishing, Inc., Carl Fischer Music, Alfred Music, G. Schirmer, Hal Leonard, Shawnee Press, J. W. Pepper & Son, Alliance Music Publications, Inc., and Musicnotes, Inc.

Narverud holds a Bachelor’s Degree in Vocal Performance from Emporia State University, a Master of Music Degree and Doctor of Musical Arts degrees in conducting from the Conservatory of Music at the University of Missouri-Kansas City.

== List of compositions ==
=== Choral, accompanied ===
- Common Ground
- Dona Nobis Pacem
- Joy Joy
- Lovely Chance
- Songs for the People
- A Patch of Light
- Ad Astra
- Alchemy
- Echo
- Gravitas
- Hodie
- In the Silence
- Lakeside Lullaby
- Laudate Dominum
- Let the Music Fill Your Soul
- Love Never Leaves
- Lunar Lullaby
- May Wind
- Omnes Gentes
- O Quam Gloriosum
- Season of Light
- Sisi Ni Moja
- Sunflower
- Veritas et Virtus

=== Choral, unaccompanied ===
- Ascendo
- Great is the Sun
- Abend
- Agnus Dei
- Alleluia
- August
- Cantate
- Cónditor Alme Síderum
- Dominus Vobiscum
- Exsultate
- Harvest
- Healing Heart
- Loomis Creek
- Missa de Cinque Terre
- O Salutaris
- Sanctus
- Season of Light
- The Song We Sing
- Veni Sancte Spiritus
