= Puella =

Puella may refer to:

- Puella (geomancy), a geomantic figure
- Puella Dornblaser (1851–1904), American newspaper editor and temperance activist
- Puellae, a 1982 sculpture by Magdalena Abakanowicz
