= Jefferson West USD 340 =

Public school district in Meriden, Kansas

Address
- 601 E. Wyandotte St. Meriden, Kansas, 66512; United States
- Coordinates: 39.1869°N 95.5613°W

District information
- Type: Public
- Grades: PreK to 12
- Superintendent: Brad Neuenswander
- School board: BOE website
- Schools: 3
- NCES District ID: 2009510

Students and staff
- Students: 882
- District mascot: Tigers
- Colors: white black Red; Light gray

Other information
- Website: usd340.org

Jefferson West USD 340 is a public unified school district headquartered in Meriden, Kansas, United States. It serves the communities of Meriden, Ozawkie, Rock Creek, housing along the west side of Perry Lake, and rural areas. It covers 68 square miles (180 km^{2}) in parts of three counties (Jackson, Jefferson, and Shawnee) in the northeastern part of Kansas.

== Administration ==
The school district is currently under the administration of Superintendent Brad Neuenswander. Building principals are elementary school principal, Wes Sturgeon, middle school principal, Brenna Dooley, and high school principal, Rhonda Frakes.

== Board of education ==
The Jefferson West Board of Education currently meets on the second Monday of each month at the district office.

== Current schools ==
There are three public schools in the district, all of which are located in Meriden. The current schools are listed below:

- Jefferson West Elementary, K-4
- Jefferson West Middle School, 5-8
- Jefferson West High School, 9-12

== Former schools ==
Jefferson West Intermediate in Ozawkie used to serve grades four and five. At the end of the 2010 school year, the school was closed as a cost-saving measure. Prior to the closing of the school, the school system was as follows:

- Jefferson West Elementary (Meriden), K-3
- Jefferson West Intermediate (Ozawkie), 4-5
- Jefferson West Middle (Meriden), 6-8
- Jefferson West High (Meriden), 9-12

== See also ==
- Kansas State Department of Education
- Kansas State High School Activities Association
- List of high schools in Kansas
- List of unified school districts in Kansas
