= George M. Stafford =

American congressional aide

George M. Stafford (May 7, 1915 – June 16, 1995) was a commissioner and for a time chairman of the Interstate Commerce Commission, and also served as a longtime congressional aide and Republican Party official.

Stafford was born in Valley Falls, Kansas, where he was educated. After a brief stint in Kansas state government, he served in the U.S. Army during World War II, where he was wounded and decorated.

After the war, he involved himself in Republican politics in Kansas. He became executive secretary to Governor Frank Carlson, and when the governor became a senator, followed him to Washington. After seventeen years as Carlson's administrative assistant, Stafford was appointed by President Lyndon B. Johnson to the ICC in 1967. President Richard Nixon reappointed him in 1970, and then appointed him chairman later that year. Stafford remained as chairman until 1977, and as commissioner until 1980, when President Jimmy Carter did not reappoint him, and he retired.

Stafford was an opponent of the deregulation proposals of the transportation industries. This advocacy led President Gerald Ford to try to replace him as chairman, and eventually led to the end of his tenure on the I.C.C. After his retirement, Stafford lived in Bethesda, Maryland, until his death from kidney failure in Washington, D.C., in 1995.

== Early life and career ==
Stafford was born May 7, 1915, in Valley Falls, Kansas, where he grew up and graduated from high school. After high school, he attended a business college in Topeka, Kansas Stafford then served as deputy director of the Kansas Sales Tax Department from 1939 to 1942. 50 After the U.S. entered World War II, Stafford joined the U.S. Army. He rose to the rank of captain, was severely wounded fighting in the Philippines and received the Bronze Star and Purple Heart.

== Political career ==
Upon his return from his war service, Stafford became executive secretary to Kansas Governor Frank Carlson. Carlson was elected to the Senate in 1950, and took office later that year. Stafford accompanied him, and became Carlson's administrative assistant.

== Interstate Commerce Commission ==
In 1967, President Johnson appointed Stafford to the ICC. He was elected vice-chairman in 1969.

Since its 1887 founding, the ICC chairman had traditionally been a senior member of the commission, elected by commissioners usually on a rotating basis. Due to a Nixon proposal, adopted as Reorganizational Plan No. 1, President Nixon became the first president to appoint an ICC chairman. After appointing Stafford to a new, ten-year term on the commission, he appointed him as chairman as well.

Stafford was a staunch opponent of deregulation. After the Ford Administration brought in proposals to deregulate the trucking, airline, and railroad industries, President Ford found himself balked due to opposition on the ICC, led by Stafford. With Congress unwilling to implement reform without ICC support, Ford sought to use his appointment power to change the composition of the ICC. He was able to replace two commissioners, but his appointment of Warren Rudman to replace Stafford as chairman was not acted upon by the Senate before it adjourned before the 1976 elections. President Carter also sought to replace Stafford, and his appointment of A. Daniel O'Neal met with Senate confirmation in 1977. Though Stafford was no longer chairman, he was still a commissioner.

Carter was able to erode the anti-reform majority on the commission by allowing terms to expire and not replacing or reappointing the commissioners. By 1979, there was a reform majority on the commission, Carter finally named two pro-reform commissioners, and legislation was finally enacted. When Stafford's term expired in 1980, Carter did not reappoint him.

== Later life ==
Having lived in the Washington area since 1950, Stafford retired to his home in Bethesda. He died of kidney failure at Sibley Memorial Hospital on June 16, 1995.
