= Perry Lake Trail =

Hiking trail in Kansas

Coordinates: 39°08′13.90″N 95°26′01.90″W

The Lake Perry Trail is a 29-mile (47 km) trail located in the Northeastern section of Kansas by Lake Perry. This trail is commonly referred to as the "Old Military Trail" because it was created by the U.S. Army Corps of Engineers.

== Hiking ==
Although the trail is maintained regularly some sections of the trail may be covered with underbrush and/or mowed away as the trail crosses uncommonly used sections and fields. The popular season for hiking the Lake Perry Trail is from June until late August.

From April until September hiking along portions of the trail become difficult as the amount of spider webs and ticks increase with the humid climate. Proper preparations and equipment is suggested to ward off these nuisances.

Four miles of the trail are along dirt roads. These roads connect two sections of the trail together.

== Camping ==
Camping is not allowed along the trail. However, there are campsites in two designated campgrounds along the trail. The Old Military Trail Campground and the Slough Creek and Longview Park areas provide adequate camping for the amount of hikers that trek annually.

== Wildlife ==
Bald eagles, hawks, deer, wild turkey and other small mammals all make Lake Perry their home during parts of the year. Wild animals are seen from the trail frequently.
