= Ninnescah River =

River in Kansas, United States

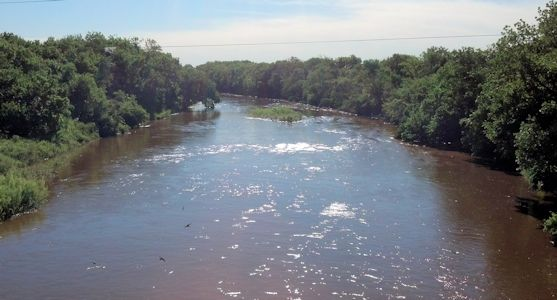
- Ninnescah River at Peck, Kansas

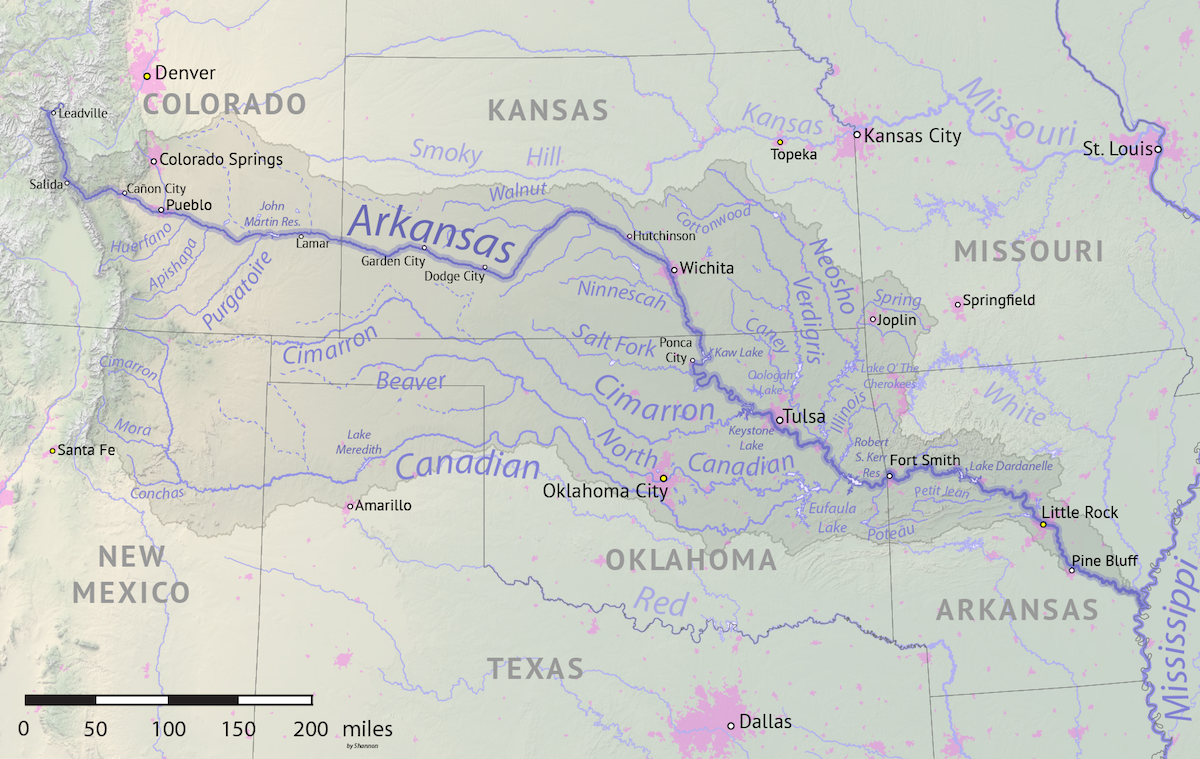
- Map of the Arkansas River watershed including the Ninnescah River

Location
- Country: United States
- State: Kansas

Physical characteristics
- Source confluence
  - location: Sedgwick County, Kansas
  - coordinates: 37°34′05″N 97°42′19″W
  - elevation: 1,302 ft (397 m)
- Mouth: Arkansas River
  - location: Sumner County, Kansas
  - coordinates: 37°19′17″N 97°09′59″W
  - elevation: 1,152 ft (351 m)
- Length: 56 mi (90 km)
- Basin size: 2,129 sq mi (5,510 km^{2})
- Discharge
  - location: USGS 07145500 near Peck, KS
  - average: 522 cu ft/s (14.8 m^{3}/s)
  - minimum: 0.2 cu ft/s (0.0057 m^{3}/s)
  - maximum: 33,700 cu ft/s (950 m^{3}/s)

Basin features
- Tributaries
  - left: North Fork Ninnescah River
  - right: South Fork Ninnescah River
- Watersheds: Ninnescah-Arkansas- Mississippi

The Ninnescah River is a river in the central Great Plains of North America. Its entire 56.4-mile (90.8 km) length lies within the U.S. state of Kansas. It is a tributary of the Arkansas River.

== Geography ==
The Ninnescah River originates in the Wellington Lowlands of south-central Kansas. It is formed in southwestern Sedgwick County by the confluence of the North Fork Ninnescah River and the South Fork Ninnescah River. From there, it flows southeast into the Arkansas River Lowlands. It empties into the Arkansas River roughly 3 miles (4.8 km) north of Oxford, Kansas in eastern Sumner County.

== See also ==
- List of rivers in Kansas
