= Cow Creek (Kansas) =

River in Kansas, United States

Cow Creek Big Cow Creek

Location
- Country: United States
- State: Kansas
- Region: Great Plains
- City: Hutchinson, KS

Physical characteristics
- Source
  - location: Near Beaver, KS, Great Plains, Kansas, United States
  - coordinates: 38°38′37″N 098°39′10″W
  - elevation: 1,483 ft (452 m)
- Mouth: Arkansas River
  - location: Hutchinson, Kansas, United States
  - coordinates: 37°58′47″N 097°50′24″W
  - elevation: 452 ft (138 m)
- Length: 112 mi (180 km), East
- Basin size: 859.5 mi^{2} (2,226 km^{2})
- Discharge
  - location: Hutchinson
  - average: 1,230 cu ft/s (35 m^{3}/s)

Basin features
- River system: Arkansas River watershed

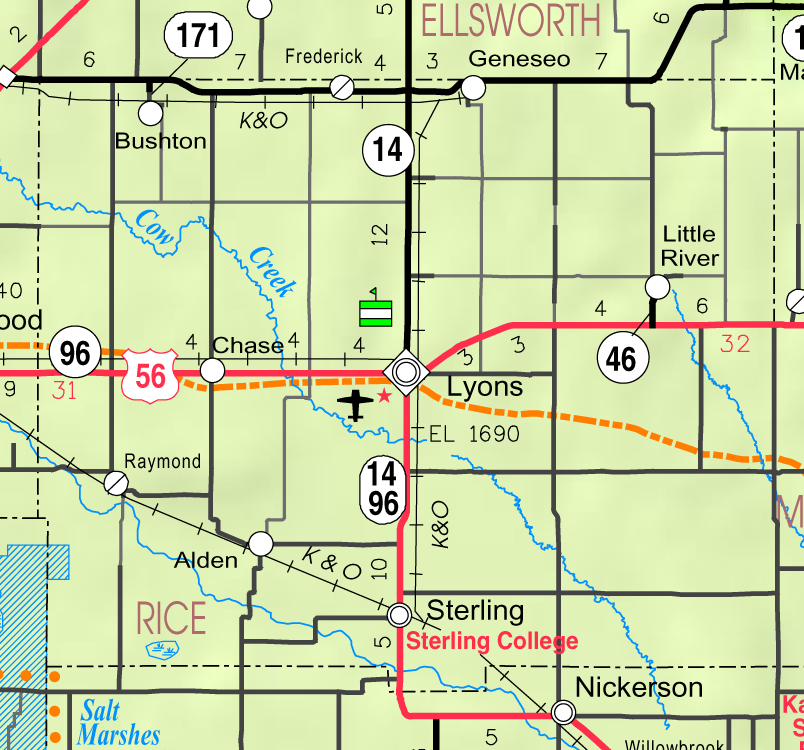
Map of Rice County from KDOT (map legend)

Cow Creek is a 112-mile-long (180 km) stream that flows through Rice and Reno Counties, Kansas. Cow Creek is a tributary of the Arkansas River; its confluence with the Arkansas is about ten miles southeast of Hutchinson, Kansas.

In the 1850s, Buffalo Bill Mathewson ran a trading post (known as "Buffalo Bill's Well") where the Santa Fe Trail crossed Cow Creek. From Lyons, Kansas, the well is located four miles west and one mile south.

== See also ==
- List of rivers of Kansas

== External links and references ==
- U.S. Geological Survey Geographic Names Information System: Cow Creek
- ""
- Historical marker cow creek station
- "Santa Fe Trail Research". View From USGS Aerial Photographs.
- Louise Barry, The Ranch at Cow Creek Crossing (Beach Valley, P. O.)
  - Alternate site
- Donald O. Whittemore, TMDL Salt Assessment and Analysis: Chloride Impairment in the Gar-Peace and Cow Subbasins of the Lower Arkansas River Basin. Cow Creek Subbasin
