= Indian Creek (Neosho River tributary) =

Stream in Allen and Anderson County, Kansas, U.S.

Coordinates: 37.980033°N 95.500539°W

Indian Creek is a stream in Allen County, Kansas, and Anderson County, Kansas, in the United States. It is a tributary of the Neosho River.

Indian Creek was so named due to an early settler finding a fresh Native American grave on its banks.

== See also ==
- List of rivers of Kansas
