= North Fork Ninnescah River =

River in Kansas, United States

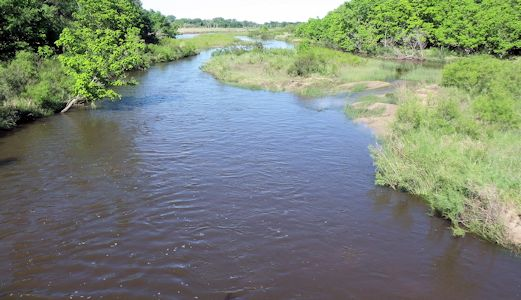
- North Fork Ninnescah River above Cheney Reservoir

Location
- Country: United States
- State: Kansas

Physical characteristics
- Source
  - location: Stafford County, Kansas
  - coordinates: 37°50′07″N 98°44′56″W
  - elevation: 1,942 ft (592 m)
- Mouth: Ninnescah River
  - location: Sedgwick County, Kansas
  - coordinates: 37°34′05″N 97°42′19″W
  - elevation: 1,302 ft (397 m)
- Basin size: 930 mi^{2} (2,400 km^{2})
- Discharge
  - location: USGS 07144795 at Cheney Dam, KS
  - average: 119 cu ft/s (3.4 m^{3}/s)
  - minimum: 0 cu ft/s (0 m^{3}/s)
  - maximum: 1,910 cu ft/s (54 m^{3}/s)

Basin features
- Watersheds: North Fork Ninnescah- Ninnescah-Arkansas- Mississippi

The North Fork Ninnescah River is a river in the central Great Plains of North America. Its entire length lies within the U.S. state of Kansas. It is a tributary of the Ninnescah River.

== Geography ==
The North Fork Ninnescah River originates in south-central Kansas in the Arkansas River Lowlands. Its source lies in extreme south-central Stafford County approximately 11.5 miles (18.5 km) south of St. John, Kansas. From there, it flows generally northeast before turning to the southeast near Plevna, Kansas. It then flows across a far eastern portion of the High Plains into Cheney Reservoir in the Wellington Lowlands. From the reservoir's dam, the river continues southeast to its confluence with the South Fork Ninnescah River in southwestern Sedgwick County to form the Ninnescah River.

== History ==
In 1965, the U.S. Bureau of Reclamation completed a dam on the river north of Cheney, Kansas for flood control and municipal water supply, creating Cheney Reservoir.

== See also ==
- List of rivers of Kansas
