= Shoal Creek (Spring River tributary) =

Stream in Missouri, U.S.

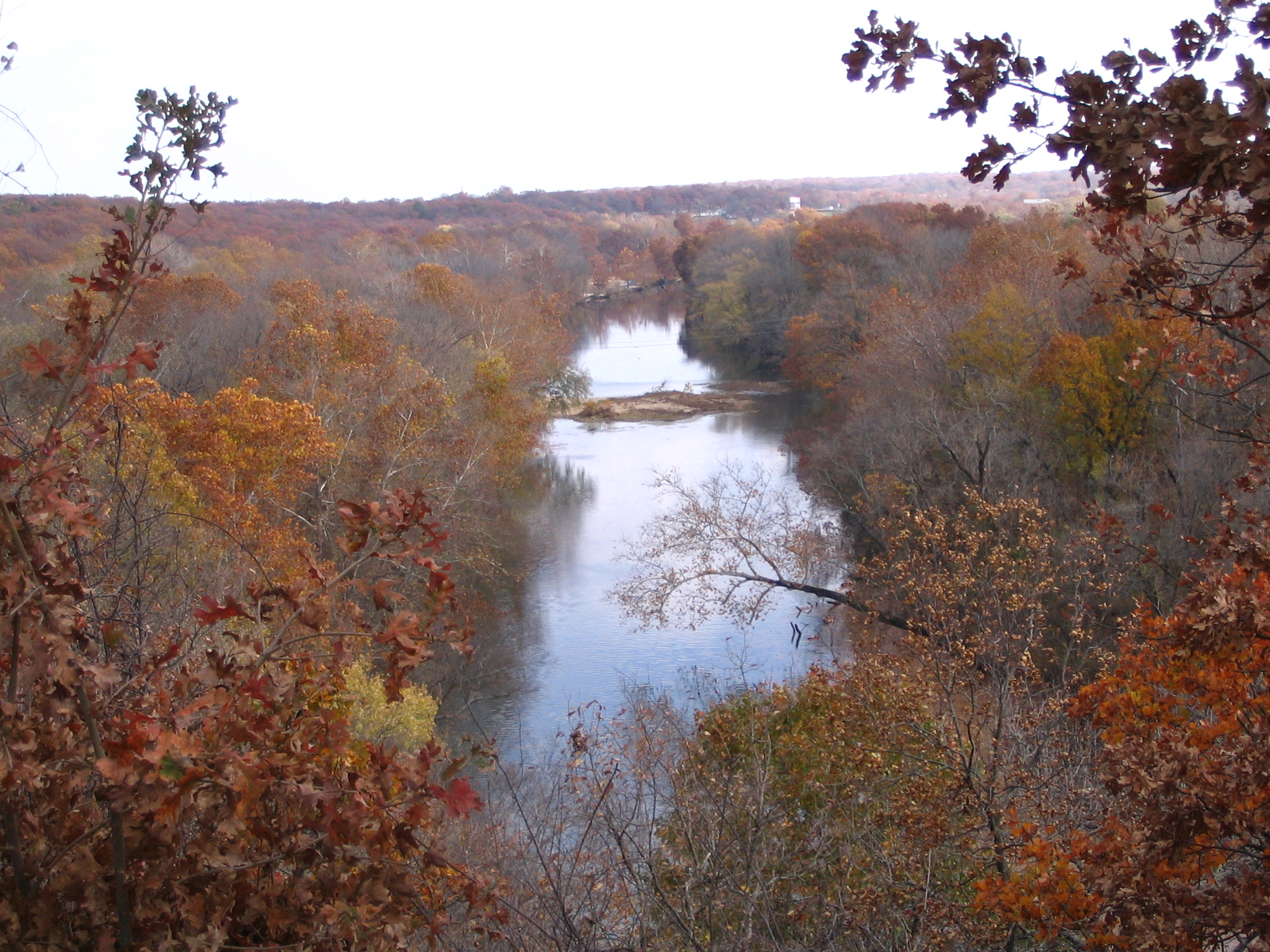
- Shoal Creek from Inspiration Point, near Joplin, Missouri

Location
- Country: United States
- State: Missouri
- Region: Southwest Missouri - Southeast Kansas

Physical characteristics
- Source
  - location: Barry County, Missouri
  - coordinates: 36°38′51″N 93°57′45″W
- Mouth: Spring River
  - location: Cherokee County, Kansas
  - coordinates: 37°03′17″N 94°42′03″W
  - elevation: 246 m (807 ft)
- Discharge
  - average: 431 cu ft/s (12.2 m^{3}/s)

Shoal Creek is an 81.5-mile-long (131.2 km) stream tributary of the Spring River in southwest Missouri and southeast Kansas. It begins in Barry County, Missouri southwest of Exeter and flows west through Newton county in Missouri before emptying into the Spring River near Riverton in Cherokee County, Kansas.

== Grand Falls ==
South of Joplin the stream flows over Grand Falls, a large waterfall that spans the entire creek from bank to bank. In the 1890s a hydroelectric plant was built at the site but has since been abandoned. A theatre, boat houses, a German Village and a dance pavilion were built by the falls in the early 20th century and the Missouri Pacific Railroad shuttled visitors to the site.

== See also ==
- List of rivers of Kansas
- List of rivers of Missouri
