= South Fork Ninnescah River =

River in Kansas, United States

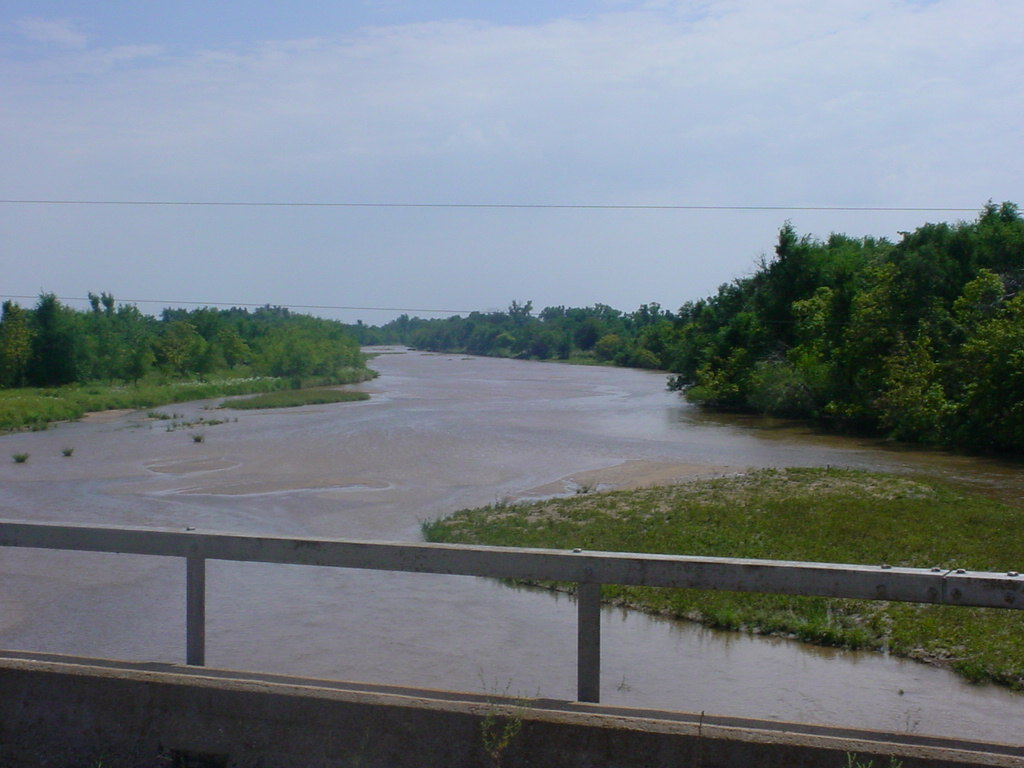
- The South Fork Ninnescah River south of Murdock, Kansas (2006)

Location
- Country: United States
- State: Kansas

Physical characteristics
- Source
  - location: Pratt County, Kansas
  - coordinates: 37°36′20″N 98°55′42″W
  - elevation: 2,071 ft (631 m)
- Mouth: Ninnescah River
  - location: Sedgwick County, Kansas
  - coordinates: 37°34′05″N 97°42′19″W
  - elevation: 1,302 ft (397 m)

Basin features
- Watersheds: South Fork Ninnescah- Ninnescah-Arkansas- Mississippi

The South Fork Ninnescah River is a river in the central Great Plains of North America. Its entire length lies within the U.S. state of Kansas. It is a tributary of the Ninnescah River.

== Geography ==
The South Fork Ninnescah River originates in south-central Kansas in the High Plains. Its source lies in west-central Pratt County approximately 2 miles (3.2 km) southwest of Cullison, Kansas. From there, it flows generally east into the Wellington Lowlands. In southwestern Sedgwick County, it meets the North Fork Ninnescah River to form the Ninnescah River.

== See also ==
- List of rivers of Kansas
