= Mission Creek (Kansas) =

Creek in Kansas

Coordinates: 39°03′52″N 95°50′06″W

Mission Creek is a stream west of Topeka, Kansas, United States. The 30-mile-long (48 km) tributary of the Kansas River sources from Wabaunsee County and flows through Shawnee County, Kansas, passing to the west of Topeka, until it deposits in the Kansas River. Mission Creek was named for a Kaw mission near the banks.

== See also ==
- Dover, Kansas
- List of rivers of Kansas
