= Motor Carrier Act of 1980 =

United States federal law; deregulated trucking

The Motor Carrier Regulatory Reform and Modernization Act, more commonly known as the Motor Carrier Act of 1980 (MCA) is a United States federal law which deregulated the trucking industry.

== Background ==
Motor carrier deregulation was a part of a sweeping reduction in price controls, entry controls, and collective vendor price setting in United States transportation, begun in 1970-71 with initiatives in the Richard Nixon Administration, carried out through the Gerald Ford and Jimmy Carter Administrations, and continued into the 1980s, collectively seen as a part of deregulation in the United States.

Since the passage of the Interstate Commerce Act of 1887, the federal government had regulated various transportation modes, starting with the railroad industry, and later the trucking and airline industries. Increasing public interest in deregulation led to a series of federal laws beginning in 1976 with the Railroad Revitalization and Regulatory Reform Act. The deregulation of the trucking industry began with the Motor Carrier Act of 1980, which was signed into law by President Carter on July 1, 1980.

Studies of the legislative process leading up to passage of the MCA indicate that the Act resulted from a concert of action by the Carter Administration, Congressional leaders, including Senator Ted Kennedy, an extensive coalition of "civil society" organizations which was a follow-on to coalitions created for rail and air transport regulatory reforms, and Interstate Commerce Commissioners appointed by Presidents Nixon and Carter who supported the pro-competition objectives of the legislative initiatives of 1971 to 1980 (notably A. Daniel O'Neal and Darius Gaskins).

The MCA was envisioned to be a sweeping de-regulation of the trucking industry. When President Carter signed the bill, he proclaimed:

This is historic legislation. It will remove 45 years of excessive and inflationary Government restrictions and redtape. It will have a powerful anti-inflationary effect, reducing consumer costs by as much as $8 billion each year. And by ending wasteful practices, it will conserve annually hundreds of millions of gallons of precious fuel. All the citizens of our Nation will benefit from this legislation. Consumers will benefit, because almost every product we purchase has been shipped by truck, and outmoded regulations have inflated the prices that each one of us must pay. The shippers who use trucking will benefit as new service and price options appear. Labor will benefit from increased job opportunities. And the trucking industry itself will benefit from greater flexibility and new opportunities for innovation.

== Contents ==
The Act prohibited rate bureaus from interfering with any carrier's rights to publish its own rates. As implemented, it removed most rate making from the rate bureaus, eliminated most restrictions on commodities that could be carried, and deregulated the routes that motor carriers could use and the geographic regions that they could serve. The law authorized truckers to price freely within a "zone of reasonableness" and so truckers could increase or decrease rates from current levels by 15 percent without challenge. They were encouraged to make independent rate filings with even larger price changes.

A particularly interesting aspect of the legislation is that it was implemented more aggressively, in a pro-competitive direction, than it was written. Promoting independent pricing and open entry were critical to achieving a level of competition, which was made possible by the characteristics of the trucking industry. Under Darius Gaskins, the Chair of the Interstate Commerce Commission in the period immediately following passage of this Act, entry controls were dramatically reduced. In addition, the Commission interpreted the Act to allow contract rate making without regulatory review, and it opened the field for transport brokers, which could manage better match-ups between the demand for transport services and the availability of carriers.

Before the law, the industry had simply passed along higher wages and operating costs to shippers. The law had far-reaching consequences, causing a general price reduction for consumer packaged goods, greater price competition, and lower profit margins.

== Aftermath ==
Since the law was passed, the number of new firms has increased dramatically, especially low-cost, non-union carriers. By 1990, the number of licensed carriers exceeded 40,000, more than twice as in 1980. Combined with the Staggers Act (1980), intermodal freight transport surged, expanding 70 percent between 1981 and 1986.

Deregulation allowed manufacturers to reduce inventories, to move their products more quickly, and to be more responsive to customers. Consumers indirectly benefited from the more efficient, lower-cost transport of goods, according to a comprehensive study from the Department of Transportation.

== See also ==
- Motor Carrier Act of 1935
- Staggers Rail Act of 1980

== Bibliography ==
- Moore, Thomas Gale. "Rail and Truck Reform: The Record So Far". Regulation (November/December 1988).
- Organization for Economic Cooperation and Development. International Conference. Road Transport Deregulation: Experience, Evaluation, Research. November 1988.
- Robyn, Dorothy, Braking the Special Interests, University of Chicago Press, 1987.
- Belzer, Michael H. (August 24, 2000). Sweatshops on Wheels: Winners and Losers in Trucking Deregulation (Hardcover). Oxford University Press, USA. p. 272. ISBN 0-19-512886-9. ISBN 978-0-19-512886-4.
