= A. Daniel O'Neal =

American lawyer

Arthur Daniel O'Neal
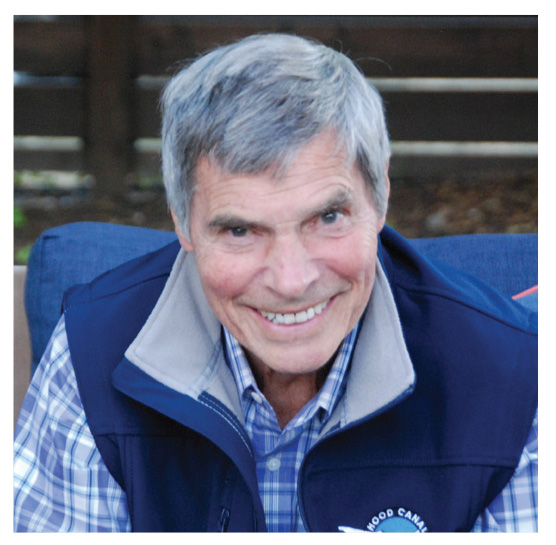
- Born: May 15, 1936; Bremerton, Washington
- Died: October 10, 2017 (aged 81); Belfair, Washington
- Occupations: Attorney, businessperson
- Known for: Interstate Commerce Commission chairperson
- Spouse: Diane Gay O'Neal (married August 5, 1961)
- Children: Daniel Stewart (b. 1962); Reed Kazis (b. 1964); David Christopher (b. 1966); Beth Marie (b. 1969)
- Parent(s): Arthur Daniel O'Neal, Sr. Louise Ragna Nordahl O'Neal

Arthur Daniel O'Neal Jr. (May 15, 1936 – October 10, 2017) was an American businessman. He chaired both the Washington State Transportation Commission and the (U.S.) Interstate Commerce Commission. He was on the board of directors at The Greenbrier Companies (GBX) until 2016.

== Life ==
Arthur Daniel O'Neal Jr., was born to Arthur Daniel O'Neal Sr. and Louise Ragna O'Neal (née Nordahl) on May 15, 1936 in Bremerton, Washington. He went to Bremerton High School and studied Mathematics at Whitman College graduating in 1959. After graduating from the Naval Officer Candidate School (July 1959 - November 1959) in Newport, O'Neal reported to the USS Watts, a World War II destroyer. He served as a technical officer on that destroyer from 1959 to 1961. From 1961 to 1963, he served on the USS Charles E. Brannon, a destroyer escort. In 1965 he graduated from the University of Washington Law School. In 1966, O'Neal came on as Staff Counsel for the US Senate Commerce Committee. He served as legal assistant for the long-serving U.S. Senator Warren G. Magnuson of Washington from 1967 to 1969.

Until 1973, he was Counsel for the Surface Transportation Subcommittee at the US Senate. During this time, he was involved, among other things, in the legislation for the establishment of the passenger transport company Amtrak. In 1973 he joined the Interstate Commerce Commission, appointed by Richard M. Nixon. Subsequently, President Jimmy Carter re-appointed him and made him Chairman of the Interstate Commerce Commission, a position he held from April 5, 1977 to December 31, 1979. During this time, he was also a member of the Supervisory Board of the United States Railway Association, the organizational mother of the freight company Conrail. During his term of office, he reformed Interstate Commerce Commission's internal organization and pushed ahead deregulation, especially in freight transport. He worked to reform railroad practices and protect the consumer. While on the commission he helped get the Motor Carrier Act of 1980 enacted.

In 1980, Daniel O'Neal began his private sector law career at Houger, Garvey, Schubert, Adams and Barer. He came into contact with The Greenbrier Companies and took over a seat on the Supervisory Board of the subsidiary Gunderson Inc. (1985-2005). In 1984 he became Chairman of the Supervisory Board of Greenbrier Intermodal. He held this position until 1994, but he became inactive from 1989 onwards, since he bought a transportation logistics company this year after the death of the owner Fred H. Tolan and renamed the company Tolan O'Neal Transportation & Logistics Inc. In 1996, the company was fully taken over by Greenbrier and integrated into the newly founded company Greenbrier Logistics Inc. with O'Neal as chairman until 1997. In 1994, he was appointed to the Supervisory Board of The Greenbrier Companies. Daniel O'Neal served as Chairman of the Greenbrier Autostack Corporation from 1989 to 1996. From 1998 to 2011, he worked directly with Greenbrier as a consultant and lobbyist. Since then he has been working freelance in this field. He gave up his seat on the Supervisory Board at Greenbrier in January 2016.

In 2003, he was appointed by Governor Gary Locke to the Washington State Transportation Commission. In 2008, he was elected Chairman. In 2007 Governor Christine Gregoire appointed him to the Puget Sound Leadership Council. and in 2009 she appointed him for another term with the Washington State Transportation Commission until 2015. He joined the board of directors for the Hood Canal Salmon Center in 2003. While on the board he worked to monitor and improve salmon habitat on Hood Canal.

In 1961 he married Diane Gay Reedy. With her he has four children.

His papers are variously in the collections of Stanford University and the Hoover Institution.
