= Thomas Gale Moore =

American economist (1930–2024)

- Born: November 6, 1930; Washington, D.C., U.S.
- Died: August 23, 2024 (aged 93)
- Education: George Washington University (BA), University of Chicago (MA, PhD)
- Occupation: Economist
- Employer(s): Hoover Institution, Council of Economic Advisers
- Notable work: Climate of Fear; Freight Transportation Regulation

Thomas Gale Moore (November 6, 1930 – August 23, 2024) was an American economist known for his work on international trade, deregulation, and environmental policy. He served as a member of the Council of Economic Advisers under President Ronald Reagan from 1985 to 1989 and was a senior fellow at the Hoover Institution at Stanford University.

== Early life and education ==
Moore was born in Washington, D.C., on November 6, 1930. He briefly attended the Massachusetts Institute of Technology before serving in the U.S. Navy during the Korean War. He earned his B.A. in economics from George Washington University in 1957 and his M.A. and Ph.D. in economics from the University of Chicago by 1961.

== Academic and policy career ==
After completing his doctorate, Moore taught economics at Carnegie Institute of Technology (now Carnegie Mellon University), Michigan State University, Stanford University, and UCLA. He joined the Hoover Institution in 1974 and remained affiliated for the rest of his career.

In the 1970s, Moore became a leading voice in the movement to deregulate surface transportation. His 1972 monograph, Freight Transportation Regulation, published by the American Enterprise Institute, analyzed inefficiencies in the regulatory structure imposed by the Interstate Commerce Commission. Moore argued that restrictive entry and rate-setting practices led to artificially high costs and economic waste. These arguments helped shape the intellectual foundation for federal legislation including the Motor Carrier Act of 1980 and the Staggers Rail Act of 1980.

In 1986, Moore published a study in the Journal of Law and Economics on the effects of airline deregulation, which has since been cited over 250 times in economic and legal literature.

== Government service ==
Moore served twice on the Council of Economic Advisers—first as a senior staff economist (1968–1970), and later as a full member (1985–1989) under President Ronald Reagan. During this time, he advised on trade policy, taxation, energy, transportation, and environmental regulation. He also chaired the President’s National Critical Materials Council and served on the National Commission on Superconductivity.

== Views and writing ==
Moore was known for challenging prevailing views on climate change and environmental regulation. In works such as Climate of Fear (1998) and In Sickness or in Health: The Kyoto Protocol versus Global Warming (2000), he argued that climate change effects were overstated and that mitigation efforts often failed cost-benefit tests. His views drew criticism but also aligned with libertarian and free-market environmental policy circles.

He was also an advocate for privatization in former communist economies and explored intersections of economics with psychology and religion.

=== Opposition to war ===
From 2004 to 2008 Moore was a frequent contributor to the website antiwar.com.

== Personal life ==
Moore married Cassandra Chrones in 1958. They had two children and resided in Palo Alto, California.

== Legacy ==
Moore died on August 23, 2024. He is remembered for his influence on federal deregulation efforts, especially in the transportation sector, and for bringing academic economic analysis into public policy debates. His research and advocacy contributed to a wider shift in U.S. regulatory thinking during the 1980s.

== Selected publications ==
- The Economics of the American Theatre (1968)
- Freight Transportation Deregulation (co-editor, 1972)
- Climate of Fear: Why We Shouldn't Worry about Global Warming (1998)
- Global Warming: A Boon to Humans and Other Animals (1995)
- In Sickness or in Health: The Kyoto Protocol versus Global Warming (2000)
- The Essence of Stigler (co-editor, 1986)
- Central Planning USA-Style: The Case Against CAFE Standards (1991)
- Privatization Now or Else (1991)

== Affiliations ==
Moore held roles at:

- Hoover Institution (Senior Fellow)
- Cato Institute (Adjunct Scholar)
- Competitive Enterprise Institute, Independent Institute, Heritage Foundation, Reason Foundation, and National Center for Policy Analysis
