= Delaware River (Kansas) =

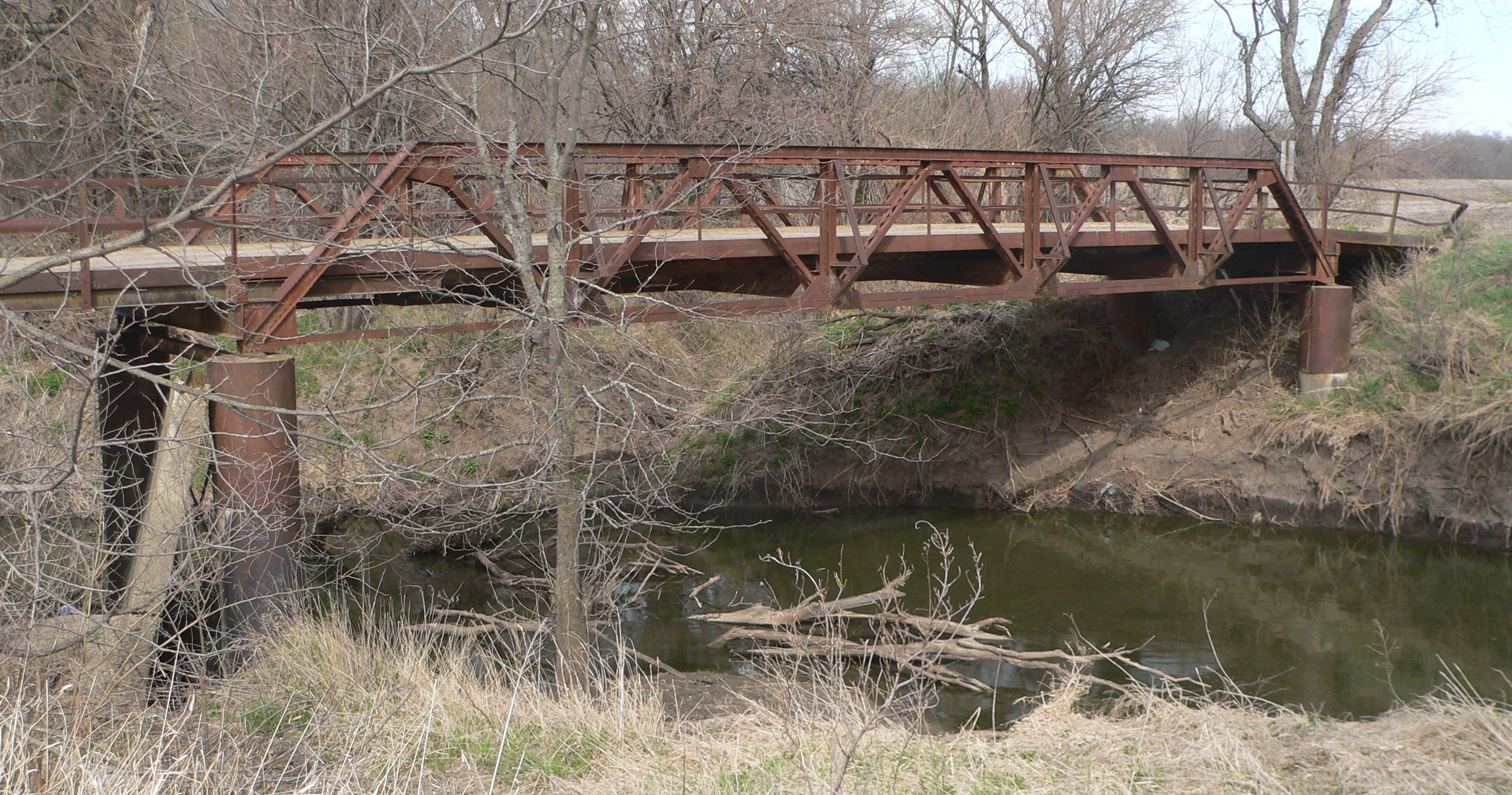

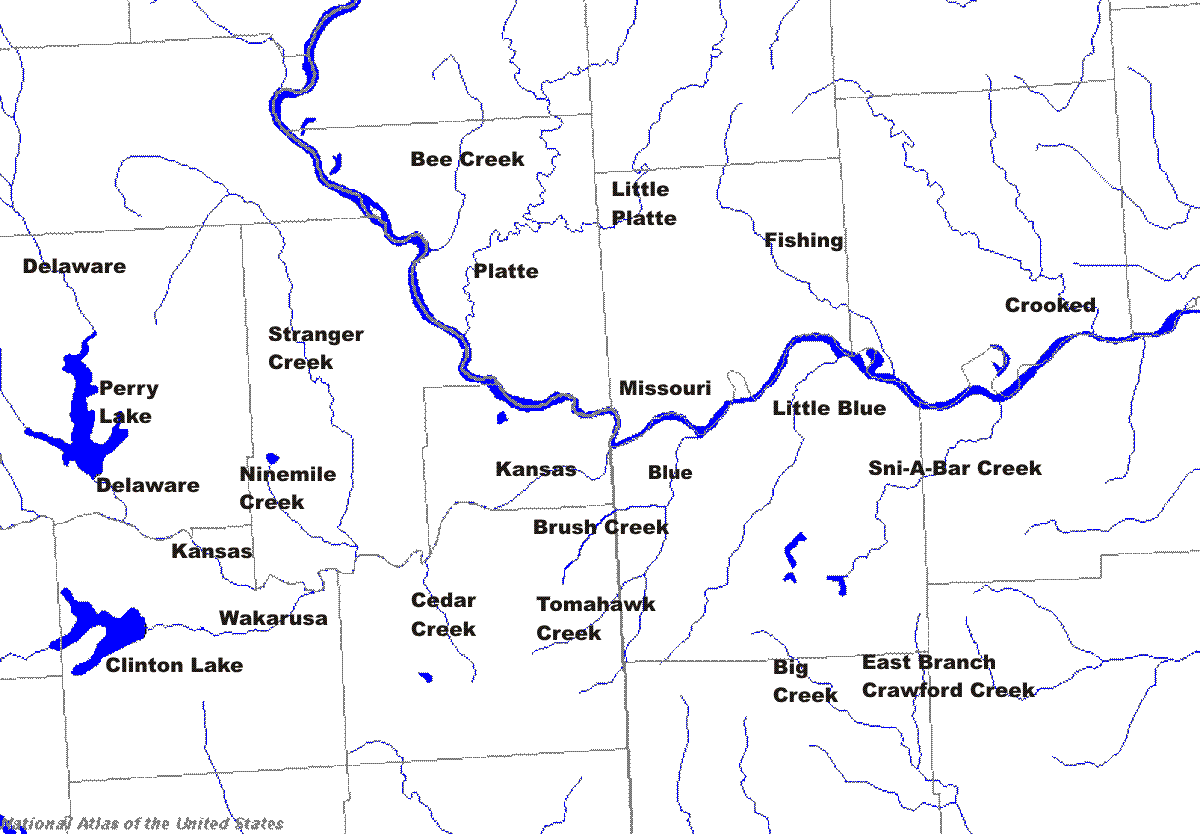
- Kansas City metropolitan rivers with the Delaware in the northwest

Location
- Country: United States
- State: Kansas

Physical characteristics
- Source
  - location: Northeast Nemaha County, Kansas, United States
  - coordinates: 39°55′40″N 95°50′15″W
  - elevation: 827 ft (252 m)
- Mouth: Kansas River
  - location: Near Perry, Kansas, United States
  - coordinates: 39°03′33″N 95°23′52″W
  - elevation: 252 ft (77 m)
- Length: 94 mi (151 km), North-South
- Discharge
  - location: Perry, Kansas
  - average: 654 cu/ft. per sec.

Basin features
- River system: Kansas River watershed

The Delaware River (originally called the Grasshopper River) is a 94-mile-long (151 km) river located in the northeastern part of the state of Kansas. The Delaware River basin drains 1,117 square miles (2,890 km^{2}) from the outflow of the Perry Lake reservoir. The river has been classified as a Category 1 watershed by the Kansas Department of Health and Environment, meaning that the watershed is in need of immediate restoration and protection. The river is one of the major tributaries of the Kansas River.

== Course ==
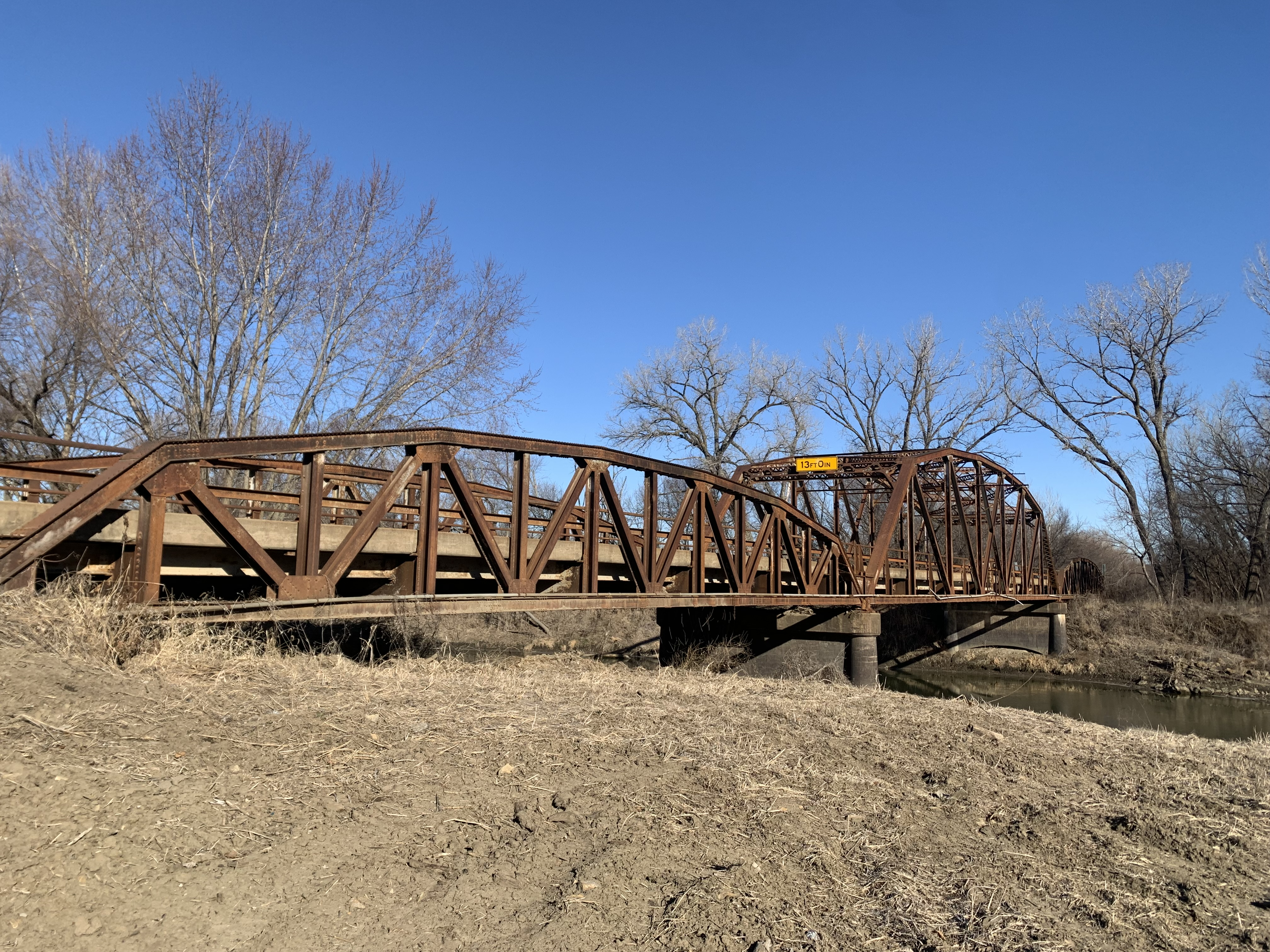
Delaware River Composite Truss Bridge in Valley Falls

The Delaware River rises west of Sabetha, Kansas in Nemaha County. The river's course is generally southeast through the counties of Nemaha, Brown, Jackson, Atchison, and Jefferson in northeast Kansas. The Delaware passes through The Kickapoo Nation Reservation and is an important river for the tribe. Some of its main tributaries include Grasshopper Creek, Muddy Creek, Elk Creek, Straight Creek, Cedar Creek and Rock Creek. The Delaware's course takes it through rich farmland and this gives the river's water a very muddy appearance. Just south of Valley Falls the river enters Perry Lake, a man made reservoir to control flooding. It then enters the Kansas River just north of Lecompton, Kansas. Some cities within 10 miles (16 km) of the river include, Sabetha, Fairview, Powhattan, Horton, Whiting, Muscotah, Holton, Valley Falls, Ozawkie, Perry, and Lecompton, Kansas.

In Valley Falls it is crossed by the Delaware River Composite Truss Bridge, built in 1936, which is listed on the National Register of Historic Places.

== Recreation ==
The river forms Perry Reservoir, which is a major regional lake for boating, swimming, camping, fishing and other activities. The river is also great for fishing, and some of the dominant fish of the river include channel catfish, flathead catfish, carp, longnose gar, drum, sauger, crappie, and white bass.

== See also ==
- List of Kansas rivers
- Lakes, reservoirs, and dams in Kansas
