= Meriden, Kansas =

- City
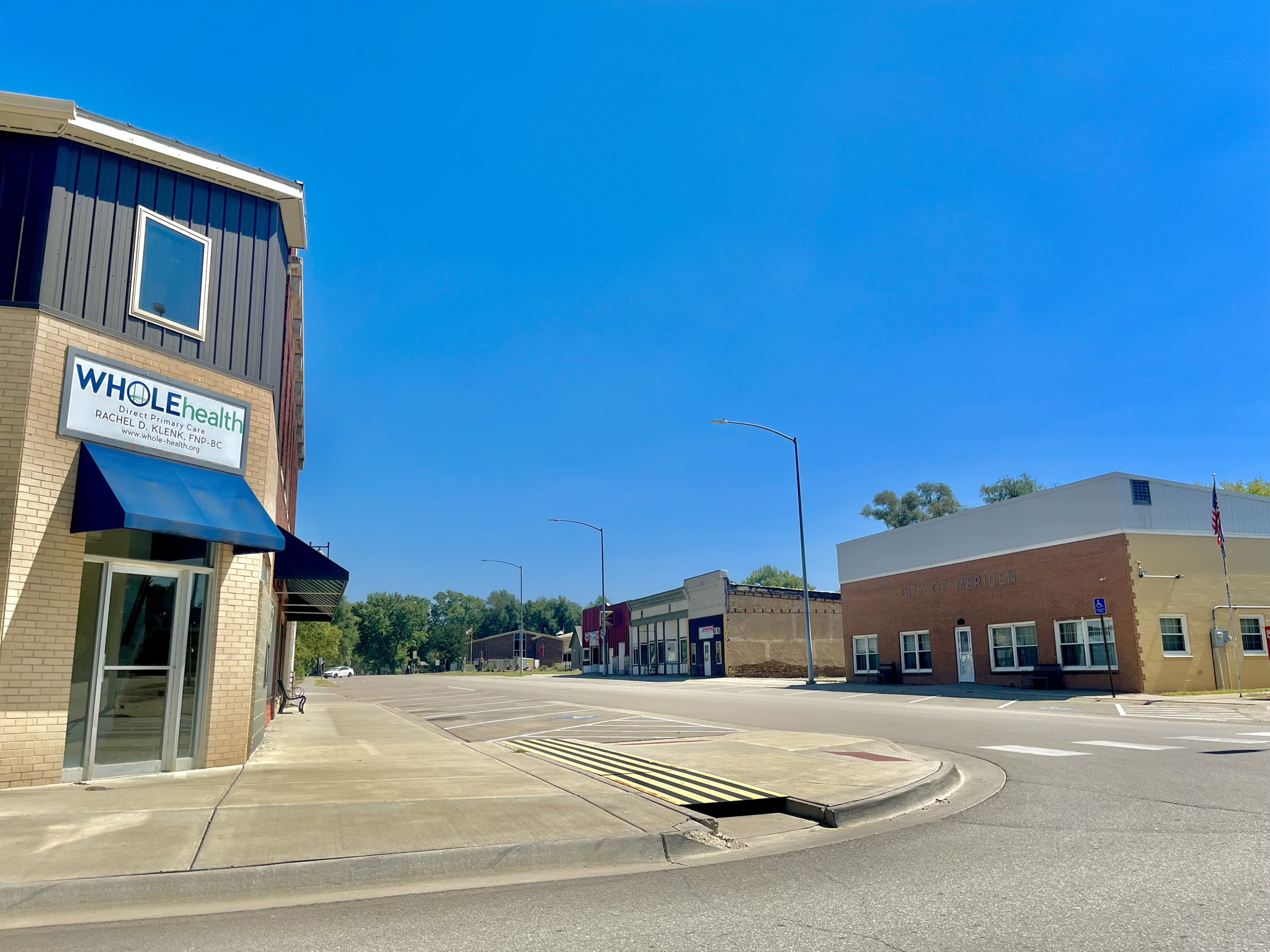
- Downtown Meriden (2023)

- Location within Jefferson County and Kansas

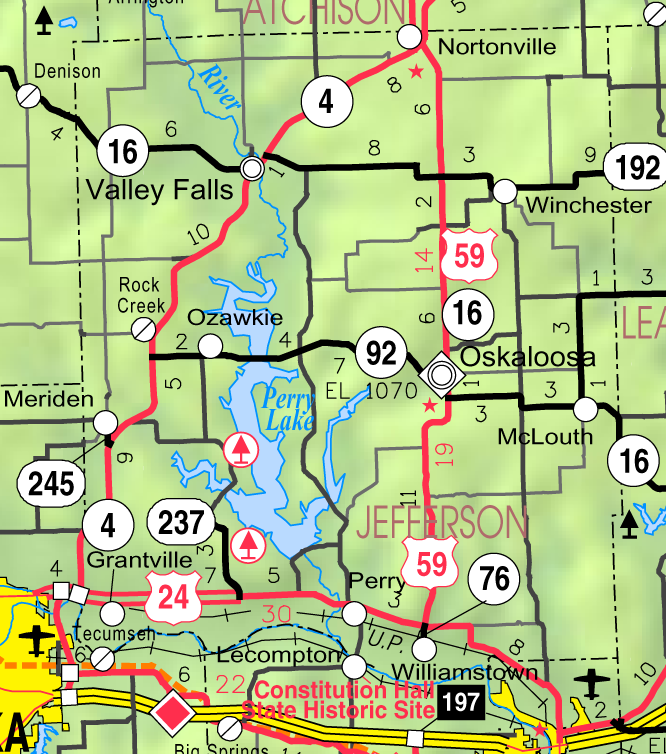
- KDOT map of Jefferson County (legend)
- Coordinates: 39°11.4′N 95°34.1′W
- Country: United States
- State: Kansas
- County: Jefferson
- Founded: 1872
- Incorporated: 1891
- Named for: Meriden, New Hampshire

Area
  - Total: 0.76 sq mi (1.98 km^{2})
  - Land: 0.76 sq mi (1.96 km^{2})
  - Water: 0.0077 sq mi (0.02 km^{2})
- Elevation: 974 ft (297 m)

Population (2020)
  - Total: 744
  - Density: 983/sq mi (380/km^{2})
- Time zone: UTC-6 (CST)
  - Summer (DST): UTC-5 (CDT)
- ZIP Code: 66512
- Area code: 785
- FIPS code: 20-45950
- GNIS ID: 478474
- Website: meridenks.com

Meriden is a city in Jefferson County, Kansas, United States. As of the 2020 census, the population of the city was 744.

== History ==
Meriden was founded in 1872. It was named by a pioneer settler for his former hometown of Meriden, New Hampshire.

Several streets in Meriden are named after early settlers. Owens Street is named after Albert Owens, whom owned the land that Meriden was originally platted on in 1872. Dawson Street is named after Dr. A. Dawson, who was the first to build a dwelling in Meriden.

The Atchison, Topeka and Santa Fe Railroad originally went through the town. A depot was built in 1873. The railroad officially ceased operations on December 31, 1996. Today, there are little remnants left of the railroad line besides a few old train bridges on private property in the surrounding area.

== Geography ==
Meriden is located at 39°11.4′N 95°34.1′W (39.1890, -95.5684). According to the United States Census Bureau, the city has a total area of 0.79 square miles (2.05 km^{2}), of which 0.78 square miles (2.02 km^{2}) is land and 0.01 square miles (0.03 km^{2}) is water.

== Demographics ==
Historical population
Census	Pop.	Note	%±
1880	103		—
1900	433		—
1910	467		7.9%
1920	422		−9.6%
1930	390		−7.6%
1940	421		7.9%
1950	378		−10.2%
1960	402		6.3%
1970	472		17.4%
1980	707		49.8%
1990	622		−12.0%
2000	706		13.5%
2010	813		15.2%
2020	744		−8.5%
U.S. Decennial Census

Meriden is part of the Topeka, Kansas Metropolitan Statistical Area.

=== 2020 census ===
The 2020 United States census counted 744 people, 298 households, and 190 families in Meriden. The population density was 984.1 per square mile (380.0/km^{2}). There were 333 housing units at an average density of 440.5 per square mile (170.1/km^{2}). The racial makeup was 89.52% (666) white or European American (86.83% non-Hispanic white), 0.81% (6) black or African-American, 2.42% (18) Native American or Alaska Native, 0.0% (0) Asian, 0.0% (0) Pacific Islander or Native Hawaiian, 0.81% (6) from other races, and 6.45% (48) from two or more races. Hispanic or Latino of any race was 4.44% (33) of the population.

Of the 298 households, 36.2% had children under the age of 18; 41.6% were married couples living together; 28.2% had a female householder with no spouse or partner present. 29.2% of households consisted of individuals and 12.8% had someone living alone who was 65 years of age or older. The average household size was 2.5 and the average family size was 2.8. The percent of those with a bachelor's degree or higher was estimated to be 10.5% of the population.

26.1% of the population was under the age of 18, 6.9% from 18 to 24, 27.8% from 25 to 44, 25.0% from 45 to 64, and 14.2% who were 65 years of age or older. The median age was 37.6 years. For every 100 females, there were 97.3 males. For every 100 females ages 18 and older, there were 105.2 males.

The 2016–2020 5-year American Community Survey estimates show that the median household income was $61,168 (with a margin of error of +/- $5,081) and the median family income was $62,083 (+/- $8,995). Males had a median income of $40,682 (+/- $9,759) versus $24,886 (+/- $12,192) for females. The median income for those above 16 years old was $34,286 (+/- $4,345). Approximately, 7.5% of families and 8.6% of the population were below the poverty line, including 12.3% of those under the age of 18 and 8.9% of those ages 65 or over.

=== 2010 census ===
As of the census of 2010, there were 813 people, 315 households, and 215 families living in the city. The population density was 1,042.3 inhabitants per square mile (402.4/km^{2}). There were 336 housing units at an average density of 430.8 per square mile (166.3/km^{2}). The racial makeup of the city was 96.8% White, 1.4% Native American, 0.2% Asian, and 1.6% from two or more races. Hispanic or Latino of any race were 2.2% of the population.

There were 315 households, of which 43.2% had children under the age of 18 living with them, 43.5% were married couples living together, 15.2% had a female householder with no husband present, 9.5% had a male householder with no wife present, and 31.7% were non-families. 25.7% of all households were made up of individuals, and 9.2% had someone living alone who was 65 years of age or older. The average household size was 2.58 and the average family size was 3.12.

The median age in the city was 33.5 years. 30.3% of residents were under the age of 18; 9.5% were between the ages of 18 and 24; 26.8% were from 25 to 44; 25.3% were from 45 to 64; and 8.2% were 65 years of age or older. The gender makeup of the city was 51.2% male and 48.8% female.

=== 2000 census ===
As of the census of 2000, there were 706 people, 260 households, and 198 families living in the city. The population density was 1,986.0 inhabitants per square mile (766.8/km^{2}). There were 279 housing units at an average density of 784.8 per square mile (303.0/km^{2}). The racial makeup of the city was 97.17% White, 0.99% Native American, 0.14% from other races, and 1.70% from two or more races. Hispanic or Latino of any race were 0.99% of the population.

There were 260 households, out of which 45.4% had children under the age of 18 living with them, 54.6% were married couples living together, 16.9% had a female householder with no husband present, and 23.5% were non-families. 20.4% of all households were made up of individuals, and 6.9% had someone living alone who was 65 years of age or older. The average household size was 2.72 and the average family size was 3.14.

In the city, the population was spread out, with 32.4% under the age of 18, 7.8% from 18 to 24, 33.7% from 25 to 44, 16.9% from 45 to 64, and 9.2% who were 65 years of age or older. The median age was 31 years. For every 100 females, there were 101.7 males. For every 100 females age 18 and over, there were 94.7 males.

The median income for a household in the city was $40,221, and the median income for a family was $45,278. Males had a median income of $35,515 versus $25,769 for females. The per capita income for the city was $16,008. About 4.5% of families and 5.9% of the population were below the poverty line, including 7.5% of those under age 18 and 1.8% of those age 65 or over.

== Education ==
The community is served by Jefferson West USD 340 public school district.
