= Puella Dornblaser =

American newspaper editor and temperance activist

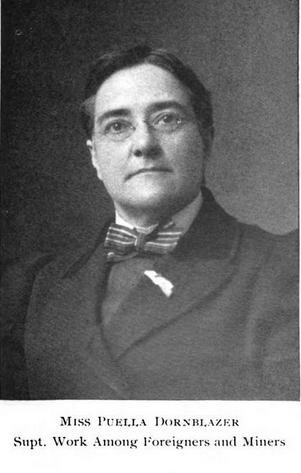
Puella Dornblaser, in an 1899 publication

Puella E. Dornblaser (October 7, 1851 – March 17, 1904) was an American newspaper editor and temperance activist based in Pennsylvania. Her temperance education and missionary work were focused especially in immigrant and mining communities.

== Early life ==
Puella E. Dornblaser was one of eight children born on a farm in Clinton County, Pennsylvania, to Peter Dornblaser and Elizabeth Shaffer Dornblaser. She attended Susquehanna University.

Her older brother Thomas Franklin Dornblaser (1841–1941) was a Civil War veteran and a longtime Lutheran minister in Chicago.

== Career ==
In 1875, she lived in Valley Falls, Kansas with her older sister Amanda J. Townsend, and edited a department of the Oskaloosa Independent. In 1876, she was sworn in as First Assistant Enrolling Secretary of the Kansas House of Representatives.

Back in her home state, Dornblaser became Clinton County president of the Women's Christian Temperance Union (WCTU) in 1886. She was vice-president of the Pennsylvania WCTU for eight years, and served a superintendent of the organization's mission among immigrants and miners. She was president of the Synodical Society of the English Lutheran Church for ten years, president of the Women's Mission Society of Central Pennsylvania, and worked in various capacities with the Eagle's Mere Chautauqua Society. She was also a vice president of the Ladies' Aid Society of Lock Haven Hospital. She was in charge of the Girls' Industrial School at Williamsport, and superintendent of the Board of Charities in that city. She sometimes used the pen name "Maud Muller" in newspaper writings.

A contemporary observer described Dornblaser as "universally acknowledged as the wittiest and most original woman in the W. C. T. U. ... being eminently fitted for this work by her bright, vivacious manner."

== Personal life ==
Puella E. Dornblaser died in 1904, aged 52 years, after several months' illness. Her remains were buried in a Dornblaser family plot at St. Paul's Lutheran Church Cemetery in Clinton County, Pennsylvania.

Dornblaser Field in Missoula, Montana is named for her nephew Paul Logan Dornblaser (1887–1918), who died in World War I and was awarded posthumous Silver Stars for valor.
