= USS Charles E. Brannon =

American Navy destroyer escort

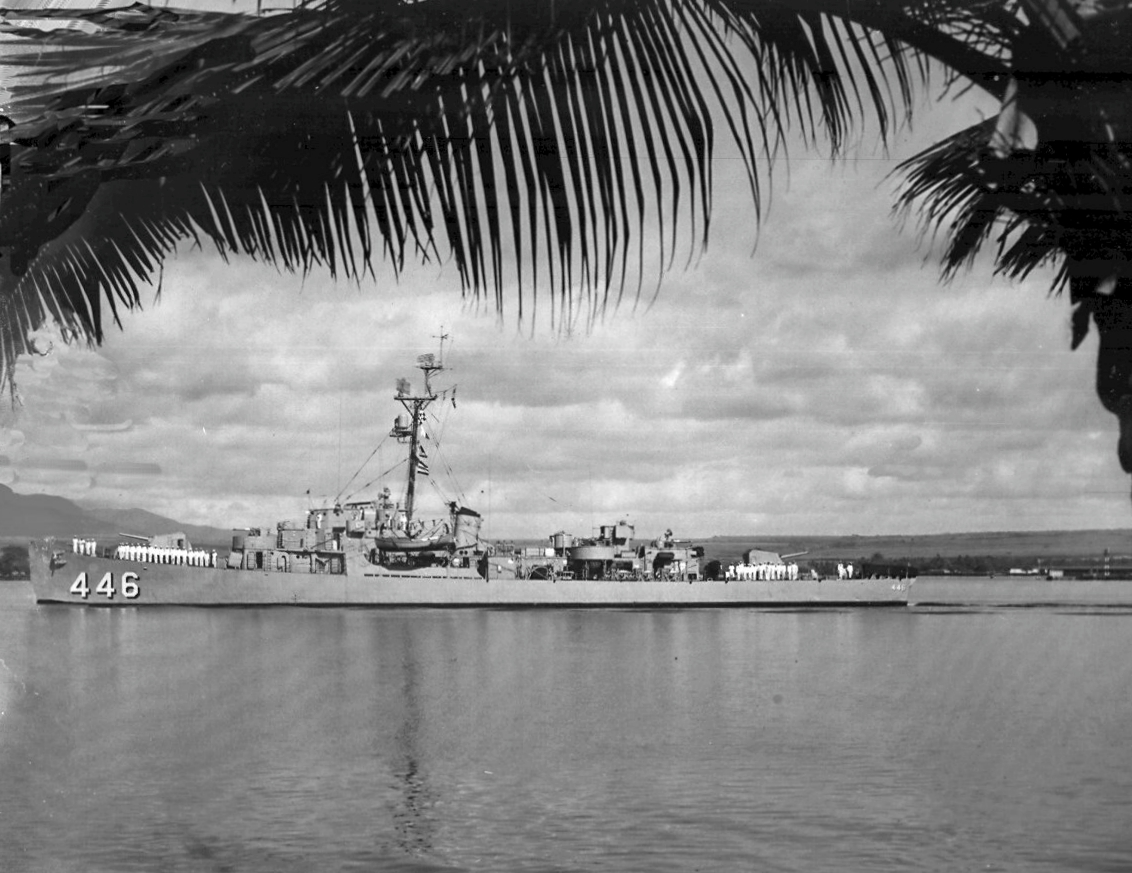

History

United States
- Laid down: 13 January 1944
- Launched: 23 April 1944
- Commissioned: 1 November 1944
- Decommissioned: 21 May 1946
- In service: August 1946
- Out of service: 23 September 1968
- Stricken: 23 September 1968
- Fate: Sold for scrapping 27 October 1969
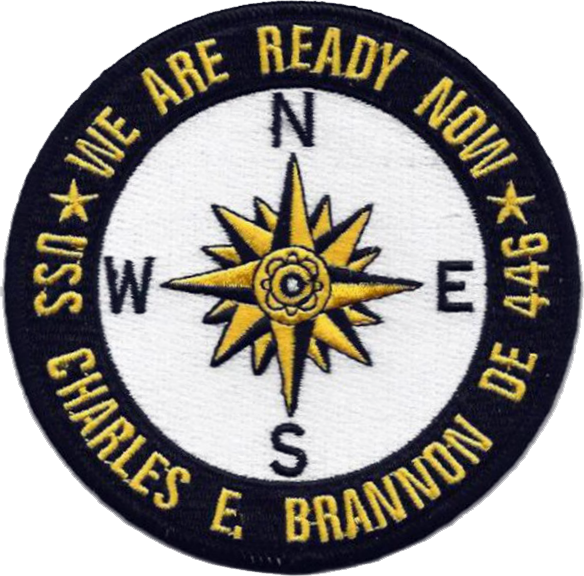
- Badge

General characteristics
- Displacement: 1,350 long tons (1,372 t)
- Length: 306 ft (93 m) (oa)
- Beam: 36 ft 10 in (11.23 m)
- Draught: 13 ft 4 in (4.06 m) (max)
- Propulsion: 2 boilers, 2 geared steam turbines, 12,000 shp, 2 screws
- Speed: 24 knots (44 km/h)
- Range: 6,000 nm (11,112 km) @ 12 knots (22 km/h)
- Complement: 14 officers, 201 enlisted
- Armament: 2 × 5"/38 guns, 4 (2×2) 40 mm anti-aircraft (AA) guns, 10 × 20 mm AA guns, 3 × 21-inch (533 mm) torpedo tubes, 1 × Hedgehog, 8 × depth charge throwers, 2 × depth charge tracks

USS Charles E. Brannon (DE-446) was a John C. Butler-class destroyer escort in service with the United States Navy from 1944 to 1968. She was sold for scrapping in 1969.

== Namesake ==
Charles E. Brannon was born on 2 August 1919 in Montgomery, Alabama. He enlisted in the United States Naval Reserve on 14 April 1941 for aviation training. Ensign Brannon reported for duty in Torpedo Squadron 8 on the aircraft carrier USS Hornet on 3 February 1942. He was killed in action on 4 June 1942 during the Battle of Midway. He was posthumously awarded the Navy Cross for pressing home an attack against an Imperial Japanese Navy carrier.

== History ==
Charles E. Brannon was launched 23 April 1944 by Federal Shipbuilding Co., Newark, New Jersey; sponsored by Second Lieutenant D. Brannon, WAG; and commissioned 1 November 1944.

=== Pacific War ===
Putting out from New York 27 January 1945, Charles E. Brannon escorted cargo ships by way of the Panama Canal, and the Galapagos and Society Islands to Manus, arriving 15 March. Routed on to San Pedro Bay, Philippine Islands, she began the important task of guarding inter-island convoys. Late in April, she sailed in the screen of the assault forces bound for Tarakan, Borneo, off which she lay from 1 to 8 May, covering the landings and giving call fire support. Her effective gunfire won many compliments from the troops whose advance was thereby expedited. Charles E. Brannon gave similar support during the assault on Brunei Bay which began 10 June.

From the beginning of July through mid-September 1945, Charles E. Brannon escorted convoys sailing from the Philippines to Okinawa, then participated in the occupation of China operating between Okinawa and Hong Kong. She returned to San Francisco, California, 1 February and on 21 May 1946 was placed out of commission in reserve at San Diego, California.

=== Training ship ===
From August 1946 into 1960, Charles E. Brannon was assigned to the reserve training program. In cruises along the U.S. west coast over weekends and in more extended periods, active reservists manned her in refresher training. From 21 November 1950 to 18 June 1960, Charles E. Brannon performed this service in commissioned status, and since the latter date has been in service under an officer-in-charge, with a reserve officer in command when she put to sea with her reserve training group. On 23 September 1968, she was finally taken out of service and was struck from the Navy list. On 27 October 1969, she was sold for scrapping.

== Military awards ==
Charles E. Brannon received one battle star for World War II service.
