= Valley Falls, Kansas =

- City
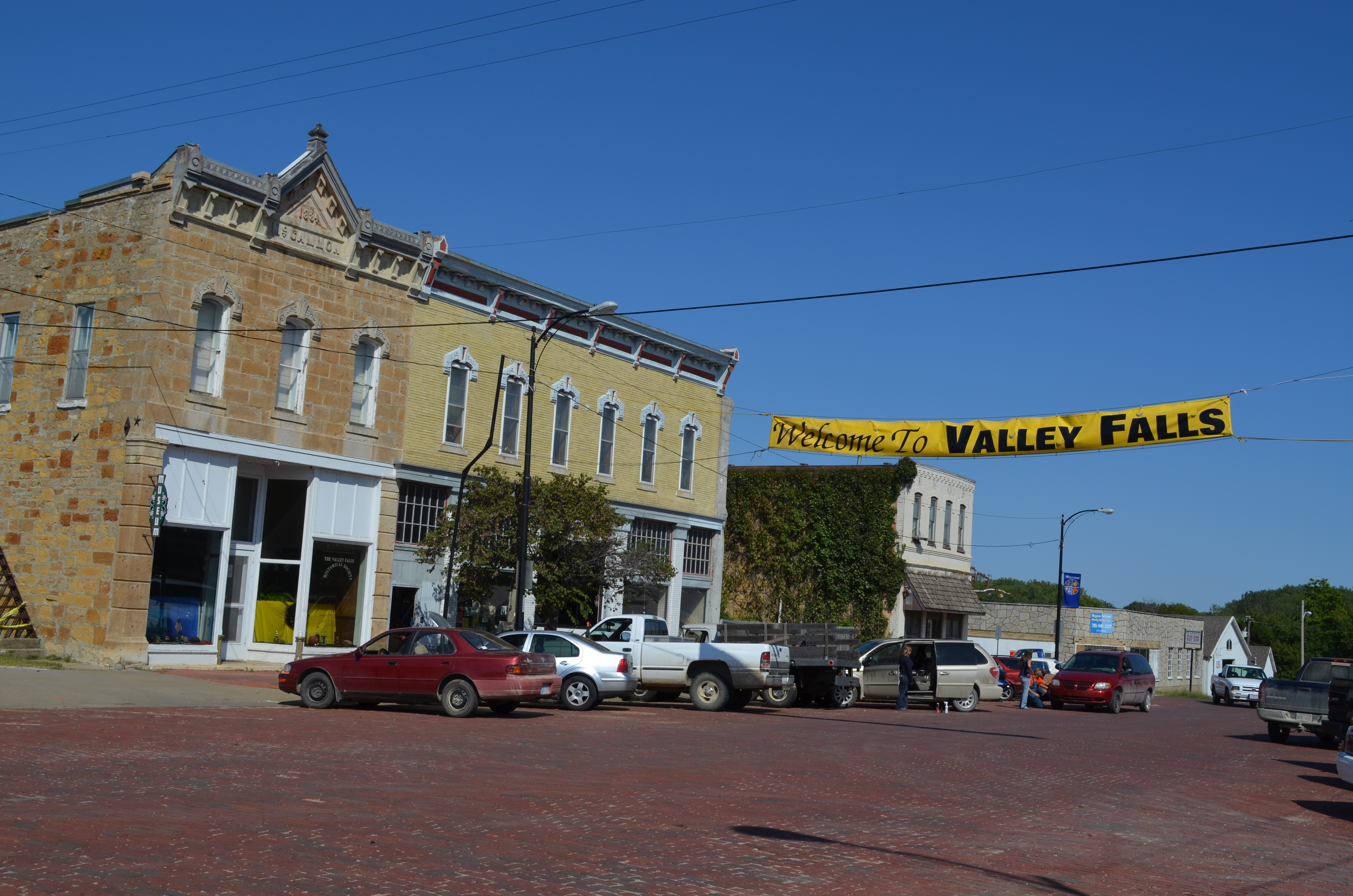
- Downtown Valley Falls (2014)

- Location within Jefferson County and Kansas

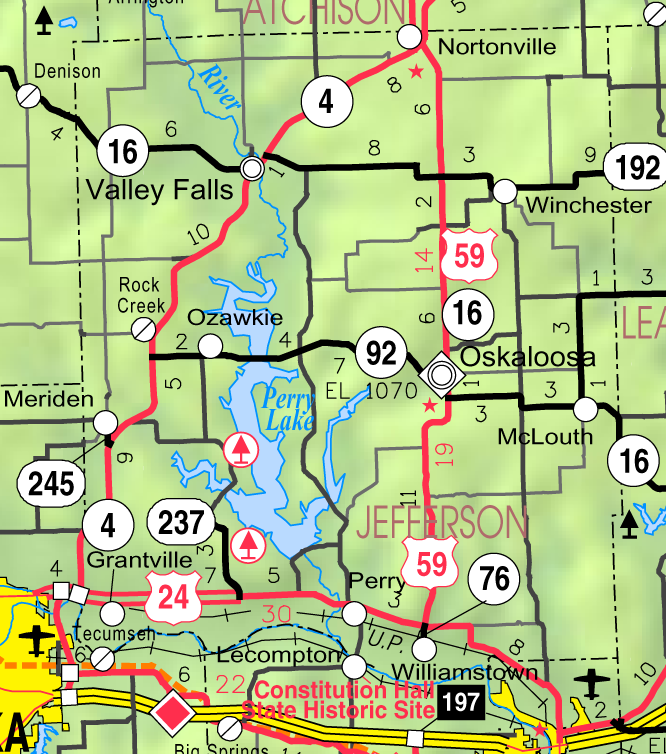
- KDOT map of Jefferson County (legend)
- Coordinates: 39°20′35″N 95°27′38″W
- Country: United States
- State: Kansas
- County: Jefferson
- Founded: 1854
- Platted: 1855
- Incorporated: 1869

Area
  - Total: 0.71 sq mi (1.84 km^{2})
  - Land: 0.70 sq mi (1.82 km^{2})
  - Water: 0.0039 sq mi (0.01 km^{2})
- Elevation: 942 ft (287 m)

Population (2020)
  - Total: 1,092
  - Density: 1,550/sq mi (600/km^{2})
- Time zone: UTC-6 (CST)
  - Summer (DST): UTC-5 (CDT)
- ZIP Code: 66088
- Area code: 785
- FIPS code: 20-73300
- GNIS ID: 478332
- Website: valleyfalls.org

Valley Falls is a city in Jefferson County, Kansas, United States. As of the 2020 census, the population of the city was 1,092.

== History ==
Valley Falls was originally called Grasshopper Falls, from the falls in the Grasshopper River (now known as the Delaware River). The first settlement was made there in 1854, and the town was platted in 1855. Many of the town's streets were named after women pioneer settlers.

== Geography ==
Valley Falls is located at 39°20′35″N 95°27′38″W. According to the United States Census Bureau, the city has a total area of 0.78 square miles (2.02 km^{2}), of which 0.77 square miles (1.99 km^{2}) is land and 0.01 square miles (0.03 km^{2}) is water.

=== Climate ===
The climate in this area is characterized by hot, humid summers and generally mild to cool winters. According to the Köppen Climate Classification system, Valley Falls has a humid subtropical climate, abbreviated "Cfa" on climate maps.

== Demographics ==
Historical population
Census	Pop.	Note	%±
1860	202		—
1870	603		198.5%
1880	1,016		68.5%
1890	1,180		16.1%
1900	1,078		−8.6%
1910	1,129		4.7%
1920	1,218		7.9%
1930	1,238		1.6%
1940	1,241		0.2%
1950	1,139		−8.2%
1960	1,193		4.7%
1970	1,169		−2.0%
1980	1,189		1.7%
1990	1,253		5.4%
2000	1,254		0.1%
2010	1,192		−4.9%
2020	1,092		−8.4%
U.S. Decennial Census

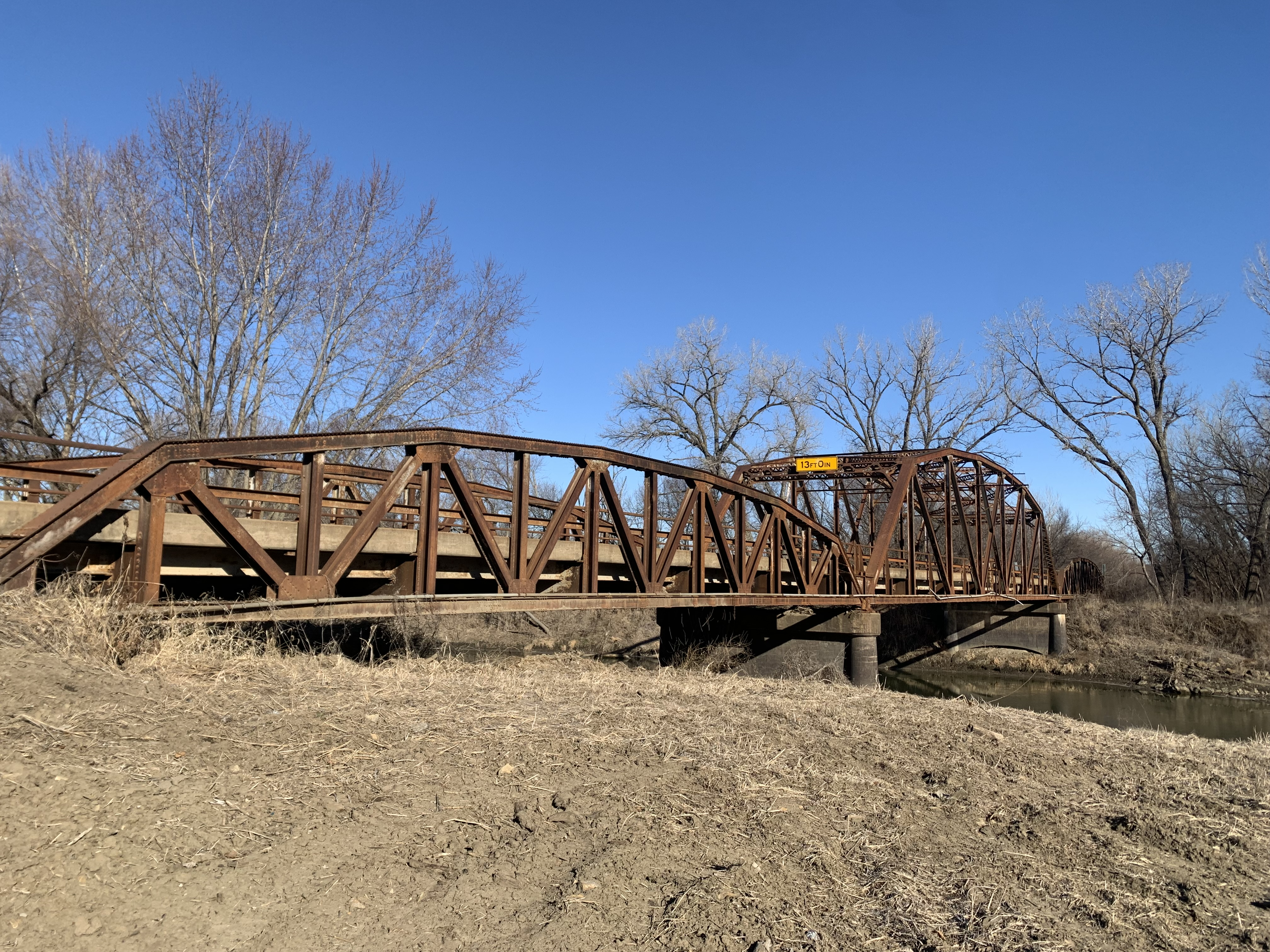
Delaware River Composite Truss Bridge in Valley Falls (2026)

Valley Falls is part of the Topeka, Kansas Metropolitan Statistical Area.

=== 2010 census ===
As of the census of 2010, there were 1,192 people, 444 households, and 290 families residing in the city. The population density was 1,548.1 inhabitants per square mile (597.7/km^{2}). There were 518 housing units at an average density of 672.7 per square mile (259.7/km^{2}). The racial makeup of the city was 96.2% White, 2.1% African American, 1.0% Native American, 0.1% Asian, 0.1% from other races, and 0.5% from two or more races. Hispanic or Latino of any race were 1.8% of the population.

There were 444 households, of which 36.3% had children under the age of 18 living with them, 50.7% were married couples living together, 7.7% had a female householder with no husband present, 7.0% had a male householder with no wife present, and 34.7% were non-families. 31.1% of all households were made up of individuals, and 16.9% had someone living alone who was 65 years of age or older. The average household size was 2.44 and the average family size was 3.04.

The median age in the city was 40.8 years. 26.1% of residents were under the age of 18; 6.3% were between the ages of 18 and 24; 24.6% were from 25 to 44; 24.6% were from 45 to 64; and 18.5% were 65 years of age or older. The gender makeup of the city was 46.5% male and 53.5% female.

=== 2000 census ===
As of the census of 2000, there were 1,254 people, 485 households, and 297 families residing in the city. The population density was 1,682.6 inhabitants per square mile (649.7/km^{2}). There were 521 housing units at an average density of 699.1 per square mile (269.9/km^{2}). The racial makeup of the city was 96.89% White, 0.72% African American, 1.12% Native American, 0.40% Asian, 0.16% from other races, and 0.72% from two or more races. Hispanic or Latino of any race were 0.64% of the population.

There were 485 households, out of which 33.2% had children under the age of 18 living with them, 48.7% were married couples living together, 8.7% had a female householder with no husband present, and 38.6% were non-families. 34.6% of all households were made up of individuals, and 21.9% had someone living alone who was 65 years of age or older. The average household size was 2.44 and the average family size was 3.21.

In the city, the population was spread out, with 28.0% under the age of 18, 8.3% from 18 to 24, 25.6% from 25 to 44, 19.5% from 45 to 64, and 18.7% who were 65 years of age or older. The median age was 37 years. For every 100 females, there were 98.4 males. For every 100 females age 18 and over, there were 92.9 males.

The median income for a household in the city was $34,018, and the median income for a family was $41,500. Males had a median income of $28,000 versus $21,771 for females. The per capita income for the city was $15,626. About 5.1% of families and 7.9% of the population were below the poverty line, including 5.2% of those under age 18 and 19.6% of those age 65 or over.

== Government ==
Valley Falls is governed by a mayor/council form of government. There are five council members. The day-to-day business of the city is conducted by the city administrator, and a part-time city clerk, paid employees of the city.

== Education ==
The community is served by Valley Falls USD 338 public school district. It has one local grade school serving grades PreK-8 and one local high school serving grades 9-12. The local sports teams are known as the Dragons and their school colors are black and gold.

== Notable people ==
- Puella Dornblaser, temperance activist, lived in Valley Falls and edited at a newspaper in Oskaloosa
- Moses Harman, American schoolteacher and publisher of the anarchist periodical Lucifer, the Light-Bearer. The periodical began as The Kansas Liberal and was published in Valley Falls.
- Lillian Harman, American sex radical feminist and editor. Famous for her "free marriage" for which she was prosecuted under the Kansas Marriage Act of 1867. "In a ceremony in Valley Falls, Kansas, on September 19, 1886, she joined Edwin Cox Walker, thirty-seven, in an "autonomistic marriage" that repudiated Christian and governmental ideas of marriage."
- Fred Marsh, professional baseball player, born in Valley Falls in 1924.
- King O'Malley, member of the Australian House of Representatives in the early 20th century, although he also claimed he was born in Quebec, Canada
- George Stafford, former chairman for the Interstate Commerce Commission, was born and schooled in Valley Falls

== See also ==
- Great Flood of 1951
