= List of rivers of Kansas =

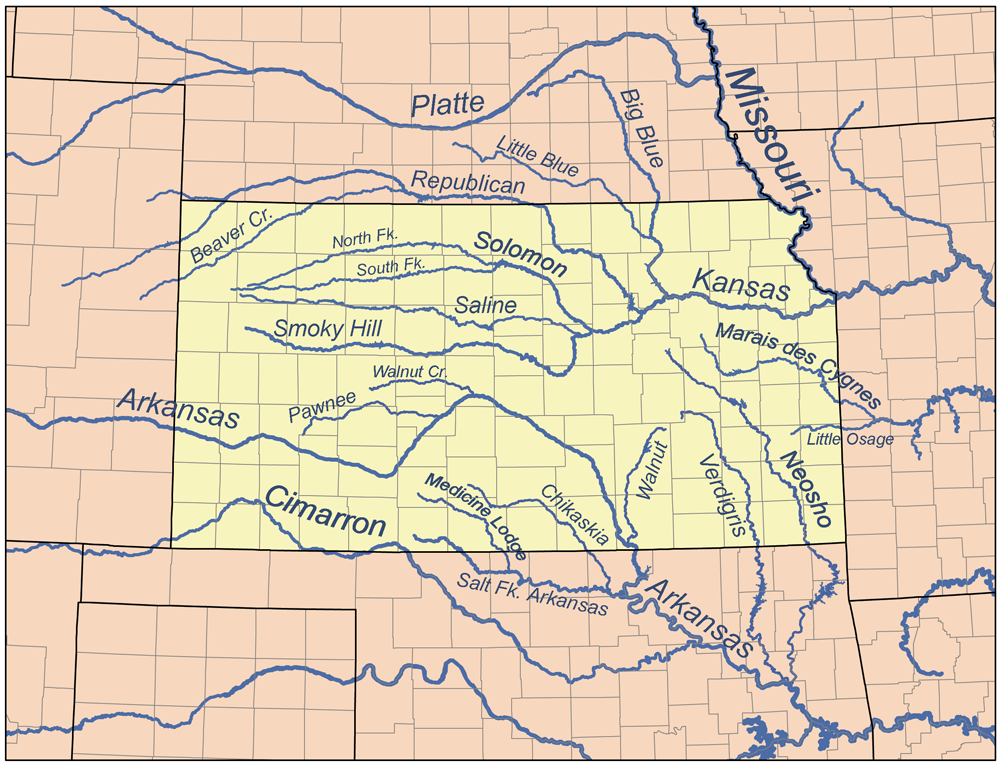
Map of principal rivers in Kansas

This is a list of rivers in Kansas (U.S. state).

== By drainage basin ==
This list is arranged by drainage basin, with respective tributaries indented under each larger stream's name.

=== Mississippi River Basin ===
==== Arkansas River Basin ====
- Arkansas River
  - Neosho River
    - Spring River
      - Shoal Creek
    - Cottonwood River
  - Verdigris River
    - Caney River
    - Elk River
    - Fall River
  - Cimarron River
    - North Fork Cimarron River
  - Salt Fork Arkansas River
    - Chikaskia River
    - Medicine Lodge River
  - Grouse Creek
  - Walnut River
    - Little Walnut River
    - Whitewater River
  - Ninnescah River
    - North Fork Ninnescah River
    - South Fork Ninnescah River
  - Little Arkansas River
  - Cow Creek
  - Rattlesnake Creek
  - Walnut Creek
  - Pawnee River
    - Buckner Creek
  - Bear Creek

==== Missouri River Basin ====
- Missouri River
  - Osage River
    - Little Osage River
      - Marmaton River
    - Marais des Cygnes River
  - Blue River
    - Brush Creek
  - Kansas River
    - Stranger Creek
    - Wakarusa River
    - Delaware River
    - Mission Creek
    - Big Blue River
      - Black Vermillion River
      - Little Blue River
      - Indian Creek
    - Republican River
      - Buffalo Creek
      - White Rock Creek
      - Prairie Dog Creek
      - Sappa Creek
        - Beaver Creek
          - Little Beaver Creek
      - South Fork Republican River
      - Arikaree River
    - Smoky Hill River
      - Solomon River
        - North Fork Solomon River
        - South Fork Solomon River
      - Saline River
      - Big Creek
      - Hackberry Creek
      - Ladder Creek
      - North Fork Smoky Hill River
  - Wolf River
  - Big Nemaha River

== Alphabetically ==
- Arikaree River
- Arkansas River
- Beaver Creek
- Big Blue River
- Big Creek
- Big Nemaha River
- Black Vermillion River
- Blue River
- Brush Creek
- Buckner Creek
- Buffalo Creek
- Caney River
- Chikaskia River
- Cimarron River
- Cottonwood River
- Cow Creek
- Delaware River
- Elk River
- Fall River
- Grouse Creek
- Hackberry Creek
- Kansas River
- Ladder Creek
- Little Arkansas River
- Little Beaver Creek
- Little Blue River
- Little Osage River
- Little Walnut River
- Marais des Cygnes River
- Marmaton River
- Medicine Lodge River
- Mission Creek
- Missouri River
- Neosho River
- Ninnescah River
- North Fork Ninnescah River
- North Fork Smoky Hill River
- North Fork Solomon River
- Pawnee River
- Prairie Dog Creek
- Rattlesnake Creek
- Republican River
- Saline River
- Salt Fork Arkansas River
- Sappa Creek
- Shoal Creek
- Smoky Hill River
- Solomon River
- South Fork Ninnescah River
- South Fork Republican River
- South Fork Solomon River
- Spring River
- Stranger Creek
- Verdigris River
- Wakarusa River
- Walnut Creek
- Walnut River
- White Rock Creek
- Whitewater River
- Wolf River

== By size ==
This table lists rivers in Kansas with a mean flow rate in cubic feet of water per second (cfs) of more than 100 cfs. The period of record for most rivers listed is more than 50 years up to and including the year 2013. One cubic foot equals .0283 cubic meters. The measurements of daily, monthly, and annual mean flow rates may vary substantially from the long-term mean flow rate listed.

| River | Cubic feet per second flow | Location of monitoring station |
|---|---|---|
| Missouri River | 54,280 | Near Kansas City |
| Kansas (Kaw) River | 7,464 | Near junction with Missouri River |
| Verdigris River | 3,260 | Near Coffeyville |
| Neosho (Grand) River | 2,924 | Near Parsons |
| Arkansas River | 2,881 | Near Oklahoma state line |
| Big Blue River | 2,325 | Near Manhattan |
| Marais des Cygnes River | 2,219 | Near Missouri state line |
| Smoky Hill River | 1,540 | Near Enterprise |
| Walnut River | 924 | Near Winfield |
| Cottonwood River | 879 | Near Plymouth |
| Republican River | 839 | Near Junction City |
| Delaware River | 682 | Near Perry |
| Little Blue River | 672 | Near Barnes |
| Solomon River | 550 | Near Niles |
| Fall River | 536 | Near Fredonia |
| Ninnescah River | 528 | Near Peck |
| Little Arkansas River | 315 | Valley Center |
| Caney River | 288 | Near Elgin |
| Chikaskia River | 264 | Near Corbin |
| Stranger Creek | 247 | Near Tonganoxie |
| Wakarusa River | 220 | Near Lawrence |
| Saline River | 214 | Near Tescott |
| Whitewater River | 210 | Near Towanda |
| South Fork Ninnescah River | 210 | Near Murdock |
| Mill Creek | 189 | Near Paxico |
| Lightning Creek | 171 | Near McCune |
| Black Vermillion River | 169 | Near Frankfort |
| Elk River | 161 | Near Elk Falls |
| Soldier Creek | 158 | Near Topeka |
| Medicine Lodge River | 151 | Near Kiowa |
| Turkey Creek (Seneca County) | 126 | Near Seneca |
| North Fork Solomon River | 116 | Near Portis |
| South Fork Solomon River | 105 | Near Osborne |
| Indian Creek | 102 | Near Leawood |

== See also ==
- List of rivers in the United States
