= Perry State Park =

State park in Kansas, United States

- Location within Kansas Location within the United States
- Interactive map of Perry State Park
- Location: Jefferson County, Kansas, United States
- Coordinates: 39°08′26″N 95°29′17″W
- Area: 1,597 acres (646 ha)
- Elevation: 892 ft (272 m)
- Established: 1967
- Administrator: Kansas Department of Wildlife and Parks
- Visitors: 166,293 (in 2022)
- Website: Official website
- Kansas State Parks

Perry State Park is a state park located in Jefferson County, near Ozawkie, Kansas, United States, 20 miles (32 km) northeast of Topeka. The state park features camping, a beach, hiking, and a fishing and boating area. Perry State Park was authorized by the state legislature in 1967 and brought to fruition in 1968 through an agreement between the Kansas Parks and Resources and the U.S. Army Corps of Engineers.

== See also ==
- List of lakes, reservoirs, and dams in Kansas
- List of rivers of Kansas
