= Ozawkie, Kansas =

- City
- Location within Jefferson County and Kansas

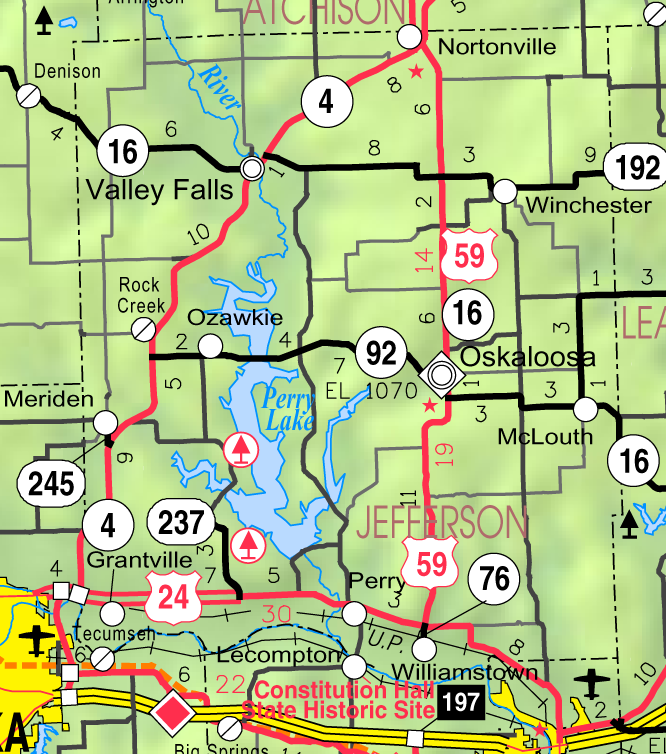
- KDOT map of Jefferson County (legend)
- Coordinates: 39°14′00″N 95°27′57″W
- Country: United States
- State: Kansas
- County: Jefferson
- Incorporated: 1967

Area
  - Total: 0.30 sq mi (0.77 km^{2})
  - Land: 0.30 sq mi (0.77 km^{2})
  - Water: 0 sq mi (0.00 km^{2})
- Elevation: 997 ft (304 m)

Population (2020)
  - Total: 638
  - Density: 2,100/sq mi (830/km^{2})
- Time zone: UTC-6 (CST)
  - Summer (DST): UTC-5 (CDT)
- ZIP Code: 66070
- Area code: 785
- FIPS code: 20-53925
- GNIS ID: 478489
- Website: ozawkie.org

Ozawkie is a city in Jefferson County, Kansas, United States. As of the 2020 census, the population of the city was 638. Located adjacent to Perry Lake, Ozawkie formerly existed in a different location but was relocated without the aid of government funding prior to the reservoir's construction.

== History ==
The community was originally named Osawkee and became Jefferson County's original county seat in 1855. The word Ozawkie is derived from the Sauk or Saukee Indians.

In 1930, there were rumors the US Army Corps of Engineers building a dam and relocation would be required. However, it was only in 1954 that the Perry Dam Project was approved. Since Ozawkie was not incorporated, the US Government would not relocate it. Citizens came together to form a non-profit organization to help move Ozawkie. In 1966, Ozawkie was relocated to higher ground west of the original town site and a water tower, school and 26 homes were built.

In 1967, the relocated Ozawkie was incorporated.

== Geography ==
Ozawkie is located at 39°14′00″N 95°27′57″W (39.233201, -95.465709). According to the United States Census Bureau, the city has a total area of 0.38 square miles (0.98 km^{2}), all land.

== Demographics ==
Historical population
Census	Pop.	Note	%±
1970	137		—
1980	472		244.5%
1990	403		−14.6%
2000	552		37.0%
2010	645		16.8%
2020	638		−1.1%
U.S. Decennial Census

Ozawkie is part of the Topeka, Kansas Metropolitan Statistical Area.

=== 2020 census ===
The 2020 United States census counted 638 people, 238 households, and 186 families in Ozawkie. The population density was 2,148.1 per square mile (829.4/km^{2}). There were 251 housing units at an average density of 845.1 per square mile (326.3/km^{2}). The racial makeup was 87.15% (556) white or European American (86.83% non-Hispanic white), 1.57% (10) black or African-American, 1.57% (10) Native American or Alaska Native, 0.16% (1) Asian, 1.88% (12) Pacific Islander or Native Hawaiian, 0.16% (1) from other races, and 7.52% (48) from two or more races. Hispanic or Latino of any race was 2.04% (13) of the population.

Of the 238 households, 37.4% had children under the age of 18; 63.0% were married couples living together; 18.5% had a female householder with no spouse or partner present. 18.1% of households consisted of individuals and 8.8% had someone living alone who was 65 years of age or older. The average household size was 2.5 and the average family size was 2.7. The percent of those with a bachelor's degree or higher was estimated to be 25.4% of the population.

27.6% of the population was under the age of 18, 6.3% from 18 to 24, 21.9% from 25 to 44, 24.5% from 45 to 64, and 19.7% who were 65 years of age or older. The median age was 40.5 years. For every 100 females, there were 105.8 males. For every 100 females ages 18 and older, there were 111.9 males.

The 2016–2020 5-year American Community Survey estimates show that the median household income was $83,295 (with a margin of error of +/- $14,572) and the median family income was $88,393 (+/- $12,828). Males had a median income of $59,432 (+/- $10,171) versus $40,000 (+/- $6,820) for females. The median income for those above 16 years old was $44,938 (+/- $10,576). Approximately, 0.0% of families and 0.6% of the population were below the poverty line, including 0.0% of those under the age of 18 and 1.3% of those ages 65 or over.

=== 2010 census ===
As of the census of 2010, there were 645 people, 231 households, and 195 families living in the city. The population density was 1,697.4 inhabitants per square mile (655.4/km^{2}). There were 246 housing units at an average density of 647.4 per square mile (250.0/km^{2}). The racial makeup of the city was 95.5% White, 0.6% African American, 1.4% Native American, 0.3% from other races, and 2.2% from two or more races. Hispanic or Latino of any race were 2.6% of the population.

There were 231 households, of which 39.8% had children under the age of 18 living with them, 70.6% were married couples living together, 10.0% had a female householder with no husband present, 3.9% had a male householder with no wife present, and 15.6% were non-families. 13.0% of all households were made up of individuals, and 6.5% had someone living alone who was 65 years of age or older. The average household size was 2.79 and the average family size was 3.02.

The median age in the city was 37.5 years. 28.7% of residents were under the age of 18; 7% were between the ages of 18 and 24; 21.7% were from 25 to 44; 26.6% were from 45 to 64; and 16% were 65 years of age or older. The gender makeup of the city was 50.4% male and 49.6% female.

=== 2000 census ===
As of the census of 2000, there were 552 people, 202 households, and 167 families living in the city. The population density was 1,797.3 inhabitants per square mile (693.9/km^{2}). There were 216 housing units at an average density of 703.3 per square mile (271.5/km^{2}). The racial makeup of the city was 97.28% White, 0.72% African American, 1.27% Native American, 0.18% Asian, and 0.54% from two or more races. Hispanic or Latino of any race were 0.36% of the population.

There were 202 households, out of which 36.1% had children under the age of 18 living with them, 77.2% were married couples living together, 5.0% had a female householder with no husband present, and 17.3% were non-families. 13.9% of all households were made up of individuals, and 7.9% had someone living alone who was 65 years of age or older. The average household size was 2.73 and the average family size was 3.03.

In the city, the population was spread out, with 27.4% under the age of 18, 4.3% from 18 to 24, 25.4% from 25 to 44, 29.3% from 45 to 64, and 13.6% who were 65 years of age or older. The median age was 40 years. For every 100 females, there were 95.7 males. For every 100 females age 18 and over, there were 92.8 males.

The median income for a household in the city was $62,969, and the median income for a family was $67,292. Males had a median income of $42,308 versus $27,375 for females. The per capita income for the city was $21,857. About 1.1% of families and 2.3% of the population were below the poverty line, including none of those under the age of eighteen or sixty-five or over.

== Education ==
The community is served by Jefferson West USD 340 public school district.

== See also ==
- Perry Lake and Perry State Park
- Great Flood of 1951
