= National Register of Historic Places listings in Leavenworth County, Kansas =

Location of Leavenworth County in Kansas

This is a list of the National Register of Historic Places listings in Leavenworth County, Kansas. This is intended to be a complete list of the properties and districts on the National Register of Historic Places in Leavenworth County, Kansas, United States. The locations of National Register properties and districts for which the latitude and longitude coordinates are included below, may be seen in a map.

There are 47 properties and districts listed on the National Register in the county, including 2 National Historic Landmarks. Another property was once listed but has been removed.

This National Park Service list is complete through NPS recent listings posted December 12, 2025.

== Current listings ==
	Name on the Register	Image	Date listed	Location	City or town	Description
1	Abernathy Furniture Company Factory	Abernathy Furniture Company Factory	October 12, 2004 (#04001142)	200-210 Seneca St.; also 100 N. 2nd St. 39°19′11″N 94°54′35″W	Leavenworth	Second set of addresses represent a boundary increase of April 5, 2016
2	A.J. Angell House	A.J. Angell House	November 17, 1977 (#77000586)	714 S. Broadway; 39°18′38″N 94°55′15″W	Leavenworth	
3	Arch Street Historic District	Arch Street Historic District	July 3, 2002 (#02000718)	Roughly bounded by Arch, Pine, S. Second and S. Third Sts. 39°18′34″N 94°54′33″W	Leavenworth	
4	Atchison, Topeka and Santa Fe Railroad Passenger Depot	Atchison, Topeka and Santa Fe Railroad Passenger Depot	June 11, 1986 (#86001321)	781 Shawnee St. 39°19′00″N 94°55′28″W	Leavenworth	
5	AXA Building	AXA Building	March 17, 1972 (#72000509)	205 S. 5th St. 39°19′04″N 94°54′54″W	Leavenworth	Late Victorian style commercial building, built in 1905.
6	Begley Bridge	Begley Bridge	May 9, 2003 (#03000373)	Two unnamed farm roads flanking Stranger Creek, 1.1 miles west of junction with 227th St. and Roe Rd., 1.75 miles northwest of Millwood; 39°24′39″N 95°07′25″W	Millwood	
7	David J. Brewer House	David J. Brewer House	February 23, 1972 (#72000508)	403 5th Ave. 39°18′22″N 94°55′02″W	Leavenworth	
8	Nathaniel H. Burt House	Nathaniel H. Burt House	October 27, 1987 (#87001105)	1200 5th Ave. 39°18′22″N 94°55′05″W	Leavenworth	
9	Caenen Site		September 6, 2005 (#05000973)	Address restricted	Tonganoxie	
10	Edward Carroll House	Edward Carroll House	October 2, 1986 (#86002806)	1128 5th Ave. 39°18′24″N 94°55′05″W	Leavenworth	
11	Delaware Cemetery		February 3, 2020 (#100004927)	10388 222nd St. 38°57′49″N 95°05′37″W	Linwood	
12	Evans Site		October 28, 2004 (#04001190)	Address restricted	Tonganoxie	
13	First Presbyterian Church, Leavenworth	First Presbyterian Church, Leavenworth	January 11, 2006 (#05001515)	407 Walnut St. 39°18′49″N 94°54′47″W	Leavenworth	
14	Fort Leavenworth	Fort Leavenworth	October 15, 1966 (#66000346)	Fort Leavenworth Military Reservation; 39°21′11″N 94°55′01″W	Leavenworth	
15	Fort Leavenworth National Cemetery	Fort Leavenworth National Cemetery	July 15, 1999 (#99000834)	Within Fort Leavenworth Military Reservation; 39°21′05″N 94°55′48″W	Fort Leavenworth	
16	Greenwood Cemetery		May 16, 2022 (#100007706)	Tonganoxie Rd. and Limit St. 39°17′19″N 94°56′21″W	Leavenworth	
17	Senator William A. Harris House		November 5, 1974 (#74000841)	Northwest of Linwood on K-32; 39°00′15″N 95°02′36″W	Linwood	
18	Fred Harvey House	Fred Harvey House	April 26, 1972 (#72000510)	624 Olive St. 39°18′41″N 94°55′01″W	Leavenworth	
19	Helmers Manufacturing Company Building	Helmers Manufacturing Company Building	October 8, 2009 (#09000809)	300 Santa Fe St./2500 2nd St. 39°17′32″N 94°54′25″W	Leavenworth	
20	Hollywood Theater	Hollywood Theater	October 25, 1990 (#90001575)	401 Delaware St. 39°19′05″N 94°54′54″W	Leavenworth	
21	Alice and Edwin Holman Farmstead		April 7, 2023 (#100008785)	26352 New Lawrence Dr. 39°15′05″N 94°57′23″W	Leavenworth	
22	Hund School	Hund School	March 9, 2000 (#00000158)	31874 179th St. 39°21′01″N 94°59′32″W	Leavenworth	
23	Merritt Insley House and Outbuildings	Merritt Insley House and Outbuildings	October 2, 1986 (#86002801)	602 Seneca St. 39°18′48″N 94°55′08″W	Leavenworth	
24	Horace and Rosemond Lamborn Farmstead		October 6, 2011 (#11000725)	25761 151st. St. 39°14′27″N 94°55′56″W	Leavenworth	
25	Lansing Man Archeological Site		March 24, 1971 (#71000316)	Address restricted	Lansing	
26	Leavenworth County Courthouse	Leavenworth County Courthouse	April 26, 2002 (#02000394)	300 Walnut St. 39°18′19″N 94°54′43″W	Leavenworth	
27	Leavenworth Downtown Historic District	Leavenworth Downtown Historic District	April 26, 2002 (#02000389)	Roughly Cherokee St., Delaware St., S. Fifth St., and Shawnee St. 39°19′05″N 94°54′55″W	Leavenworth	
28	Leavenworth Historic Industrial District	Leavenworth Historic Industrial District	April 29, 2002 (#02000406)	Roughly Third St. Choctaw St., Second St. and Cherokee St. 39°19′00″N 94°54′36″W	Leavenworth	
29	Leavenworth Public Library	Leavenworth Public Library	July 30, 1986 (#86002010)	601 S. Fifth St. 39°18′48″N 94°54′55″W	Leavenworth	
30	Leavenworth Terminal Railway & Bridge Company Freight Depot	Leavenworth Terminal Railway & Bridge Company Freight Depot	May 6, 2009 (#09000274)	306 S. 7th St. 39°18′59″N 94°55′06″W	Leavenworth	
31	Little Stranger Church and Cemetery	Little Stranger Church and Cemetery	January 7, 2015 (#14001120)	Northeastern corner of Tonganoxie and Stranger Rds. 39°14′43″N 94°58′26″W	Leavenworth	
32	North Broadway Historic District	North Broadway Historic District	July 3, 2002 (#02000719)	Along N. Broadway between Seneca and Ottawa Sts. 39°19′15″N 94°55′18″W	Leavenworth	
33	North Broadway School	North Broadway School	October 6, 2011 (#11000726)	801 N. Broadway St. 39°19′29″N 94°55′24″W	Leavenworth	
34	North Esplanade Historic District	North Esplanade Historic District	December 12, 1977 (#77000587)	203-515 N. Esplanade; 39°19′20″N 94°54′36″W	Leavenworth	
35	Old Union Depot	Old Union Depot	March 11, 1982 (#82002663)	201 S. Main St. 39°19′07″N 94°54′33″W	Leavenworth	Former Union Station, currently the Leavenworth Riverfront Community Center
36	Paul Site		September 6, 2005 (#05000977)	Address restricted	Tonganoxie	
37	David W. Powers House	David W. Powers House	August 30, 1977 (#77000588)	2 miles northwest of Leavenworth off U.S. Route 73; 39°21′00″N 94°57′44″W	Leavenworth	
38	Quarry Creek Archeological Site		April 23, 1973 (#73000761)	Northern side of McPherson Avenue immediately west of Sylvan Trail; 39°21′38″N 94°55′36″W	Leavenworth	Along with the McPherson Site on the other side of McPherson Avenue, the largest Kansas City Hopewell site in the Leavenworth area
39	Scott Site		October 29, 2004 (#04001189)	Address restricted	Tonganoxie	
40	William Small Memorial Home for Aged Women	William Small Memorial Home for Aged Women	September 23, 2020 (#100005624)	711 North Broadway St. 39°19′26″N 94°55′21″W	Leavenworth	
41	South Esplanade Historic District	South Esplanade Historic District	July 3, 2002 (#02000720)	Roughly bounded by Arch, Olive and S. Second Sts. and railroad 39°18′38″N 94°54′26″W	Leavenworth	
42	Stonehaven Farm		June 29, 2018 (#100002626)	19801 Tonganoxie Dr. 39°07′56″N 95°03′29″W	Tonganoxie	
43	Sumner Elementary School		August 4, 2011 (#11000504)	1501 5th Ave. 39°18′10″N 94°55′01″W	Leavenworth	
44	Third Avenue Historic District	Third Avenue Historic District	July 3, 2002 (#02000721)	Roughly bounded by 2nd and Aves. and Congress and Middle Sts. 39°18′27″N 94°54′53″W	Leavenworth	
45	Union Park Historic District	Union Park Historic District	July 3, 2002 (#02000722)	Roughly bounded by Chestnut, Congress, S. 6th, and W. 7th Sts. 39°18′39″N 94°55′00″W	Leavenworth	
46	Western Branch, National Home for Disabled Volunteer Soldiers	Western Branch, National Home for Disabled Volunteer Soldiers	April 30, 1999 (#99000456)	4101 S. 4th St. 39°16′43″N 94°53′29″W	Leavenworth	National Historic Landmark designation June 23, 2011
47	Zacharias Site (14LV380)		January 8, 1987 (#86003517)	Left bank of Salt Creek above its confluence with the Missouri River; 39°22′00″N 94°57′11″W	Leavenworth	

== Former listing ==
	Name on the Register	Image	Date listed	Date removed	Location	City or town	Description
1	Biehler Barn		April 11, 1977 (#77000585)	February 22, 1979	2.5 miles north of Easton	Easton	Destroyed by fire on December 22, 1978.

== See also ==
- List of National Historic Landmarks in Kansas
- National Register of Historic Places listings in Kansas
