= Erasmus T. Carr =

American architect

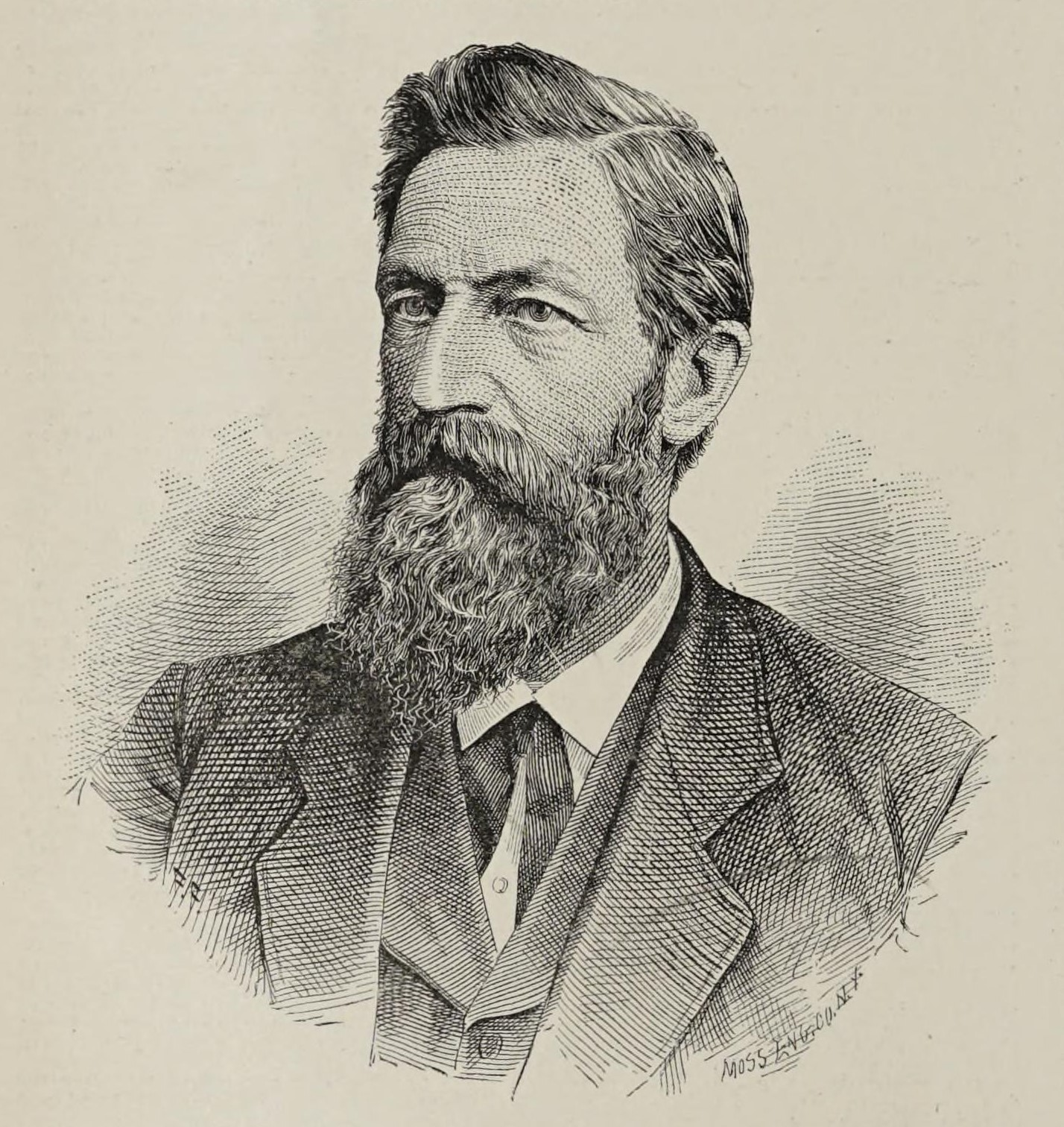
- Erasmus T. Carr, circa 1883
- Born: October 25, 1825; Greenfield, New York
- Died: May 12, 1915 (aged 89); Glendale, California
- Occupation: Architect
- Awards: Fellow, American Institute of Architects (1888)
- Practice: Erasmus T. Carr; Carr & Schultz; Carr & Grodavent; Carr & Feth

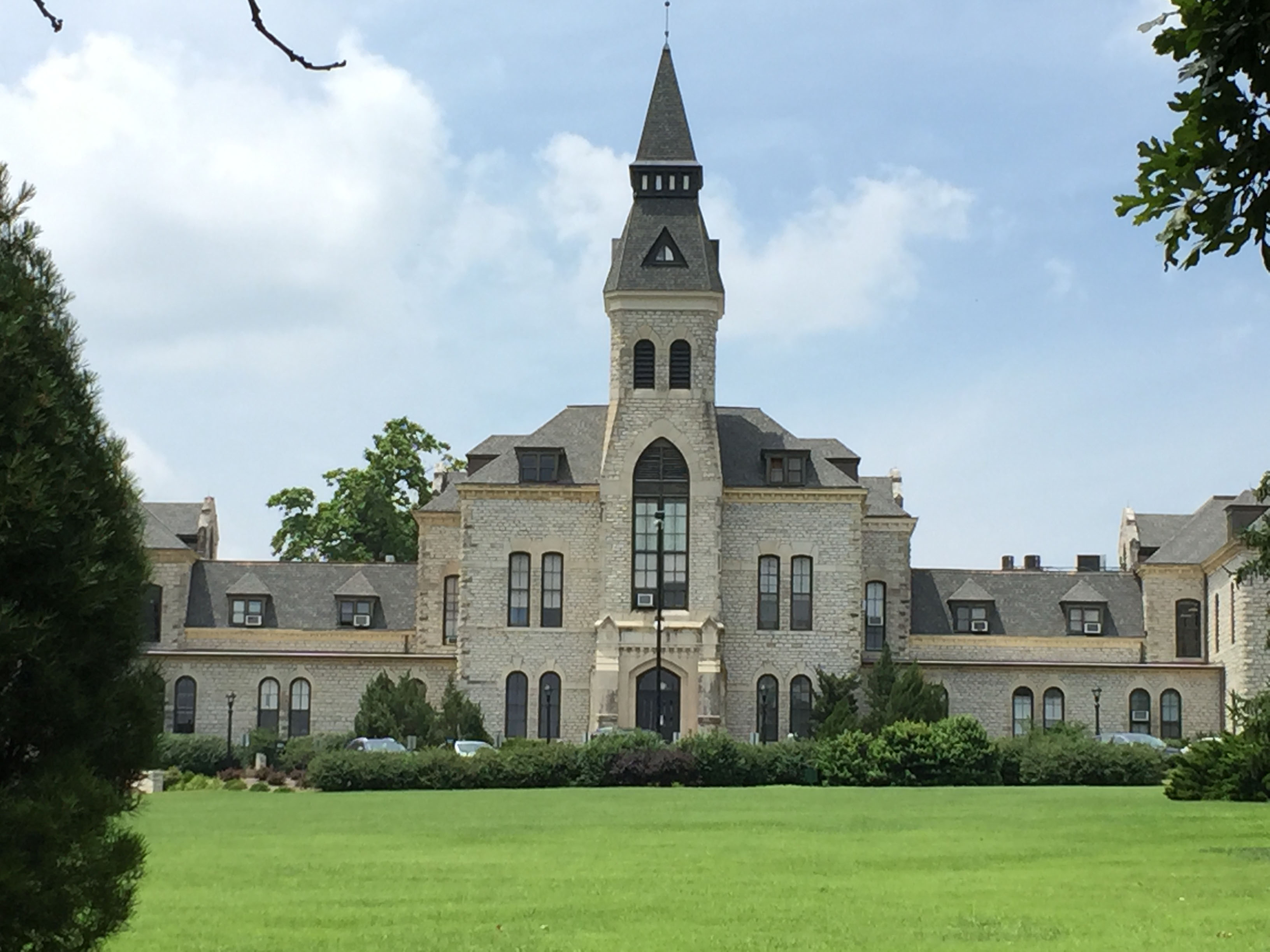
Anderson Hall of Kansas State University, designed by Carr and completed in phases beginning in 1879.

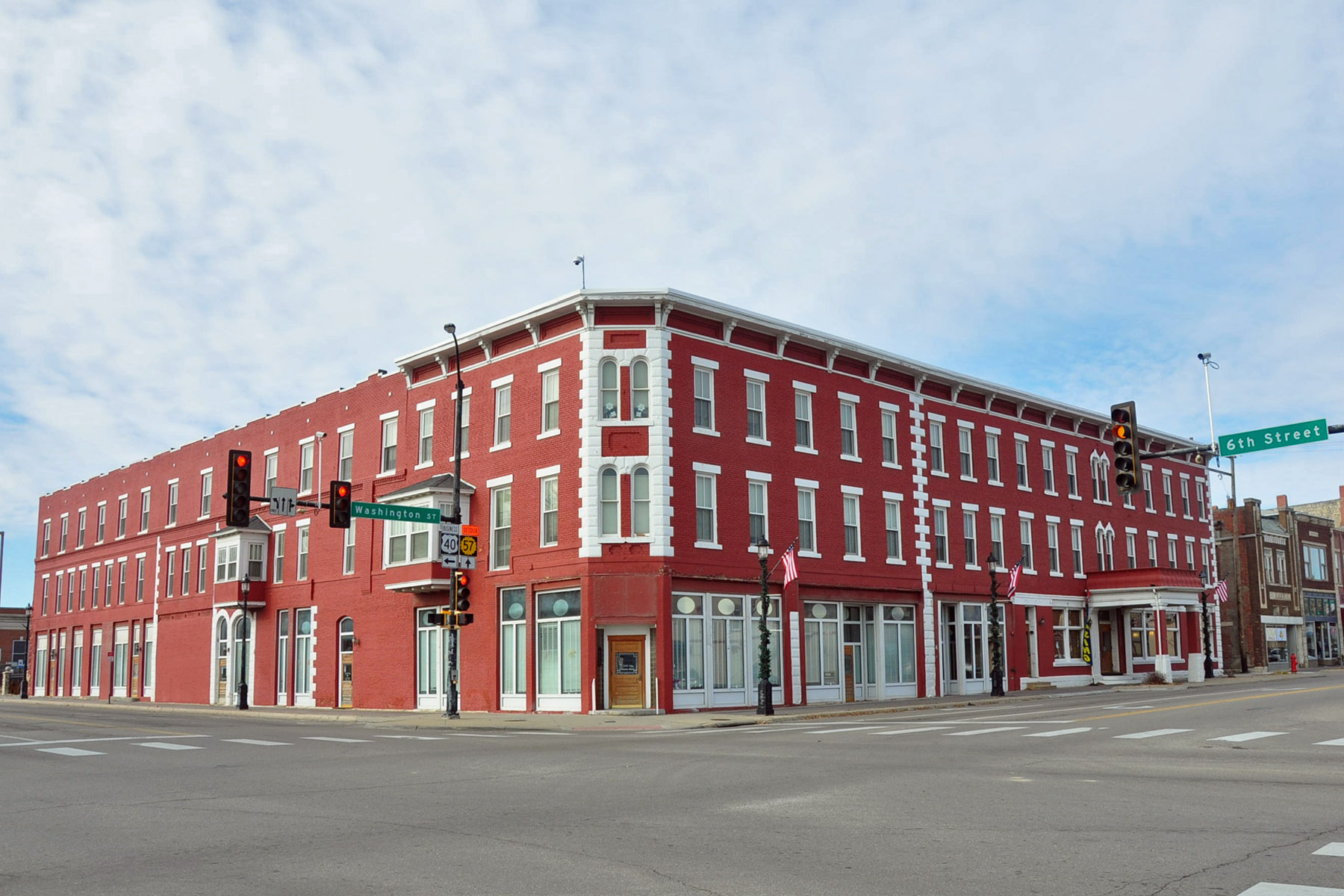
The Bartell House in Junction City, designed by Carr and completed in 1879.

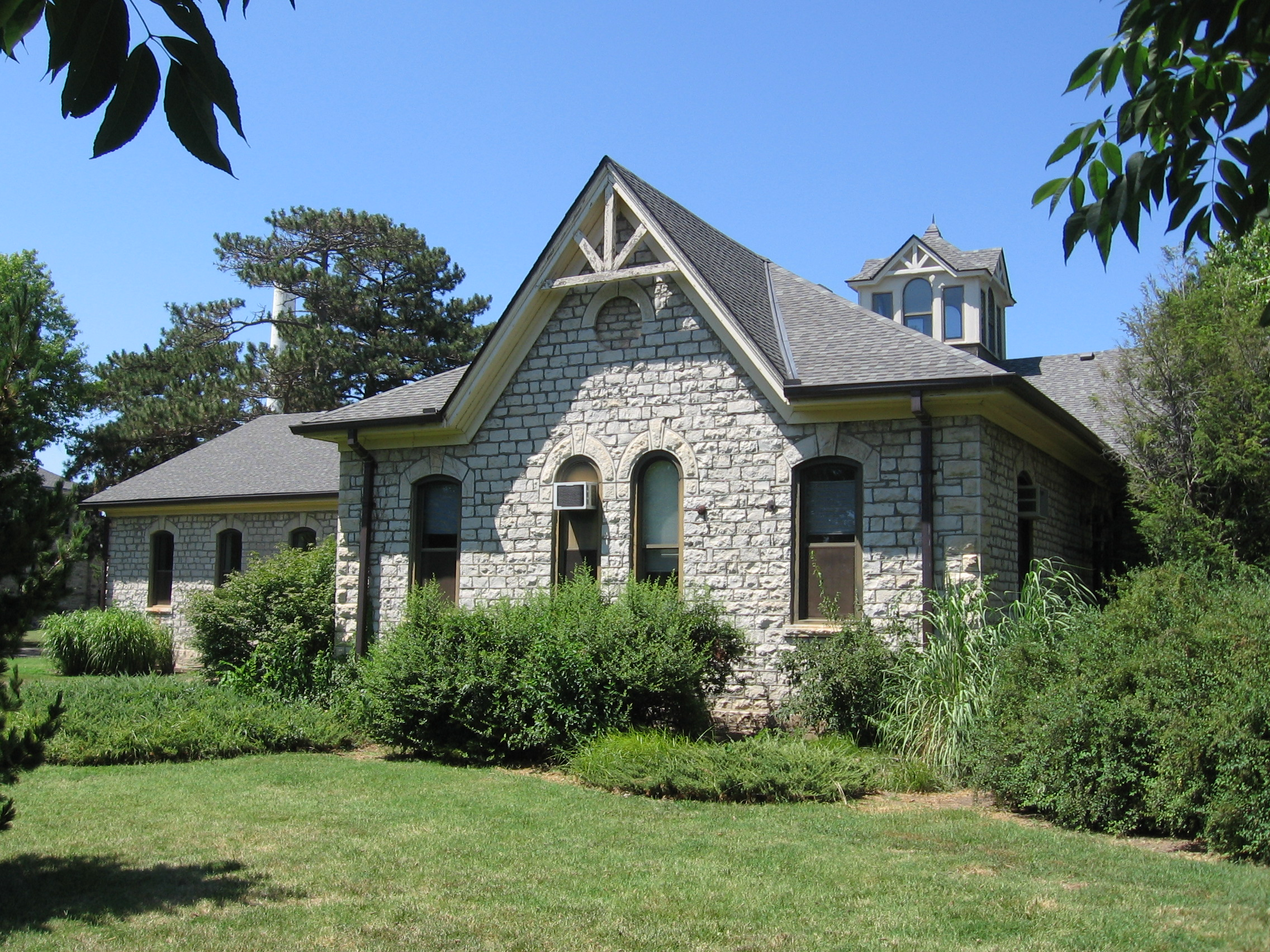
Holtz Hall of Kansas State University, designed by Carr and completed in 1884.

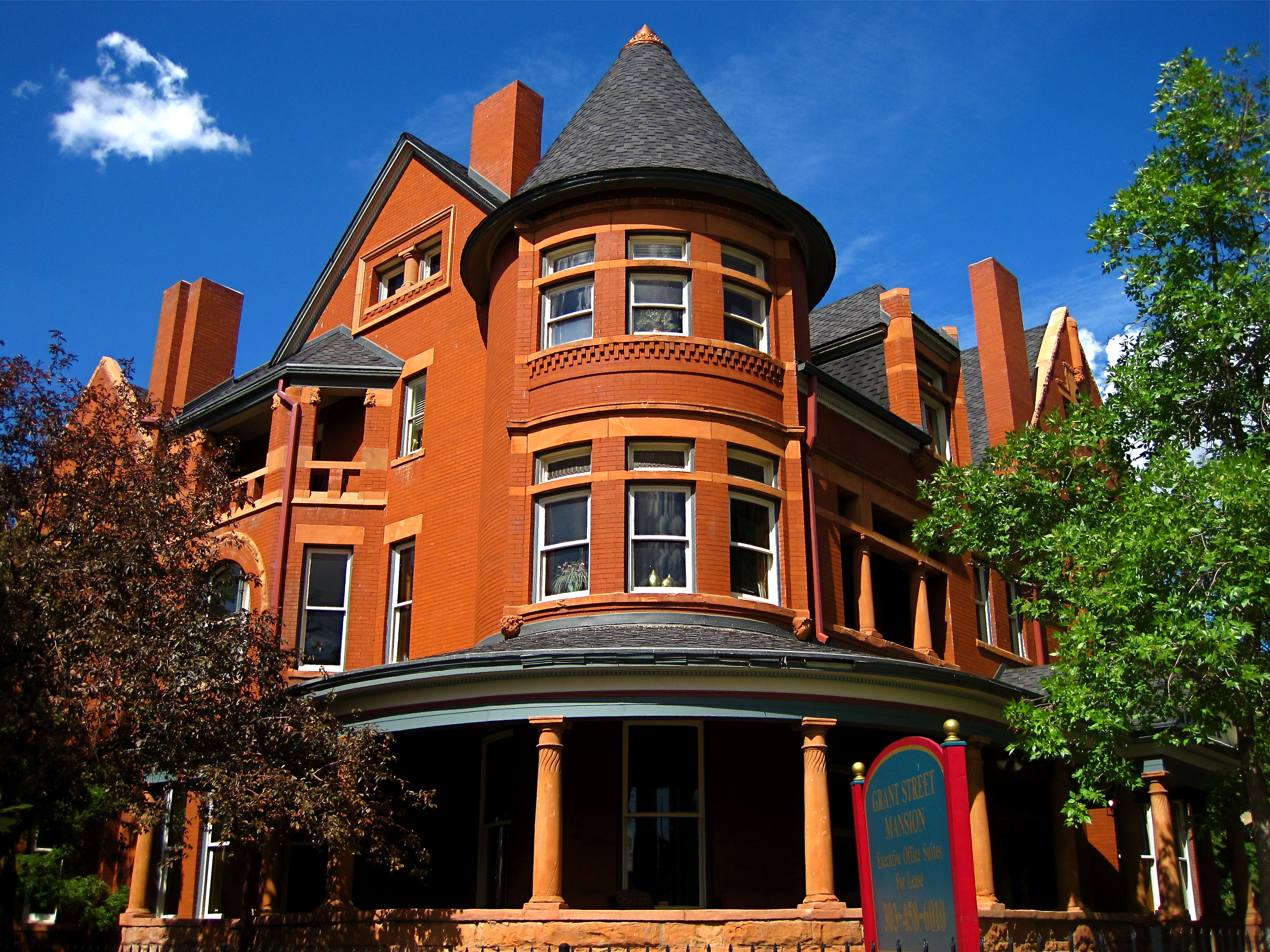
Sheedy Mansion in Denver, designed by Carr & Feth and completed in 1892.

Erasmus T. Carr FAIA (October 25, 1825 – May 12, 1915) was an American architect in practice in Leavenworth, Kansas, Denver, Colorado and Miles City, Montana from 1857 until his retirement in 1898. Carr, along with John G. Haskell, was one of the first two professional architects to practice in Kansas.

== Life and career ==
Erasmus Theodore Carr was born October 25, 1825, in Greenfield, New York to Almon Carr and Arathusa Carr, née Morse. As a young man he was trained as a mason and carpenter. In 1852 he moved to Syracuse, New York, where he worked as a builder. In 1855 he moved to St. Paul, Minnesota and almost immediately was hired to superintend construction at Fort Leavenworth, outside Leavenworth. At the close of this work in 1856 he returned east. This was planned as a permanent move, but in the spring of 1857 he returned to Leavenworth, where he opened an architect's office. While maintaining his independent practice, he was again hired by the government in 1859 to take charge of construction at Fort Leavenworth. During the Civil War Carr intended to enlist, but did not at the request of General Jesse L. Reno, who thought he was most useful at Leavenworth. His work at the fort was not complete until 1871.

After completing his work for the federal government Carr briefly formed the partnership of Carr & Schultz, which was responsible for the new Leavenworth County Courthouse, completed in 1874. Carr formed a second partnership, Carr & Grodavent, in 1884 with Frank J. Grodavent. This was dissolved in 1887. In 1891 he moved to Denver, then a boomtown, and formed a third and final partnership, Carr & Feth, with William Pratt Feth. This was dissolved in 1893 and Carr moved on to Miles City, Montana, where his daughter and son-in-law, Jepp Ryan, lived. In 1898 Carr retired from practice and Ryan closed out his business interests in Miles City. The family then returned to Leavenworth.

Carr was made a Fellow of the Western Association of Architects in 1885, and was also elected a Fellow of the American Institute of Architects in 1888. The two organizations merged in 1889. Carr's membership in the organization lapsed in 1895, while he was resident in Montana. In all of the places he lived Carr was prominent in Masonic circles. He originally joined the Masons in 1856 in Leavenworth. At the time of his death he was a 33rd degree Mason.

At least four buildings designed by Carr have been listed on the United States National Register of Historic Places, and others contribute to listed historic districts.

== Personal life ==
Carr was married in 1859 to Margaret Redfern Cubbins. They had one daughter, Addie Bell, who married Jepp Ryan. After the death of Mrs. Carr in 1903 the family moved to California. Carr died May 12, 1915, at his daughter's home in Glendale at the age of 89.

== Architectural works ==
- 1867 – Henry W. Gillett house, (Note: A contributing resource to the North Broadway Historic District, NRHP-listed in 2002.) 319 N Broadway St, Leavenworth, Kansas
- 1868 – Lansing Correctional Facility, 301 E Kansas Ave, Lansing, Kansas
- 1869 – Alexander A. Higginbotham house, (Note: A contributing resource to the Union Park Historic District, NRHP-listed in 2002.) 624 Olive St, Leavenworth, Kansas
- 1872 – White Cloud School, (Note: NRHP-listed.) (Note: A contributing resource to the White Cloud Historic District, NRHP-listed in 1996.) 103 5th St, White Cloud, Kansas
- 1873 – Administration Building, (Note: Destroyed by fire.) Emporia State University, Emporia, Kansas
- 1873 – Morris County Courthouse, (Note: Demolished.) 501 W Main St, Council Grove, Kansas
- 1874 – Leavenworth County Courthouse, 300 Walnut St, Leavenworth, Kansas
- 1876 – Kansas and Colorado State Building, Centennial Exposition, Philadelphia
- 1877 – Nemaha County Courthouse, 607 Nemaha St, Seneca, Kansas
- 1879 – Anderson Hall, Kansas State University, Manhattan, Kansas
- 1879 – Bartell House, (Note: A contributing resource to the Junction City Downtown Historic District, NRHP-listed in 2006.) 614 N Washington St, Junction City, Kansas
- 1879 – Brown County Courthouse, 601 Oregon St, Hiawatha, Kansas
- 1880 – Administration Building, Emporia State University, Emporia, Kansas
- 1883 – Manhattan Grange, (Note: A contributing resource to the Downtown Manhattan Historic District, NRHP-listed in 2007.) 431 Poyntz Ave, Manhattan, Kansas
- 1883 – Wyandotte County Courthouse, 7th St and Minnesota Ave, Kansas City, Kansas
- 1884 – Holtz Hall, Kansas State University, Manhattan, Kansas
- 1885 – Western Branch, National Home for Disabled Volunteer Soldiers, (Note: Designed by Hornblower & Marshall, architects, with Carr & Grodavent, associate architects.) Leavenworth, Kansas
- 1889 – Ward Memorial Building, Western Branch, National Home for Disabled Volunteer Soldiers, Leavenworth, Kansas
- 1892 – Sheedy Mansion, 1115 Grant St, Denver
