= Sheedy Mansion =

Mansion in Denver listed on the National Register of Historic Places

- U.S. National Register of Historic Places
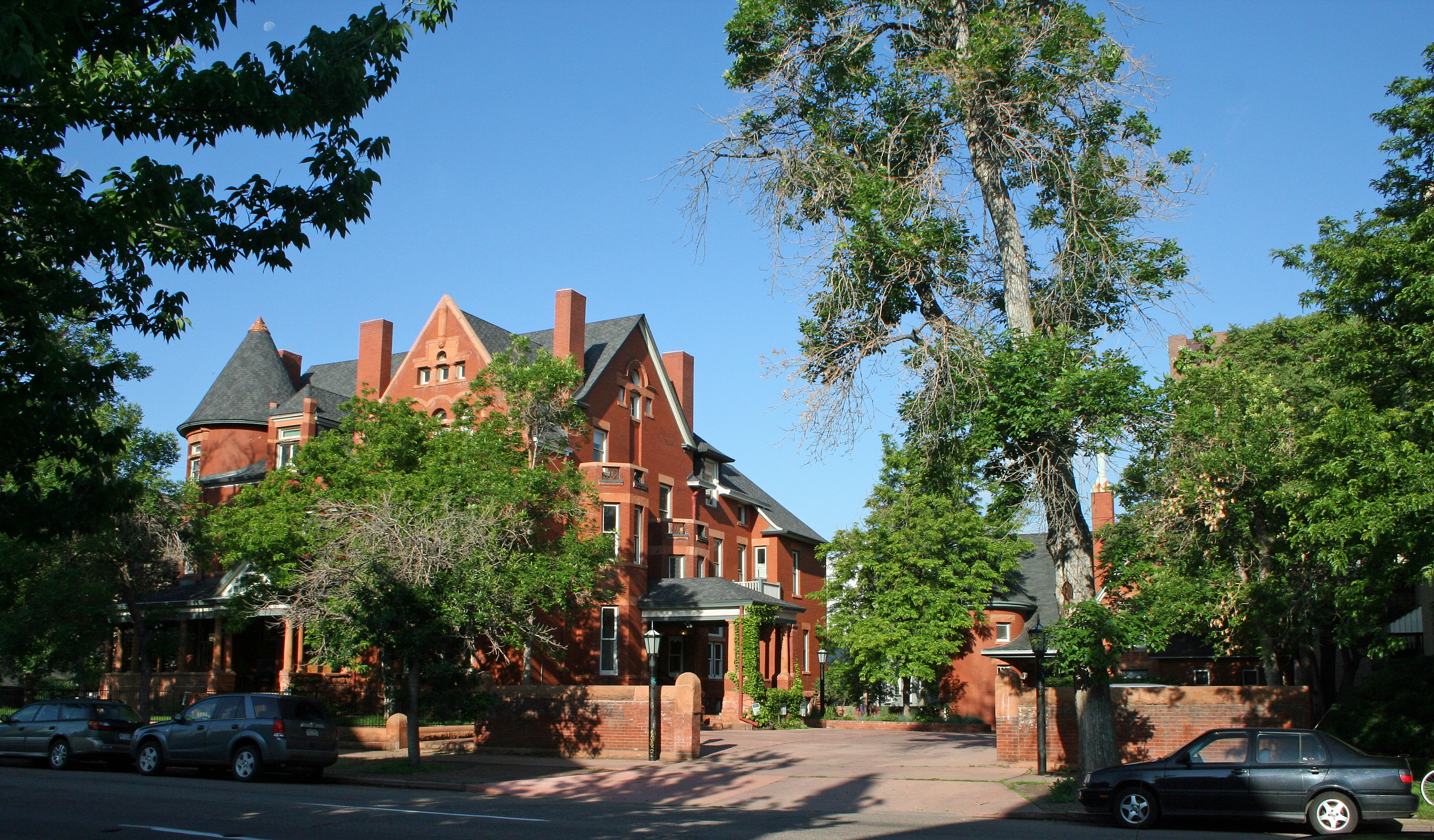
- The property in 2009

- Location within Colorado Location within the United States
- Location: 1115-1121 Grant Street, Denver, Colorado
- Coordinates: 39°44′3″N 104°59′1″W
- Built: 1892
- Architect: Erasmus T. Carr; William Pratt Feth
- Architectural style: Queen Anne, Richardsonian Romanesque
- NRHP reference No.: 04000780
- Added to NRHP: August 4, 2004

The Sheedy Mansion and its accompanying carriage house is a historic residence located at 1115-1121 Grant St. in Denver, Colorado. It was built in 1892 and was added to the National Register of Historic Places in 2004.

== Architecture ==
The three-story mansion, with accompanying two-story carriage house, cover a total of 20,000 sq. ft. (16,000 sq. ft. for mansion and 4,000 sq. ft. for carriage house) and contain 42 rooms. It was designed by architects Erasmus T. Carr and William Pratt Feth and displays a combination of the Queen Anne and Richardsonian Romanesque architectural styles. The exterior is constructed of red brick and sandstone.

== History ==
The mansion gets its name from its original owner, Dennis Sheedy. Sheedy first commissioned Kansan architects Carr & Feth to design the residence in 1890. Construction finished two years later, and it remained in the Sheedy family’s possession until 1923, when Dennis Sheedy died and his wife moved away.

In 1927, the mansion was purchased by Helen G. Bonfils, who repurposed it into a fine arts studio. It remained an art studio until 1974. The mansion then transferred ownership to Communicor Realtors, who converted both the mansion and carriage house into private office suites. Today, it is owned by event management company Unbridled Solutions. It was added to the National Register of Historic Places on August 4, 2004.

== See also ==
- Peabody-Whitehead Mansion, another historic mansion located across the street at 1128 Grant St., listed as a Denver Landmark
