= Peabody-Whitehead Mansion =

Historically significant mansion in Denver, Colorado

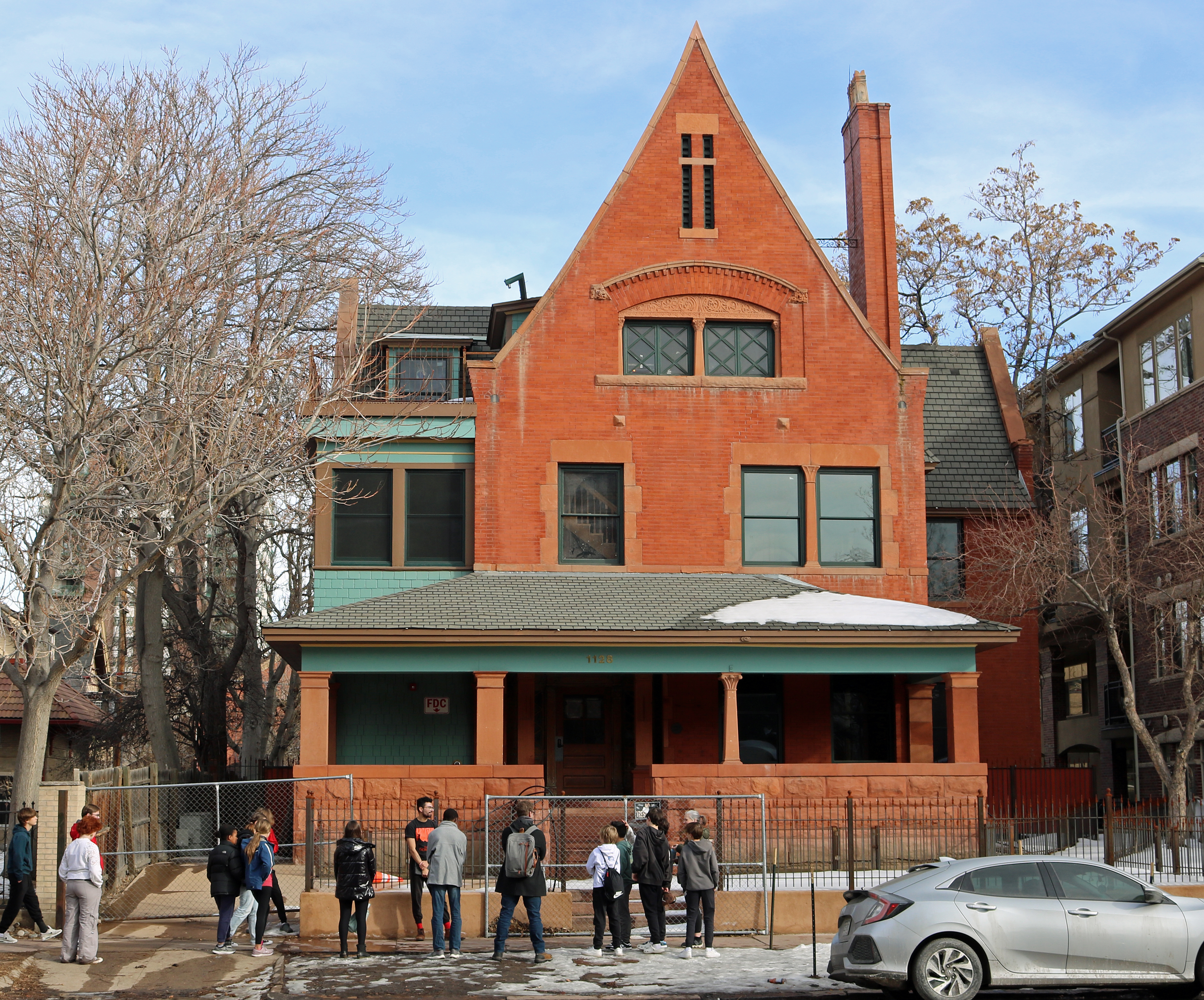
- The house in 2023

- Location within Colorado
- 39.73441°N 104.98327°W
- Location: 1128 Grant St., Denver, Colorado

History
- Built: 1889

Site notes
- Architect: Frank Edbrooke

Denver Landmarks
- Designated: 1993

The Peabody-Whitehead mansion is a historic residence located at 1128 Grant Street in Denver, Colorado. The three-story brick mansion was designed in 1889 by architect Frank Edbrooke, designer of Denver's famous Brown Palace Hotel. The mansion has been listed as a Denver landmark since 1993.

The mansion was originally owned by battlefield surgeon and prominent early figure in Denver's medical community Dr. William Riddick Whitehead. In 1903 and 1904, it served as the residence of Colorado Governor James Hamilton Peabody.

The media and local residents use the names "Peabody mansion" and "Peabody house" interchangeably to refer to both the Denver mansion and a different historic mansion located in Cañon City. However, James Peabody himself referred to the Cañon City home as the “Peabody House”, while “Peabody Mansion” was the name given to the home in Denver.

In 2012, the mansion was featured in an episode of the Travel Channel show Ghost Adventures.

== History ==
Dr. William R. Whitehead was born in 1831 in Suffolk, Virginia. After studying medicine in the United States, he studied medicine in Paris, and then moved to Vienna where he volunteered as a surgeon in the Russian Army during the Crimean War. He eventually moved back to United States and settled in New York where he continued his medical career.

At the beginning of the Civil War, he returned to Virginia where he served as a surgeon in the Confederate Army. In 1872, following the Civil War, he moved to Denver, Colorado due to the poor health of his wife and son. There, he was able to earn a reputation as a leading figure in the medical community. In 1874, he was elected to the Denver City Council, and shortly afterward, he became the chairman of the Denver Board of Health. In 1877, he was elected President of the Denver Medical Association.

In 1889, Whitehead commissioned renowned architect Frank E. Edbrooke to design what is now known as the Peabody-Whitehead mansion. Edbrooke is known for such buildings as the Brown Palace Hotel, the Central Presbyterian Church, the Tabor Opera House, and the Loretto Heights Academy. The Queen Anne style mansion was built with stone taken from Colorado's Red Rock Canyon. Whitehead resided in the mansion until his death in 1902.

In 1903, James H. Peabody, a Republican businessman from Cañon City, was elected Governor of Colorado. Colorado did not have an official Governor's mansion, so Peabody set out to find a residence in Denver. He lived in the mansion from 1903 to 1904.

In the mid-1950s, the mansion was used for apartments before eventually being transformed into a series of restaurants, bars, and nightclubs from the late '50s through the '80s. In the 1990s, it was purchased by Richard R. Arber Associates, an engineering firm. In 2006, it was purchased by Malbur Exchange Group & Associates (MEGA 1031) and Malbur Properties, LLC. It was used for office space in 2013. In 2017, there were plans to convert the building into luxury rental apartments. The house was also used by the chamber of commerce for a number of years, at some point.

In 1993, the mansion was listed as a Denver landmark by Ordinance 534 of the Denver city council.

== Paranormal reputation ==
For decades, locals have claimed the mansion is haunted. The rumors of paranormal activity are thought to have begun in the 1950s, when the mansion was converted to a restaurant.

In 2012, the property was featured in an episode of Travel Channel's Ghost Adventures.

== See also ==
- Sheedy Mansion, another historic mansion located across the street at 1115–1121 Grant St., listed on the National Register
- Peabody Mansion, another home of Governor Peabody in Cañon City, Colorado
