= Hund School =

- U.S. National Register of Historic Places
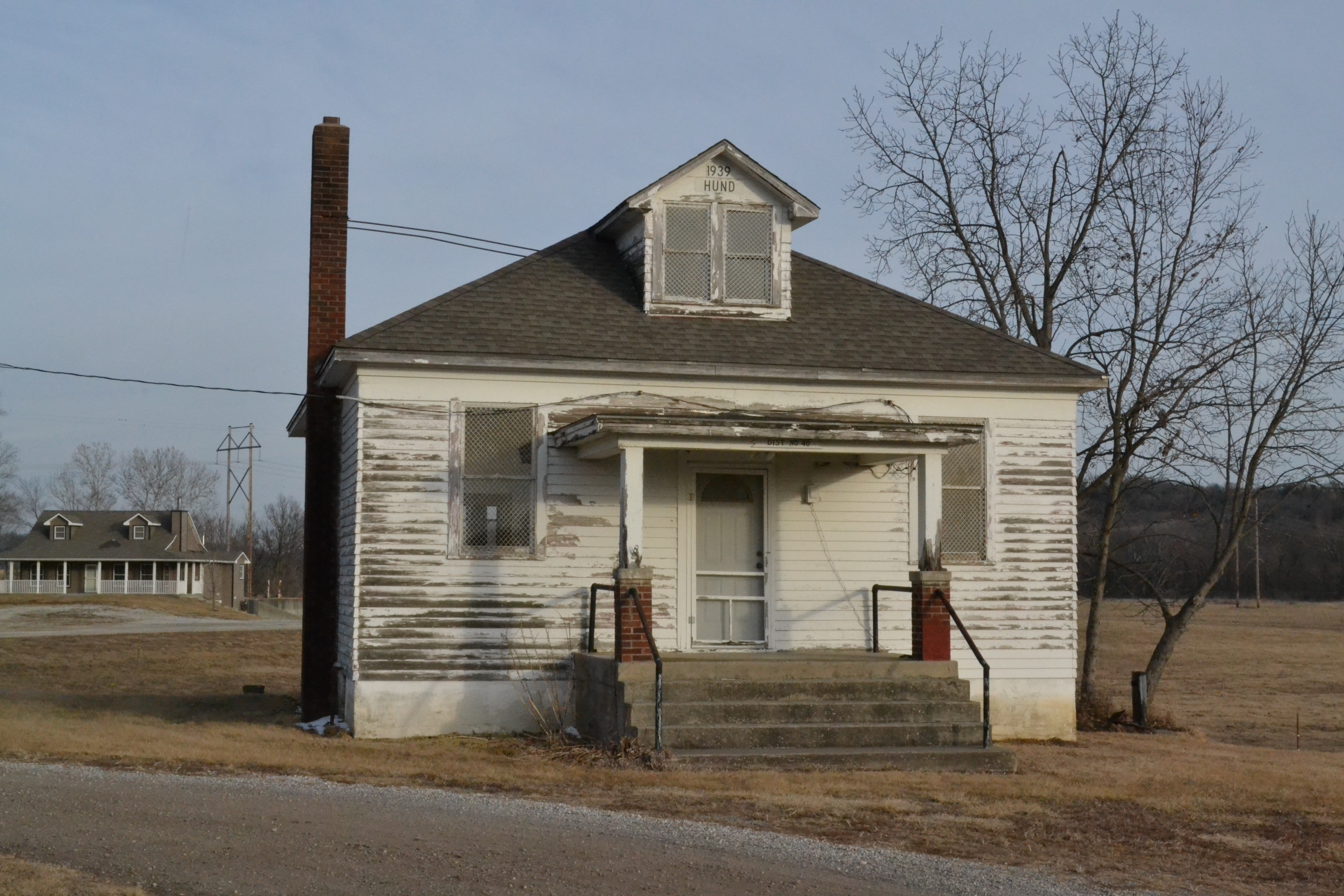

- Location within Kansas Location within the United States
- Location: 31874 179th Street, Leavenworth, KansasU.S.
- Built: 1939
- Architect: Ben Lingenfelser
- Architectural style: Bungalow
- NRHP reference No.: 00000158
- Added to NRHP: March 9, 2000

Hund School is a historic one-room schoolhouse northwest of the city of Leavenworth in Leavenworth County, Kansas. A wood bungalow, it was built in 1939 on land donated to the local school district by Wendelin and Josephine Hund in 1882. It replaced a school building that was destroyed in a fire.

The school building is typical of other rural schoolhouses built in Kansas. Within the building is a cloakroom, classroom with built-in library shelves, and a basement. Outside the school building is a hand-pump for water and an outhouse. The school operated from 1939 to 1965, serving primarily children of German heritage within walking distance. It was listed on the National Register of Historic Places in 2000. In 2000, the building was used as a storefront for Hund School Crafts.

It is the last one-room schoolhouse remaining in its original form, inside and out, in Leavenworth County.

== See also ==
- National Register of Historic Places listings in Leavenworth County, Kansas
