= Bartell House =

Historic house in Kansas, United States

- U.S. National Register of Historic Places
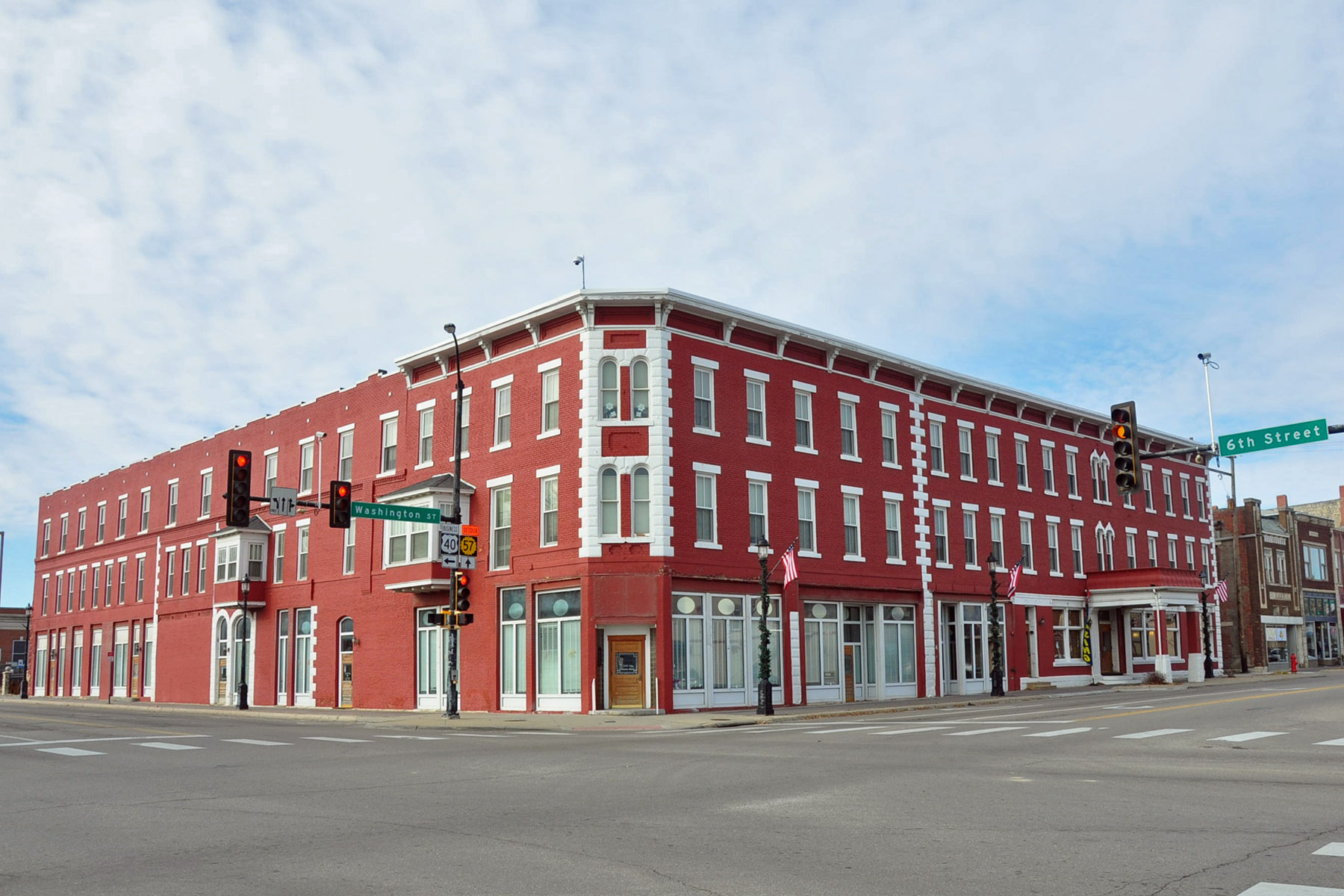

- Location within Kansas Location within the United States
- Location: 6th and Washington Sts. Junction City, Kansas
- Coordinates: 39°01′42″N 96°49′47″W
- Area: 1 acre (0.40 ha)
- Built: 1879
- Architect: Erasmus T. Carr
- Architectural style: Italianate, Commercial Palace
- NRHP reference No.: 80001466
- Added to NRHP: December 1, 1980

The Bartell House in Junction City, Kansas, is a hotel built in 1879. It is located at 6th and Washington Streets. It was listed on the National Register of Historic Places in 1980. It has also been known as Lamer Hotel.

It is a three-story brick "Commercial Palace" style hotel with stone trim. Extensions added later brought the building to a U-shape, within a 150 by 120 feet (46 m × 37 m) plan.

The hotel was designed by Leavenworth architect Erasmus T. Carr.
