= Anderson Hall (Manhattan, Kansas) =

- U.S. National Register of Historic Places
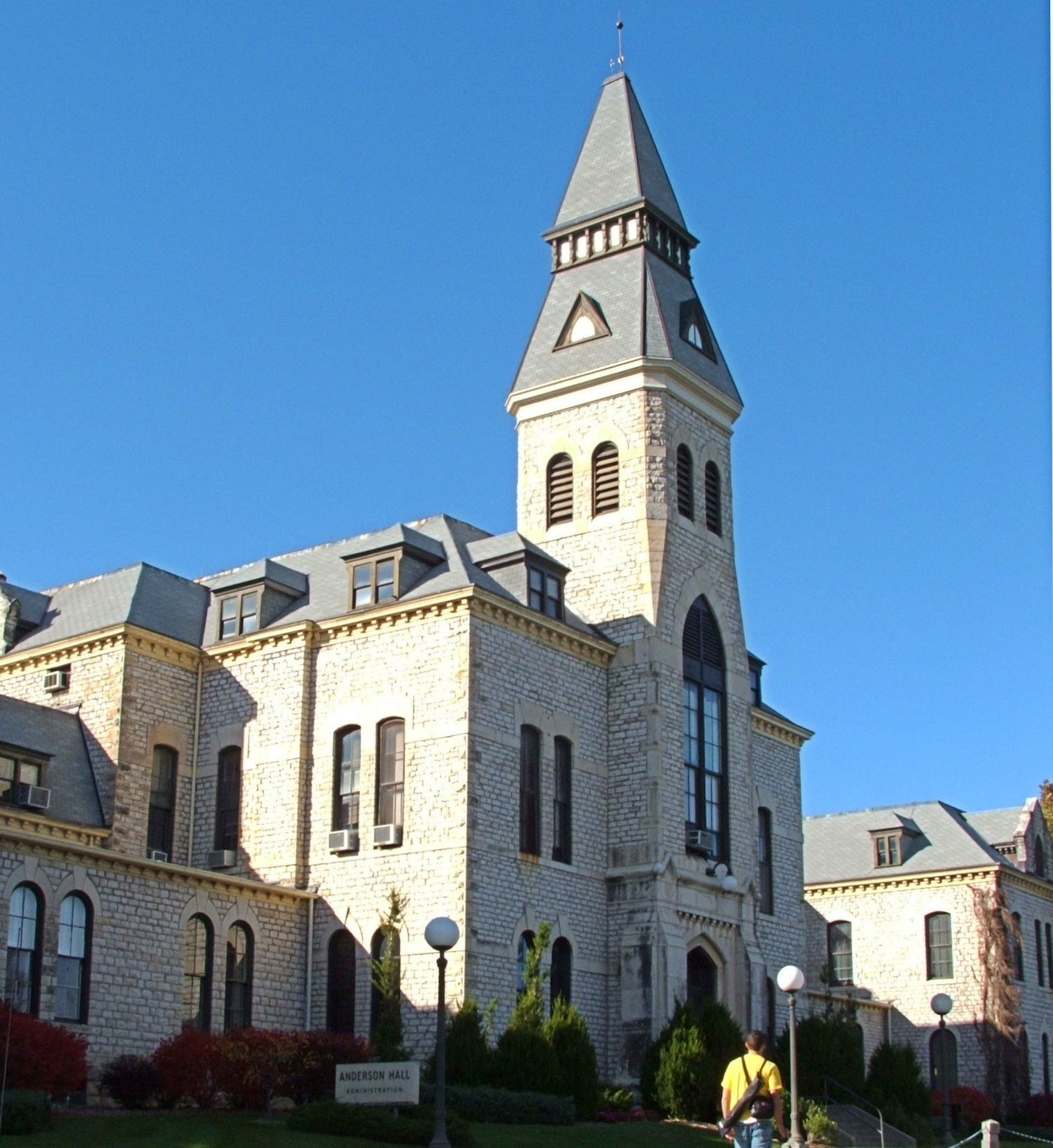
- Anderson Hall
- Location: Manhattan, KS
- Coordinates: 39°11′18.8″N 96°34′50.2″W
- Built: 1879
- Architect: Erasmus T. Carr
- Architectural style: Gothic
- NRHP reference No.: 80001471
- Added to NRHP: November 28, 1980

Anderson Hall is the central administration building for Kansas State University in the city of Manhattan, Kansas, United States. Designed by Erasmus T. Carr, it was originally called the Practical Agriculture Building when the first wing (now the north wing) was completed in 1879. In 1902, it was renamed "Anderson Hall" in honor of John Alexander Anderson, the second president of Kansas State Agricultural College (now Kansas State University). The building was added to the National Register of Historic Places in 1980.

Over time, this building has housed a diverse set of facilities, including a canteen, a barbershop, and a chapel. An electronic carillon was installed in 1965 to sound the hours.

== History ==
The building was constructed in three phases starting with the north wing, followed by the central section, and finished with the south wing. The construction was first financed by the state in 1877 with construction starting in 1878. The final wing was finished in 1884. The building's purpose has changed much over the years and it has been altered many times in its history.

=== Construction ===
The construction of Anderson Hall began in 1877 with an appropriation of $12,500 by the Kansas legislature for its north wing. Excavation began in March 1878 and the building was initially occupied a year later in 1879. The building initially housed classrooms for English, drawing, mathematics, and practical agriculture. It also housed the president's office, and the library from 1879 until 1894.

In 1880, the Kansas legislature made a new appropriation of $30,000 to build the central structure including the tower. The north wing of the building was also retrofitted at this time to make this building the first on campus to be equipped with steam heating. A time capsule was also embedded in the new foundation, which included some campus records, commencement speech transcripts, some copies of the school newspaper (The Industrialist), and other documents. A story in the newspaper in the June 4, 1981, issue stated, "incased [sic] in solid masonry, it will remain until resurrected by some curious antiquary, a thousand years hence."

The new central section contained a new office for the president, a fire-proof vault (under which the time capsule was buried), the main hall, and in the back (west) of the central section was the chapel. The main hall featured a large dome-like stained glass window at the top. The chapel had a sloped floor with 16-tiers of wooden folding chairs.

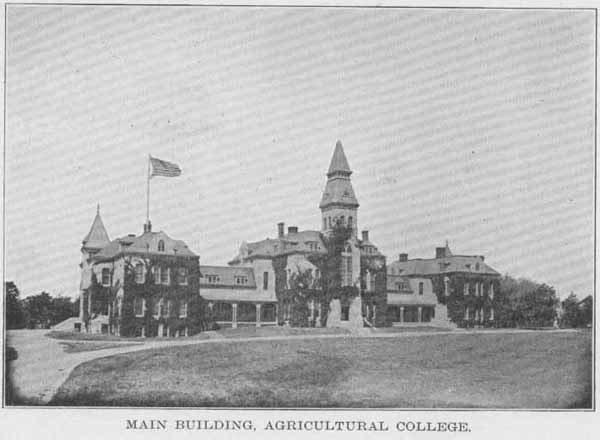
Anderson Hall, 1912

The south wing began construction in 1883 with an appropriation of $20,000 by the state legislature. It was completed in 1884. Two east facing porches were also added to the front of the building between the central section and the ends of the north and south wings at this time. The new wing featured a model kitchen and dairy, a sewing room, the Lady Superintendent's office, study rooms, and classrooms.

=== Remodeling ===
Here is a timeline illustrating modifications that have been made to Anderson Hall since its initial construction.

- 1887 - The chapel was extended and the attic of the building was finished.
- 1892 - The archway was opened from the secretary's office to the main hall.
- 1893 - A hall well on the second floor was closed.
- 1896 - A cement floor was added to the basement hall.
- 1897 - The president's office was moved to the south side of the main hall.
- 1903 - The porches were rebuilt and painted.
- 1904 - The literary society room was converted into four offices.
- 1908 - The chapel was split to make room for more architecture classrooms.
- 1919 - A canteen and barbershop were installed into the basement.
- 1920 - The chapel was turned into a recreation center.
- 1924 - The canteen and barbershop closed.
- 1933 - The east wall of the building was repaired from moisture damage caused by vines.
- 1939 - An office for the dean of women was added.
- 1945 - The wooden porches were converted into office space.
- 1961 - The east wall of the south wing was reinforced with steel pipes for a time and then removed when the wall was rebuilt.
- 1965 - An electric 98-bell carillon was installed in the tower as a gift from Mr. and Mrs. Ralf Hockins of Arrington, Kansas.
- 1989 - The central tower of Anderson was repaired.
- 1993 - On August 20, the tower was struck by lightning causing $1.25 million in damage to the building.

== Current uses ==
This building now contains many of the administrative offices for Kansas State University. This includes the office of the president, some of the vice presidents and deans, the provost's office, and several offices related to legal, public relations, human resources, and student administration.

== See also ==
- List of oldest buildings on Kansas colleges and universities
