= White Cloud Historic District =

Historic district in Kansas, United States

- U.S. National Register of Historic Places
- U.S. Historic district
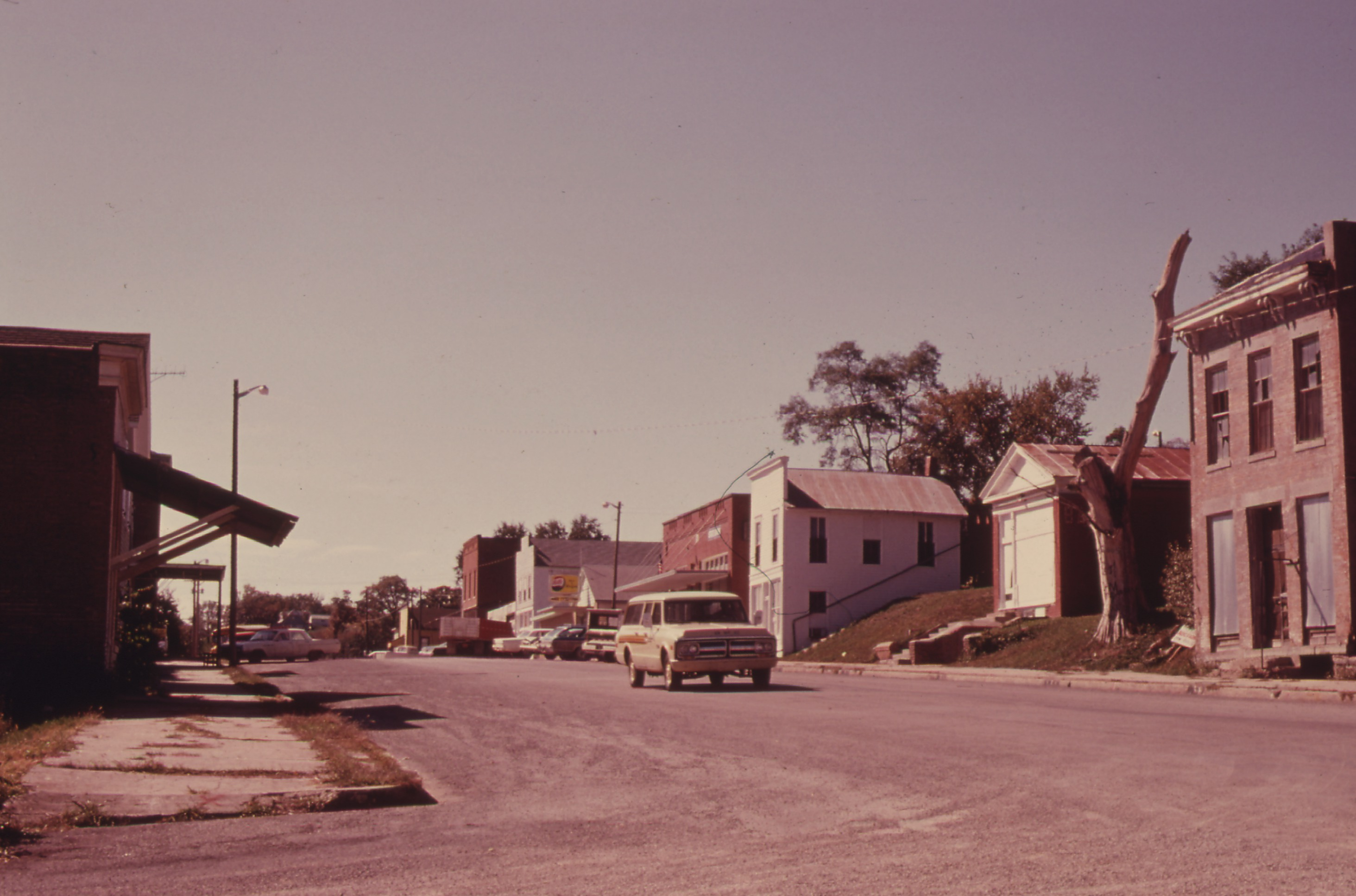
- Photo from 1974

- Location within Kansas Location within the United States
- Location: Roughly bounded by Poplar, 6th, Chesnut Sts. and KS7, White Cloud, Kansas
- Coordinates: 39°58′34″N 95°17′49″W
- Area: 41.3 acres (16.7 ha)
- Built: 1868
- Built by: M.b. Bowers; Wakefield & Co.
- Architect: Erasmus T. Carr
- Architectural style: Italianate, Gothic Revival, Greek Revival
- NRHP reference No.: 96000701
- Added to NRHP: June 28, 1996

The White Cloud Historic District is a 41.3 acres (16.7 ha) historic district in White Cloud, Kansas which was listed on the National Register of Historic Places in 1996. It is roughly bounded by Poplar, 6th, Chesnut Sts. and K-7 and included 67 contributing buildings and a contributing site, as well as 15 non-contributing buildings and a non-contributing site.

It includes Italianate, Gothic Revival, and Greek Revival architecture.

According to the National Register nomination, the following 12 are "key contributing buildings" in the district:

- Poulet House or Alexis Poulet House (1879-1880), on Poplar between 1st & 2nd, which was separately listed on the National Register in 1971
- White Cloud School/St. Joseph's Church (c.1865), on Poplar between 3rd & 4th, which was separately listed on the National Register in 1973
- James M. & Anna Beckett House (c.1866), at northeast corner of 2nd & Poplar
- C.W. Noyes House (c.1867), at southwest corner of 2nd & Poplar
- William Lynds House (1908), at southwest corner of 1st & Poplar
- White Cloud Barber Shop (1864), north side of Main between 1st & 2nd Streets
- Bailey & Noyes Fancy Dry Goods Store (1868–69), at northeast corner of 1st & Main. Included as tenants a bank, then by 1905 a post office.
- Sol Miller Building (1865–66), at southeast corner of 2nd & Main
- Atchison & Nebraska City Railroad Depot (1871, moved in 1938), on south side of Main between K-7 & 1st.
- J.E.H. Chapman House (1880), at northeast corner of 3rd & Chestnut
- Springer-Campbell House (1880), at southeast corner of 3rd & Chestnut
- James M. & Anna Beckett House (c.1866), at northeast corner of 2nd & Poplar. "This National Folk, gable-front house is an excellent example of the Greek Revival vernacular."

Others include:

- First State Bank building (1923), at northeast corner of 2nd & Main, which has the First State Bank of White Cloud in one half and the post office in the other.

The district overlooks the Missouri River.
