= Peabody Mansion =

Coordinates: 38°26′22″N 105°14′29″W

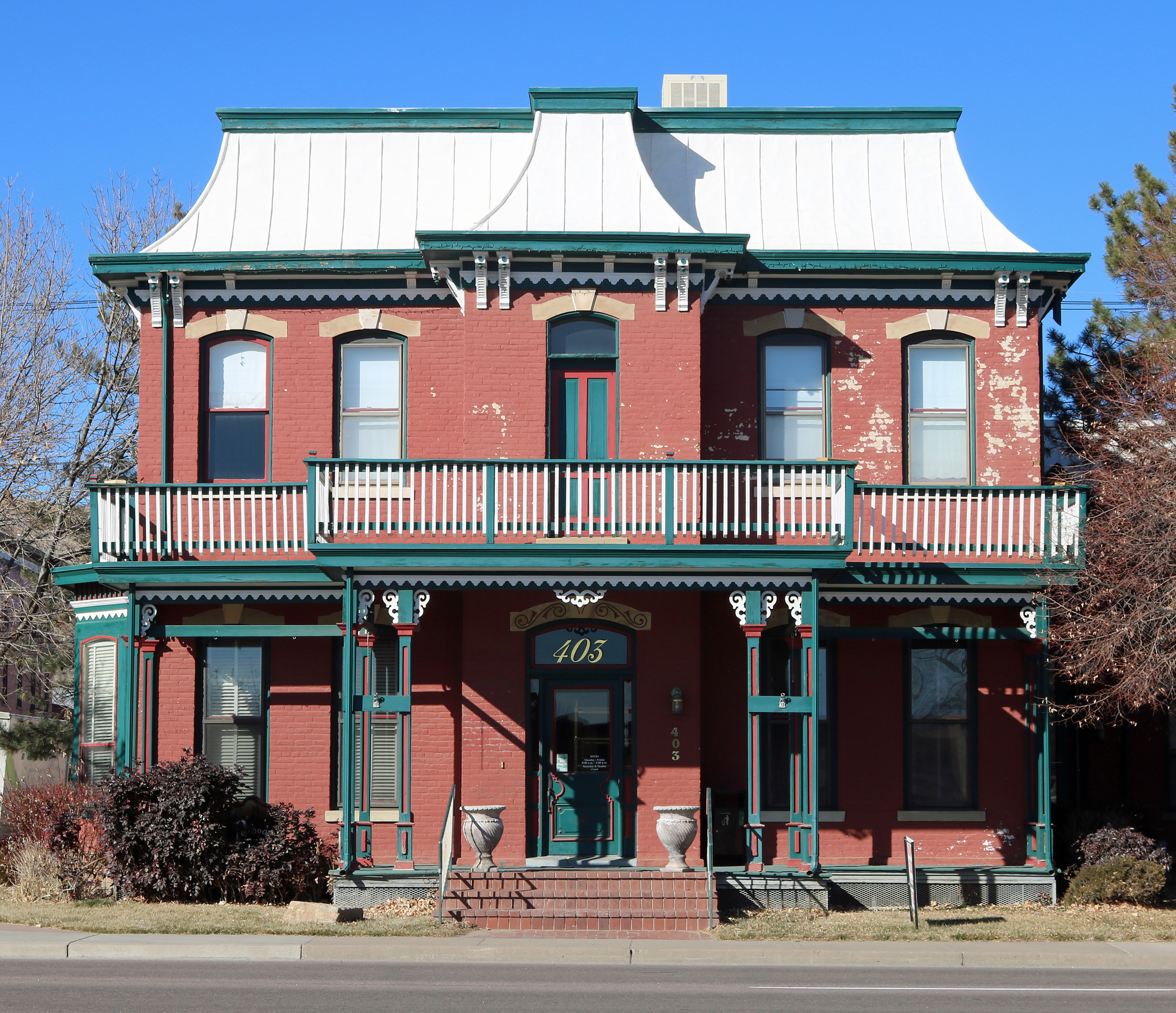
The mansion in 2020.

The Peabody Mansion is the former home of former Colorado governor James Hamilton Peabody. It was built on the corner of 4th and River, now 4th and Royal Gorge Boulevard (U.S. Highway 50) in Cañon City, Colorado. The mansion is a red brick Victorian two-story and is the current home of the Cañon City Chamber of Commerce. The house was built in 1881 by James Clelland, Governor Peabody's father-in-law. In the early 1990s, the building was slated to be demolished, but city residents asked that it be spared. Subsequently, the city purchased the house, which had been split up into apartments, and renovated it into office space for the Chamber of Commerce.
