= First Presbyterian Church, Leavenworth =

Historic church in Kansas, United States

- U.S. National Register of Historic Places
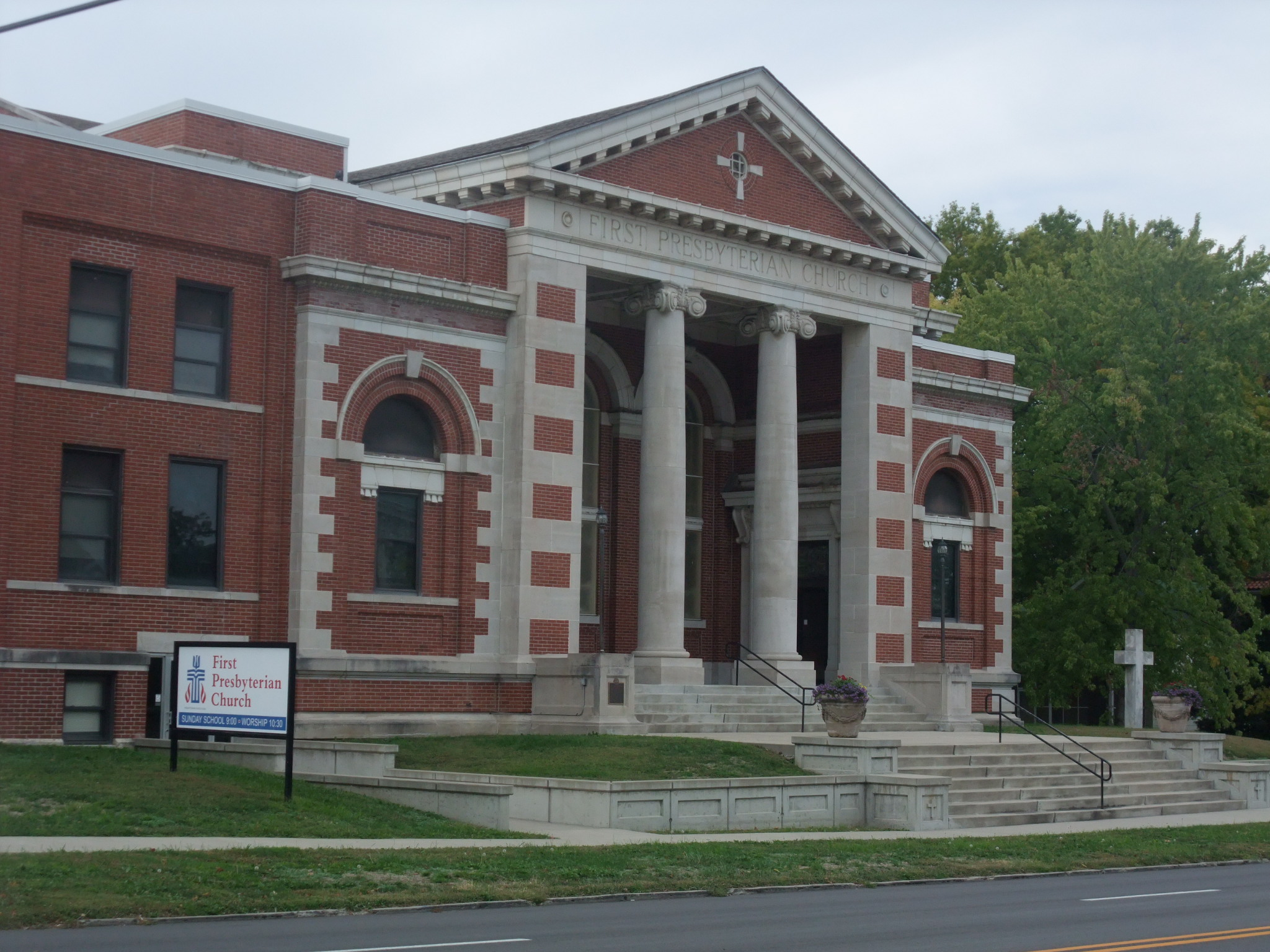

- Location within Kansas Location within the United States
- Location: 407 Walnut St., Leavenworth, Kansas
- Coordinates: 39°18′49″N 94°54′47″W
- Area: 0.7 acres (0.28 ha)
- Built: 1907-09
- Architect: Feth, William Pratt; et al.
- Architectural style: Classical Revival
- NRHP reference No.: 05001515
- Added to NRHP: January 11, 2006

First Presbyterian Church, Leavenworth is a historic Presbyterian church at 407 Walnut Street in Leavenworth, Kansas. It was designed by architect William Pratt Feth and built in 1907–09.

It was added to the National Register of Historic Places in 2006.

It is a Classical Revival-style brick building, with brick laid in stretcher bond. It has an Ionic portico.
