= Nathaniel H. Burt House =

Historic house in Kansas, United States

- U.S. National Register of Historic Places
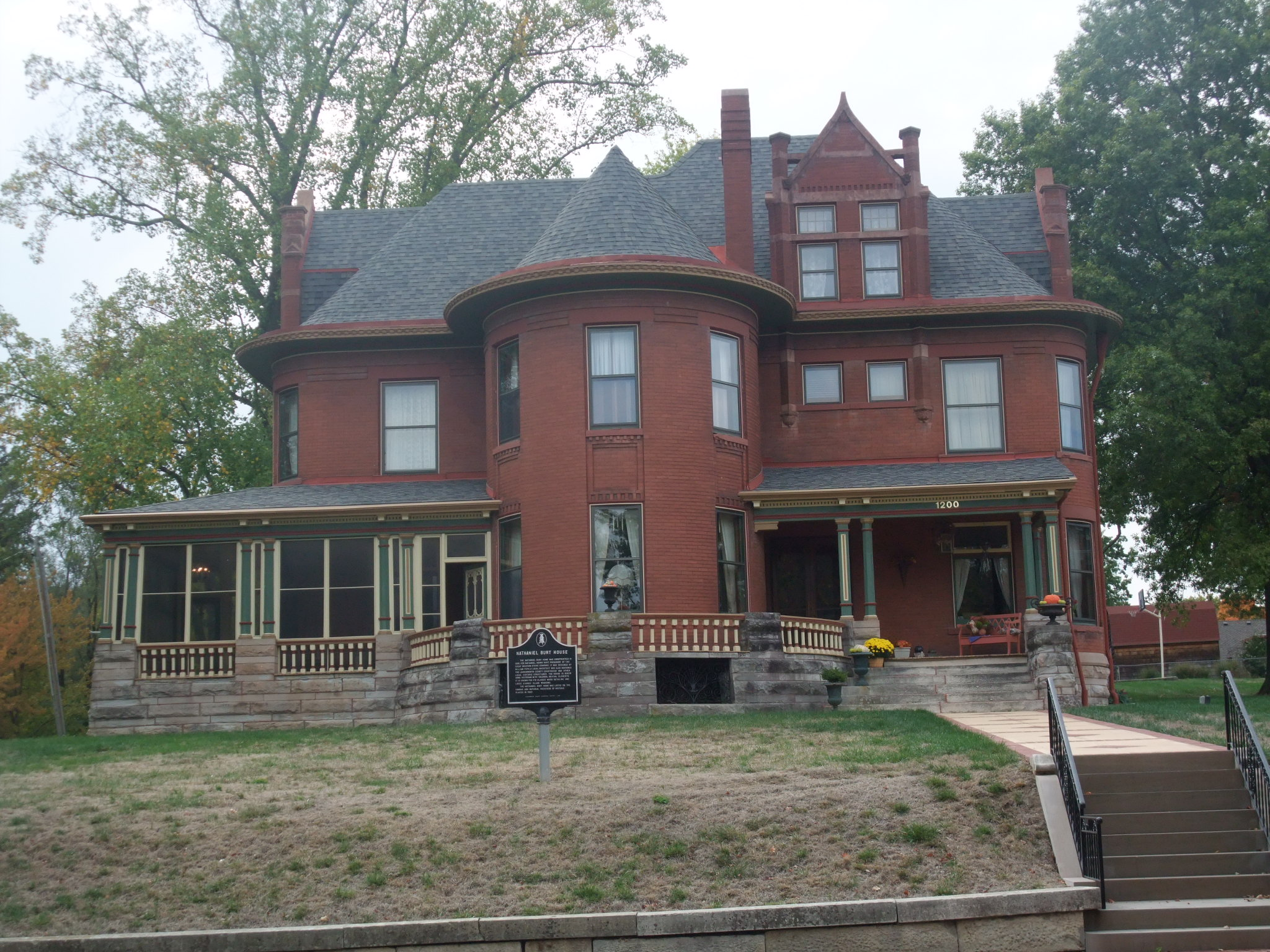

- Location within Kansas Location within the United States
- Location: 400 Fifth Avenue, Leavenworth, Kansas
- Coordinates: 39°18′20″N 94°54′55″W
- Area: less than one acre
- Built: 1895
- Architect: Feth, William P.
- Architectural style: Romanesque
- NRHP reference No.: 87001105
- Added to NRHP: October 27, 1987

The Nathaniel H. Burt House is a historic house located at 400 Fifth Avenue in Leavenworth, Kansas. It was listed on the National Register of Historic Places on October 27, 1987.

Source of information about the Burt children and Carroll Mansion Museum is from the Leavenworth County Historical Society at the Carroll Mansion Museum (next door to the Burt House), 1128 Fifth Avenue.

== Architectural design ==
Nathaniel H. Burt had become a prominent Leavenworth businessman by 1895 when he built the Nathaniel H. Burt House at 1200 Fifth Avenue for his wife and two sons. The architect was William Pratt Feth, a native of Leavenworth, who had just returned after several years of schooling at the Armour institute in Chicago and apprenticed work in Denver on the famed Dennis Sheedy Mansion. Mr. Feth remained in Leavenworth the rest of his life where there are over 60 public and residential structures to his credit. These include the County Courthouse, City Hall, the AXA Building, the Corner Pharmacy, and the former Montgomery Ward building, now known as J.W. Crancers. Mr. Feth designed the home in the Romanesque Revival style reminiscent of the work of H.H. Richardson. The overall irregular facades are typical of the late Victorian period. Using brick with limestone trim and foundation, the exterior is highly ornamented. Original blueprints of the approximately 54' by 65' structure are maintained by the current owners as well as Leavenworth Public Works. The carriage house, immediately behind the main building, was constructed in 1920, and reflects the style of the main house.

== Refurbishment and renovations ==
The home underwent an extensive interior refurbishment in the early 1980s under the oversight of both William and Annett McCollum as well as Leah S. Waage. Extensive use of the Bradbury and Bradbury Victorian Wallpaper Company have been integrated throughout the home. The extensive use of these wallcoverings were custom made for each room where they were installed. They portray the early The Victorian Era (1837-1901), which was a period of transformation. In the decorative arts, this vibrant era did not produce merely one style, it produced many. Historical revivals, an anti-industrial return to nature, futurism, and Oriental exoticism all coexisted in the public imagination, and were often found in enthusiastic, if not startling, decorative combinations. Additional notable interior features include the large stained glass window and fully functional curved radiator on the stairway, Oak, cherry, and bird's eye maple pocket doors, and the chandelier within the foyer. In its current configuration, the home has 5 bedrooms, 3 ½ baths, and three separate levels.

== The Burt family and ownership ==
In 1876 Nathaniel Henry Burt married Rosamond O. Pratt. She was born at the Baptist Indian Mission, south of Leavenworth, March 26, 1854, the daughter of missionaries, Rev. John Gill Pratt and his wife, Olivia E. Evans. They had come from Boston to the Shawnee Baptist Mission in Johnson County in 1837, taking charge of the printing office of the Rev. Jotham Meeker. Children born to Nathaniel and Rosamond were Nathaniel Pratt (born 1877) and Eugene (born 1881). Nathaniel Pratt married Dorothy Gordon and inherited the house when his father died in 1923. After her husband's death in 1960, his wife sold the home in 1962 to Robert G. & Daphne M. Mundinger. There have been three subsequent families since then; Charles & Louise Moore, Robert & Audrey Wallis, and William & Annette McCollum, all prior to the current owners, Mr. and Mrs. Austin. Both Burt's sons were involved in the Great Western Stove Company and inherited their father's interests. Eugene and his wife Edith, daughter of Joseph & Sadie Cranston, who lived just up the street, had two daughters: Rosamond and Barbara. Rosamond married John Brock Taylor, who was affiliated with the First National Bank. Nathaniel P. Burt donated a good number of the Burt family early day furnishings to the Carroll Mansion Museum, which date from around 1900. The famous "Keller Dog" that stands on the front lawn of the museum was donated by Rosamond Burt Taylor. The Everhard Glass Plate Negative Collection, owned by the museum, includes numerous portraits of the Burt family. Its original owner, Nathaniel H. Burt, moved to Leavenworth in 1875 and started working for the Great Western Stove Company. He became the treasurer of the company in 1885, then became its president in 1911. His house, built in 1895, was fitting for a prominent city businessman. The houses architect, William P. Feth, had recently returned to Leavenworth after architectural school and training in Chicago, from 1885 through 1890, and more training in Denver from 1890 through 1895. The design of the house is influenced by Henry Hobson Richardson elements, such as its material, form, and overall feeling. Some influence of Richard Morris Hunt's architecture is reflected in the ornamented dormers and an oriel window.

== Register ==
In October 1987, the Burt house was listed on the National Register of Historic Places for its significance as the residence of one of the cities early & influential industrial families. It was also awarded a historical plaque by the Leavenworth County Historical Society in May 1997.
