= William Pratt Feth =

American architect

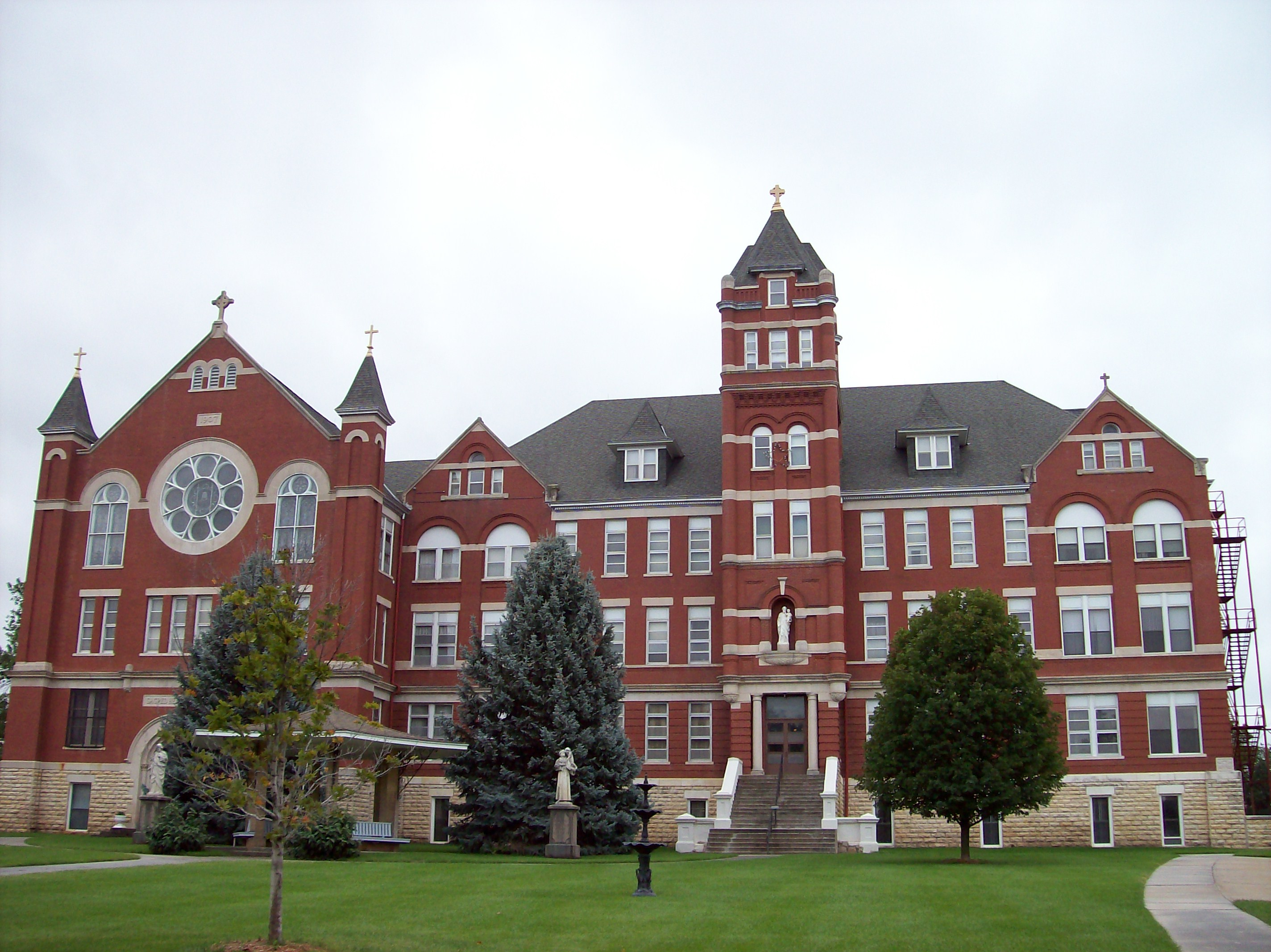
Nazareth Convent and Academy

William Pratt Feth (1866–1959) and Myron K. Feth were architects in Kansas. A number of their works are listed on the U.S. National Register of Historic Places.

The Nathaniel H. Burt House by William P. Feth is significant both for its association with the Burt family, an "industrial family", and also for its association with architect Feth, "who designed the dwelling incorporating characteristics of two American architects of the period, H. H. Richardson and Richard Morris Hunt."

Works include (with attribution):

- AXA Building, (built 1905), 205 S. 5th St. Leavenworth, Kansas (Feth, William B.), NRHP-listed
- Nathaniel H. Burt House, 400 Fifth Ave. Leavenworth, Kansas (Feth, William P.), NRHP-listed
- First Presbyterian Church, Leavenworth, 407 Walnut St. Leavenworth, Kansas (Feth, William Pratt), NRHP-listed
- Leavenworth County Courthouse, 300 Walnut St. Leavenworth, Kansas (Feth, William), NRHP-listed
- Nazareth Convent and Academy, 13th and Washington Sts. Concordia, Kansas (Feth, William P.), NRHP-listed
- One or more works in Arch Street Historic District, roughly bounded by Arch, Pine, S. Second and S. Third Sts. Leavenworth, KS (Feth, William Pratt), NRHP-listed
- One or more works in North Broadway Historic District, along N. Broadway bet. Seneca and Ottawa Sts. Leavenworth, Kansas (Feth, William Pratt), NRHP-listed
- One or more works in South Esplanade Historic District, roughly bounded by Arch, Olive and S. Second Sts and RR Leavenworth, Kansas (Feth, Myron K.), NRHP-listed
- One or more works in Third Avenue Historic District, roughly bounded by 2nd and Aves. and Congress and Middle Sts Leavenworth, Kansas (Feth, Myron K.), NRHP-listed
- One or more works in Union Park Historic District, roughly bounded by Chestnut, Congress, S. 6th and W. 7th Sts. Leavenworth, Kansas (Feth, William Pratt), NRHP-listed
