= AXA Building =

- U.S. National Register of Historic Places
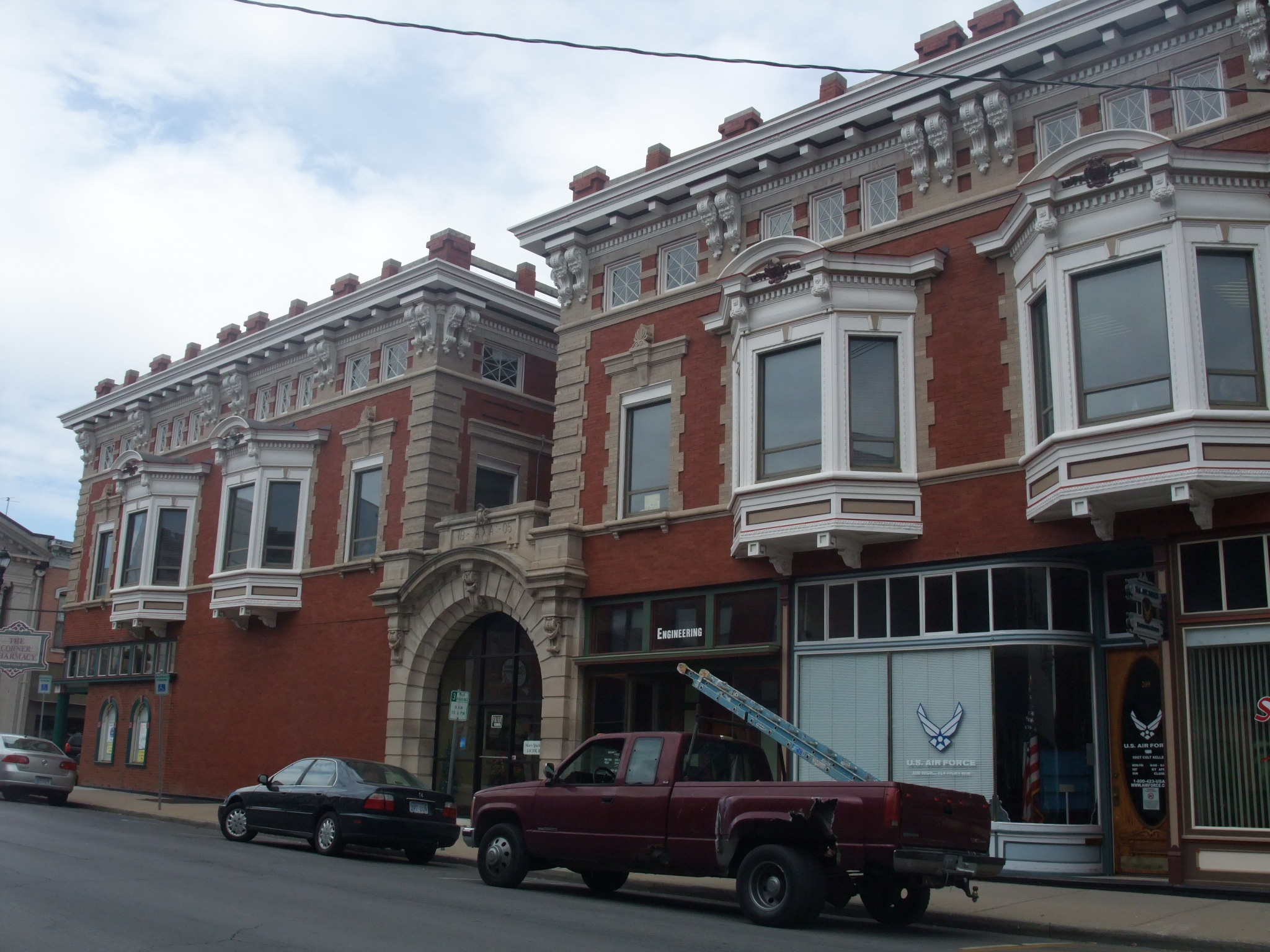

- Location within Kansas
- Location: 205 S. 5th St., Leavenworth, Kansas
- Coordinates: 39.31772°N 94.91507°W
- Area: 1 acre (0.40 ha)
- Built: 1905
- Built by: R.B. Yoakum
- Architect: William B. Feth
- Architectural style: Late Victorian
- NRHP reference No.: 72000509
- Added to NRHP: March 17, 1972

The AXA Building, at 205 S. 5th St. in Leavenworth, Kansas, was built in 1905. It was listed on the National Register of Historic Places in 1972.

It is an ornate and two-and-a-half story red brick commercial building, with a 125 feet (38 m) facade along Fifth Street.

It was designed by Leavenworth architect William B. Feth and built by contractor R. B. Yoakum. Known originally as the Eppenscheid Building. it was built for Charles Espenscheid, a St. Louis investor.

It is Late Victorian in style.

According to a guide to Kansas architecture, the building "stands out among its neighbors because of the inventiveness of its highly articulated Neo-classical ornament, particularly along the cornice, at its second-story bay windows, and around the lobby entry."
