= Western Branch, National Home for Disabled Volunteer Soldiers =

- U.S. National Register of Historic Places
- U.S. National Historic Landmark District
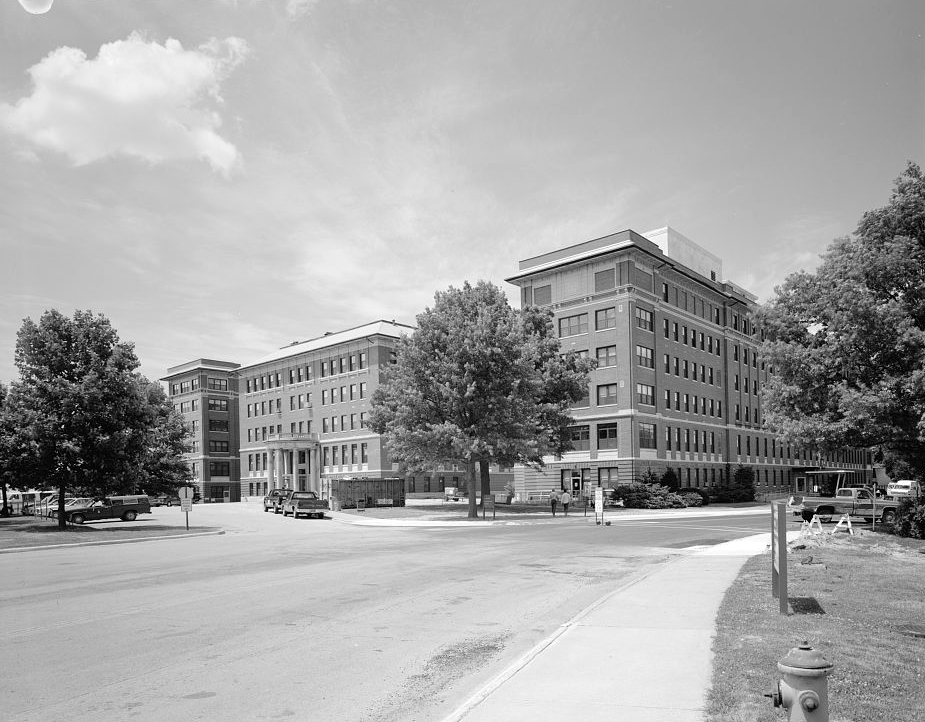
- The main hospital building

- Location within Kansas Location within the United States
- Location: US 73, Leavenworth, Kansas
- Area: 214 acres (87 ha)
- Built: 1885
- Architect: McGonigle, James A.; Curtiss, Louis, et al.
- Architectural style: Colonial Revival, Queen Anne, et al.
- NRHP reference No.: 99000456

Significant dates
- Added to NRHP: April 30, 1999
- Designated NHLD: June 17, 2011

The Western Branch of the National Home for Disabled Soldiers was established in 1885 in Leavenworth, Kansas to house aging veterans of the American Civil War. The 214-acre (87 ha) campus (formerly 640 acres (260 ha)) is near Fort Leavenworth, and is directly adjacent to Leavenworth National Cemetery, south of Leavenworth town. The home features about 82 contributing building resources, constructed between the 1880s and the 1940s. It is now part of the Department of Veterans Affairs Eisenhower Medical Center.

== Site ==
Initial construction focused on barracks-style accommodations, ornamented with a bandstand and a lake. During the 1930s a new hospital complex was built, with more barracks and a nurse's residence. Landscape architect H.W.S. Cleveland laid out the site plan, using the north–south ridge as an organizing feature. The Domiciliary Buildings are arranged perpendicular to the ridge, in a Georgian Colonial Revival style. As the site developed, functions migrated south to the area of the 1930s hospital building. Service and residential areas were located to the east of the main complex.

== Buildings ==
No architect has been identified for design attribution in the early phase of construction. Building work was carried out by James A. McGonigle. Typical design features include brick construction with limestone accents, with sandstone and terra cotta details. A few buildings were built of stone, particularly service buildings and the entrance complex. Most buildings are one and two stories. The main hospital rises between four and six stories, and the now-demolished old hospital was three stories in height. Roofs are typically pitched gables and hips. Many buildings have porches. The staff residences are mainly in Queen Anne style. Romanesque Revival architecture appears in Franklin Hall, while the Ward Memorial Building is an elaborate Queen Anne structure. The Chapel of the Veterans, by Louis Curtiss of Curtiss & Gunn, is a late Gothic Revival building, and the recreation hall incorporates both Gothic and Romanesque elements. Later structures are more sober, in Classical Revival or Georgian styles.

Significant buildings that have been demolished include the original hospital, a large domiciliary building, a stable and a combination hotel and theater. All of the agricultural buildings have been demolished but one.

The facility was placed on the National Register of Historic Places on April 30, 1999, and was designated a National Historic Landmark in 2011.
