= Kenneth A. Spencer =

American coal miner and philanthropist (1902–1960)

Kenneth Aldred Spencer
- Born: January 25, 1902; Columbus, Kansas, U.S.
- Died: February 19, 1960 (aged 58); Miami Beach, Florida, U.S.
- Burial place: Forest Hill Calvary Cemetery; Kansas City, Missouri, U.S.
- Education: University of Kansas
- Occupations: Coal miner; philanthropist

Kenneth Aldred Spencer (January 25, 1902 – February 19, 1960) was a Kansas coal mine owner who transformed a government surplus factory into the world's biggest ammonium nitrate producer. His estate and his wife's estate donated to philanthropies throughout Kansas.

== Early life ==
Spencer was born in Columbus, Kansas but grew up in Pittsburg, Kansas.

Spencer graduated from the University of Kansas in 1926, majoring in engineering and geology and went into his father's business of Pittsburg & Midway Coal Company in Pittsburg, Kansas. Spencer moved to the Kansas City area in 1939 to establish offices for his companies.

== Career ==
As a trained geologist and engineer Spencer patented processes for extracting by-products from coal which led to the establishment of the Mineral Products Company of Pittsburg.

In 1941 the War Department contacted him about operating a weapons-grade ammonium nitrate plant near Crestline, Kansas that would become the Jayhawk Ordnance Works. He would say later:

"They wanted us to build and operate a big basic chemical plant. I didn't know about operating such a plant, but they told us anyone who could operate an electric shovel, move 30 or 40 feet of overburden to get an 18-inch seam of coal, and make it pay, could operate anything."

He set up the Military Chemical Works, Inc. as a subsidiary of Pittsburg & Midway with himself as president and built the plant by 1943 with it producing 14,500 tons a month.

U.S. ordnance facilities were placed in the mid-U.S. during World War II. Other plants to be built and owned by others included the Kansas Ordnance Plant at Parsons, Kansas, the Sunflower Ordnance Plant at De Soto, Kansas, the Ozark Ordnance Plant at El Dorado, Arkansas.

After the war with help from J.H. Whitney & Company he entered into a lease with an option to buy (which he did in 1948) the plant to use the ammonium nitrate as fertilizer under the new name of Spencer Chemical. He succeeded his father as head of the Pittsburg & Midway. It was so successful that he was able to endow a foundation by 1949.

Spencer would also buy plants in Calumet City, Illinois; Henderson, Kentucky; Vicksburg, Mississippi; Fort Worth, Texas and Orange, Texas.

Spencer was one of the nine original founders of MRIGlobal (formerly Midwest Research Institute) in 1944. Its first mission was finding peaceful uses of ammonium nitrate. He would be chairman of the board of trustees from 1954 to 1957. Spencer also donated money for the Kenneth A. Spencer Laboratories Building and the Spencer Auditorium at MRIGlobal.

Following the success of the Spencer Chemical Company, Spencer and his wife Helen formed the Kenneth A. and Helen F. Spencer Foundation in 1949. When Kenneth died in 1960, Helen liquidated their companies by selling them to Gulf Oil. She kept their various oil and gas leases in Kansas, Oklahoma, and Texas. In 1972 she decided to finally sell the oil and gas leases to Rex D. Archer, an employee that Kenneth had hired in 1955 to find these leases. Such loyalty, a Spencer family trait, was reflected in Helen's further work as head of the Spencer Foundation until her death in 1982.

The Spencer Chemical Corporation name disappeared following its purchase by the Pittsburg and Midway Company, which continued to operate under that name until its eventual owner Chevron formally consolidated its mining operations under the Chevron Mining name.

== Personal life ==
Helen Elizabeth Foresman (November 8, 1902 – February 15, 1982) was born in Joplin, Missouri and grew up in Amarillo, Texas and spent high school in Pittsburg, Kansas where she married Kenneth Spencer on January 6, 1927. They moved to Kansas City, Missouri in 1940.

Spencer died on February 19, 1960, at St. Francis Hospital in Miami Beach, Florida. He was buried at Forest Hill Calvary Cemetery in Kansas City.
