= De Soto, Kansas =

- City
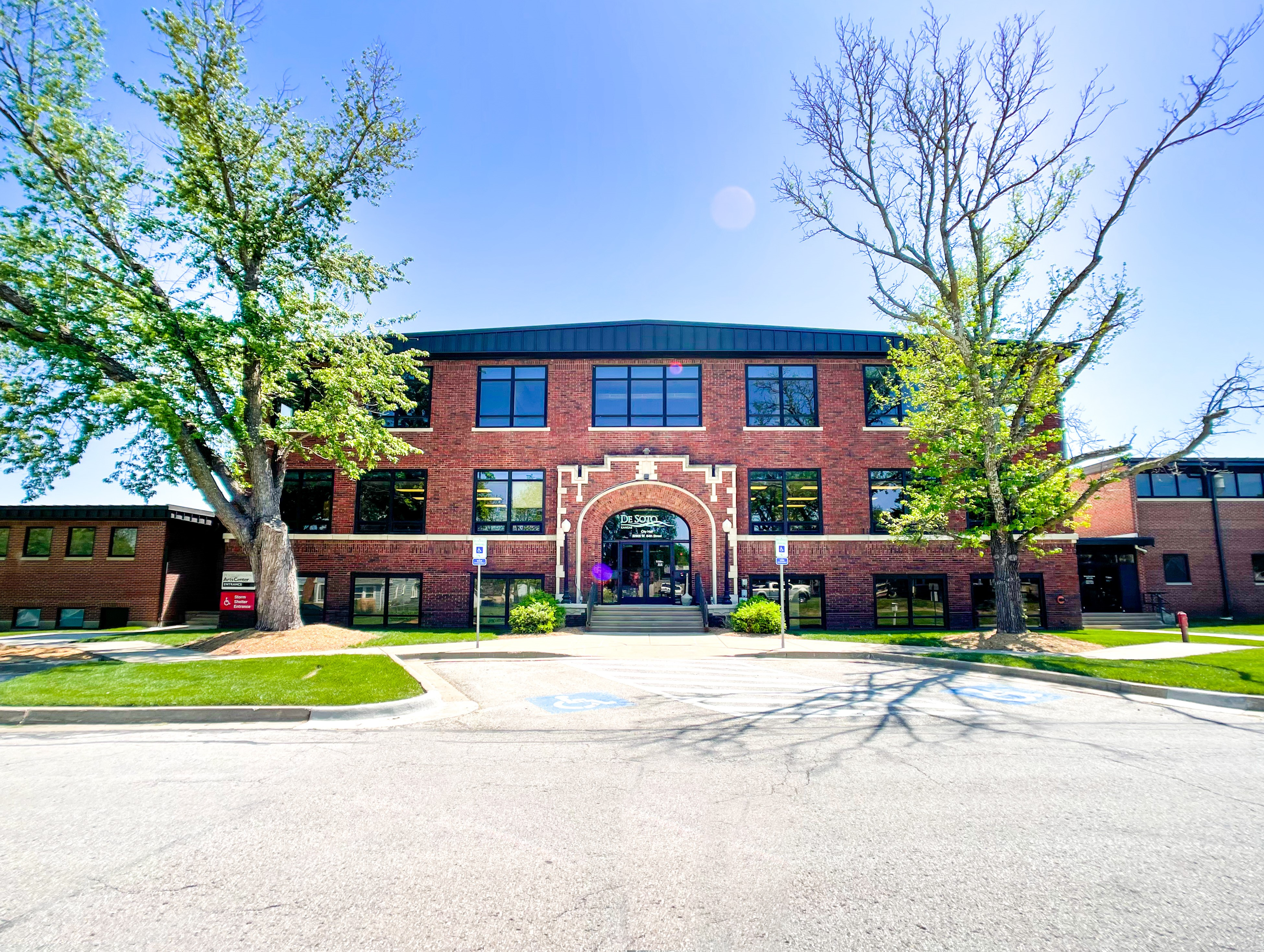
- De Soto City Hall (2022)

- Location within Johnson County and Kansas
- Interactive map of De Soto, Kansas
- Coordinates: 38°58′07″N 94°57′18″W
- Country: United States
- State: Kansas
- Counties: Johnson, Leavenworth
- Townships: Lexington, Sherman
- Founded: 1828
- Platted: 1857
- Incorporated: October 1, 1897
- Named for: Hernando de Soto

Government
  - Type: Mayor–Council
  - Mayor: Rick Walker

Area
  - Total: 11.28 sq mi (29.22 km^{2})
  - Land: 11.15 sq mi (28.89 km^{2})
  - Water: 0.13 sq mi (0.33 km^{2})
- Elevation: 853 ft (260 m)

Population (2020)
  - Total: 6,118
  - Estimate (2025): 7,083
  - Density: 548.5/sq mi (211.8/km^{2})
- Time zone: UTC-6 (CST)
  - Summer (DST): UTC-5 (CDT)
- ZIP Codes: 66018, 66019, 66025, 66061
- Area code: 913
- FIPS code: 20-17850
- GNIS ID: 485562
- Website: desotoks.us

De Soto /dəˈsoʊtoʊ/ is a city in Johnson and Leavenworth counties in the U.S. state of Kansas. As of the 2020 census, the population of the city was 6,118, and the 2025 estimate was 7,083. It is partially located along the Kansas River and part of the Kansas City Metropolitan Area.

== History ==
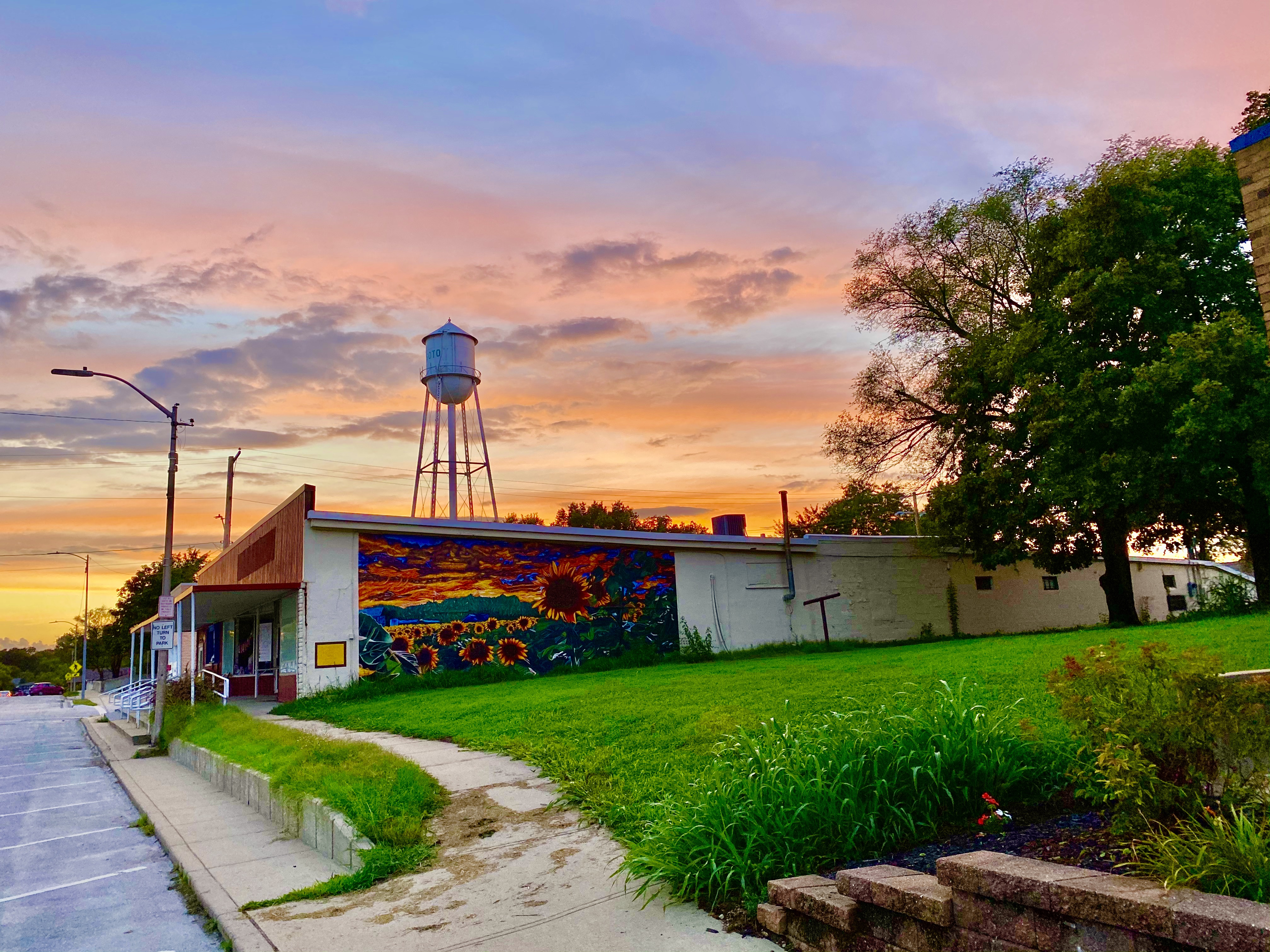
De Soto Water Tower & Sunflower Mural (2020)

The land that would become De Soto was part of a large territory extending to present-day St. Louis that was occupied by the Osage people, who were relocated from east of the Mississippi River in the upper Midwest. After the Treaty of St Louis in 1825, the Shawnee were forcibly relocated from Cape Girardeau to southeastern Kansas near the Neosho River. Only the Black Bob band of Shawnee resisted removal, however by 1828 they too migrated west and settled in northeastern Kansas in and around De Soto along the Kansas River. Later in the 19th century, many cultures of Native Americans arrived in the area after being pushed west by European-American pressure following colonial expansion and later the discovery of Gold in 1849. Between 1829 and 1854 almost thirty tribes were assigned reservations in what would become Kansas Territory. The Shawnee Methodist Mission was built in the De Soto area to minister to the tribe. A reserve was established in Kansas and soon other Shawnee from as far east as Ohio would join the reservation. The Agency of the Shawnee Indians, also known as Lexington, was located on the southern edge of the city.

The city of De Soto was platted in the spring of 1857, named for sixteenth-century Spanish explorer Hernando de Soto. In 1858, John Possum, a Shawnee man, and Hattie Possum sold 80 acres (32 ha) to John F. Legate, S. Todd and Stratton and Williams for $1,200. The next sale was 80 acres to the De Soto Town Company in July 1861 for $1,176. Major James B. Abbot is remembered as one of the town's pioneer landowners and the builder of Abbot Hall. Today, Abbot Hall is one of two town museums. De Soto was incorporated as a city on October 1, 1897.

With the construction of the 9,080-acre (3,670 ha) Sunflower Army Ammunition Plant south of De Soto, the city's population boomed in the early 1940s during World War II. In May 1943, a Kansas City Star article reported "a town rapidly growing, with a population increase from 400 to 1,000 persons in under a year." This sudden overflow in population put a great strain on housing and other resources in the city; however, many original residents prospered during this time, buying property and starting new businesses. Production flowed steadily at the Sunflower Army Ammunition Plant until the plant went on standby in March 1948, with small-scale production following shortly after until its closure in 1993.

=== Clearview ===
In 1943, nearby Sunflower Village was built to house workers for nearby Sunflower Ordnance Works. The west side "Old Village" had 853 dwellings in 1943, and the east side "New Village" had 580 pre-fab units that was completed by 1945. Housing, a school and traffic were filled and overflowing. Highway 10, the main street, is now 83rd Street. As people came in, it was getting harder to find room and places to room, board, and to dwell in, to a point that people were living in the chicken house and sleeping under quilts on the ground where the current Scout House is sitting on Wea Street. It was so unbearable that rooms that were rented out "by the shift" that other people would bring in trailers and tents. In 1955, the housing units transferred to Sunflower Ordnance Worker (SOW), then sold to private buyers. In 1961, Sunflower was sold to Quick Way Homes and renamed as Clearview City. In 1998, Clearview City was annexed by the city of De Soto, boosting the city's population by 339 people.

=== 1951 flood ===
In mid-July 1951, heavy rains led to a great rise of water in the Kansas River and other surrounding areas of the central United States, known as the Great Flood of 1951. De Soto, along the south side of the river, was severely damaged. The river crest at De Soto was 42.3 feet (12.9 m), the highest recorded on the Kansas River during the flood. Most of the downtown area was completely flooded, with over 4 feet (1.2 m) of standing water in some places.

=== Recent growth ===
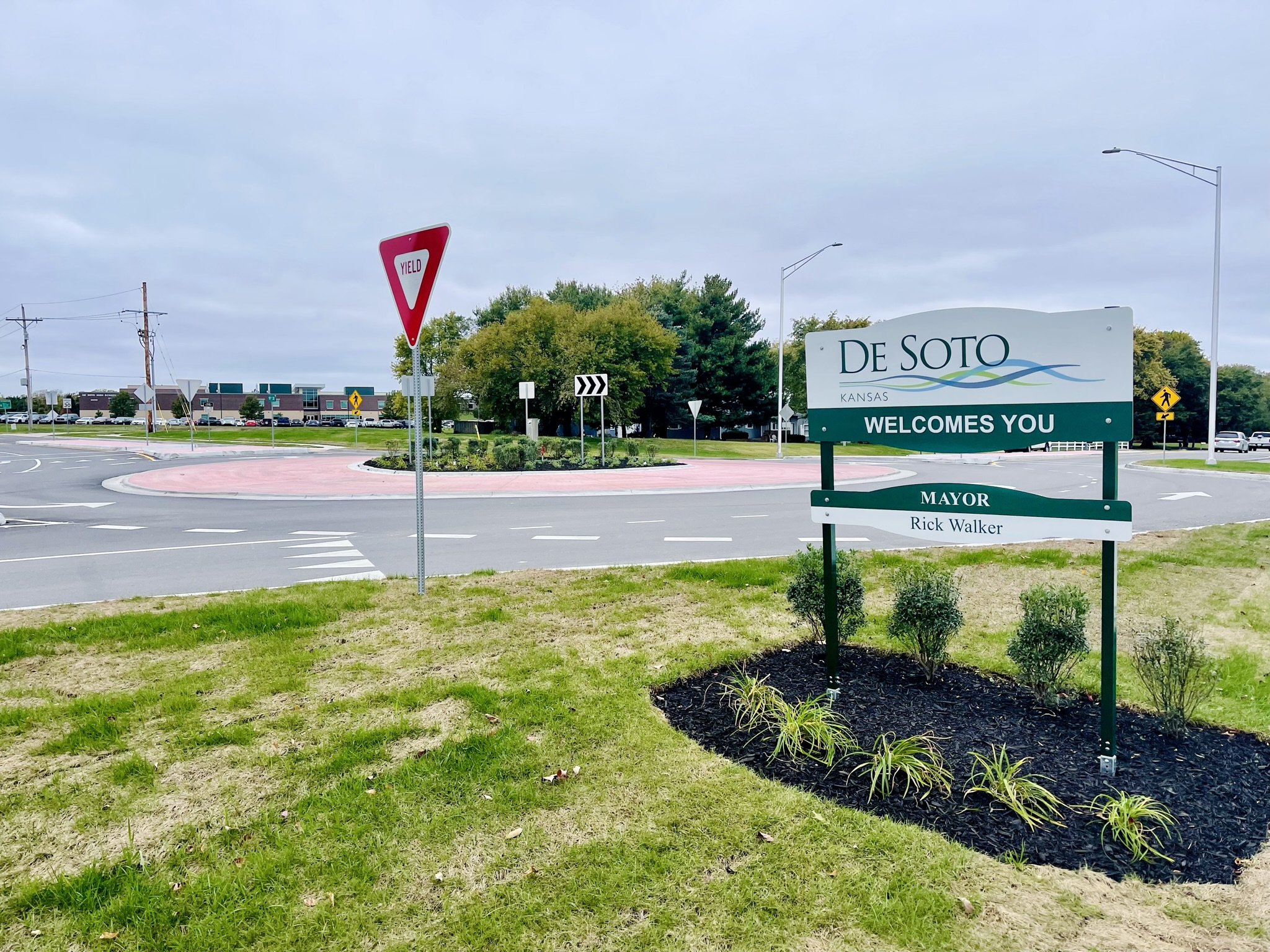
De Soto welcome sign, off K-10 highway (2020)

Since the 2008 recession came to an end, growth in De Soto has steadily picked up, with substantial commercial development in the K-10 Business District.

In 2019, the Kansas City Star reported that De Soto was, and is expected to remain the second fastest-growing city in the Kansas City metro area, trailing only Spring Hill.

After the closure of the Sunflower Army Ammunition Plant in 1993, plans for potential development of the 15.5 square-mile lot south of De Soto began to receive attention. After several abandoned proposals for large-scale developments and attractions, a master use plan was adopted by the authorities of Olathe, De Soto, Johnson County, and Sunflower Redevelopment Group. The master plan called for high density housing, major commercial zoning, a "downtown" area for offices, high density commercial and civic uses, and land promised to The University of Kansas, Kansas State University and the City of De Soto, as well as land being reserved for the army reserves, parks and other public spaces. However, slow cleanup and exhausted funding delayed the completion to 2038. In 2019, congressional lawmakers representing Kansas urged the Army to accelerate cleanup efforts of the land. Additional funding allocation and priority from the Army led to the announcement that the portions of the lot closest to De Soto would be ready for development by 2020.

In April 2021, unrelated to the development at the former ammunition plant site, Flint Logistics announced a proposal to construct a $500 million logistics center and high-density residential complex three miles west of De Soto, petitioning annexation of the property adjacent to the Johnson-Douglas County line.

In 2021, following extensive cleanup and decontamination of site, clearance for development was granted by the U.S. Army Corps of Engineers on the northernmost portion of the Sunflower Army Ammunition Plant. De Soto initiated annexation of 10 square miles, doubling the city's footprint. Shortly thereafter, De Soto established a short-term plan to improve roadway and utility access to the area, as well as establishing a TIF (tax increment financing) district, in an effort to encourage development of the largest remaining undeveloped plot of land in the region. Amidst wide speculation of a large-scale development potential on the site, in July 2022, Panasonic North America announced its intent to construct the company's first United States-based, and world's largest electric vehicle battery manufacturing facility. Panasonic's investment of over $4 billion into the site makes it the largest single private investment in Kansas' and Kansas City's history.

In October 2022, Sunflower Redevelopment Group initiated an agreement with De Soto, which included

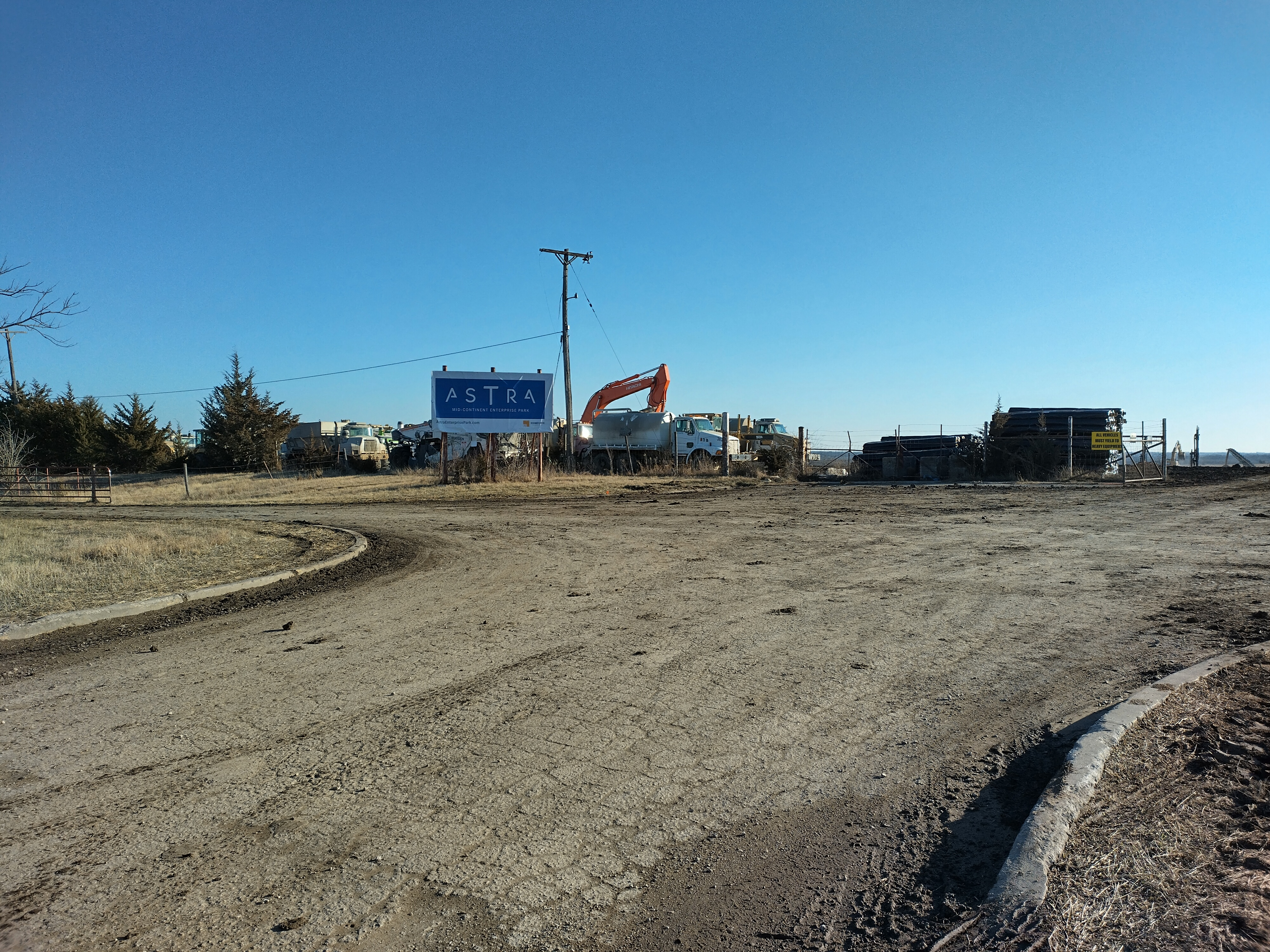
Construction after the Sunflower Plant was torn down

voluntary annexation of an additional 2,800 acres of the former ammunition plant, completing annexation of the entire 17 square mile property. The agreement was an amendment to the original from 2021, extending the existing TIF district into the most recently annexed portion, excluding a small portion outside of the De Soto USD 232, with most of the original stipulations left intact. The city avoided extending the TIF district into the portion of recently annexed land that lie within Gardner-Edgerton USD 231, fearing that school board would consider veto of the TIF agreement in its entirety, requiring the city to restart the agreement approval process. A part of the amended agreement is that should development not occur within the time frame, the city is not obligated to de-annex the property, as was the contingency with the original agreement. The annexation conflicted with a 1989 boundary agreement with Gardner, however a 2022 ruling by the Kansas Supreme Court on a case between Olathe and Spring Hill set a precedent, rendering the original annexation agreement unenforceable by Gardner.

In November 2022, Sunflower Redevelopment Group renamed the site of the former ammunition plant to Astra Enterprise Park.

== Geography ==
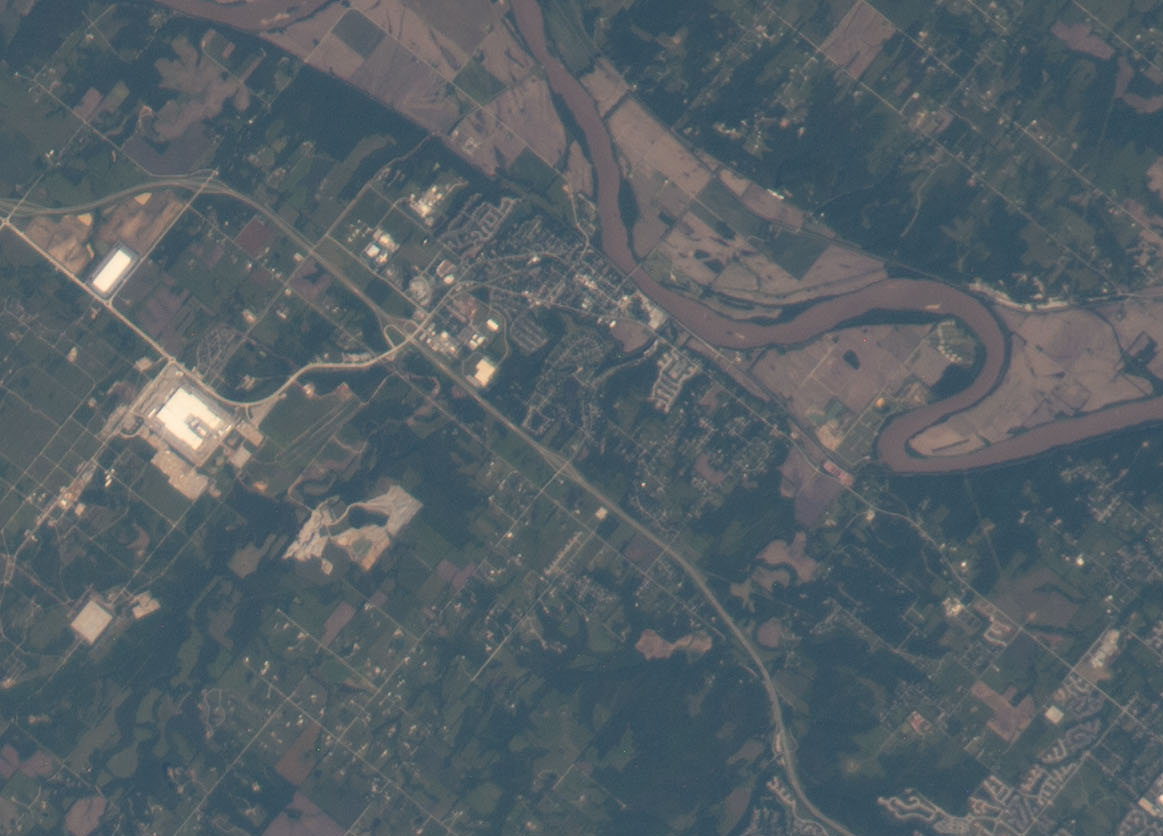
Space view from ISS Expedition 73 (June 2025)

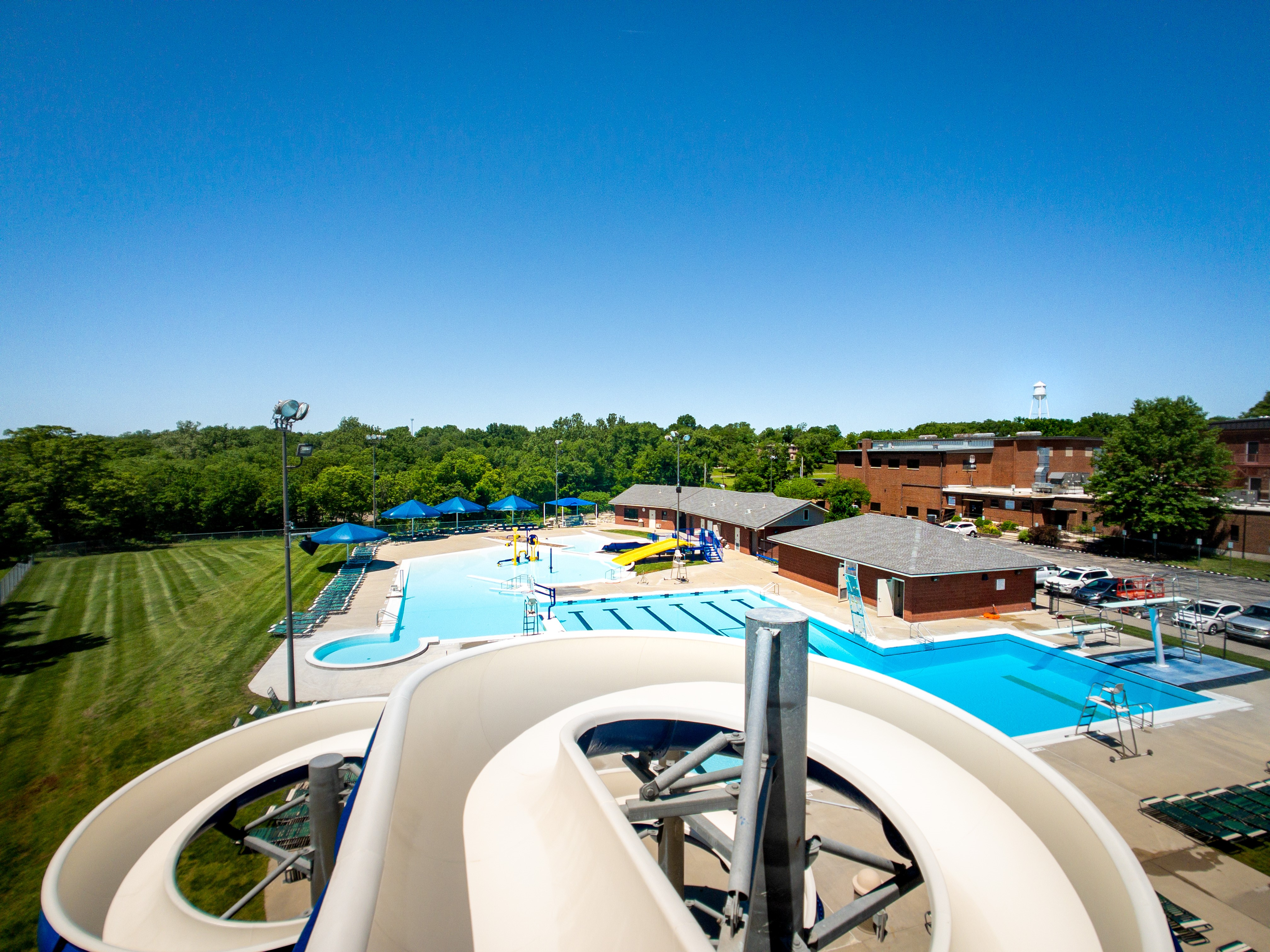
De Soto Aquatic Center (2022)

According to the United States Census Bureau, the city has a total area of 11.20 square miles (29.00 km^{2}), of which 11.07 square miles (28.67 km^{2}) are land and 0.13 square miles (0.33 km^{2}), or 1.15%, are water. While the majority of De Soto is located in northwestern Johnson County at 38°58′45″N 94°58′7″W (38.9791709, -94.9685783), the golf course north of the Kansas River is located in southern Leavenworth County. De Soto mainly lies south of the Kansas River, the only city in Johnson County originally platted around the river. Four of the river's tributaries, Captain Creek, Kill Creek, Cedar Creek, Camp Creek end within the city limits.

Considered by many locals to be an exurb, rather than a suburb, De Soto is part of the Kansas City metropolitan area, and it borders other communities on the eastern edges. These include Shawnee to the northeast, Lenexa to the east, and Olathe to the southeast.

De Soto currently has annexation agreements with Olathe and Gardner, guaranteeing De Soto will be able to annex as far south as 127th Street and as far east as meeting Olathe at its western boundary. However, a 2022 Kansas Supreme Court ruling on a disagreement between Spring Hill and Olathe nullified most boundary agreements between Johnson County cities. Subsequently, in October 2022, De Soto initiated annexation of 2,800 acres south of the formerly agreed southernmost boundary with Gardner, at the behest of Sunflower Redevelopment Group, which the city argued took precedence since it was a voluntary annexation request.

== Demographics ==
Historical population
Census	Pop.	Note	%±
1860	35		—
1870	102		191.4%
1880	141		38.2%
1890	223		58.2%
1900	226		1.3%
1910	240		6.2%
1920	255		6.3%
1930	384		50.6%
1940	383		−0.3%
1950	518		35.2%
1960	1,271		145.4%
1970	1,839		44.7%
1980	2,061		12.1%
1990	2,291		11.2%
2000	4,561		99.1%
2010	5,720		25.4%
2020	6,118		7.0%
2025 (est.)	7,083		15.8%
U.S. Decennial Census; 2010-2020

=== Racial and ethnic composition ===
De Soto city, Kansas – Racial and ethnic composition Note: the US Census treats Hispanic/Latino as an ethnic category. This table excludes Latinos from the racial categories and assigns them to a separate category. Hispanics/Latinos may be of any race.
Race / Ethnicity (NH = Non-Hispanic)	Pop 2000	Pop 2010	Pop 2020	% 2000	% 2010	% 2020
White alone (NH)	4,099	4,670	4,649	89.87%	81.64%	75.99%
Black or African American alone (NH)	9	43	48	0.20%	0.75%	0.78%
Native American or Alaska Native alone (NH)	41	41	38	0.90%	0.72%	0.62%
Asian alone (NH)	17	25	36	0.37%	0.44%	0.59%
Native Hawaiian or Pacific Islander alone (NH)	3	0	0	0.07%	0.00%	0.00%
Other race alone (NH)	2	3	15	0.04%	0.05%	0.25%
Mixed race or Multiracial (NH)	77	102	297	1.69%	1.78%	4.85%
Hispanic or Latino (any race)	313	836	1,035	6.86%	14.62%	16.92%
Total	4,561	5,720	6,118	100.00%	100.00%	100.00%

=== 2020 census ===
As of the 2020 census, De Soto had a population of 6,118, with 2,295 households and 1,635 families. The population density was 543.6 inhabitants per square mile (209.9/km^{2}). There were 2,462 housing units at an average density of 218.7 per square mile (84.5/km^{2}).

The median age was 39.4 years. 24.1% of residents were under the age of 18, 8.9% were from 18 to 24, 23.7% were from 25 to 44, 28.3% were from 45 to 64, and 15.0% were 65 years of age or older. For every 100 females, there were 99.3 males, and for every 100 females age 18 and over there were 95.9 males age 18 and over.

0.0% of residents lived in urban areas, while 100.0% lived in rural areas.

Of the 2,295 households, 35.4% had children under the age of 18 living in them. Of all households, 57.2% were married-couple households, 15.3% were households with a male householder and no spouse or partner present, and 21.9% were households with a female householder and no spouse or partner present. About 23.1% of all households were made up of individuals, and 9.9% had someone living alone who was 65 years of age or older. The average household size was 2.8 and the average family size was 3.4.

Of the 2,462 housing units, 6.8% were vacant. The homeowner vacancy rate was 2.0% and the rental vacancy rate was 9.7%.

Racial composition as of the 2020 census
Race	Number	Percent
White	4,887	79.9%
Black or African American	56	0.9%
American Indian and Alaska Native	61	1.0%
Asian	41	0.7%
Native Hawaiian and Other Pacific Islander	0	0.0%
Some other race	439	7.2%
Two or more races	634	10.4%

Non-Hispanic White residents made up 75.99% of the population.

=== Demographic estimates ===
The percent of residents with a bachelor's degree or higher was estimated to be 22.4% of the population.

=== Income and poverty ===
The 2016–2020 5-year American Community Survey estimates show that the median household income was $60,568 (with a margin of error of +/- $23,498) and the median family income was $88,000 (+/- $30,645). Males had a median income of $53,722 (+/- $24,926) versus $25,460 (+/- $9,855) for females. The median income for those above 16 years old was $33,971 (+/- $8,262). Approximately, 3.2% of families and 4.6% of the population were below the poverty line, including 4.0% of those under the age of 18 and 8.4% of those ages 65 or over.

=== 2010 census ===
As of the census of 2010, there were 5,720 people, 2,007 households, and 1,523 families residing in the city. The population density was 516.7 inhabitants per square mile (199.5/km^{2}). There were 2,204 housing units at an average density of 199.1 per square mile (76.9/km^{2}). The racial makeup of the city was 89.7% White, 0.8% African American, 0.8% Native American, 0.4% Asian, 5.9% from other races, and 2.3% from two or more races. Hispanic or Latino of any race were 14.6% of the population.

There were 2,007 households, of which 41.5% had children under the age of 18 living with them, 60.4% were married couples living together, 10.5% had a female householder with no husband present, 5.0% had a male householder with no wife present, and 24.1% were non-families. 19.0% of all households were made up of individuals, and 6.3% had someone living alone who was 65 years of age or older. The average household size was 2.83 and the average family size was 3.25.

The median age in the city was 35.4 years. 28.6% of residents were under the age of 18; 8.8% were between the ages of 18 and 24; 26.5% were from 25 to 44; 26.3% were from 45 to 64; and 9.9% were 65 years of age or older. The gender makeup of the city was 50.2% male and 49.8% female.

== Economy ==
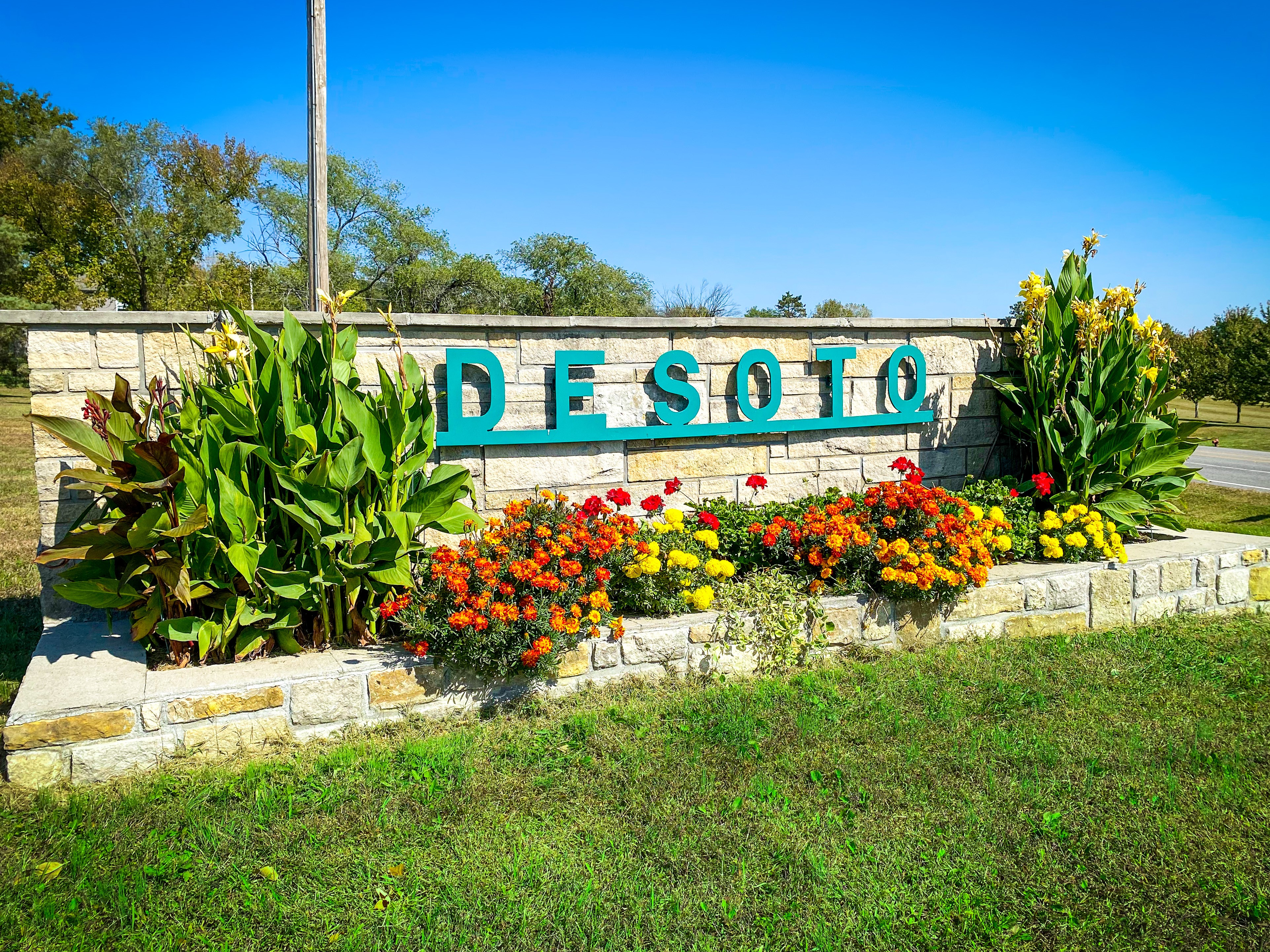
West Wye signage (2022)

Two local corporations, Great American Bank and Custom Foods, Inc., and one national corporation, Goodcents Deli Fresh Subs, are headquartered in De Soto. Huhtamaki Americas, Inc. and Engineered Air, two international enterprises, chose De Soto for their North American headquarters. In addition, Merck Animal Health, one of the world's leading manufacturers of animal health supplies, selected De Soto for one of its four U.S. manufacturing facilities. Rehrig Pacific, a plastics manufacturer, chose De Soto to house their Midwestern U.S. operations. In 2019, Biodesix, a life sciences diagnostics solutions company, opened a clinical testing laboratory for its lung nodule risk assessment tests in De Soto.

=== Panasonic ===
In 2021, following extensive cleanup and decontamination of site, clearance for development was granted by the U.S. Army Corps of Engineers on the northernmost portion of the Sunflower Army Ammunition Plant. De Soto initiated annexation of 6,376 acres, increasing the city's footprint from 7,400 acres to 13,776 acres, nearly doubling in size. Shortly thereafter, De Soto established a short-term plan to improve roadway and utility access to the area, as well as establishing a TIF (tax increment financing) district, in an effort to encourage development of the largest remaining undeveloped plot of land in the region.

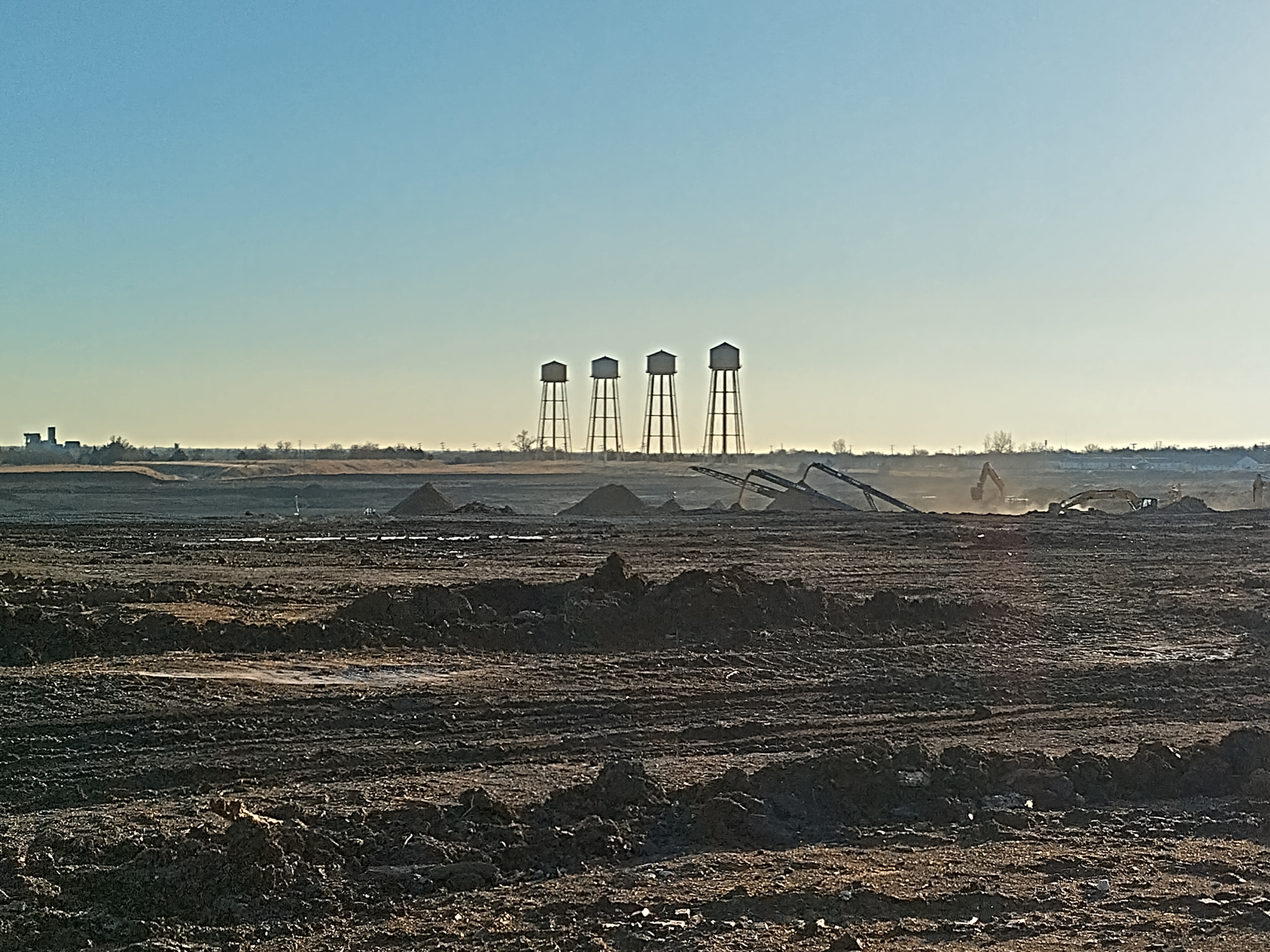
Digging in front of the Sunflower Plant, site of the Panasonic Battery Plant.

In early 2022, the Kansas legislature passed a bill, referred to as APEX, signed by Governor Laura Kelly, providing $800 million in tax breaks and incentives on a proposed $4 billion project by a company whose identity was concealed by a non-disclosure agreement between the two parties. It was believed that this project was to either be developed in De Soto, or Pryor Creek, Oklahoma, due to the extensive amount of land that was expected to be required.

On July 13, 2022, state officials announced during a press conference that Panasonic was the company in question, and had selected De Soto for its planned $4 billion electric-vehicle battery manufacturing facility, to be constructed on the northernmost portion of the former Sunflower Army Ammunition Plant. The facility is expected to provide 4,000 direct jobs, with an estimated 4,000 additional jobs by non-direct development related to the facility, and 16,000 construction jobs. It is the largest, costliest single development in Kansas' history, and will be one of the largest private employers in the state once operational, which is expected to be in July, 2024.

=== Largest employers ===
As of January 2020, the largest employers in the city are:

#	Employer	# of Employees
1	De Soto School District	1,655
2	Engineered Air	870
3	Huhtamaki	640
4	Merck Animal Health	180
5	Rehrig Pacific	110
6	Custom Foods Inc	110
7	Goodcent's Deli Fresh Subs Headquarters	95
8	Hillside Village	86

== Arts and culture ==
Between 1999 and 2000, a barn that had originally been built in the 1880s was moved piece by piece from a farmstead and placed on the Zimmerman farm at the northwest corner of the Kill Creek Road and K-10 interchange. The barn was historically called the White-Waitmann barn but after its erection in 2000, by contractors and community volunteers, it also became known as the Zimmerman barn. The barn was not only a piece of American history, but it became well known throughout the community because the owner, Darrel Zimmerman, allows the public to pay a fee and use the barn for events such as weddings, graduations, and other meetings. However, a fierce storm demolished the barn in May 2010. The barn was rebuilt in 2013, after it was determined that Zimmerman could not locate another historic-looking barn to move on the location.

The Day After was filmed on K-10 in De Soto, signed in the film as I-70.

All Creatures Here Below is partially set in De Soto, but filmed in Kansas City.

In the science fiction novel The Calculating Stars, the Sunflower Army Ammunition Plant south of De Soto became the headquarters and primary spaceport of the International Aerospace Coalition due to its proximity to Kansas City, the new capital of the United States.

=== Events ===
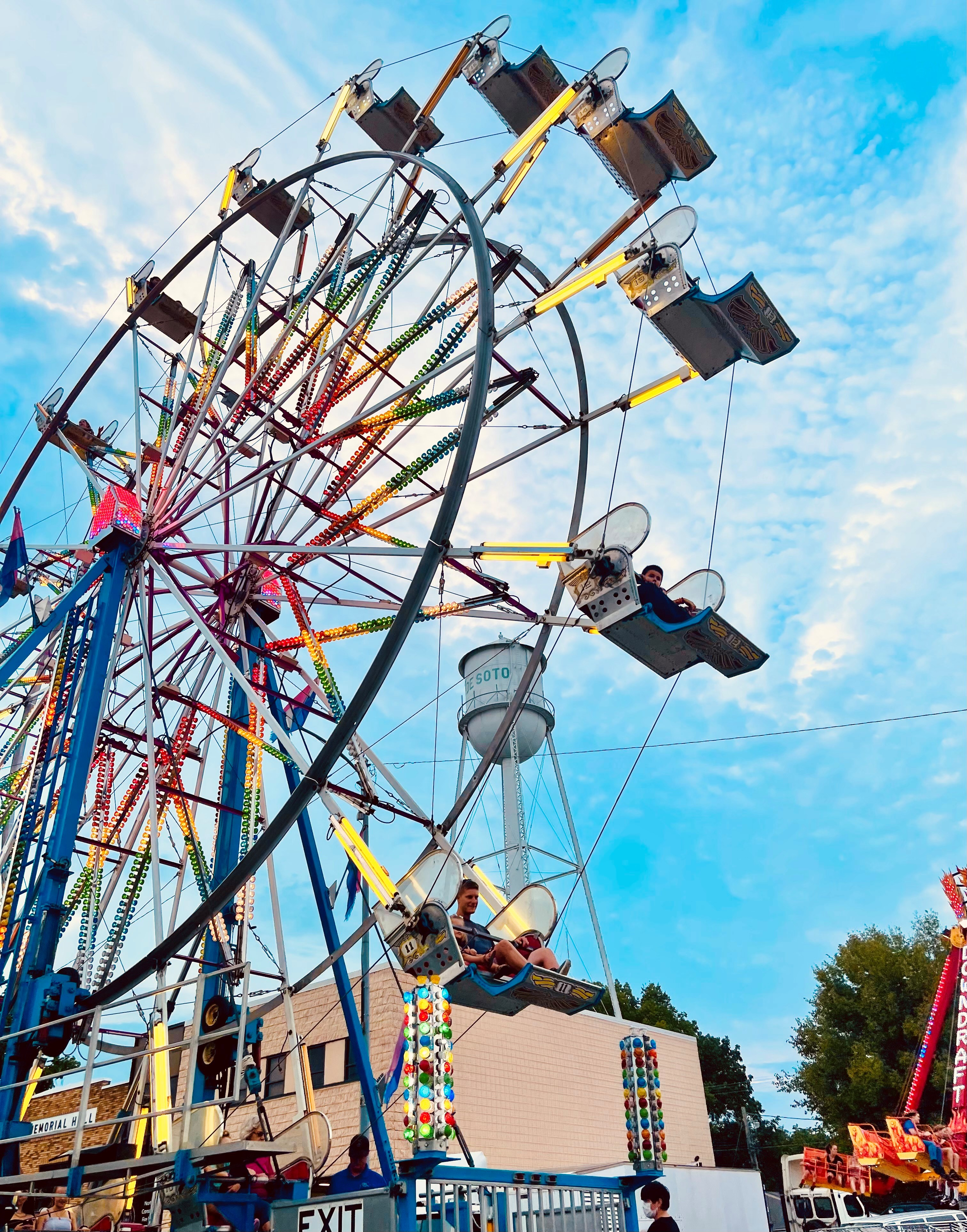
Annual De Soto Days Festival (2021)

De Soto Days Festival - This annual event begins on the Thursday before Labor Day and runs until the holiday itself, making it the third longest Labor Day festival in the county. The fair has booths and three stages, entertaining patrons annually on the 3 operating days.

Winesong at Riverfest - A cultural attraction which began in 2012, is a wine festival hosted by the De Soto Rotary Club annually in early June. The event features wineries from the Midwest, and includes samples, appetizers, music and art competitions.

== Government ==
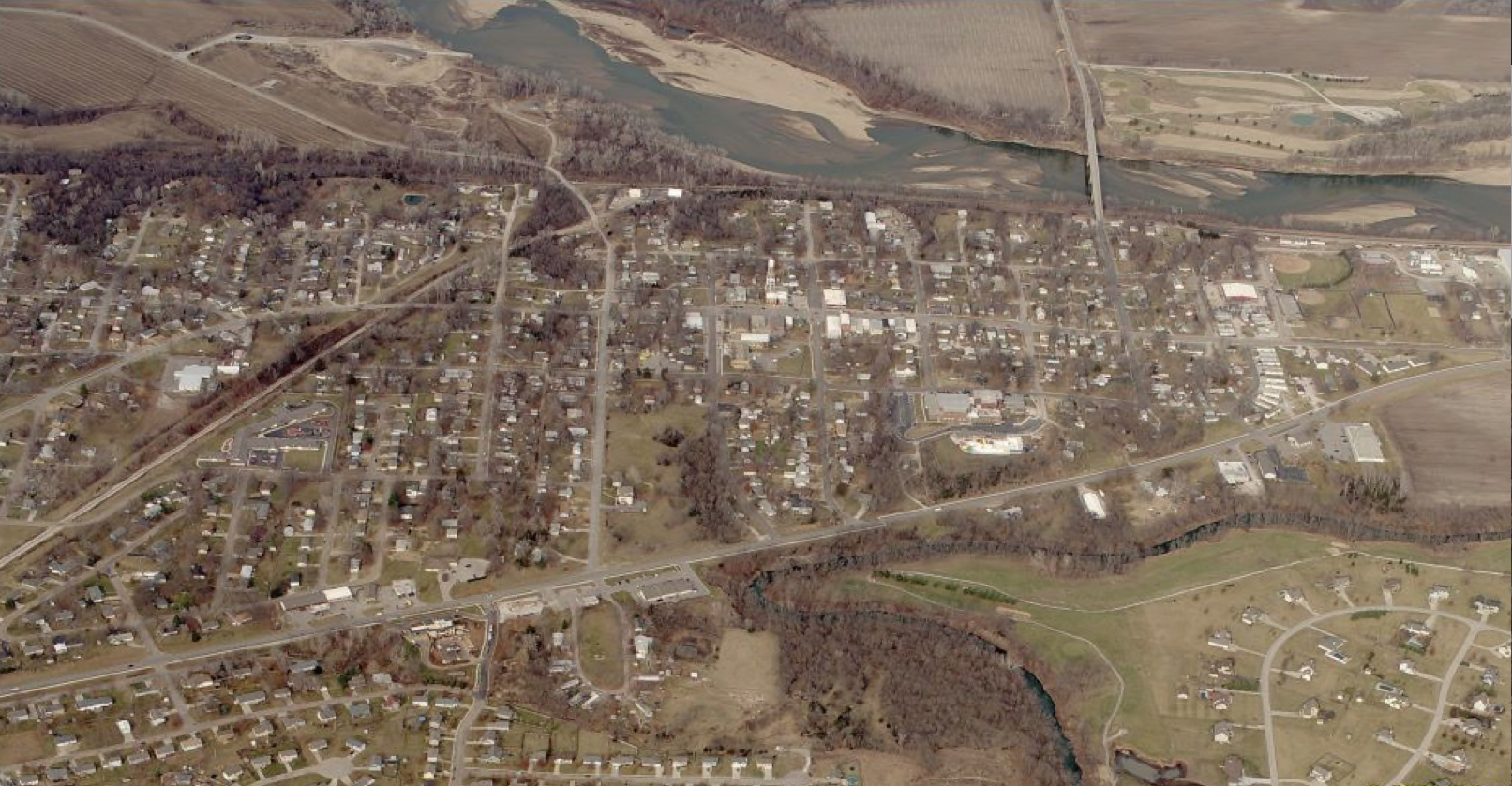
Aerial view of De Soto (2006)

De Soto is a Kansas city of the second-class. ZIP Codes that serve De Soto are 66018, 66019, 66025, and 66061.

The De Soto government consists of a mayor and five council members, with a council appointed president. The council meets the first and third Thursday of each month at 7:00 p.m and the planning commission meets on the fourth Tuesday of the month. The De Soto City Council is an At-Large Representation, meaning the council serve the entire city, at-large, versus a single designated portion per member. City Hall is located at 32905 West 84th Street.

=== 2016 mayoral recall ===
An effort to recall Mayor Tim Maniez and City Councilmember Bill McDaniel from their positions was launched in February 2016. Recall supporters submitted their petition applications against Maniez and McDaniel to the Johnson County Elections Board on February 18, 2016. Judy Macy and other De Soto residents filed petitions against Maniez and McDaniel due to concerns about meeting decorum. The petition against Maniez noted his lack of control over meetings, while the McDaniel's petition cited argumentative and negative behavior. Recall organizers also expressed frustration with the firing of city administrator Cynthia Wagner in February 2016. The matter was considered abandoned on November 7, 2017, when both parties were voted against additional terms.

== Education ==
DeSoto is served by De Soto USD 232 public school district, which has two high schools: De Soto High School (located in De Soto) and Mill Valley High School (located in Shawnee).

=== Library ===
The Johnson County Library System maintains the De Soto Downtown Library.

== Media ==
=== Newspapers ===
The De Soto Explorer was started in 1998 and served as De Soto's main news source for 14 years, until the closure of the printing facility and website in 2012. In the fall of 2015, Discovering De Soto magazine released its first preview edition. In 2017, the De Soto City Council motioned to fund issues of Discovering De Soto in order to distribute the magazine by mail and around local businesses. In 2018, the De Soto City Council once again motioned to fund upcoming issues of Discovering De Soto for the year.

The Kansas City Star and the Lawrence Journal-World both cover and deliver to De Soto.

== Transportation ==
Sunflower Army Ammunition Plant, located in De Soto (2005)

=== Road ===
De Soto is served by several highways:

- K-10 runs through most portions of southern De Soto. Four exits have a direct connection to De Soto.
  - Exit – Evening Star Road
  - Exit – Edgerton Road
  - Exit – Lexington Avenue, formerly K-285 (Decommissioned in 1999)
  - Exit – Kill Creek Road
- K-32 runs about 5 miles (8 km) north of De Soto. Two junctions have a direct connection to De Soto.
  - Junction – 189th Street CR 26(Leavenworth County)
  - Junction – 158th Street CR 2(Leavenworth County)
- US-24/ US-40 run concurrently about 7 miles (11 km) north of De Soto, in Leavenworth County. CR 2 provides a connection to De Soto.
- CR 2(Leavenworth County), crosses the Kansas River, providing Johnson County's only connection to Leavenworth County.
- CR 3(Leavenworth County)
- CR 26(Leavenworth County)
- CR 32(Leavenworth County)
- West 103rd Street / Lexington Avenue / West 83rd Street runs through De Soto. West 103rd Street enters De Soto as a rural arterial from Douglas County, runs adjacent to the Sunflower Army Ammunition Plant, and curves to run diagonally through the city as a minor arterial, signed as Lexington Avenue. Once exiting the main portion of De Soto, Lexington Avenue curves to run east–west again and is signed thereafter as West 83rd Street, providing a direct connection to Shawnee, Lenexa, Overland Park, and Kansas City. Originally designated as K-10 from 1926 to 1976, and as K-285 from 1976 to 1999.

=== Rail ===
De Soto was settled in 1828 as a city along the Kansas River. In 1857, the Atchison, Topeka, Santa Fe Railway constructed track through northern portions of town, parallel to the river. De Soto's train depot was constructed along a siding around 1860. In 1900, a railyard was constructed east of town to allow the switching of freight cars from Topeka to Kansas City. The yard consisted of seven rails along the main line and siding. Portions of the yard are still in use today to store unused freight cars. However, only three lines remain, as the others were removed to save on maintenance.

In 1942, during the construction of the Sunflower Army Ammunition Plant, the U.S. army constructed a spur through De Soto to connect the plant to a main rail line. To this day the spur is used for the industrial district shipments.

== Notable people ==
Notable individuals who were born in and/or have lived in De Soto include:

- Stanley Adams (1922–1999), U.S. Army Lieutenant Colonel, Medal of Honor Recipient
- Mandy Chick (born 2001), American stock car racer
- Howard Gloyd (1902–1978), herpetologist
- Greyson Jenista (born 1996), Atlanta Braves minor league right fielder
- Frank Lee (1873–1952), U.S. Representative from Missouri
- John Outland (1871–1941), American football player and coach; namesake of the Outland Trophy
- Kenneth Spencer (1902–1960), coal mine owner and philanthropist
