= Military building =

Structure designed to house functions performed by a military unit

A military building is any structure designed to house functions performed by a military unit. General types include:

- Administrative Facilities
- Ammunition Storage Facilities
- Commissary Facilities
- Correctional Facilities
- Fortifications
- Hospitals
- Housing
- Containers, crates
- Military Intelligence Facilities
- Museums
- POL (Petroleum, Oils, & Lubricants) Storage and Handling Facilities
- Recreation Facilities
- Research Facilities
- Training Facilities
- Utility Structures
- Vehicle Repair, Maintenance, & Storage Facilities
- Weapons and Ammunition Production Facilities

== Administrative facilities ==
Military organizations of all types must support a wide range of administrative functions including personnel management, accounting, and procurement. Some facilities are quite similar to civilian office buildings while others are converted from other military uses and can be quite idiosyncratic.

== Ammunition storage facilities ==
Ammunition is frequently stored in small quantities in reinforced structures which are widely separated. Standard designs are sometimes called "igloos".

== Commissary facilities ==
Traditionally, military units provided most of the rations, uniforms, and other supplies needed by most military personnel. However, modern units often provide fewer items and many personnel must buy some items with their own funds. Personnel with families also must buy food, clothing, and other necessities for the family. This has created the need for modern commissary and “PX” (post exchange) buildings. In some cases, these buildings are similar to modern supermarkets.

== Correctional facilities ==
Most military installations have small jails for temporary holding of suspects or short term punishment of minor offenses. However, military organizations also have larger, centralized facilities for longer term incarceration of persons convicted of more serious offenses. The main correctional facility of the US Army, Air Force, and Marines is the United States Disciplinary Barracks located at Fort Leavenworth, Kansas.

== Fortifications ==
Fortifications vary widely in nature depending on the mission and type of unit engaged.

== Hospitals ==
Full-service military hospitals are a fairly recent innovation in military history. Prior to the nineteenth century, military hospitals as we know them today did not exist. Soldiers wounded in combat were treated in the field or in makeshift facilities commandeered near the field of battle. Medical technology at the time was such that most serious wounds were fatal and, accordingly, there was little need for facilities that provided for long-term care and recuperation. Battlefield amputations were one of the most common procedures and were only successful in saving the life of the victim in a limited number of cases.

However, beginning in the nineteenth and twentieth centuries, advances in blood transfusion, anesthesia, antibiotics, and trauma treatment meant that many more soldiers could survive wounds although the treatment time was much longer. Also, advances in the treatment of infectious diseases meant that many more personnel required treatment for non-combat conditions.

All of these conditions, plus an increasing number of personnel with families, have led to the construction of full service military hospitals. These hospitals treat both members of the military and their families.

== Housing ==
Military housing includes barracks, UOQs (unescorted or "bachelor" officer quarters), and family housing. The age and condition of these facilities varies widely. A few officer family housing units are very historical in nature and can be quite large and ornate. Most family and UOQ housing is now similar in nature to civilian housing stock. In most advanced countries, barracks housing has been modernized, but remnants of housing from World War II and older periods still remains in the inventory.

== Mess ==
“Mess” is the military term for any facility serving food to large groups. Some mess halls in remote locations can be rudimentary, but others in established locations can be similar to modern cafeterias.

== Military intelligence facilities ==
These facilities are highly secured. Modern facilities involve intensive use of electronics and computer technology.

== Museums ==
Because of the role military actions have played in determining world history, military museums are common. They range widely from small facilities memorializing the actions of local units to large, sophisticated facilities devoted to an entire branch of service or entire wars.

== POL (Petroleum, Oils, & Lubricants) storage and handling facilities ==
These facilities are engineered to provide safe storage and handling of petroleum-based materials. Newer facilities include containments to prevent environmental pollution from due to spills.

== Recreation facilities ==
Recreation facilities for both military personnel and their families. Athletic facilities are common as are officers' clubs and NCO/enlisted personnel clubs. Recreation facilities are usually exercise or athletic entertainment type places.

== Research facilities ==
Military organizations conduct extensive research operations and maintain extensive purpose-built research facilities to support those activities.

== Training facilities ==
Traditional military training facilities focused on physical conditioning and skills training. Newer facilities make extensive use of computer simulations of various kinds to provide more hours or training in more realistic situations at lower cost and with lower risk to personnel. Military academies are devoted entirely to training military officer cadets. Facilities for advanced training of senior officers also exist. Examples include the US Army Command and General Staff College at Ft. Leavenworth, KS.

== Utility structures ==
Many military installations are large enough to require their own utility systems. Water treatment plants, sewage treatment plants, and electric power generation stations are found on many military installations.

== Vehicle repair, maintenance, & storage facilities ==
Vehicle repair shops can be very large and built to accommodate large vehicles. Aircraft hangars are some of the largest and most specialized military buildings.

== Weapons & ammunition production facilities ==
Production of ammunition is now largely outsourced to industry contractors. However, facilities such as Sunflower Army Ammunition Plant produced small arms ammunition for the US Military for many years. More exotic facilities such as Rocky Mountain Arsenal (now decommissioned) was the main facility for production of chemical weapons.
