= Greyson Jenista =

American baseball player (born 1996)

- Right fielder
- Born: December 7, 1996 (age 28); Lawrence, Kansas, U.S.
- Bats: Left Throws: Right

Greyson Douglas Jenista (born December 7, 1996) is an American former professional baseball right fielder. Jenista attended De Soto High School in De Soto, Kansas, and Wichita State University, where he played college baseball for the Wichita State Shockers.

== Career ==
=== Amateur ===
In 2017, he played collegiate summer baseball for the Cotuit Kettleers of the Cape Cod Baseball League and was named the league's most valuable player.

=== Atlanta Braves ===
The Atlanta Braves selected Jenista in the second round, with the 49th overall selection, of the 2018 Major League Baseball draft. He signed and played ten games for the Danville Braves of the Rookie-level Appalachian League, and was promoted to the Rome Braves of the Single–A South Atlantic League. After 32 games in Rome, he was promoted to the Florida Fire Frogs of the High–A Florida State League. In 61 total games between the two teams, he hit .265 with four home runs and 34 RBIs. He returned to Florida to begin 2019, and was promoted to the Double–A Mississippi Braves in June. Over 130 games between both teams, he batted .233 with nine home runs and 55 RBIs. He was selected to play in the Arizona Fall League for the Scottsdale Scorpions following the season.

Jenista did not play in a game in 2020 due to the cancellation of the minor league season because of the COVID-19 pandemic. He returned to action in 2021, playing in 89 games for Double–A Mississippi and hitting .216/.344/.465 with 19 home runs and 42 RBI. Jenista spent the 2022 season with the Triple–A Gwinnett Stripers. Appearing in 96 games, he hit .206/.269/.374 with 14 home runs and 33 RBI. He was released by the Braves organization on March 28, 2023.

=== Kansas City Royals ===
On May 13, 2023, Jenista signed a minor league contract with the Kansas City Royals organization. In 27 games split between the Double–A Northwest Arkansas Naturals and Triple–A Omaha Storm Chasers, he accumulated a .179/.264/.358 batting line with 3 home runs and 6 RBI. On July 4, Jenista was released by the Royals.
