= De Soto USD 232 =

Public school district in De Soto, Kansas

Address
- 35200 West 91st St. De Soto, Kansas, 66018; United States
- Coordinates: 38.9773°N 94.9702°W

District information
- Type: Public
- Grades: K to 12

Other information
- Website: usd232.org

De Soto USD 232 is a public unified school district headquartered in De Soto, Kansas, United States. The district includes the communities of De Soto, 60% of Shawnee, 40% of Lenexa, fraction of Olathe, and nearby rural areas.

== History ==
As of the 2013–2014 school year, the district's attendance is roughly 7,000.

The district encompasses over 100 square miles (260 km^{2}), serving the city of De Soto and approximately 60% of Shawnee, 40% of Lenexa, fraction of Olathe, and rural parts of the county. Most of the district's students live in the City of Shawnee.

== Schools ==
The school district operates the following schools:

- De Soto High School, home of the Wildcats
- Mill Valley High School, home of the Jaguars
- Lexington Trails Middle School, home of the Panthers
- Monticello Trails Middle School, home of the Timberwolves
- Mill Creek Middle School, home of the Mustangs
- Belmont Elementary School
- Clear Creek Elementary School
- Horizon Elementary School
- Mize Elementary School
- Prairie Ridge Elementary School
- Riverview Elementary School
- Starside Elementary School

== See also ==
- List of high schools in Kansas
- List of unified school districts in Kansas
- Kansas State Department of Education
- Kansas State High School Activities Association
