= Highway 2 Bridge =

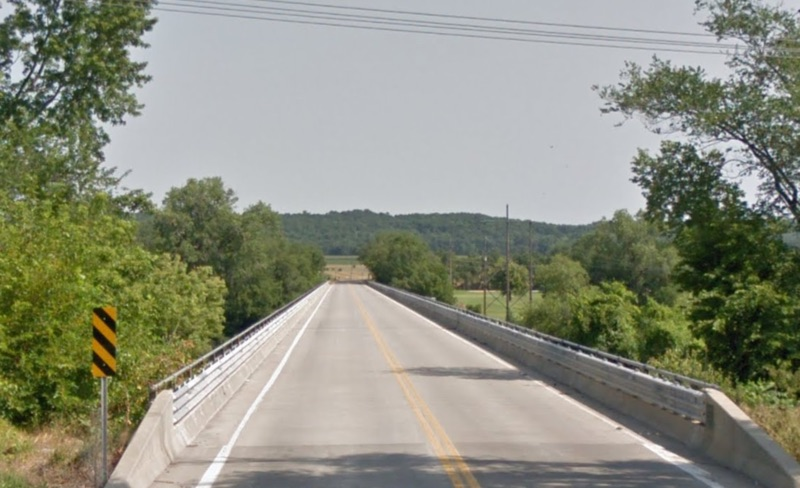
- View of Highway 2 Bridge in De Soto
- Coordinates: 38.98223°N 94.96481°W
- Carries: 2 lanes of South Wyandotte Street
- Crosses: Kansas River, BNSF Railway Line & Beecroft Lane
- Locale: De Soto, Kansas
- Maintained by: Leavenworth and Johnson Counties

Characteristics
- Design: Girder

History
- Opened: 1964

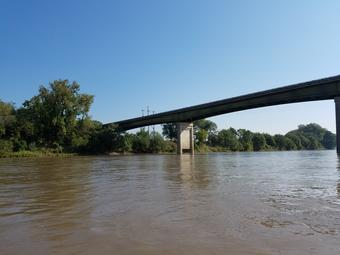
View of Highway 2 as it crosses the Kansas River in De Soto

The Highway 2 Bridge is an automobile and pedestrian crossing of the Kansas River on the border of Johnson and Leavenworth Counties in De Soto. The current bridge was built in 1964.

A girder bridge, it is the only bridge over the river for a span of 15 miles, as Eudora's bridge is 4 miles west and Bonner Spring's K-7 Highway Bridge is 11 miles to the east.

The bridge runs concurrent with Leavenworth County Highway 2 and S. Wyandotte Street.

The two lane bridge has a span of 1,670 feet[1] and was opened in 1965, built at a cost of $600,000. It was designed to be at least three feet higher than the levels reached in the Great Flood of 1951.

Its predecessor bridge was damaged by flood circa. 1895, reopened in 1937, then collapsed after a U.S. Army truck weighed more than the maximum supported weight in 1956, reopened again in 1959 before being damaged beyond use by ice in January 1962. After repairs, the current bridge opened in 1964.

There was some contention between Leavenworth and Johnson counties regarding the DeSoto bridge and similar bridge projects.

Repairs to the old bridge included those made in 1928, 1930, and 1931. Repair costs were shared by Johnson County and Leavenworth County.

Replacement of the bridge is planned for 2030, with a shared use path for cyclists and pedestrians.
