= De Soto High School (Kansas) =

Public high school in DeSoto, Kansas

Location
- 35000 West 91st Street; De Soto, KS; United States
- Coordinates: 38°57′56″N 94°59′11″W

Information
- School type: Public High School
- Established: 1919
- School district: De Soto USD 232
- Principal: Samuel Ruff
- Teaching staff: 66.00 (FTE)
- Grades: 9-12
- Enrollment: 968 (2023–2024)
- Student to teacher ratio: 14.67
- Campus: Suburban
- Colors: Green, White, and Black
- Athletics conference: United Kansas Conference
- Mascot: Wildcat
- Rival: Basehor-Linwood High School
- Newspaper: The Green Pride
- Information: 913-667-6250
- Website: usd232.org/dhs

De Soto High School is a public secondary school in De Soto, Kansas operated by De Soto USD 232 public school district, and serves students of grades 9 to 12. The school is located near highway K-10 and Lexington Avenue on 91st Street. Around 900 students in grades 9–12 attend DHS.

== History ==
The school first opened in 1919 as a small white wooden school in De Soto. Then the high school was moved to the present day City Hall and after the destruction of the original school the lower grades were moved to a building where district offices are today nearby the City Hall. The high school was then expanded to include the present day community center which has one of the oldest sunken gyms still in use in the Midwest. After the school experienced overcrowding, the present day middle school was built as the then high school building. The middle school was then moved to the City hall. Years later, after overcrowding yet again, the high school was moved to its present location.

== See also ==
- List of high schools in Kansas
- List of unified school districts in Kansas

Other high schools in De Soto USD 232 school district:

- Mill Valley High School in Shawnee
