= Mill Valley High School =

Location
- 5900 Monticello Road; Shawnee, Kansas 66226; United States; 39°01′12″N 94°50′27″W

Information
- School type: Public high school
- Established: 2000
- School district: De Soto USD 232
- Principal: Gail Holder
- Staff: 82.50 (on an FTE basis)
- Grades: 9–12
- Enrollment: 1,383 (2023–2024)
- Student to teacher ratio: 16.76
- Campus: Suburban
- Colors: Midnight blue and silver
- Mascot: Jaguars
- Newspaper: The JagWire
- Yearbook: The JAG
- Website: mvhs.usd232.org

Mill Valley High School is a high school located in Shawnee, Kansas, and operated by De Soto USD 232 public school district. As of the 2020–2021 school year, its attendance is roughly 1,306.

Mill Valley is a member of the Kansas State High School Activities Association and offers a variety of sports programs. Athletic teams compete in the 6A division and are known as the "Jaguars". Extracurricular activities are also offered in the form of performing arts, school publications, and clubs.

== History ==
The school began classes in 2000–01. In 2008, the school district proposed and passed two bond issues to expand the school because of ongoing increases in attendance. Construction on Mill Valley began in February 2009. The construction was finished in the summer of 2010. The second expansion of the school building follows a prior extension of the "A" hallway including the construction of a dedicated art wing.

A second expansion occurred in 2019–20, resulting in a new theatre, fieldhouse, gym, a total of nearly 60,000 square feet of new space. These projects were completed for the 2020–21 school year at a cost of $20.3 million.

== Extracurricular activities ==
=== Arts ===
==== Choral Music ====
Mill Valley's choral program offers a two mixed choruses, two girls groups, and a mixed ensemble. The Jag Chorale, Mill Valley's advanced mixed chorus, has sung with the Kansas City Chorale, and has received straight one ratings in Male, Female, and Mixed group performance at contest in 2013 and 2014.

==== Band ====
While no orchestral program is offered, Mill Valley has three standard bands, the Blue, Silver, and Symphonic Bands, as well as a Jazz Band. Both Blue and Silver bands have received high marks at contests in Kansas and Missouri. During the 2015–2016 school year, Mill Valley created the Symphonic Band, an audition-only ensemble for upper-level musicians. Jazz Band received high marks at the Kansas City Jazz Summit festival in 2017.

==== Theatre ====
The Mill Valley Theatre Department puts on two productions a year (usually these consist of one fall musical and one spring play), and the department also offers many stage related classes such as Drama I, Drama II, and Stagecraft.

Their 2018 student-led production of She Loves Me was the first Thespian musical produced at the school.

=== Academics ===
==== Debate ====
The Debate team has competed since the school's inception, sending teams to State level competition most years.

==== Scholars Bowl ====
The Scholars Bowl Team has competed at the state level frequently, winning state twice in 2015 and 2009, alongside a 2nd place in 2025 and multiple other 3rd place finishes. It also participated in the U.S. Department of Energy National Science Bowl in Washington, D.C. in 2007 and 2009.

==== Robotics ====
The Robotics team was founded in 2006, participating in the FIRST Robotics Competition winning the Midwest Regional in its rookie season. The team has the number 1810, and was named Jaguar Robotics. In 2023, due to the high quantity of students joining from DeSoto High School, 1810 changed its name from Jaguar Robotics to CATATRONICS. Alongside that change, and due to a significant increase in members after moving to the Cedar Trails Exploration Center, a second team was created with the number 9316 named the CUBATRONICS. Team 1810 consists of Juniors and Seniors, and 9316 consists of Freshmen and Sophomores. The team has attended the FIRST Championship 4 times, in 2006, 2013, 2017, and 2018. In 2024, the team began hosting the Heartland Regional at Mill Valley High School.

==== Science Olympiad ====
The Science Olympiad team, also founded during the 2005–06 school year, competed at the state level in 2007, 2008, 2009, 2010, 2011, 2012, 2013 and 2014.

=== Athletics ===
The Jaguars are classified as a 6A school, the largest classification in Kansas according to the Kansas State High School Activities Association, though they play football at the 5A level. Mill Valley offers the following sports: baseball, basketball, bowling, football, golf, soccer, tennis, cheerleading, cross country, dance team, softball, track & field, volleyball, swimming, and wrestling.

The Mill Valley football team won the school's first state championship in 2015, defeating Bishop Carrol High School 35–14 at Pittsburg on November 28, 2015. They finished their season 12–1 and were ranked #1 in the state of Kansas for all classes, and #74 in the nation, according to MaxPreps.

As of 2024, the football team has won eight titles. The boys' basketball and wrestling programs have won their own titles, while the girls' golf, cross country teams have added the first girls' state titles in school history. In 2020, the Silver Stars Dance Team won their first state title in the inaugural KSHSAA Dance State competition. In Spring 2021, the Silver Stars won the schools first ever National title by winning the Medium Varsity Jazz division with the National Dance Alliance High School Championship. In the fall of 2023, Mill Valley also won their first state championship in cheer. In the fall of 2023, the volleyball program added their first state title and repeated in 2024.

==== State championships ====
State Championships
Season	Sport	Number of Championships	Year
Fall	Football	8	2015, 2016, 2019, 2020, 2021, 2022, 2023, 2024
Fall	Cross Country, Girls	3	2018, 2019, 2021
Fall	Golf, Girls	1	2018
Fall	Soccer, Boys	1	2022
Fall	Cheerleading	2	2023, 2024
Fall	Volleyball	2	2023, 2024
Winter	Basketball, Boys	1	2016
Winter	Wrestling, Boys	1	2020
Winter	Dance, Girls	3	2020, 2021, 2022
Spring	Track and Field, Boys	2	2021, 2022
Spring	Track and Field, Girls	2	2022, 2025
Spring	Soccer, Girls	2	2022, 2026
Total		28	

== Publications ==
In addition to the Jagwire newspaper and JAG yearbook, the Mill Valley broadcast department produces a new Mill Valley Television (MVTV) episode each week. The broadcast and video productions department have won multiple awards for visual effects and overall quality.

Both of Mill Valley's other publications, the 2006 JAG yearbook and the JagWire newspaper, won second place at the National High School Journalism convention, for best of show.

At the 2009 National High School Journalism Convention in Washington, D.C., the 2009 JAG ("Words") received the "Best of Show" award, and the JagWire received tenth place in said category for News magazine. The 2009 JAG is also a recipient of the National Pacemaker Award, widely considered to be the "Pulitzer Prize of student journalism."

In fall of 2011, the JagWire launched the website MV News.org and publishes web exclusive content daily. The website placed tenth in "Best of Show" for small schools in 2011.

Mill Valley journalism was named the State Champion in the Kansas Scholastic Press Association State Contest in 2013, 2014 and 2016.

== Notable alumni ==
- Lucas Krull, NFL tight end for Denver Broncos.
- Sam Hecht, NFL Center for Carolina Panthers.
- Jayden Woods, college football defensive end for Florida Gators.

== See also ==
- List of high schools in Kansas
- List of unified school districts in Kansas

Other high schools in De Soto USD 232 school district:

- De Soto High School
