= Sunflower Army Ammunition Plant =

Munitions manufacturer

Coordinates: 38.9336°N 95.0076°W

Sunflower Army Ammunition Plant, entrance billboard and water towers, 2005

The Sunflower Army Ammunition Plant was a smokeless powder and propellant manufacturing facility in De Soto within Johnson County, Kansas. Constructed after the attack on Pearl Harbor pushed the United States into World War II, it was the largest ammunition plant in the world during operation. At the time of operations, the plant was located in southwest unincorporated Johnson County, Kansas, owned by the United States Government, and operated under contract, primarily by Hercules Aerospace Company.

In 2005, the U.S. Army transferred the former plant site to the Sunflower Redevelopment Group; in 2022, over 6,000 acres of the site were annexed into De Soto.

In 2022, construction began on a large Panasonic battery plant.

== History ==
The Sunflower Army Ammunition Plant was originally known as the Sunflower Ordnance Works. Established in 1941 on 10,747 acres (43.492 km^{2}), it was the world's largest smokeless powder plant. Among the over 10,000 acres of the site was the former community of Prairie Center. The entire town was purchased by the U.S. government, and razed. Many of the residents and cemetery plots were transferred to Eudora and De Soto. Although owned by the U.S. government, the plant was operated by the Hercules Powder Company under a contract signed on May 11, 1942. Construction then began immediately and was followed by the first production of propellant 10 months later.

During World War II, the Sunflower Ordnance Works produced more than 200 million pounds (91,000,000 kg) of propellants and employed as many as 12,067 people. The influx of workers dramatically changed the surrounding area, specifically De Soto. Within only a few weeks of the plant’s initial announcement, cars loaded with people and all of their belongings began to line the Kansas highways as people poured into the area seeking jobs. Initially, it was announced that 4,000-6,000 employees would be expected to live in surrounding areas and commute to the plant.

Initially, most of the staff would reside in Lawrence, where the Army and Hercules officials set up operations. Following the initial construction announcement, Lawrence set up housing and transportation committees to facilitate support to the plant.

Soon after, trailers were added at the plant site to provide staff and construction workers with round-the-clock access. On December 15, 1942, “Trailer Town” opened on the plant grounds. Trailer Town provided basic necessities, including water and power, and a row of out-houses served the residents. This temporary community grew to 400-units and included a grocery store and school. The situation seemed to change overnight. In 1941, Eudora had no hotel or boarding house and only about seven vacant homes. Within three months, the town’s population had doubled to 1,800, and there were as many as 150 trailers placed in fields, yards, and other empty spaces. In the meantime, De Soto’s population had increased from 400 to over 1,000.

In both De Soto and Eudora, homes rented out all available space, including garages, out-buildings, basements, and spare rooms. People slept in cars and tents as weather permitted. Restaurants, banks, laundry, and service stations were open round the clock as the communities struggled to keep up with demand.

A rail spur to De Soto was completed in July 1942, allowing construction to speed up with the faster transit of materials. Bus companies added routes synced to Sunflower shifts to link Eudora and De Soto with Lawrence and Kansas City. Carpooling became a requirement for employees.

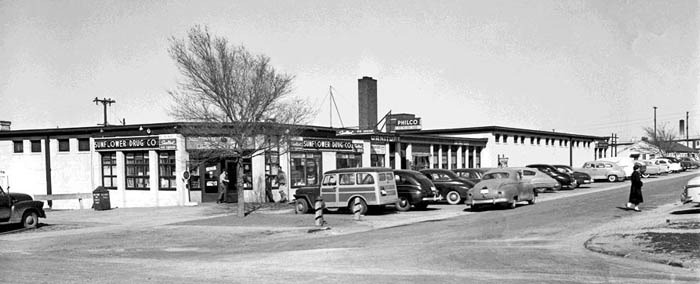
Commercial Center off of Lexington Avenue, Clearview City

By September 1942, it was clear that the plant needed to provide living quarters for some of its employees. By late 1942, the government announced the construction of a housing project north of the plant, referred to as Clearview City.

=== After the war ===
Following the war, the plant was placed on partial standby. And in March 1947, the contract with Hercules Powder Company expired. When the plant was placed on complete standby in June 1948, the government took over maintenance and security.

In 1951, the Sunflower Ordnance Works was brought out of standby due to the Korean War. Once again, on June 30, 1952, the operation of the plant was contracted out to Hercules. This time the plant produced more than 166 million pounds (75,000,000 kg) of propellants, with employment of up to 5,374. The plant then went into standby again in June 1960.

The name of the plant was changed from the Sunflower Ordnance Works to Sunflower Army Ammunition Plant (SFAAP) on August 1, 1963. Two years later, on August 20, 1965, the plant was reactivated to aid the Vietnam War by producing in excess of 145 million pounds (66,000,000 kg) of propellants before ceasing operations in June 1971. While operating during this time, the plant employed up to 4,065 people. In 1972, the plant was returned to standby status.

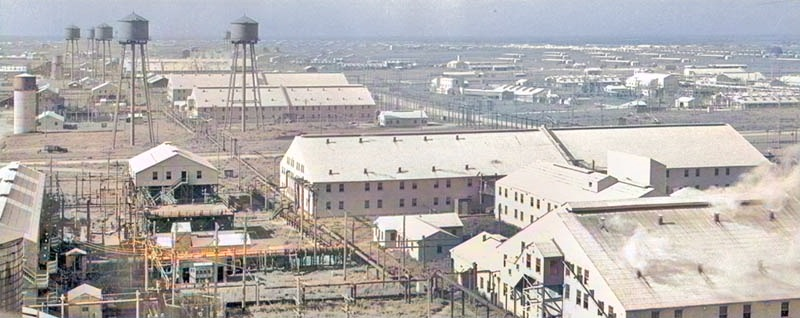
View of plant, circa 1943

A major facility modernization program was started in August 1967. The program included the construction, between 1975 and 1979, of a facility for the production of nitroguanidine. This facility was the first of its kind in North America and began production in 1984 and continued until 1992, when the plant was again placed on standby. Nitroguanidine (NQ) is an essential component of triple-base gun propellant. In addition to being an oxidizer and energy carrier, it is loaded with hydrogen and this provides cooling in the gun tube which reduces the erosion rate of the tube metal so more rounds can be fired before refit. NQ was shipped out in fiberboard drums to another army facility where the triple-base is prepared,

Alliant Techsystems won a contract on March 10, 1995 to market the use of the Sunflower Army Ammunition Plant facilities. Also in February 1995, the Environmental Protection Agency proposed that the site be placed on the National Priorities List, but it was never listed. Early in 1998, SFAAP was declared excess by the U.S. Army, and the General Services Administration began the process of selling the site. As of October 1, 2001, the Army changed to a maintenance contractor and reduced the number of buildings used to an office building, an environmental laboratory, the old guard headquarters as a records repository, and the guard shack at the main gate.

The Sunflower Army Ammunition Plant rail system was operated under contract by Hercules, Inc. The system included 59 miles of track, with rails ranging in size from 85 to 100 pounds (per yard) connecting with BNSF Railway, and the engine house was Building 501. Operations were conducted from Monday through Friday, 0800 to 1600 with a GE 80-ton locomotive numbered US Army 1662. Formerly assigned to Letterkenny Army Depot, PA, the locomotive went from Sunflower AAP to McAlester AAP, OK, where it was reported to being shipped to Seneca Army Depot in New York, in October 1999. When Seneca AD closed, the locomotive was sold to the Dominican Republic. All of the track at Sunflower AAP was pulled up following the plant's closure.

=== Closure and future ===
After the closure of the plant in 1993, plans for potential development of the 15.5 square-mile lot south of De Soto began to make rounds around locals, plans for an Oz Entertainment amusement park consumed seven futile years, after which the land was transferred to the Sunflower Redevelopment Group in 2005. At that time, about 3,700 acres were transferred clean, but much of that land was targeted for open space, buffer and parkland. Another plan that was set to open in 2002 was the newly announced Kansas Speedway and Kansas City Wizards stadiums. Recently, a master use plan has been adopted by the cities of Olathe, De Soto, Johnson County, the State of Kansas and Sunflower Redevelopment Group. The master plan calls for high density housing, major commercial zoning, a "downtown" area for offices, high density commercial and civic uses, and land promised to The University of Kansas, Kansas State University and the City of De Soto, as well as land being reserved for the army reserves, parks and other public spaces. However, the cleanup is expected to be completed by 2028. Recently, the northern portions of the plant have been declared clean and cleared for development. In late 2022, the developer rebranded the site as Astra Enterprise Park.

==== Panasonic Energy ====
In 2021, following extensive cleanup and decontamination of site, clearance for development was granted by the U.S. Army Corps of Engineers on the northernmost portion of the site, and De Soto initiated annexation of 6,376 acres of the site. Shortly thereafter, De Soto established a short-term plan to improve roadway and utility access to the area, as well as establishing a TIF (tax increment financing) district, in an effort to encourage development.

In early 2022, the Kansas legislature passed a bill, referred to as APEX, signed by Governor Laura Kelly, providing $800 million in tax breaks and incentives on a proposed $4 billion project by a company whose identity was concealed by a non-disclosure agreement between the two parties. It was believed that this project was to either be developed on the site, or in Pryor Creek, Oklahoma, due to the extensive amount of land that was expected to be required.

On July 13, 2022, state officials announced during a press conference that Panasonic was the company in question, and had selected De Soto for its planned $4 billion electric-vehicle battery manufacturing facility, to be constructed on the northernmost portion of the former plant. The facility is expected to provide 4,000 direct jobs, with an estimated 4,000 additional jobs by non-direct development related to the facility, and 16,000 construction jobs. It is the largest, costliest single development in Kansas' history, and will be one of the largest private employers in the state once operational. Construction began in December 2022.

==== Utility-Scale Solar Facility ====
The master plan for the site calls for an industrial-scale solar farm able to produce 600-800MW of power on approximately 3000 acres.

==== Digital Realty ====
In mid-2026, Digital Realty proposed a 600MW data center development on the northeast portion of the site where the rail yard previously existed. The Astra North proposal calls for nine buildings totaling approximately a million square feet, and two electrical substations on 280 acres. Digital Realty purchased approximately 1435 acres of the site in April 2026, but has not yet made any proposals for the remaining land. The project is expected to cost approximately $4 billion for the first phase, excluding data center equipment.
