= Lee Richardson Zoo =

Zoo in Garden City, Kansas, United States

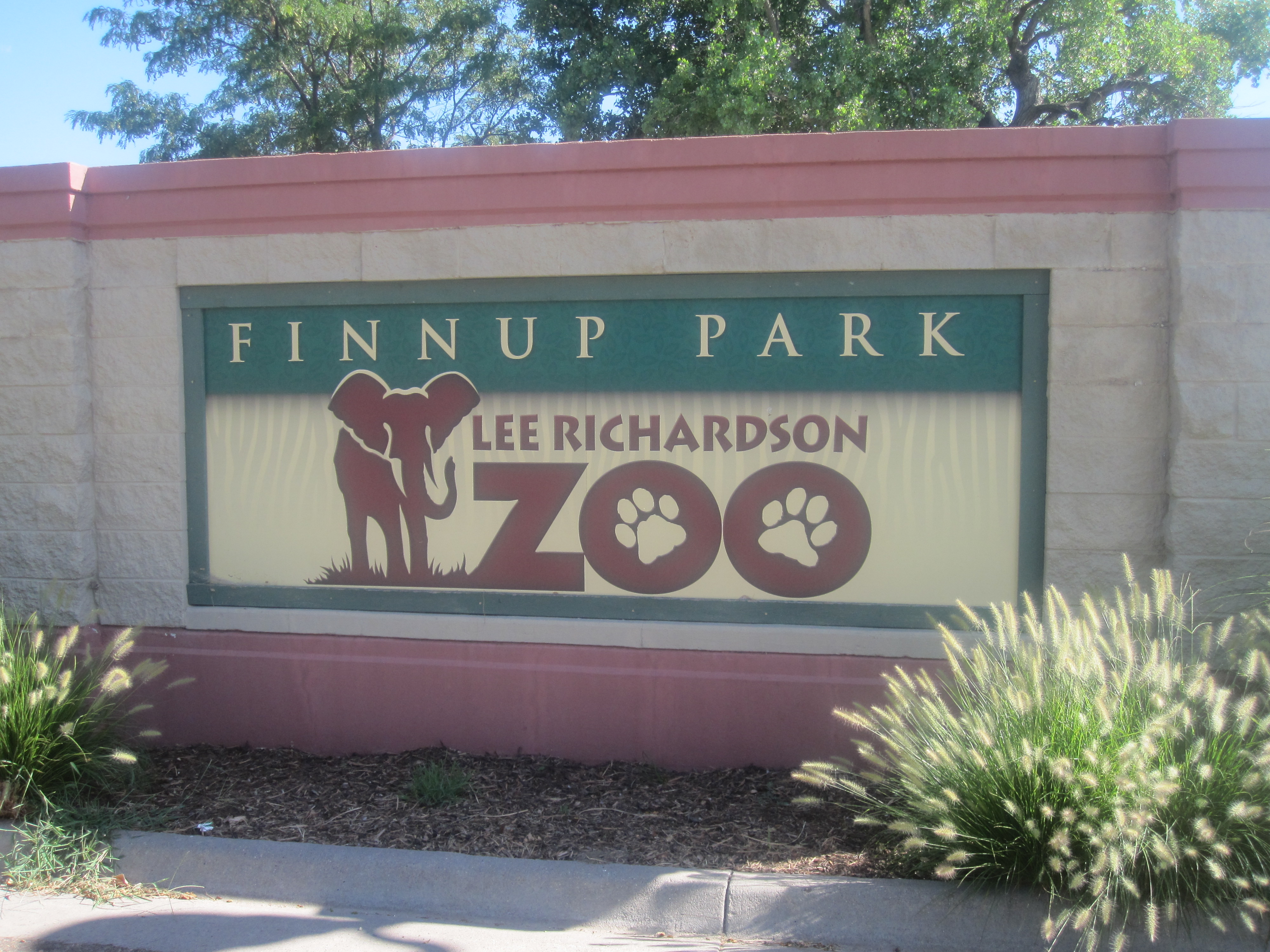
- Interactive map of Lee Richardson Zoo
- 37.9591°N 100.8722°W
- Location: Garden City, Kansas, United States
- Land area: 47 acres (19 ha)
- No. of species: 80
- Annual visitors: 170,000
- Memberships: AZA
- Public transit: Finney County Transit
- Website: www.leerichardsonzoo.org

The Lee Richardson Zoo is an AZA accredited zoo in Garden City, Kansas. The zoo has more than 80 species of animals located on 47 acres (19 ha) inside Finnup Park and includes many animals that are non-native to southwest Kansas. Admission is free for pedestrians or $20 per car.

== History ==
Finnup Park was established by a donation of 105 acres (42 ha) of land to the city by George Finnup. The zoo was started in 1927 by the city and the local chapter of the Izaak Walton League, with two skunks brought in by Lee Richardson, who was Chief of Police and Park and founder and Zoo Superintendent at the time. The zoo was formally named for Lee Richardson in 1950, just a year before he died.

The Lee Richardson Zoo is a department of the City of Garden City.

== Exhibits ==
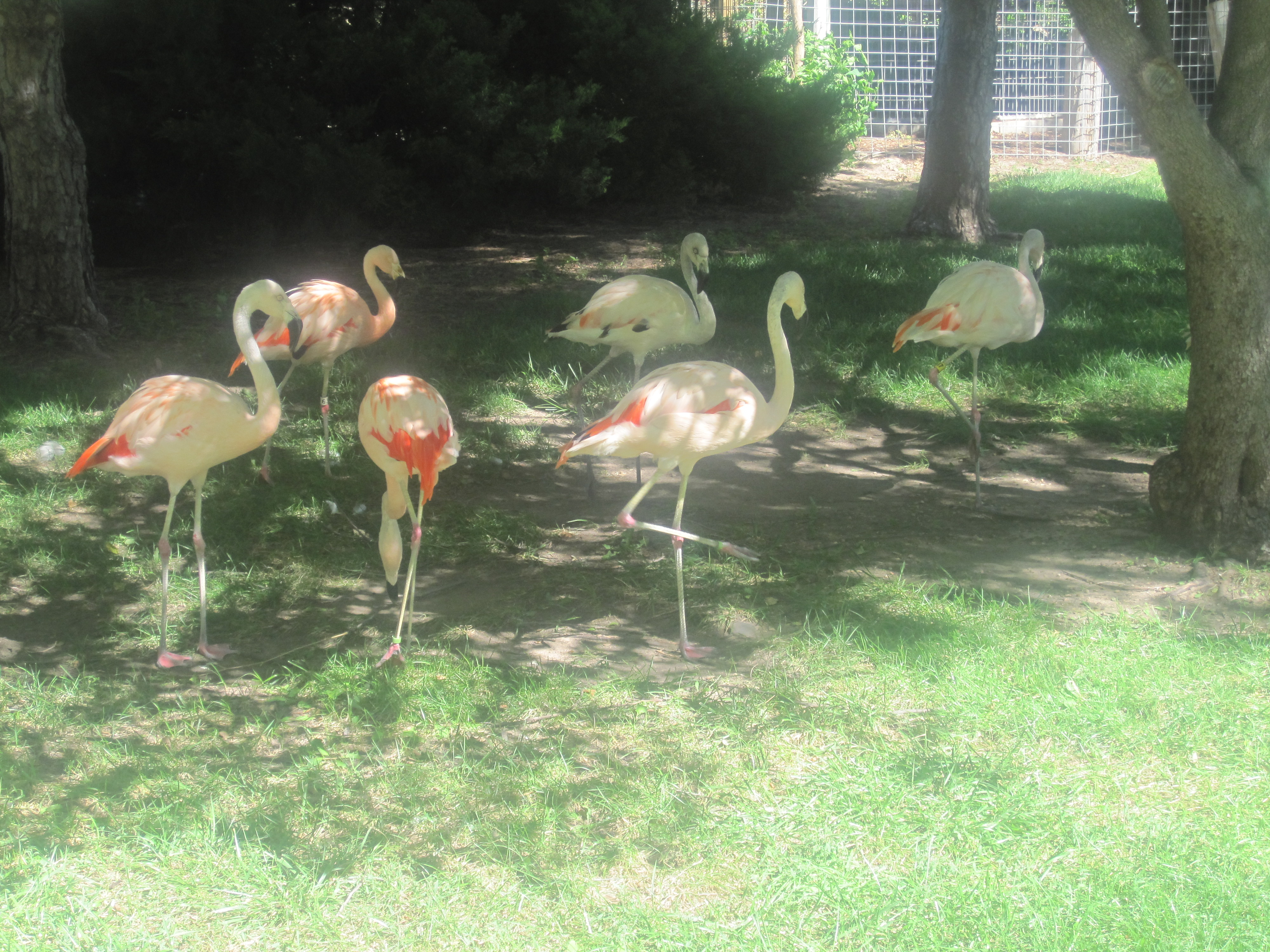
Flamingos

North American Plains
This section of the zoo includes "Kansas Waters" with its river otters and the Burrowing owl exhibit, as well as desert bighorn sheep, elk, and bison.

South American Pampas
The South American Pampas exhibit includes maned wolf, anteater, alpaca, and rhea. Flamingos are housed next to this exhibit.

Aviary
The "Marie Osterbuhr Aviary" was opened in 1985. It features a large open-air flight cage, as well as indoor displays that are home to various species, including Goeldi's monkeys.

Cat Canyon

Cat Canyon opened in 2012 and houses the zoo's cougars, jaguars, and bobcats.

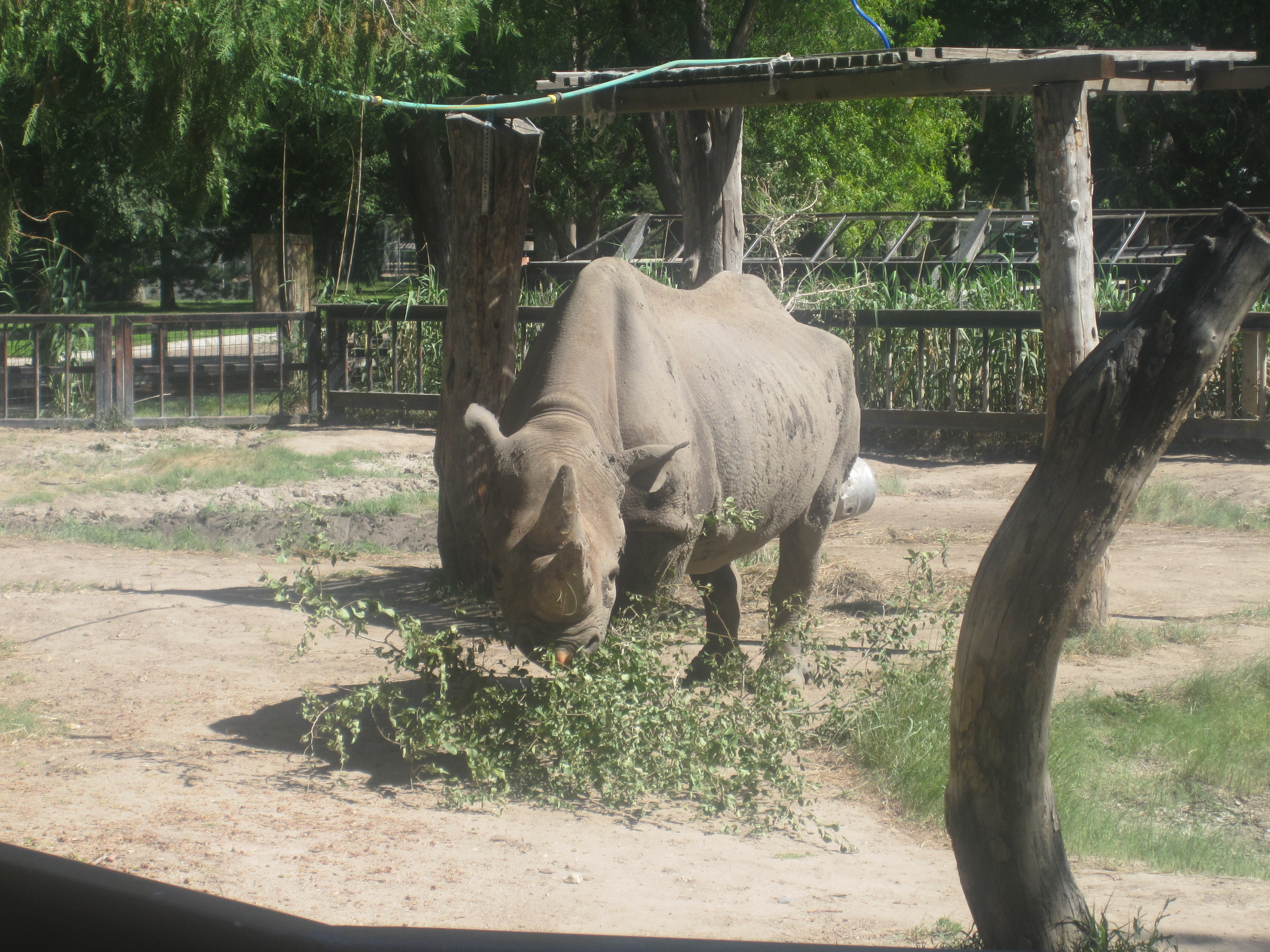
Rhinoceros

Pachyderms
The Pachyderm exhibit houses black rhinos.

Down Under
Down Under is home to the zoos' Australian animals, including a mob of red kangaroo.

African Plains

The African Plains area consists of two large open yards designed to look like the African Savannah, and includes addax, and East African crowned cranes. This section also includes reticulated giraffes, an eastern black rhinoceros crash, and lions.

Wild Asia
The Wild Asia exhibit opened in 1998, and includes Northern white-cheeked gibbons, red pandas, Bactrian camels, snow leopards, Amur leopards, goral, a pair of sloth bears, along with an Asian farm that includes Karakul sheep.

Locomotive
An old Garden City Western Railway steam locomotive is on static display behind the Snack/Gift Shop and across the Drive-In Entrance/Kiosk.

== Gallery ==
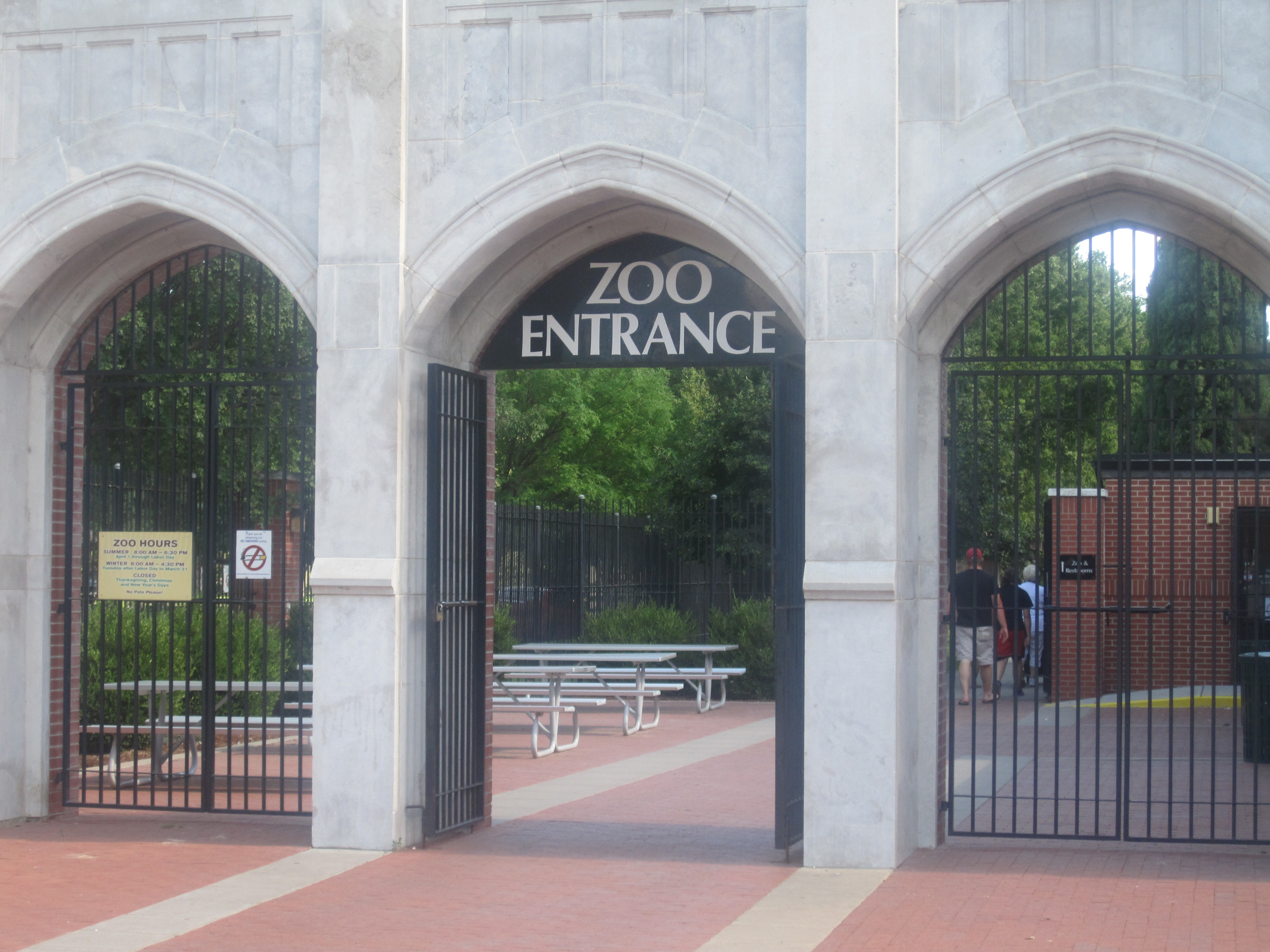
Walking entrance to Lee Richardson Zoo

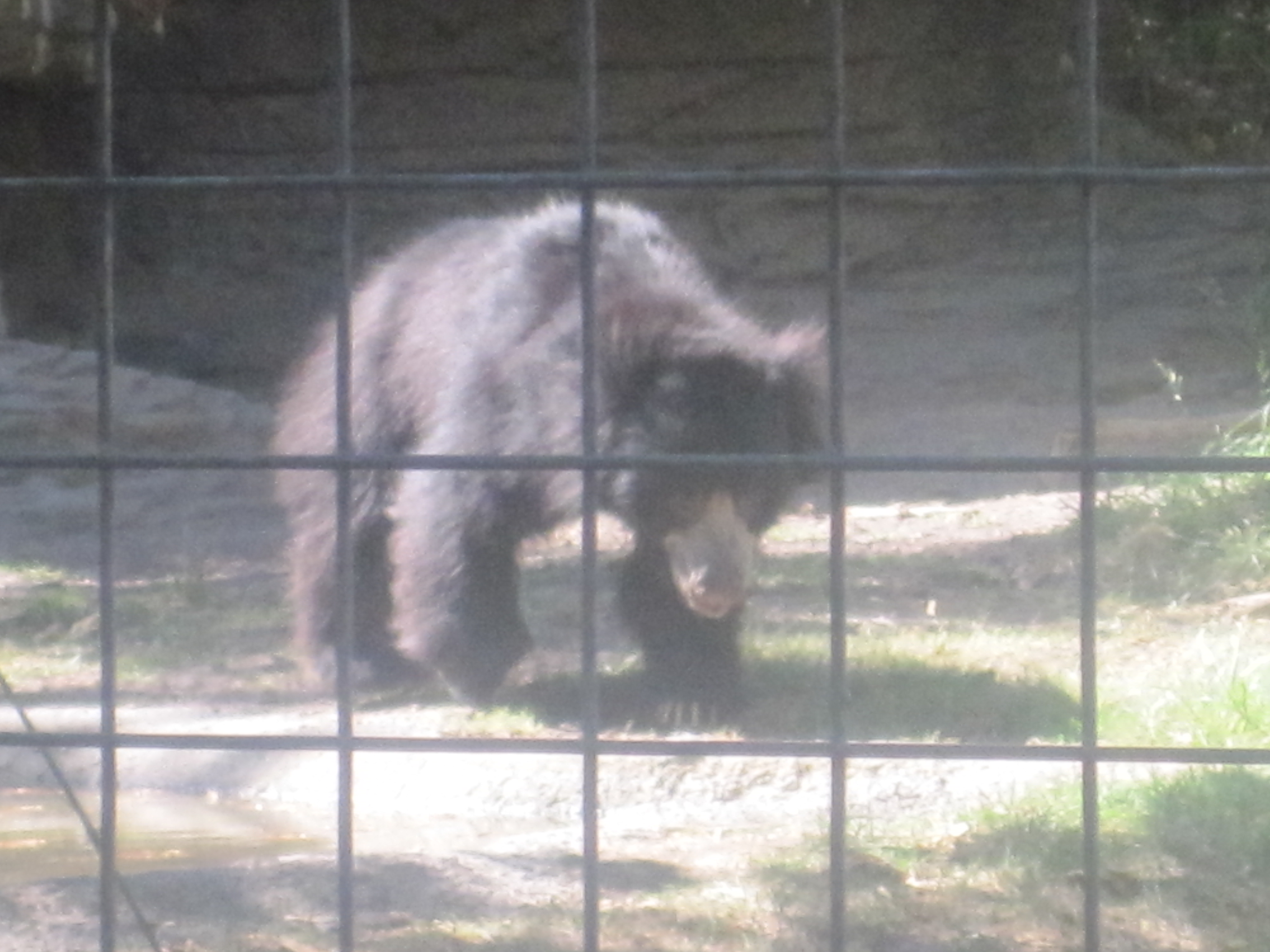
Sloth bear

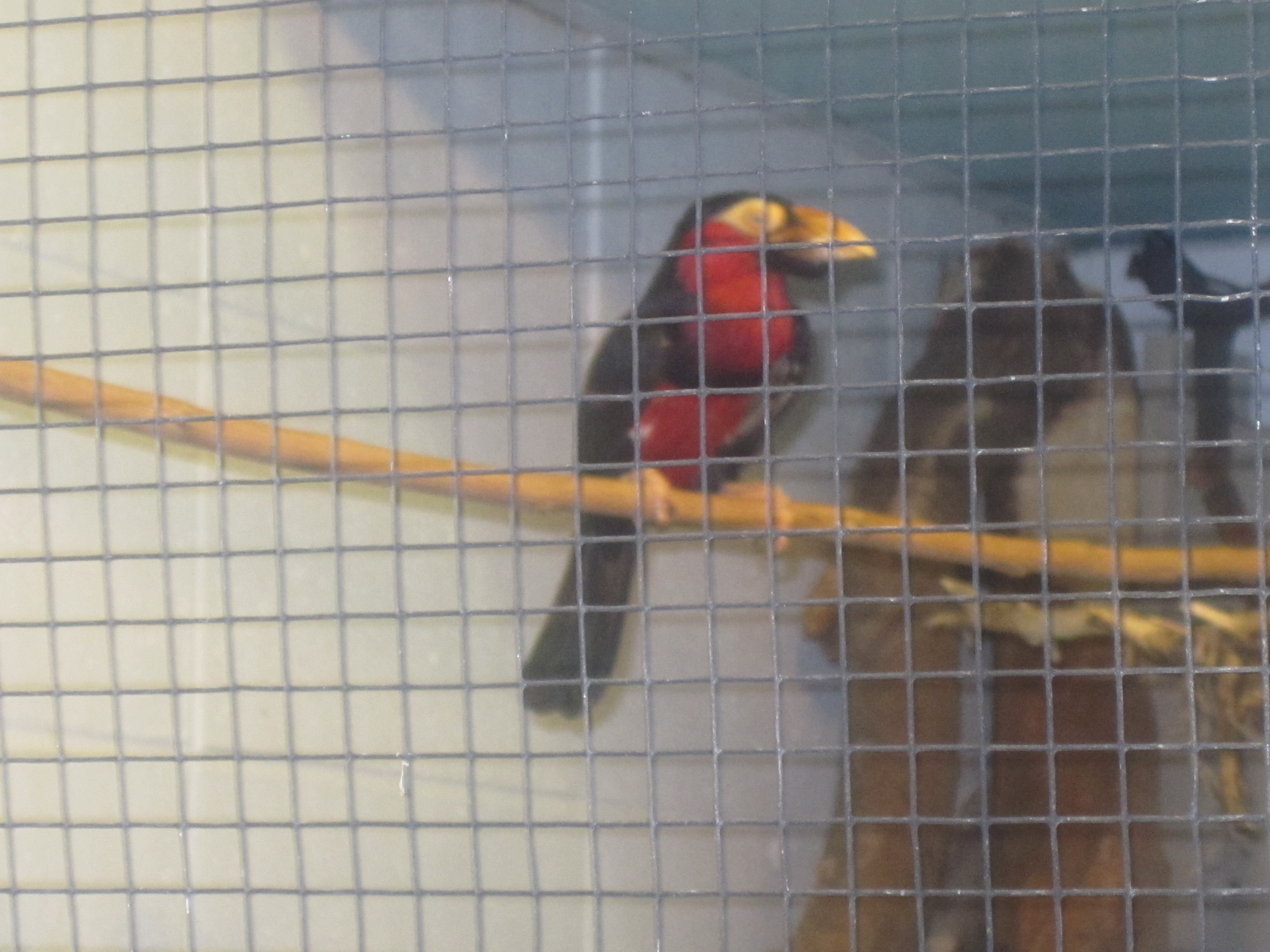
Bearded barbet
