= Windsor Hotel (Garden City, Kansas) =

- U.S. National Register of Historic Places
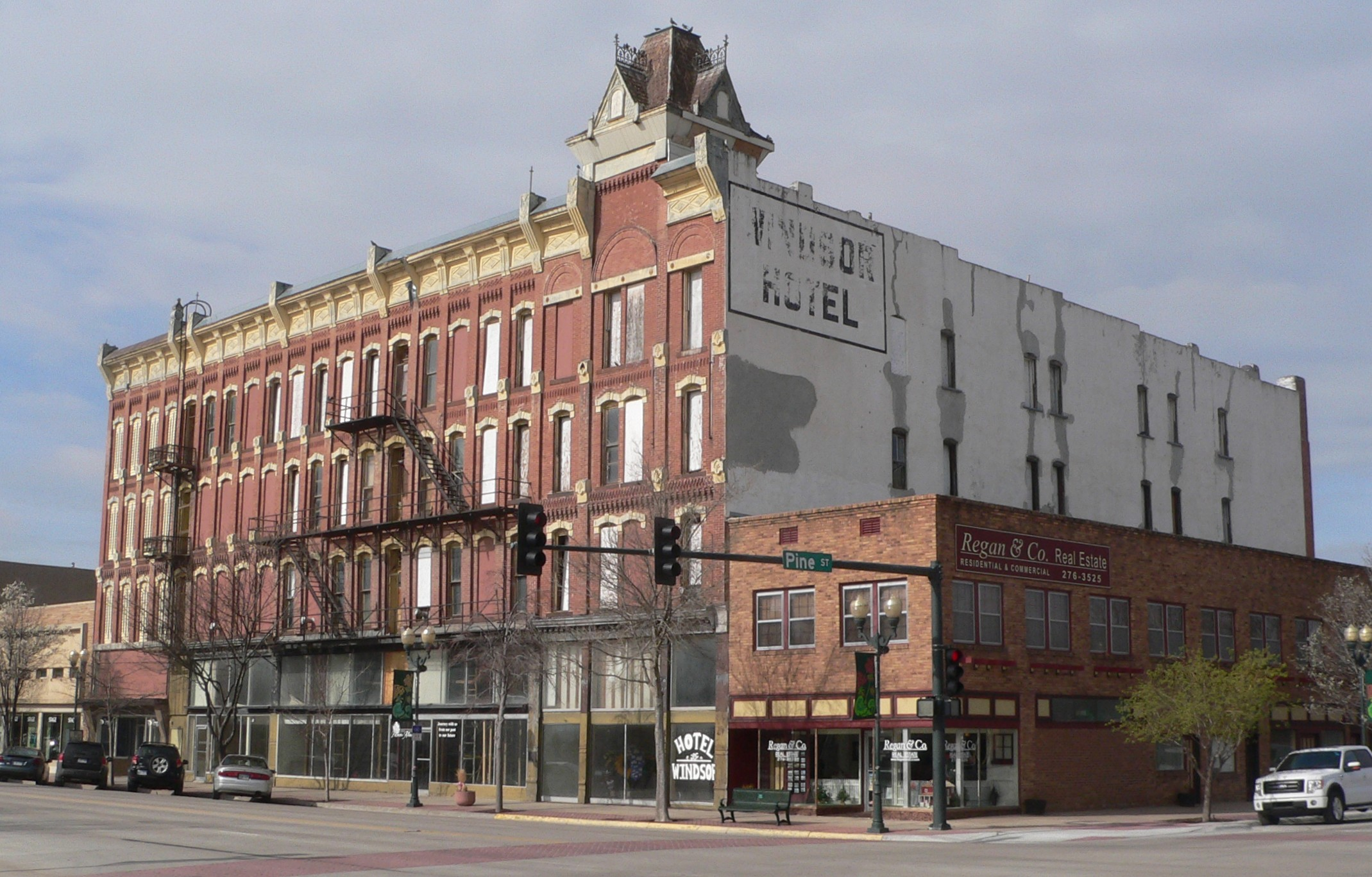
- Windsor Hotel in 2015

- Location within Kansas Location within the United States
- Location: 421 N. Main St., Garden City, Kansas
- Coordinates: 37°58′06″N 100°52′26″W
- Area: 1 acre (0.40 ha)
- Built: 1887
- Built by: Stevens, J.H.; Thompson, C.L.
- Architectural style: Renaissance
- NRHP reference No.: 72000498
- Added to NRHP: April 26, 1972

The Windsor Hotel in Garden City, Kansas, is located at 421 N. Main St. It was built in 1887. In 1972 it was listed on the National Register of Historic Places.

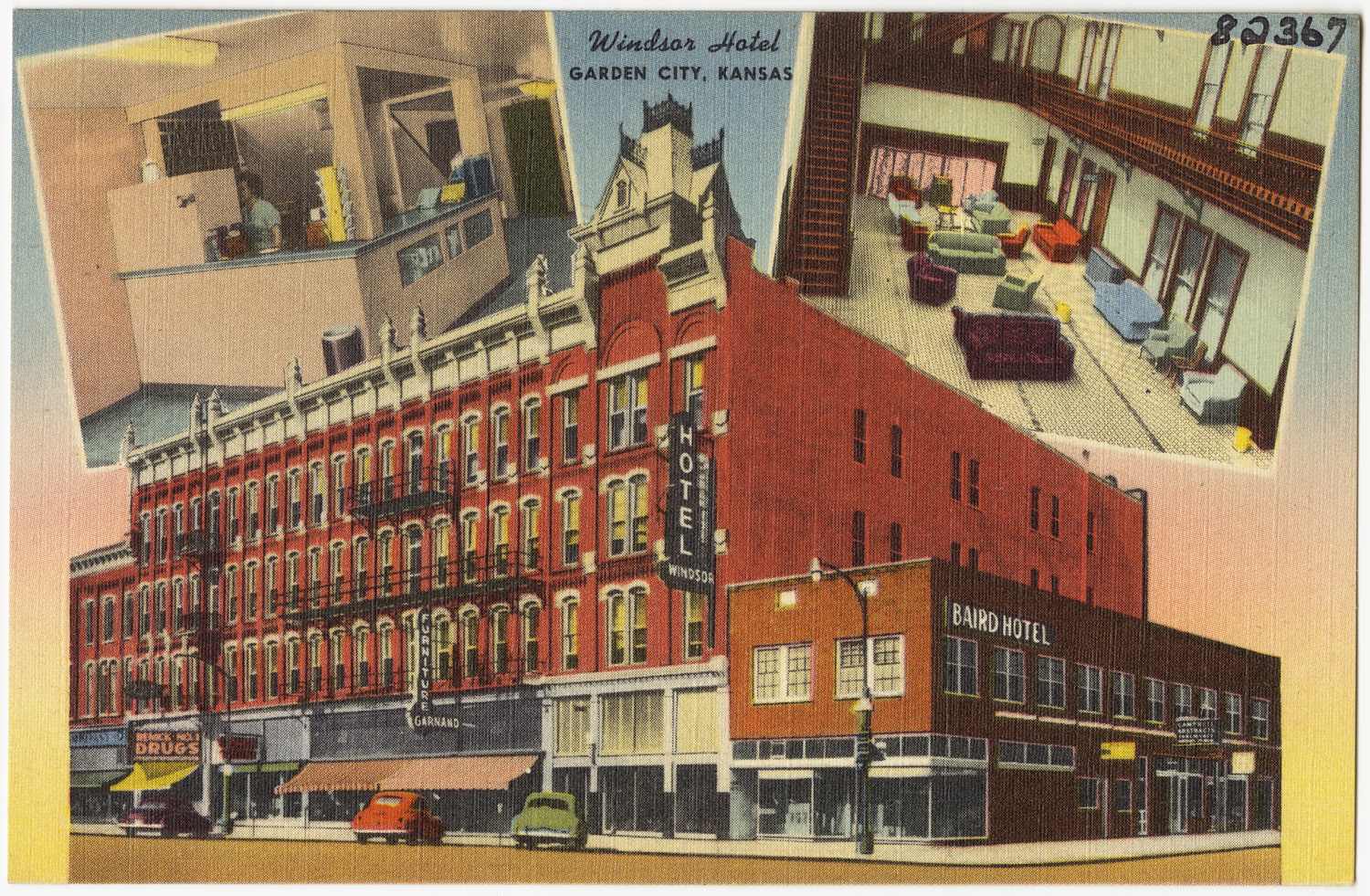
Windsor Hotel on a postcard (c. 1930–1945)

It is a four-story building with a basement which is about 120 by 100 feet (37 m × 30 m) in plan and 55 feet (17 m) tall. Its exterior walls are of local red brick and native limestone.
