= Lamar station (Amtrak) =

Train station in Lamar, Colorado, United States

Lamar, CO
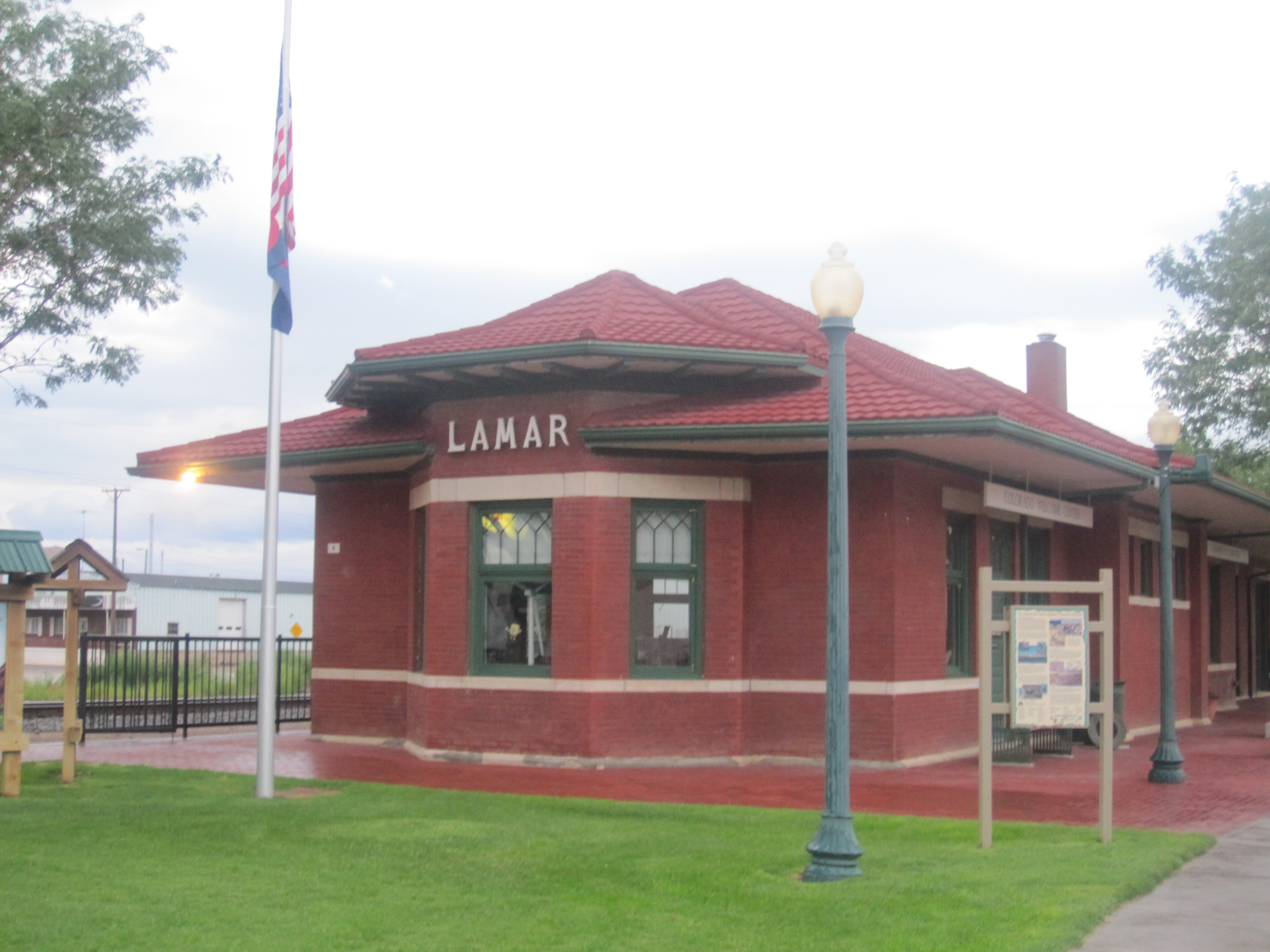
- Lamar Amtrak station and Visitor Center.

General information
- Location: Main and Beach Streets; Lamar, Colorado
- Coordinates: 38.0897°N 102.6185°W
- Owner: City of Lamar
- Line: BNSF La Junta Subdivision
- Platforms: 1 side platform
- Tracks: 1

Other information
- Station code: Amtrak: LMR

History
- Opened: 1907

Passengers
- FY 2025: 1,406 (Amtrak)

Services
Preceding station	Amtrak	Following station
La Junta toward Los Angeles	Southwest Chief	Garden City toward Chicago
Former services
Preceding station	Atchison, Topeka and Santa Fe Railway	Following station
Prowers toward Los Angeles	Main Line	Granada toward Chicago
- Atchison, Topeka and Santa Fe Railway Passenger Depot
- U.S. National Register of Historic Places
- Location: Lamar, Colorado
- NRHP reference No.: 100004186
- Added to NRHP: July 19, 2019
Location

Lamar station is a train station in Lamar, Colorado served by Amtrak. It is served by Amtrak's Southwest Chief line. It was originally built in 1907 by the Atchison, Topeka and Santa Fe Railway. The current station is designed in a manner similar to that of Garden City station in Kansas, and also serves as the Lamar Visitor Center. In 2019 it was added to the National Register of Historic Places.

== See also ==
- List of Amtrak stations
