= Garden City station (Kansas) =

Train station in Garden City, Kansas, US

Garden City, KS
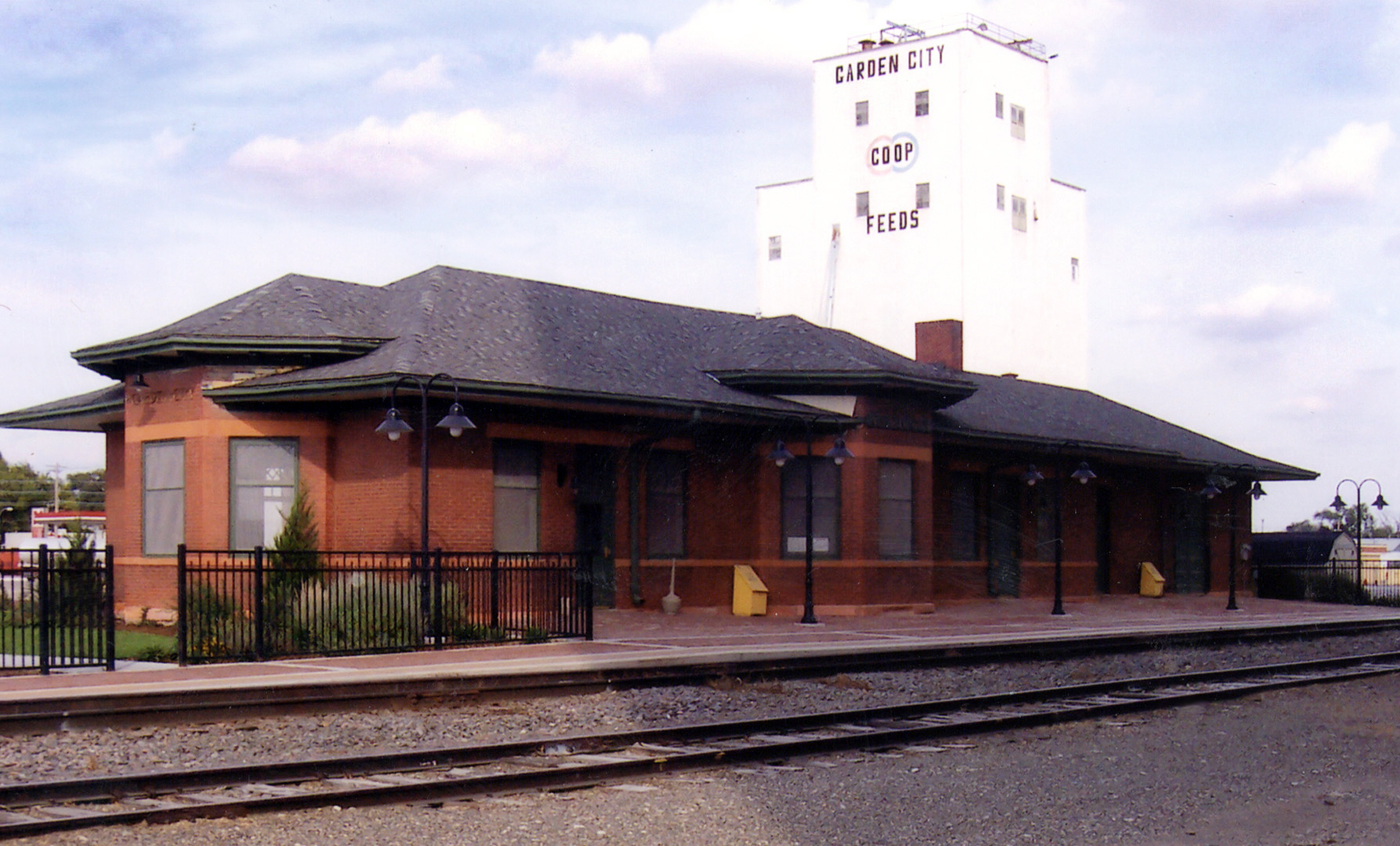
- Garden City station in 2008

General information
- Location: 100 North 7th Street; Garden City, Kansas
- Coordinates: 37.9642°N 100.8732°W
- Line: BNSF La Junta Subdivision
- Platforms: 1 side platform
- Tracks: 2
- Connections: Finney County Transit

Other information
- Station code: Amtrak: GCK

History
- Opened: 1907
- Rebuilt: 1957, 2002

Passengers
- FY 2025: 6,517 (Amtrak)

Services
Preceding station	Amtrak	Following station
Lamar toward Los Angeles	Southwest Chief	Dodge City toward Chicago
Former services
Preceding station	Atchison, Topeka and Santa Fe Railway	Following station
Holcomb toward Los Angeles	Main Line	Pierceville toward Chicago
Terminus	Garden City – Great Bend	Gillespie toward Great Bend
Location

Garden City station is a train station in Garden City, Kansas, United States, served by the daily Amtrak Southwest Chief. It is located in downtown Garden City along the BNSF Railway La Junta Subdivision. Garden City station was originally built in 1907 by the Atchison, Topeka and Santa Fe Railway and upon the restoration of 2002, was declared a historic landmark by the Finney County Preservation Alliance.
