= Finney County Transit =

Provider of mass transportation in Finney County, Kansas

- Headquarters: 1008 N 11th
- Locale: Garden City, Kansas
- Service area: Finney County, Kansas
- Service type: Bus service, paratransit
- Routes: 4
- Stops: 65
- Hubs: FCT Center
- Fleet: 9 buses
- Annual ridership: 71,669 (2024)
- Website: Finney County Transit

Finney County Transit is the primary provider of mass transportation in Garden City, Kansas with four "City Link" branded routes serving the region. As of 2024, the system provided 71,669 rides over 19,249 annual vehicle revenue hours with 9 buses and 5 paratransit vehicles.

== History ==
From 1887 to 1891, public transit in Garden City was provided by horsecars operated by the Garden Street Railway Co. City Link fixed route bus service in Garden City began on August 1, 2007.

== Service ==
Finney County Transit operates four regular weekday bus routes, branded as City Link, on a pulse system with all routes departing hourly from the FCT Center.

Hours of operation for the system are Monday through Friday from 6:00 A.M. to 7:00 P.M. There is no service on Saturdays and Sundays. Regular fares are $1.00.

=== Routes ===
- Green Route
- Red Route
- Orange Route
- Blue Route

== Fixed route ridership ==
The ridership statistics shown here are of fixed route services only and do not include demand response services.

== See also ==
- List of bus transit systems in the United States
- D-TRAN
- Garden City station
