= Belleville Township, Kansas =

Belleville Township may refer to:

- Belleville Township, Chautauqua County, Kansas
- Belleville Township, Republic County, Kansas

== See also ==
- List of Kansas townships
- Belleville Township (disambiguation)
