= Blackwell gunfight =

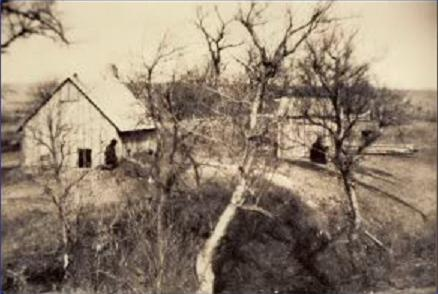
- The location of the gunfight.
- Date: December 4, 1896
- Location: Near Blackwell, Oklahoma Territory, United States
- Outcome: Outlaws defeated
- Deaths: 1
- Injuries: 1

The Blackwell gunfight occurred on the morning of December 4, 1896, when a posse of American lawmen confronted two bandits at their hideout near Blackwell, Oklahoma. During a lengthy shootout that followed, Deputy Alfred O. Lund killed an outlaw named Dick Ainsley while the other outlaw, Ben Cravens, was badly wounded and captured.

== Background ==
Ben Cravens and Dick Ainsley were petty thieves and or cattle rustlers, although the latter had also developed a reputation as a gunman. Little is known about their lives before 1896, except that Ainsley also went by the name of "Buck" McGregg or "Diamond Dick," the latter because he had a diamond ring and three of his fingers shot away during a gunfight with Lincoln County policemen. On November 27, 1896, Ainsley and Cravens rode into Blackwell to purchase supplies and to case the town bank for a robbery. After completing their tasks, they then rode out of town to a small one-room shack next to a wooded ravine called Lost Creek. The location was about three and one half miles northwest of town. Because the creek was dry and the site lacked a well, Cravens went to ask the neighbor, Bert Benjamin, for some drinking water. During the conversation that followed, Cravens asked Benjamin several questions about the inside of the bank, which revealed his true intentions for being in the area. Benjamin did, however, reply casually and, on the following day, he went to tell the police about what had happened.

The sheriff's deputy, J. R. Cox, was certain that Ainsley and Cravens were responsible for a recent robbery at a store in Hewins, Kansas, but, instead of organizing a posse immediately, he told Benjamin to go home and report back to him if he saw anything more of the bandits. So, on December 3, 1896, after sighting Ainsley and Cravens again, Benjamin reported back to Cox, who then raised a posse of six men, including himself. The other possemen were Alfred O. Lund, Bill Sherr, John Hunter, Jay McClain, and Richard Clarke. Lund, who became a lawman as result of the shootout, had always been interested in law enforcement, although he was beaten in past elections to determine the new city marshal and town constable of Blackwell. He was the owner of a livery stable, but the presence of Ainsley and Cravens gave him an opportunity to pursue a career in law enforcement, without having to be elected.

At about midnight, the posse took up positions along a riverbank outside of town so they could ambush the outlaws when they rode in. Their plans were thwarted though when Bert Benjamin arrived and told them that Ainsley and Cravens were sleeping at the shack near his home. Because there was a risk of civilians being harmed in the event of a gunfight in the town's streets, Deputy Cox asked Benjamin to lead him and his men to the hideout. By 3:00 am, on December 4, 1896, the posse had made it to the wooded ravine, but found that the outlaws had a guard dog. Now that surprising the outlaws was no longer an option, Cox decided to split his men up to surround the place and wait until daylight to demand a surrender. Lund, Benjamin, Sherr and McClain then maneuvered through some brush to a point that covered the front door and window of the shack while Cox, Hunter, and Clarke went around back to watch the backside of the building and a small barn, where the outlaws had left their horses.

== Gunfight ==
At sunrise, Dick Ainsley was spotted by the posse when he went outside the front door of the shack with a Winchester rifle in his hands. Ainsley first had a look around and then he leaned his rifle up against the shack to wash his hands. A moment later, Ben Cravens appeared at the front of the cabin, also with a rifle in hand. This was the chance Cox was waiting for. With both of the outlaws in view, Cox stood up from his hiding place and shouted: "You're surrounded, throw up your hands!" But, instead of heeding to the sheriff's demand, the outlaws raised their weapons and began firing. After the first shots, Bert Benjamin fired both barrels from his shotgun and then headed for home, apparently in fear, leaving Alfred Lund alone at his position in front of the shack. From there Lund had a good vantage point and could see how ineffective the rest of the posse's fire was, being that they were armed mainly with shotguns, which did not have the necessary range. Cravens was the first to be wounded. He was running for the corner of the shack when a rifle bullet broke his collar bone. Although seriously hurt, Cravens survived the initial shock and continued to fight on.

Sometime later, Lund spotted Ainsley's rifle barrel protruding out from behind the corner of the shack. He then opened fire with his rifle and forced the bandit to retreat to some cottonwood trees in the dry creek. There Ainsley displayed some "fast hip shooting" before moving behind a fallen tree, where he waited for any of the lawmen to advance, hoping to outflank and ambush them. Lund was one step ahead of him though and, while Ainsley was waiting in ambush, Lund got the drop on him and proceeded to sneak forward to force a surrender. Before he could say anything, however, Ainsley spotted the advancing lawman and went for his gun. Lund then fired and struck Ainsley in the chest, but he did not die immediately and Lund wasn't sure if his shot reached its target. Also, the bullet that struck Ainsley passed straight through his body and killed a cow about fifty yards further up the ravine.

Meanwhile, the rest of the possemen were going after Ben Cravens, who was trying to escape through some tall grass on the eastern side of the creek. At the same time Ainsley was wounded, Richard Clarke struck Cravens in the side with a load of buckshot and he fell to the ground, concealed in the grass. It took some time before the possemen were able to find where the outlaws had fallen and relieve them of their weapons. During the search, Cox and his men heard the wounded Ainsley groaning and mistook him for Lund. They called out to him to see if he was okay, but the real Lund did not reply because he was afraid that it was a trick by Cravens. It was not until Lund overheard the possemen talking about where they had found Cravens that he knew who they were. Lund then ordered one of the men to find Ainsley and take his guns while he went to the eastern side of the creek to find Cravens. When he arrived in the area, Lund had one of the others fire towards the concealed Cravens, causing him to put his hand up above the grass and identify himself. The posse demanded that Cravens show both of his hands, but, after sneaking closer, they found the outlaw badly hurt, his other hand being used to hold his wounds.

== Aftermath ==
Once Ainsley was dead and Cravens was in custody, Deputy Cox sent Lund into Blackwell to telephone his superior, Sheriff H. C. Master, the county attorney, Dave Weir, and the coroner from Ponca City. Ainsley's body was taken to the Blackwell Hotel and Cravens was held in a third-story room of the same building. During the following interrogation, Cravens refused to give out any information about his dead partner, except to say that his name was Dick. This made authorities believe they had killed "Dynamite Dick" Clifton, a member of the Wild Bunch, who was also missing three fingers like Ainsley. The real "Dynamite Dick" was killed in November 1897 by Chris Madsen. Because of the confusion, the United States Marshals office in Guthrie was informed and Marshal Evett Dumas Nix led five deputies to Blackwell, one of whom was Frank M. Canton. When they arrived, the marshals were taken to see Ainsley's body and the first thing Nix said was "I don't know this man, but he isn't Dan Clifton." When they entered Cravens' room, the outlaw looked up and asked: "What do you want?" Canton replied: "The name of the dead man." Cravens then began coughing up blood so Canton asked if there was anything that could be done. Cravens responded, saying: "Yes, get my father here because I'm real bad and the doctors said I might not make it." Canton agreed and Cravens' father arrived from Iowa two days later, however, Cravens would survive his wounds and Canton never received an answer. Even though Marshal Nix was sure that Ainsley was not Dan Clifton, there remained some speculation for a while afterward. People who viewed Ainsley's corpse claimed that he was "Skeeter Dick", "Three Fingered Dick", or some other desperado of little repute. Eventually, however, Cravens spoke up and confirmed that his partner was, in fact, Dick Ainsley, or Buck McGregg. Also, Ainsley's mother arrived in Blackwell, escorted by two Lincoln County sheriffs, and claimed the body of her son to take him home for burial.

While the outlaws were in the Blackwell Hotel, rumors began circulating through town that their friends would attempt a rescue. Therefore, local citizens were deputized, armed, and positioned in the streets for defense. Although no rescue attempt was made, two "female bandits" arrived in town and began asking questions about Ainsley and Cravens. A December 11 edition of the Kildare Journal said the following: "Two rough and rugged females who arrived in Blackwell Monday [December 7, 1896] armed to the teeth, threw the town into spasms of excitement by their strange behavior and their suspicious inquiries concerning Cravens and "Dynamite Dick" [Dick Ainsley], the outlaws. The females were duly arrested and searched. Certain ladies who were deputized to do the searching came near to fainting away from fright. Blackwell citizens paraded the streets armed with Winchesters, anxiously on the lookout for a raid from friends of the outlaw. The females claimed to be from Guthrie."

Cravens was taken back to Kansas under the custody of a Deputy Powell and, in January 1897, the judge presiding over his case sentenced him to twenty years at the Kansas State Penitentiary in Lansing. Three years later, however, on November 16, 1900, Cravens escaped with a fake gun, made out of a piece of wood and some tin foil from tobacco packages. He evaded a posse, stole a horse, and was soon back in the Osage Nation committing crimes. He also convinced a young horse thief named Herbert Welty to join him. On March 18, 1901, the two bandits robbed a company store in Red Rock and killed the manager, Alvin Bateman. Cravens was disguised as a farmer and Welty posed as his wife. The trick did not work so well though because Batemen discovered their true identities and was shot down when he tried to draw his sidearm. After stealing about $1,000 and some other items, Cravens and Welty escaped on a wagon, but, somewhere just outside town, their vehicle overturned and Welty was shot in the face by his partner's shotgun. It remains uncertain if it was an accident or an attempted murder committed by Cravens, who may have wanted all of the loot for himself. Cravens left Welty for dead, but he survived his wound and walked ten to fifteen miles to a home along Black Bear Creek, where he was arrested. Welty later received a life sentence in prison for the death of Bateman. Cravens fled to the home of a friend, Isom Cunningham, a few miles south of Pawnee, where he was surrounded by a posse. He did, however, manage to shoot his way out of what was described as "a perfect hailstorm of bullets," killing a deputy sheriff named Tom Johnson in the process. Another lawman, Deputy Jack Murray, said the following: "The rapidity with which he [Cravens] worked his artillery was such that the firing made a continuous sheet of flame." Darlene Platt wrote: "Cravens emptied his rifle, fell to the ground, reloaded, came back up and emptied it again followed by his revolver." At this point, Cravens disappeared and the reward offered for him went from $1,000 to $10,000, making him one of the most wanted outlaws in the territory. He resurfaced though in November 1908, when he was arrested in Missouri for stealing either a horse or some hogs, depending on differing accounts. At the time, Cravens was using the name Charles Maust and said he came to Missouri from Oregon in 1902. He had worked as a farmer for six years, married, and was considered a respectable citizen, at least until his arrest. Nobody recognized him at first so he was sentenced to four years at the prison in Jefferson City. However, not long before he was to be released, a prison barber recognized Cravens and informed his superiors. A trial was then held in Guthrie, Oklahoma and, because Cravens refused to give his real name, the authorities began assembling more than 200 witnesses, many of whom were known outlaws. Among the witnesses were Marshal Alfred O. Lund, who was days away from retiring, and Herbert Welty, Cravens' old associate. Also, Cravens was defended by Al Jennings, a reformed outlaw who was pardoned by Theodore Roosevelt. Both Lund and Welty identified Maust as Ben Cravens so he was sentenced to life in prison at Fort Leavenworth, Kansas on January 29, 1912. Lund's involvement in Cravens' final conviction was significant in that he was the first lawman in Oklahoma history to have both begun and ended his career confronting the same criminal.

== See also ==
- List of Old West gunfights
