= Monett, Kansas =

Unincorporated community in Chautauqua County, Kansas

Coordinates: 37°08′40″N 96°06′21″W

Monett is an unincorporated community in Sedan Township of Chautauqua County, Kansas, United States.

== History ==
A post office was first opened in Mount Vernon (an extinct town), but it was moved to Monett in 1887 and remained in operation until it was discontinued in 1918.
