= Hendricks Township, Kansas =

Hendricks Township
- Township
- Location in Chautauqua County
- Coordinates: 37°03′10″N 096°18′51″W
- Country: United States
- State: Kansas
- County: Chautauqua

Area
  - Total: 54.96 sq mi (142.34 km^{2})
  - Land: 54.93 sq mi (142.27 km^{2})
  - Water: 0.027 sq mi (0.07 km^{2}) 0.05%
- Elevation: 1,040 ft (317 m)

Population (2020)
  - Total: 108
  - Density: 2.1/sq mi (0.8/km^{2})
- GNIS feature ID: 0469131

Hendricks Township is a township in Chautauqua County, Kansas, United States. As of the 2020 census, its population was 108.

== Geography ==
Hendricks Township covers an area of 54.96 square miles (142.3 km^{2}) and contains one incorporated settlement, Elgin. According to the USGS, it contains four cemeteries: De Busk, Elgin, Moore Prairie and Wilson.

The streams of Buzzard Creek, Grant Creek, Little Cedar Creek, Sycamore Creek and West Cedar Creek run through this township.
