= Osro =

Osro may refer to:

- Osro Cobb (1904–1996), American lawyer, politician, and jurist
- Osro, Kansas, unincorporated community, United States

== See also ==
- Khosrow (disambiguation)
