= Wauneta =

Wauneta may refer to the following places in the United States:

- Wauneta, Colorado
- Wauneta, Kansas
- Wauneta, Nebraska
