= Pawnee Agency and Boarding School Historic District =

Historic district in Oklahoma, United States

- Pawnee Agency and Boarding School District
- U.S. National Register of Historic Places
- U.S. Historic district
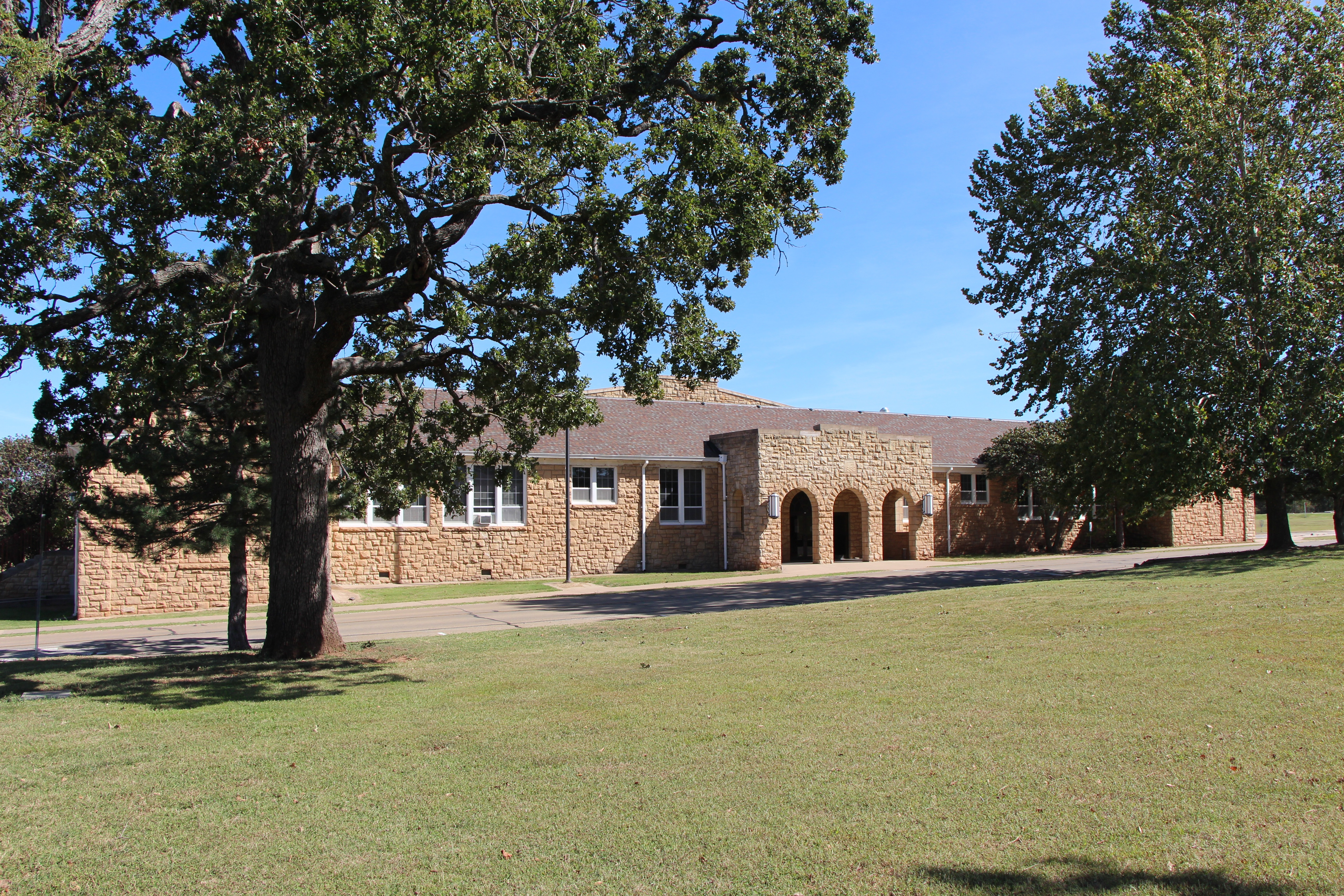
- Original school building, now the Bureau of Indian Affairs

- Location within Oklahoma Location within the United States
- Location: Pawnee, Oklahoma
- Coordinates: 36°20′8″N 96°47′24″W
- Area: 29 acres (12 ha)
- Built: 1932; 94 years ago
- NRHP reference No.: 00001577
- Added to NRHP: December 28, 2000

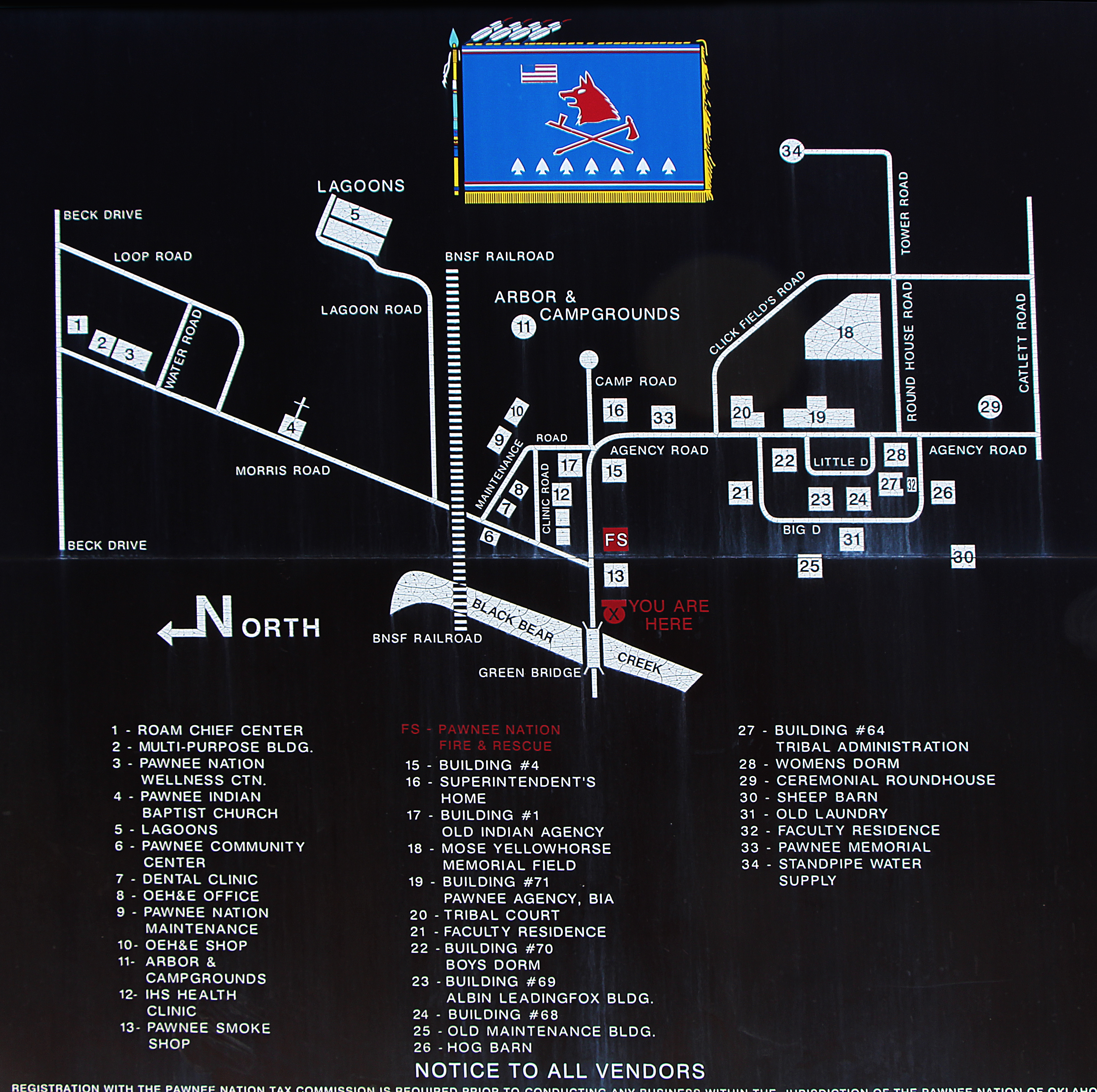
Map of the Boarding School Historic District

The Pawnee Agency and Boarding School District lies east of the city of Pawnee in Pawnee County, Oklahoma. Other names are: Pawnee Indian Agency, Pawnee Indian School and Pawnee Indian Boarding School. The District occupies approximately 29 acres (12 ha) of the Pawnee Tribal Reserve, a 726 acres (294 ha) tract that is owned by the Pawnee tribe. Black Bear Creek divides the District from the town. The Pawnee Agency was established as a post office on May 4, 1876.

== History of the Pawnee School in Indian Territory ==
The policy of the U.S. Government toward the Native Americans was to get them to accept allotment (ownership of tribal land by individual tribesmen) and American style education. Together, these two things were expected to end the tribes' dependence on the American government. Toward that end, the government had built schools on Pawnee land in Nebraska Territory, where most of the tribe lived by the time of the American Civil War. Treaties between the U.S. and the Pawnees had established that the latter would cede their lands in Nebraska to the government and move to an area the government had designated for them in Indian Territory. The removal had been scheduled for 1876. The industrial school in Nebraska Territory operated by the government for the Pawnees closed in September 1875, since holding classes would be impractical during the move. (Note: Two teachers from the Nebraska school had volunteered to move to a school that was planned for the new location.)

For various bureaucratic reasons, the planned boarding schools could not be ready as soon as the tribe arrived at their destination. However, it was possible to open two day schools in February 1876. These could provide only an elementary level of education. Government policy makers held that a hierarchical system would produce satisfactory results. Day schools would introduce children to the English language and basic primary education. Those children who made satisfactory progress would move on to boarding schools, Boarding schools would continue the primary subjects, add more advanced topics and focus half of each day on "industrial education." Off-reservation schools offered more advanced education and industrial training.

Although planning for the boarding school was well advanced in February 1876, construction funding had not been approved. An 1857 treaty had appropriated ten thousand dollars a year to operate two industrial education (manual labor) schools. The Pawnees had expected to use the unexpended portion of the money to construct the new school. The government's Indian Office held that the funds were only to support existing schools, not to build new ones. By the summer of 1877, the Indian Office finally agreed that not using the funds to build the new school meant that the Pawnees would have no school, therefore abrogating the treaty. The construction contract was awarded shortly after. The new school building and girls' dormitory were completed in May, 1878. However, other delays ensued. A cistern dug near the school leaked all its water. Later, it was determined that the cement used in its construction was still "green" (uncured) when water first filled the cistern. This was repaired, but purchasing school supplies was delayed in the Fall by bureaucratic delays getting the required approvals. School finally opened on November 11, 1878.

McClure documents complaints and problems that cropped up after the school opened. One was overcrowding. Agents regularly requested funding for a second school, as promised in the 1857 treaty. No such action was ever taken. In 1884, the Agent reported that the water supply had always been inadequate; water of poor quality had to be hauled from a source a half mile away. Official visitors found 39 girls sharing 13 beds in 1889. The sewage system was inadequate as late as 1900. (Note: Apparently the sewer system was restored to good condition by 1903.) Despite the lack of a satisfactory sewer system, there was a new building program during the 1890s that resulted in the construction of a commissary and carpenters' shop (1891) and the Boys' Dormitory (1892).

The original Boys' Dormitory was destroyed by a fire in 1904. There were no deaths or injuries, but the monetary loss was estimated at 25 to 30 thousand dollars. The school sent some of the youngest boys back home and housed the remainder in other buildings. The administration also concerned itself about fire safety measures in other buildings. The burned building was replaced in 1909.

The boarding school finally closed in 1958. The Bureau of Indian Affairs (BIA) took possession of all the school's buildings. (Note: The BIA then allowed a charitable service, The Good Samaritans, to use the 1932 School Building as a nursing home.)

In 2011, the Oklahoma Historical Society's Historic Preservation Office awarded its Citation of Merit for the rehabilitation of three buildings of the former boarding school. The buildings were: the former staff quarters, the dining hall and Pawnee Indian Clinic. All three now serve the new Pawnee Nation College. Recipients of the award were the Pawnee Business Council, Barrett L. Williamson Architects, and Builders Unlimited.

=== Pawnee Agency Organization ===
When the Pawnees came to Indian Territory, the Pawnee Agency reported directly to the Indian Office. By 1883, the Pawnee Agency was consolidated with the Otoe and Ponca agencies, and relocated to the community of Whiteeagle. The Tonkawa Agency was united with the other three agencies in 1886. A single agent oversaw the activities of the consolidated agency, and only a clerk was left at the Pawnee reservation to handle day-to-day administration there. The Indian Office transferred all the administrative duties for the Pawnee tribe to the Pawnee School Superintendent. Previously, the Pawnee Agent was also responsible for the Oakland, Otoe and Ponca tribes. These duties were removed in 1902, leaving the school superintendent of the school and Pawnee tribe administration. In 1920, the Indian Office returned the Ponca and Otoe tribes to the responsibility of the Pawnee Agency, and added the Tonkawas as well. In 1927, the Pawnee agent was made responsible for dealings with the Pawnees, Poncas, Kaws, Otoe-Missourias and Tonkawas. The organization remained stable until the Pawnee Agency was made part of the Western Oklahoma Consolidated Agency at Anadarko in 1947. In 1950, the government established an Area Field Office at Anadarko, leaving a field agent in the Pawnee community.

== NRHP listing ==
The Pawnee Agency and Boarding School District was added to the National Register of Historic Places (NRHP) on December 28, 2000, with registration number 00001577. The Pawnee Indian Agency and Superintendent's house, also within the District, were listed on the National Register of Historic Places (NRHP) in 1973, under Criteria A and C. (Note: NRHP Criterion A is "…property that is associated with events that have made a significant contribution to the broad sweep of our history." Criterion C is "Property embodies the distinctive characteristics of a type, period, or method of construction or represents the work of a master, or possesses high artistic value, a significant and distinguishable entity whose components lack individual distinction.") The period of significance is defined by the District NRHP application as 1876 to 1950. There are a total of 20 additional buildings/structures that are "contributing", and nine "non-contributing" buildings/structures in the District. "Non-contributing" structures are either modern or have obscure histories.

== Contributing buildings ==
=== Pawnee Agency Office ===
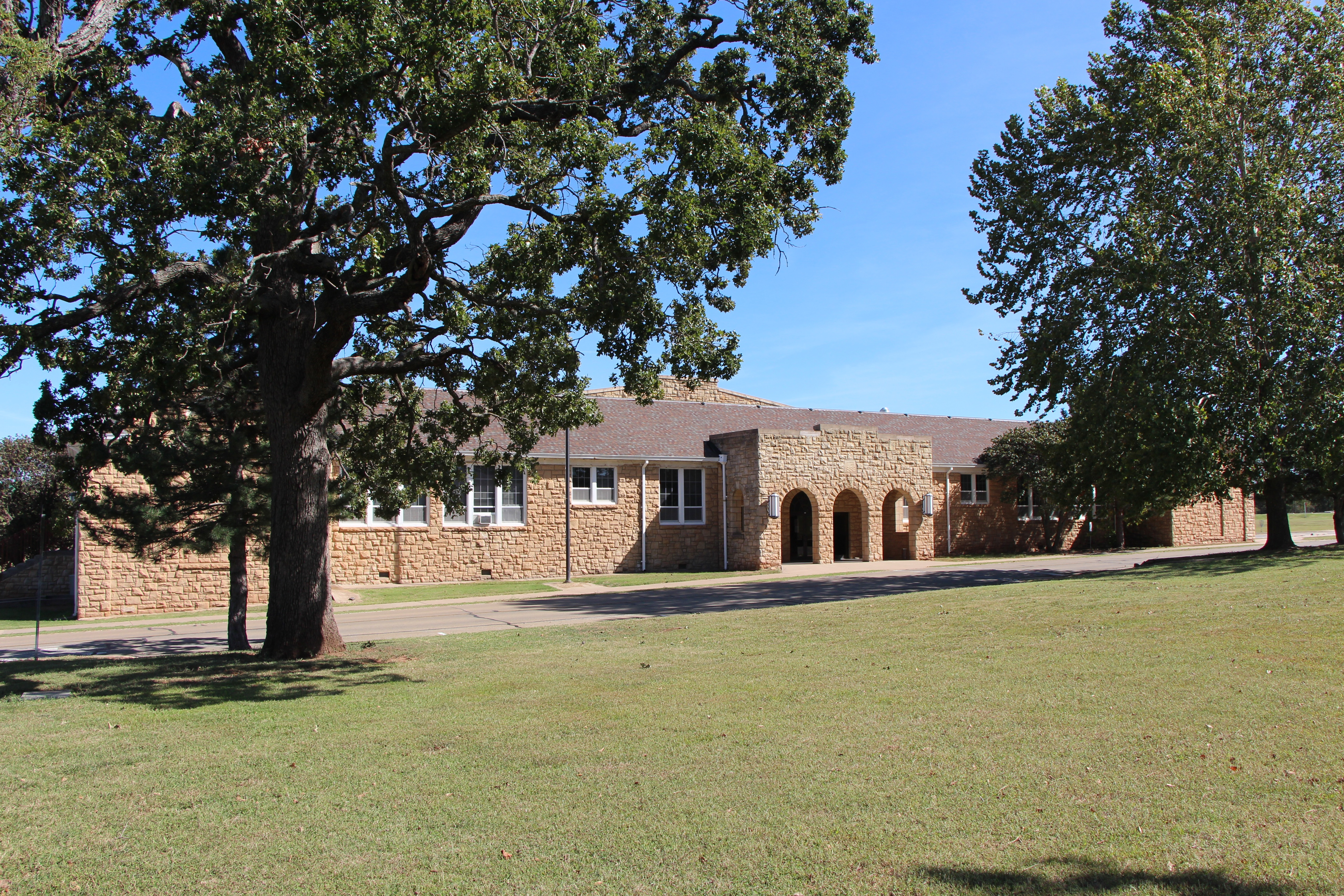
1906 Pawnee Agency Office. Photo taken October 4, 2014.

The Pawnee Agency Office is a one-story building that was constructed about 1906. The NRHP application says that: "The 1876 Annual Report of the Commissioner of Indian Affairs mentions only one stone building and it seems more likely that this describes the Superintendent's Residence, as it refers to a combination office and dwelling." The building was being used for tribal offices and storage at the time of the NRHP Application.

The main part of the building is a hall and parlor, covered with quarry-faced, coursed, ashlar sandstone blocks, and has a full porch, with simple supports and a balustrade made of pipe. The back of the building has a gable- roofed, stone extension at the northwest corner, added in 1928. A small concrete vault with a hip roof was added in 1914, and a wood frame extension was added to the northeast corner at an unknown date.

McGuire quoted the Superintendent's report as saying,"...a fine stone building containing a room each for the superintendent, clerk, financial clerk and stenographer, and a waiting room for the Indians." In 1914, a two-room addition was built, along with a vault and a toilet. In 1916, a cellar and a hot water heating system were added to the building.

The work load had increased, increasing the needs for more staff and records storage space. The Agency requested funding for a replacement building, but it was never built. By 1973, the Agency moved its operations to a building in downtown Pawnee, and the U.S. Public Health Service had leased the former agency office building for use as a pharmacy. By 2000, the Pawnee tribe was using the building for office space.

=== Superintendent's Building ===
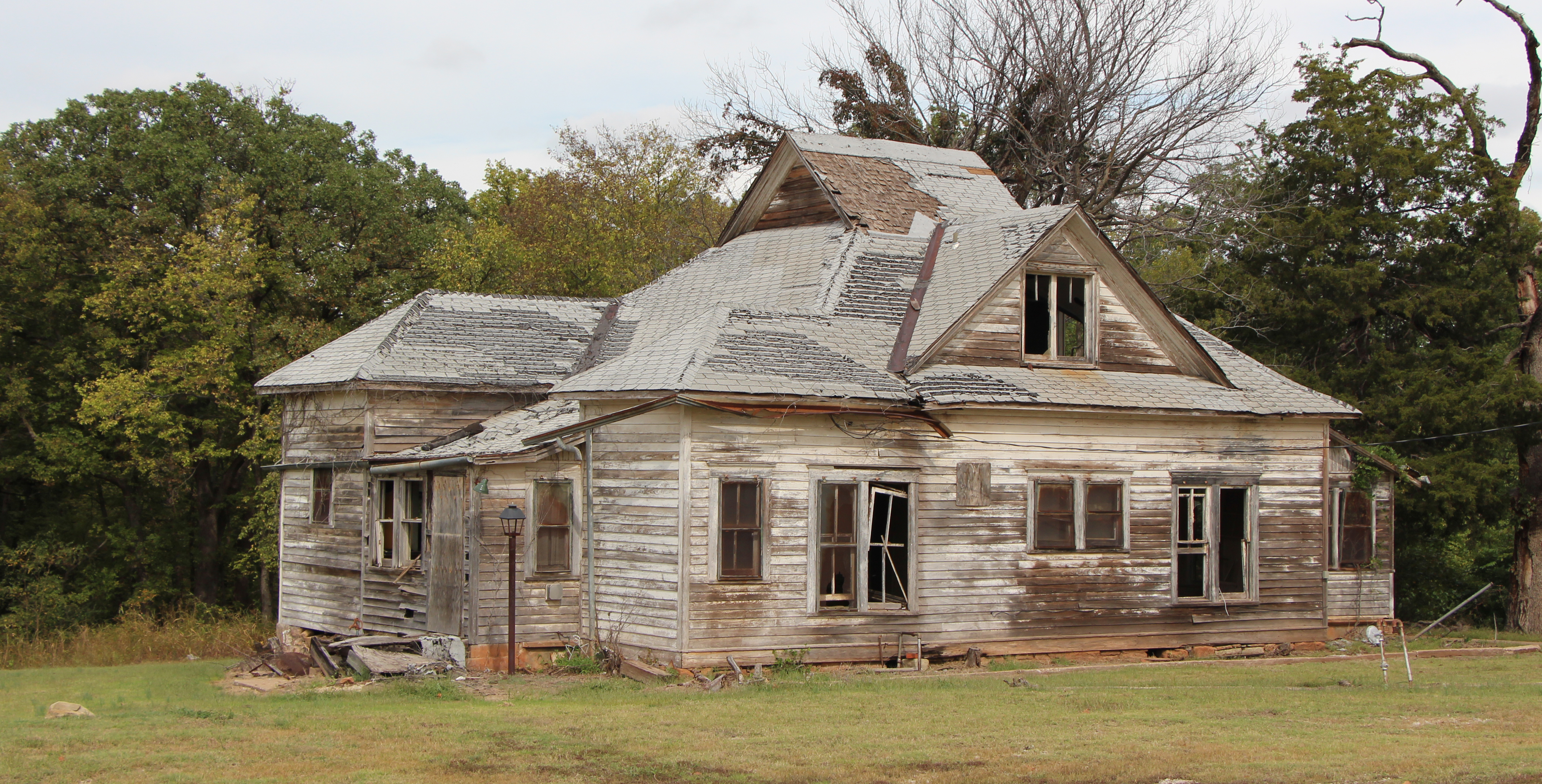
Superintendent's Building (now vacant), Built 1876. Photo taken October 13, 2014

This is the oldest building in the district, having been constructed in 1876. The Superintendent's Building was unoccupied at the time of the NRHP application, when reported some significant structural damage parts of it. Originally built as an office and residence for the Indian Agent, it became the office and residence for the school superintendent around the turn of the 20th century, giving it its current name. It is a two-story structure, built in Queen Anne style, of cured ashlar sandstone. It has a wrap-around porch supported by wooden columns which rest on stone piers. This is not the original porch, but a replacement constructed in 1916. A porte-cochere was added to the west side of the building sometime after 1916. The building also has a front-facing gable and a side-facing gable There is a kitchen with a shed roof on the south side and a hip-roofed room in the L-shaped space formed by the kitchen and the side-facing gable wing. Both of these additions are roofed with green composition shingles, while the main building has asbestos shingles. Originally, these structures had wood-shingle roofs.

According to McClure, this building was rented out as a private residence by 1973, when the building was listed separately on the NRHP. By the time McClure submitted her thesis (May 2000), it was unoccupied. She described its physical condition as "poor" because the many broken windows, though covered with boards, had admitted wind and rain; there were significant cracks in the floor slab and the stem walls; (Note: Stem walls secure the vertical walls to the foundation and also protect the vertical walls from cracking.) the basement walls were no longer watertight and the porte cochere roof was collapsing from rot.

=== Pawnee-Ponca Hospital ===
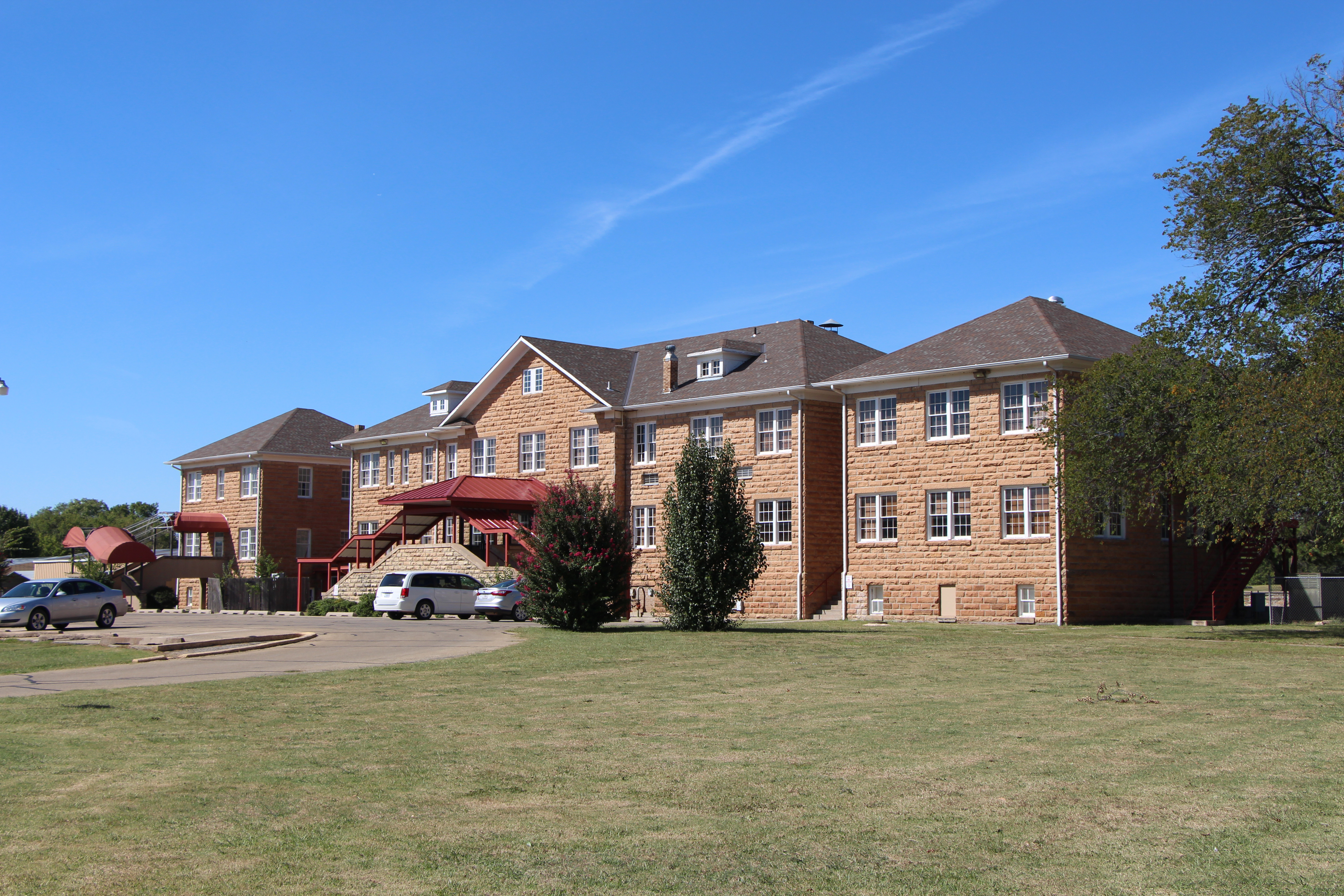
Pawnee Health Clinic, originally Pawnee-Ponca Hospital, built 1929–1931. Photo taken October 10, 2014

Construction of the Pawnee-Ponca Hospital was begun in 1929, and the facility opened January 15, 1931. It had a 55-bed hospital and an attached ward for patients who had tuberculosis. An unattached building west of the main building served as the nurses' residence. The buildings were three stories high, with two and a half stories being above ground. They were faced with quarry-faced, regularly-coursed, ashlar sandstone. The main building has a hipped roof with a centered, south-facing gable. On either side of the gable is a hipped dormer that reappears on other buildings of the district. The nurses' residence and the tubercular ward have pyramidal roofs.

The hospital was originally operated by the United States Public Health Service (USPHS) for the tribes that lived in the surrounding area (primarily Pawnees and Poncas). It was later converted to a health clinic operated by the Indian Health Service (IHS). The former nurses' residence is now the clinic administration building.

=== Home Economics Building ("Old Laundry") ===
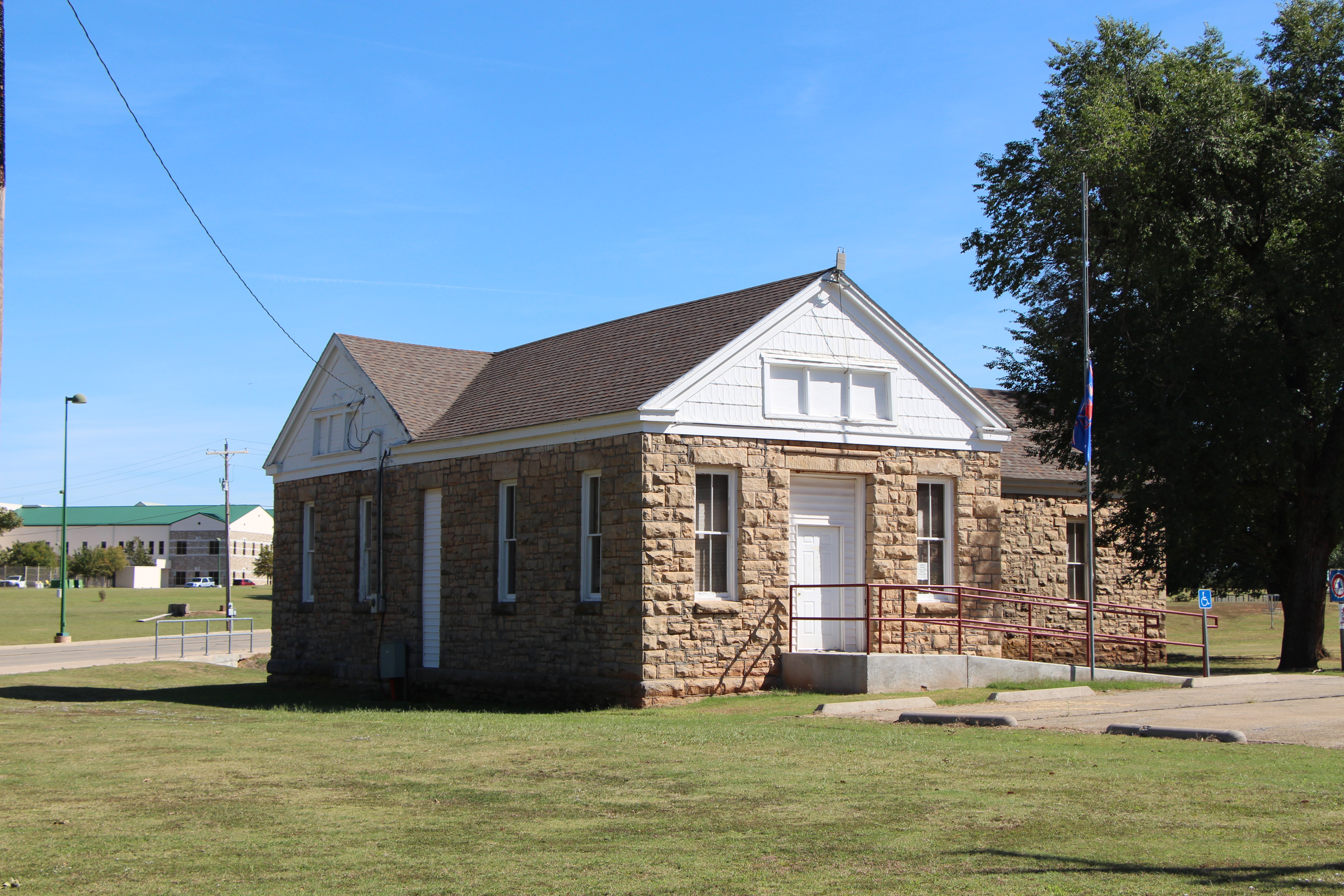
"Old Laundry" later renamed Home Economics Building, now Pawnee Tribal Courthouse.

This building, most recently called the Home Economics Building, was originally built in 1909 as a steam-powered laundry and a carpentry shop. The laundry function moved to another building around 1922, and the space it vacated became a store room. According to the NRHP application, one former student remembered the building housed the home economics program in the late 1920s and early 1930s, but another student recalled it was a dormitory about that time. There is documentary evidence that the agency remodeled the building about 1930 to serve as a dormitory. (Note: According to McClure, a prior report said that remodeling it for use as employee quarters required adding three bathrooms. A map of the facility, prepared in the 1930s, indicated it was employed as quarters for employees of the agency. By 2000, it was being used as the headquarters for Pawnee Nation Law Enforcement and Pawnee Nation District Court.)

The building is one-story high and made of quarry-faced sandstone. Although there have been numerous structural changes during its history, the NRHP application assesses that it still retains its original integrity, including materials and form. McClure noted that it had electric lighting and stoves for heating.

=== 1932 School Building ===
This building was constructed in 1932 to consolidate a number of functions that had previously been scattered in other buildings. It was said to have been completed in September 1933, and contained classrooms, offices, an auditorium and a gymnasium. This was the last building constructed on the school campus, and has several features not found on other buildings, including:

- a T-shaped floor plan, with classrooms and offices in the cross wing and a gymnasium in the column;
- a portico in the center of the cross wing, with three round-arched doorways and, inside the portico, a double-doored entrance framed by a large round-headed arch;
- a date stone above the center of the portico bears the number "1932" and the name "A. R. Snyder", who was the school superintendent at that time;
- decorative arched porticos toward the sides of the front facade, with slightly recessed brick beneath them.

The main part of the building has a flat-top and hipped mansard roof which extends over each end of the front (west) facade, forming a gable over the decorative arch in each end of the facade. Each gable contains a fanlight. There is a flat roof over the portico. The gymnasium has a low-pitch gable roof with no overhang. The roofing material is a light colored metal, and there is a parapet above the ridge. Elsewhere, the roof is covered with modern composition shingles.

This was the main school building until the boarding school ceased to operate in 1958. The Bureau of Indian Affairs (BIA) then turned the building over to the city of Pawnee, which made it available for the Good Samaritans, a charitable service organization to turn it into a nursing home. The Samaritans vacated the building in 1972, when the city announced it would return the school property to the Pawnee tribe. The 1932 School Building was renovated in 1976, then leased by the BIA to become the administrative offices for the Pawnee Agency.

=== Employees' Club ===
The so-called "Employees' Club" was built in 1927 to replace an older wooden building that housed unmarried employees who lived on campus. It now serves only as a storage facility. The new building has two stories and is built of irregularly-coursed, ashlar, quarry-faced stone. It has a gable facing the front and a wood-frame addition on the rear. It also has nearly full-width front porch with a hipped roof, supported by four simple columns. The main building roof is covered with metal shingles. The roof of the wooden addition has composition shingles. Although the building is reportedly in good structural condition, the porch condition is poor, because of rot in the roof and floor.

=== Girls' Dormitory ===
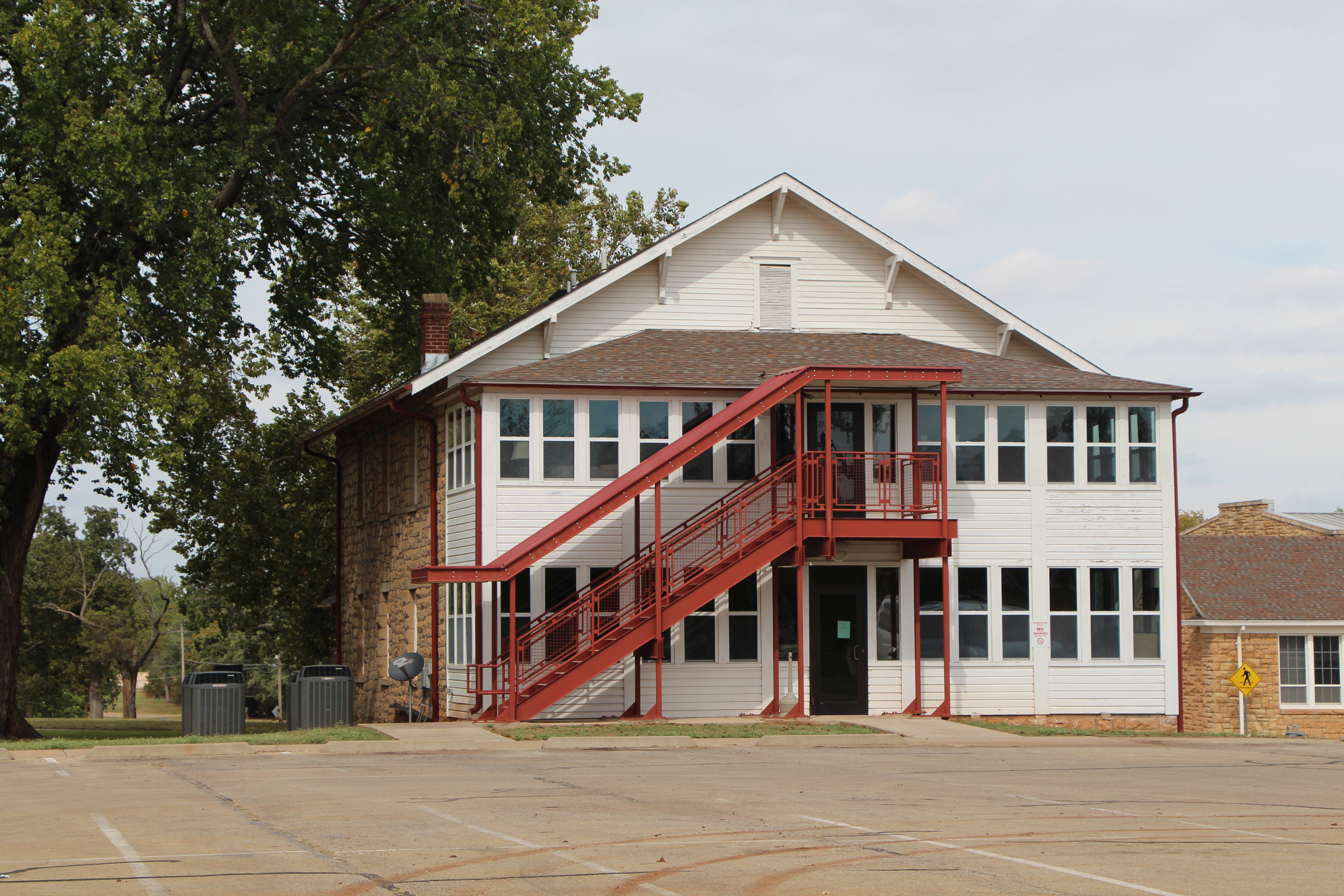
Former Girls' Dormitory. Built 1878. Now Pawnee tribal office building. Photo taken October 13, 2014.

The building now identified as the Girl's Dormitory was originally completed in 1878. The NRHP application indicates that it has had more extensive repair and renovation than any other building in the District. It was the original building of the boarding school, designed to house both boys and girls and to provide both classroom and office space. This original structure was constructed of stone and covered a footprint measuring 31 feet (9.4 m) by 90 feet (27 m). A kitchen extension was added in the same year. A two-story frame extension was added to the front, projecting from the west end of the original facade. By 1890, a 20 foot (6.1 m) by 50 foot (15 m), two-story frame extension was added which projected to the front of the west end of the original facade. This work included adding a veranda that wrapped around the front and east sides of the building. (Note: The veranda also extended across the back of the building, but that portion was removed by 1916.) By 1909, then superintendent, George W. Nellis, decided to replace the frame extension with one of stone. The replacement was completed in 1912.

The original building design resulted in several structural flaws. In 1928, a visiting Superintendent reported that extensive work was required throughout the building to keep the floors from giving way. This problem was alleviated by adding supports for the sagging joints. At the same time, several partitions on the second floor were removed to better use the space and to facilitate evacuation in case of a fire. The building was remodeled in 1954, making unspecified changes. It was renovated again in 1976, before becoming an office building for the Pawnee tribe.

=== Bakery Building ===
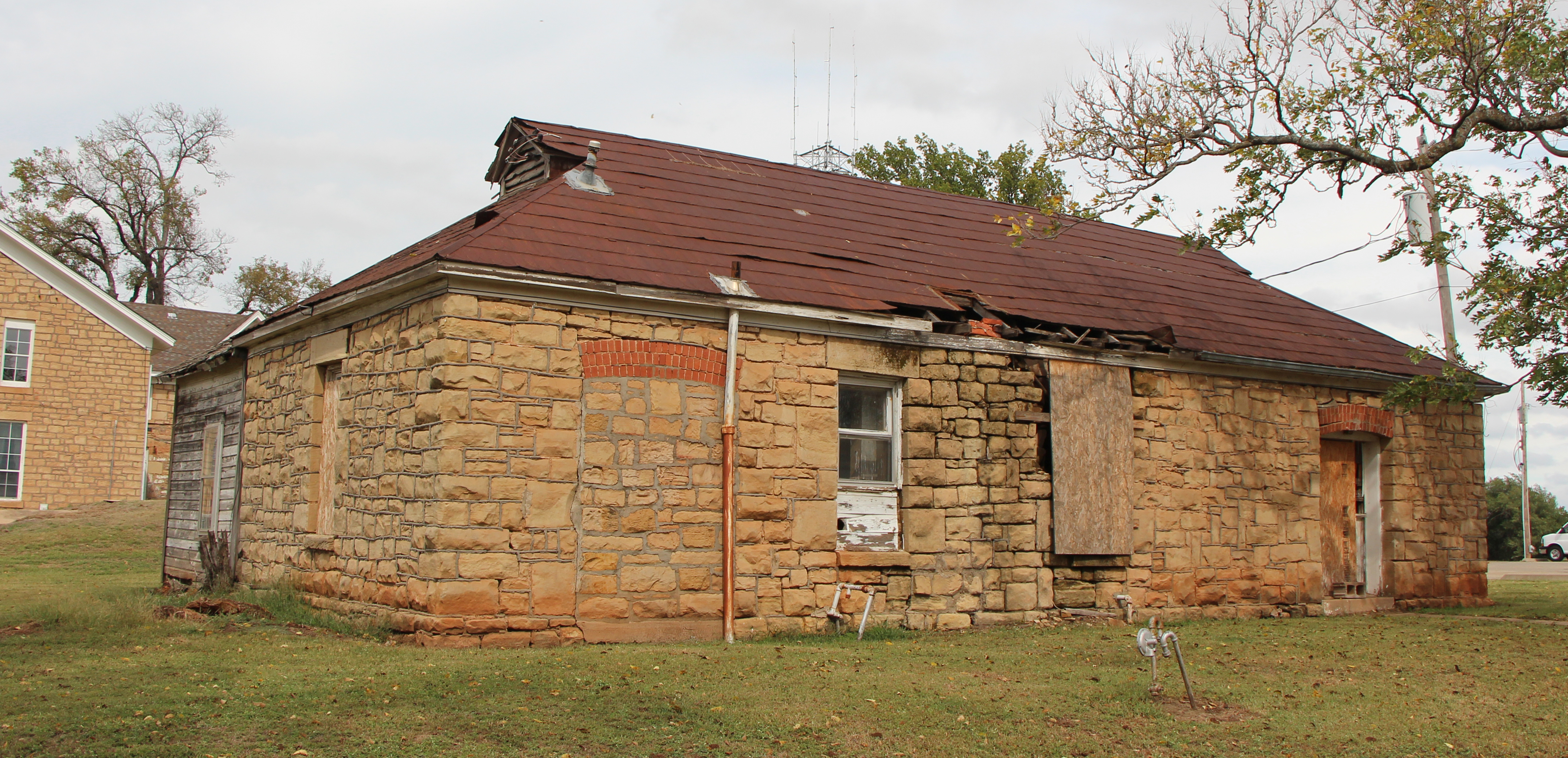
Former Bakery Building (Built 1909). Later became Employees Quarter; vacant by 2000. Photo taken October 13, 2014.

The Bakery Building was a one-story, two-room building constructed in 1909 to perform the function of baking in one room and a second room, called the "milk room" for the handling and storage of meat and dairy products. These functions were relocated to the basement of the 1913 Schoolhouse about 1932. The old Bakery Building was converted to employee quarters by the mid-1930s. It was vacated before the turn of the 21st century. This is a quarry-faced Ashlar stone building that has a hipped roof with gabled dormers at the ends of the roofline. The back of the building has a wood frame extension with a gabled roof, which is covered with gray colored composition shingles. The extension is attached to the northwest corner of the stone structure, causing the floor plan to be L-shaped. The extension has kitchen and bathroom plumbing features that indicate it was probably added when the building was converted to a residence.

=== Employee Quarters and Guest Building ===
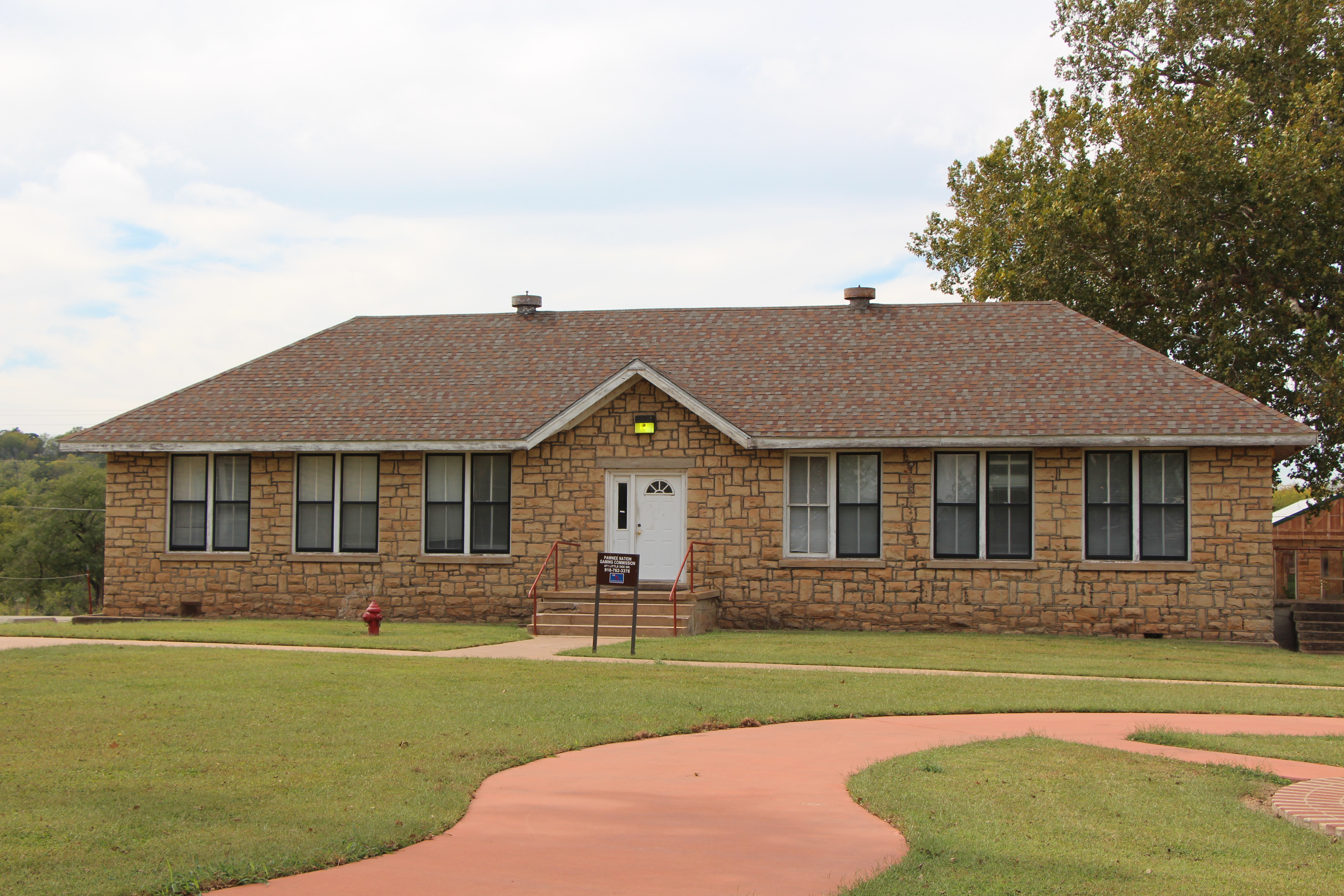
Employee Quarters and Guest Building built in 1927. Now a fitness center.

Built in 1927, the Employee Quarters and Guest Building contained two classrooms and an office for the school's principal. After all classes later moved into the 1932 School Building, this structure was remodeled to serve as employees' apartments. After the school closed, the building was converted to a fitness center for the Pawnee tribe. This is also a rectangular, quarry-faced, Ashlar stone building that has a hipped roof. A gable placed centrally over the front door (east side) breaks up the horizontal roofline. The original door was much larger than the present modern door, and the original door opening has been filled in to suit the change. The building has been assessed as "one of the most (structurally) sound on the campus."

=== Laundry ===
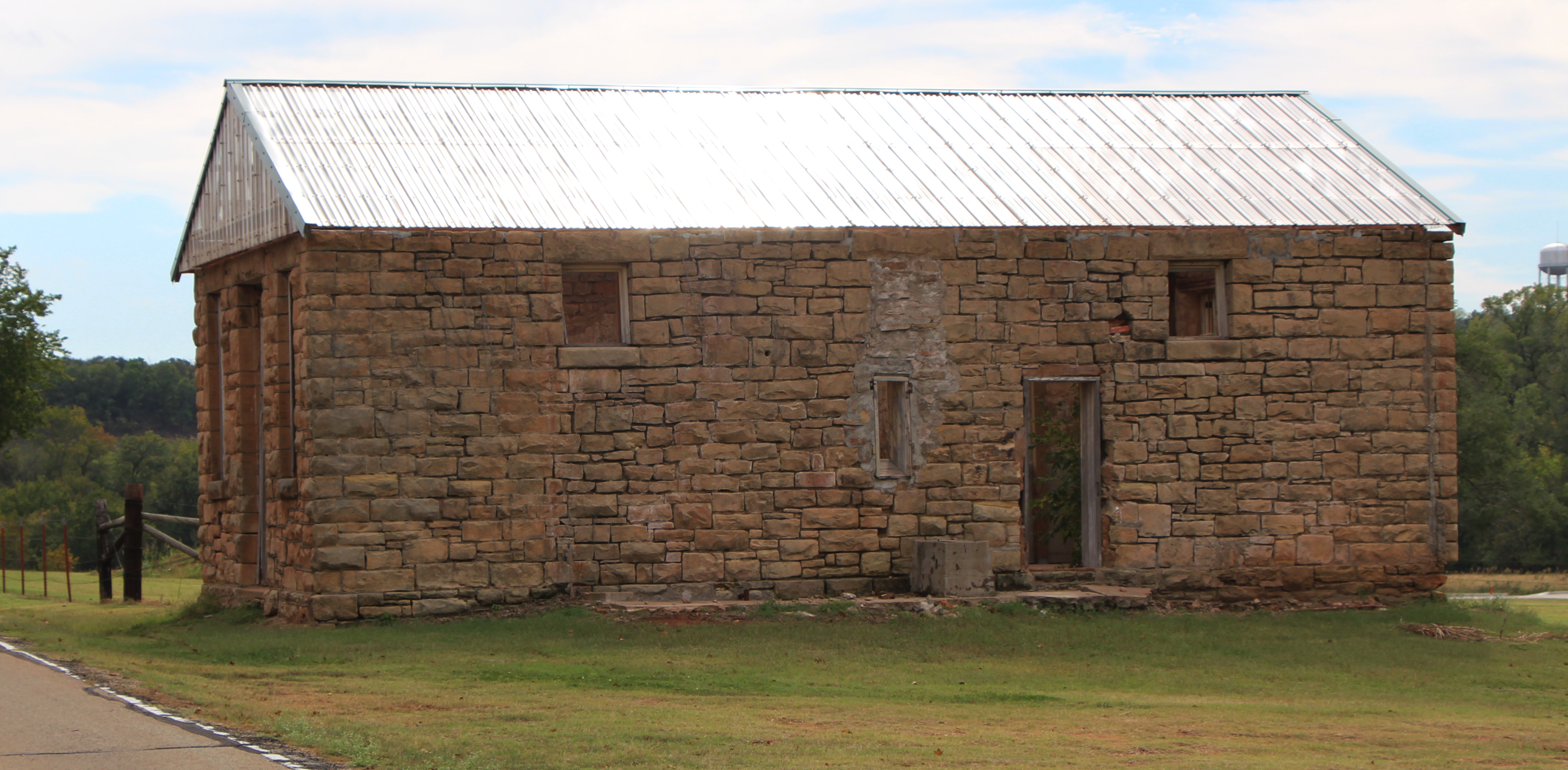
Former storage converted to Laundry. Photo taken October 13, 2014.

This building was originally constructed in 1909 as a storage area. It is flat-roofed, one story high and contains a single room. The 2000 NRHP application states that a 1916 photograph showed a frame lean-to addition, which was removed sometime afterward. The building is constructed of quarry- faced, irregularly-coursed, rubble masonry, and has a gabled roof facing the front. A door centered on the front side is aligned with a door on the back side. The gable ends are shingled, and it has a front-facing louvered vent. The building was converted to serve as the laundry in 1922, but is now unoccupied. The 2000 NRHP application calls its condition,..."the poorest of the buildings of the district." The roof sheathing is partially missing, exposing the rafters to the elements. However, the structure retains its original form, as well as some of the roof sheathing. McClure's thesis stated that the tribe had discussed demolishing the building instead of renovating it.

=== 1913 Schoolhouse ===
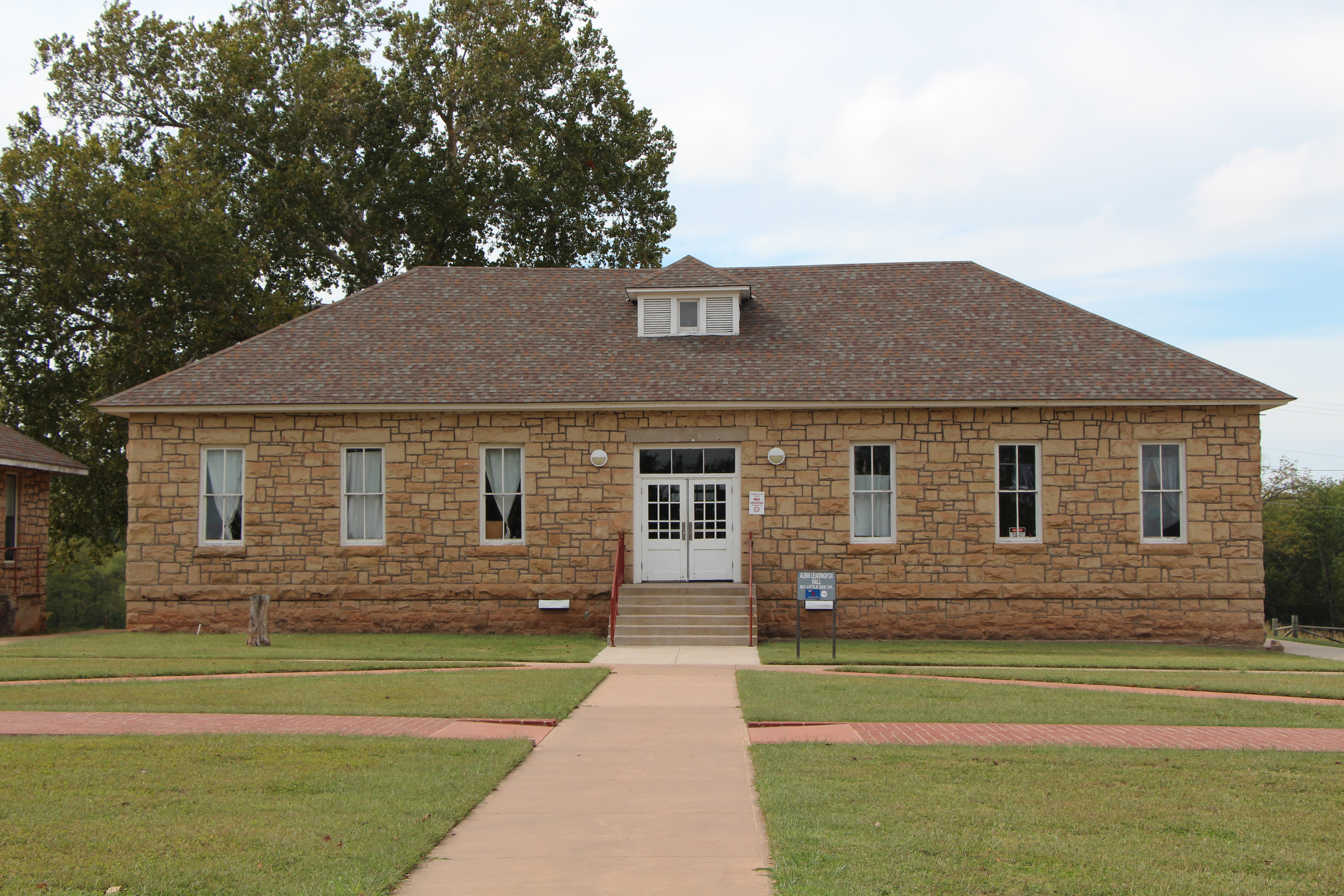
1913 Schoolhouse. Now a dining hall and kitchen used to serve meals to senior citizens. Photo taken October 13, 2014

This two-level building received its name because it was ready to be used just after the start of the academic year in the fall of 1913. The main floor was occupied by two classrooms and an assembly hall. The basement level housed a furnace room, a coal room and a storage room. After classes were relocated to the 1932 School Building, the classrooms in this building were converted to serve as the school dining hall and kitchen. (These functions had previously been housed in the Girls' Dormitory building.) At the same time, the bakery and meat locker were moved into the basement of the 1913 building. There is no indication of whether the furnace and coal storage were left in place after the conversion.

The front facade is a symmetrical rectangle around centered double doors, although the symmetry is masked by a modern shed-like roof over a recently added ramp handicapped access ramp. The T-shaped plan has extensions on each side of the stem at different locations. It is covered with a hipped roof.

According to the District NRHP application, this building, "...is one of the buildings in the best condition on the campus." The building is now used by the Pawnee tribe to serve meals to senior citizens in their community.

=== Boys' Dormitory ===
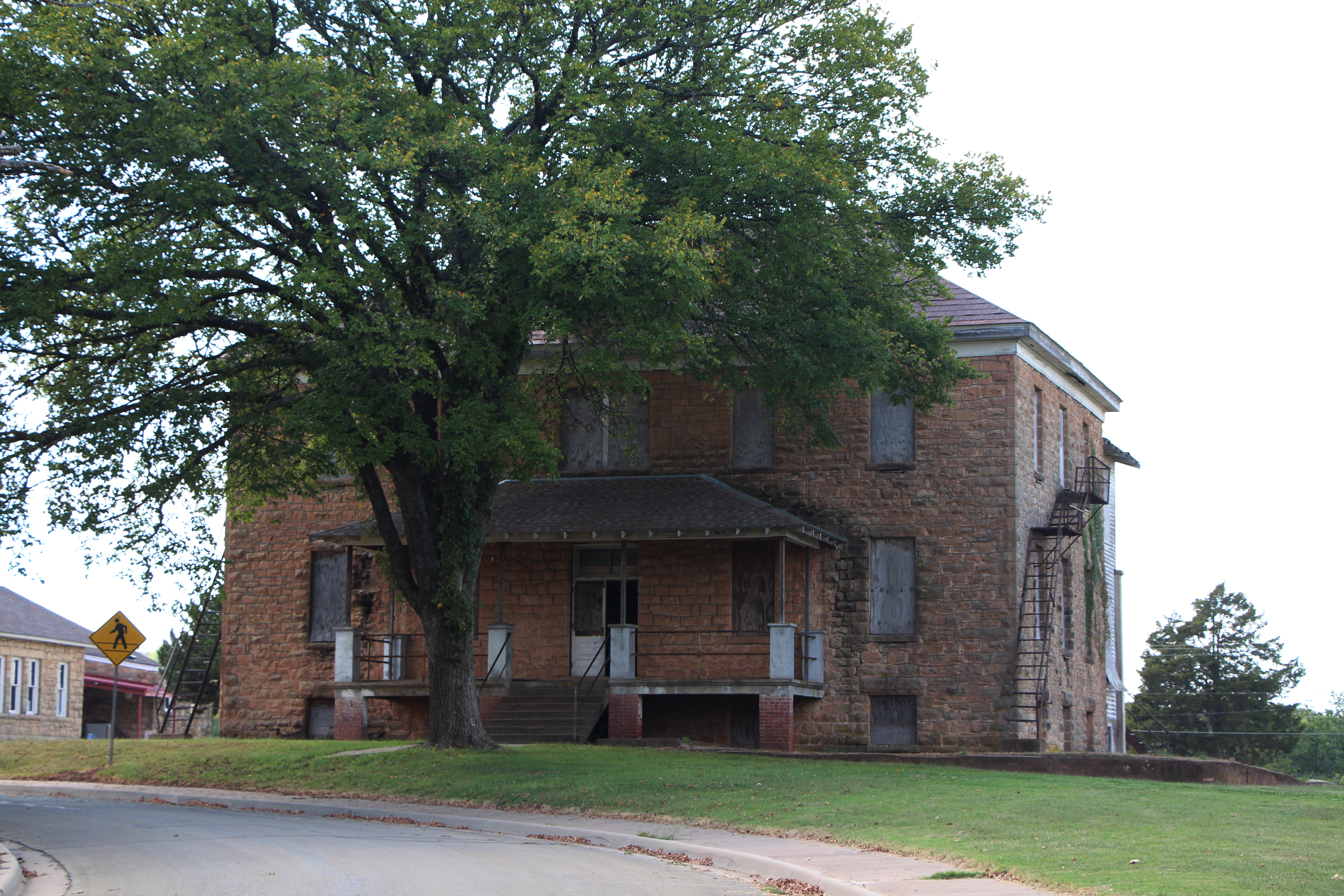
Boys' Dormitory (built 1909) Unoccupied for many years. Photo taken October 13, 2014.

The existing building identified as the Boys' Dormitory was constructed in 1909, replacing an 1892 building destroyed by fire in 1904. This building is rectangular and two-and-a half stories high. The basement contained the furnace, a sitting room, a large closet, a washroom, and a toilet room. the first floor had rooms for matrons and assistants, an office, and a dormitory room. The second floor was primarily dormitory space. The original part of the building has a hipped roof, with a small gabled dormer at each end of the ridgeline. A hipped dormer, likely for ventilation, is centered low on the roof near the front roofline. The roof is now covered with composition shingles. A wood-frame addition, identified as the "sleeping porch," was built on the rear of the original structure to house additional male students. A small stone annex, built in 1929 and connected to the sleeping porch by a frame passageway, housed the bath and washroom facilities (relocated from the basement).

It is unclear when the Boy's Dormitory was permanently closed and the male students moved into the Girls' Dormitory Building. The Boy's Dormitory has remained unoccupied since then. Inspections have revealed serious roof leaks that have caused serious water damage. McGuire added that the building was in poor condition. She cited a report that said, "... the frame addition 'has suffered major water damage ', and '...roof and floor structures are rotted beyond repair.'" Her thesis continued by noting that the damaged addition would have to be removed and totally rebuilt. Also, the bathhouse roof would have to be replaced and the interior completely renovated.

=== Garage (1) ===
Two garage buildings are located west and slightly south of the Principal's Residence. Both were apparently built sometime between 1912 and 1935, but there is no documentation of the date. The westernmost garage (Garage 1) is the smaller of the two. It is rectangular, and has one south-facing garage door opening and a gable roof. The building is in poor condition, since it has settled visibly out-of-square; the bottom of the garage door has been pushed into the interior of the building.

=== Garage (2) ===
The second garage is the larger of the two and is just east of the former. It is also rectangular. Three garage doors are located on the east-facade. The building has a hipped roof with exposed rafter tails. It is also in poor conditions, because some wood siding on the south side is missing and the garage doors will not close completely because the building has settled. The exterior is quarry-faced, irregularly-coursed, ashlar sandstone blocks.

=== 1909 Principal's Residence ===
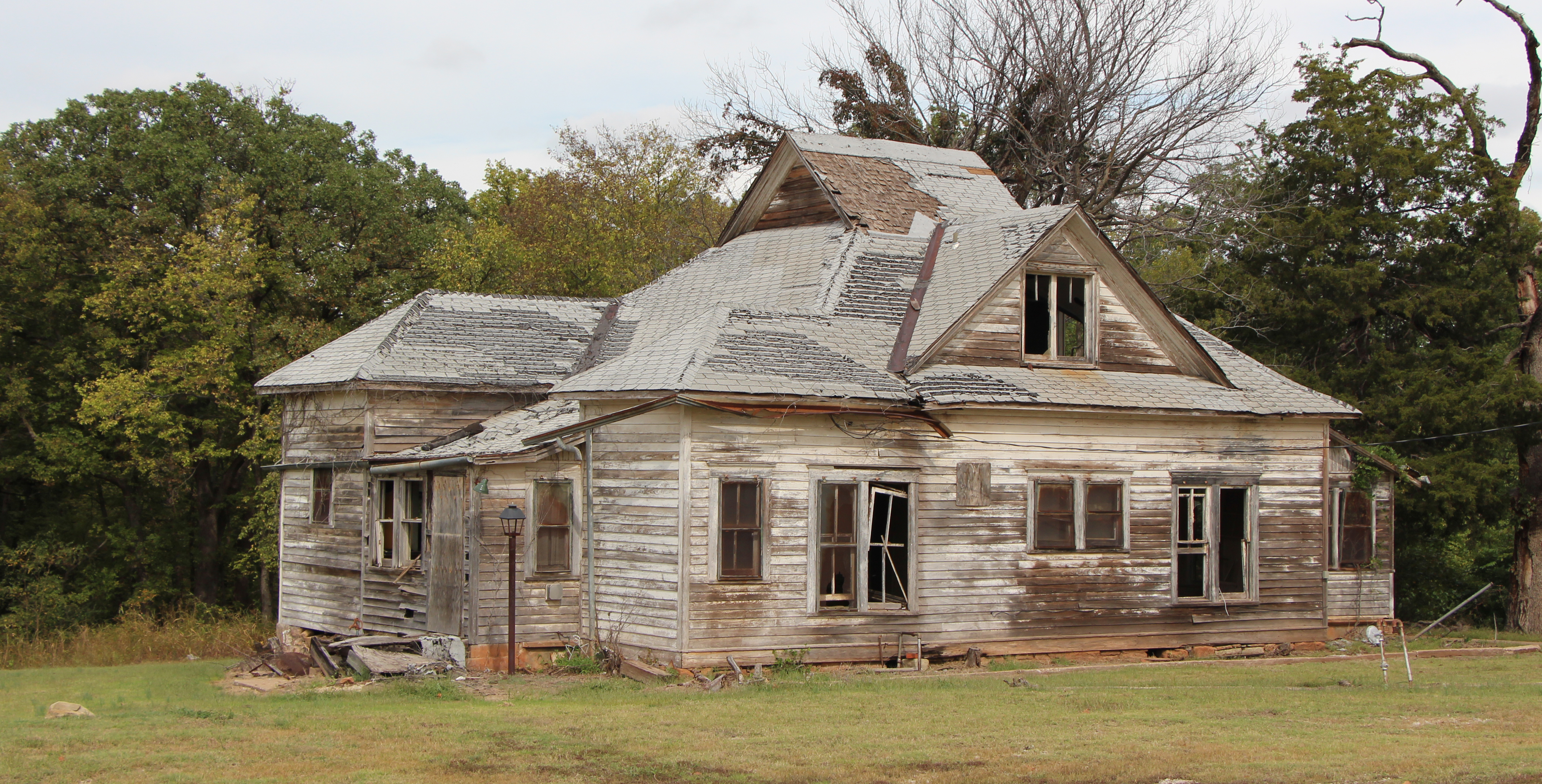
Principal's Residence built in 1893. Used as a private residence after school closed in 1958. Now vacant and in poor condition. Photo taken October 13, 2014.

The Principal's Residence is the only survivor of three school-related residences that were begun in 1893. It was being used as a private residence at the time the NRHP District Application was being prepared. Little information was included about the building.

== Contributing structures ==
=== Culvert ===
According to McClure, the culvert and stone fill under the roadway where Harrison Street becomes Agency Road, over the ravine of an intermittent gully, separate the Hospital and Pawnee Agency Office Building from the Superintendent's Residence. The construction date is unknown.

=== Footbridge ===
A sandstone footbridge carries a sidewalk across the ravine described above. It has a center arch opening and an iron pipe railing. Construction date is unknown.

=== Bridge (concrete) ===
A concrete bridge over a tributary of Black Bear Creek the ravine bridge described above. McClure states that the Oklahoma Stat Preservation Office believes that the bridge was built in the 1930s or 1940s and is a Contributing Resource for the District.

=== Walls (3) ===
Three stone walls have been identified as Contributing Structures. One parallels the west side of Agency Road, just south of the ravine culvert described above. The second runs along the inside of the road north of the Boys' Dormitory. The third runs north and south along the road east of the Emploees' Club Building.

=== Cellar ===
A mostly underground cellar is between the Bakery and Girls' Dormitory buildings. The portion visible above ground is the entrance.

== Non-contributing buildings and structures ==
=== Corrugated metal buildings (2) ===
Two corrugated metal buildings (identified as NC1 and NC2) are west of the nurses' home at the Pawnee-Ponca Hospital building. Both are utilitarian structures of relatively recent construction. The Pawnee tribe uses them as supply and maintenance facilities.

=== Wooden sheds (3) ===
Three wooden sheds (NC3, NC5 and NC6) are located inside the District boundary. NC3 is between the hospital and the nurses' home. NC5 is adjacent to the rear of the School Building. NC6 is behind the Home Economics Building. The sheds are portable storage units with gambrel-shaped roofs.

=== Memorial ===
A memorial to the Pawnee Scouts, erected in 1986, is a three-sided metal pyramid, painted tan, and placed on a two-tiered concrete pad. The bronze plaque on the monument discusses the role of the Pawnee Scouts in the history of the Pawnees and the Indian Wars, and the removal of the tribe to Indian Territory.
