= Jefferson Township, Kansas =

Jefferson Township is the name of 7 townships in the U.S. state of Kansas:

- Jefferson Township, Chautauqua County, Kansas
- Jefferson Township, Dickinson County, Kansas
- Jefferson Township, Geary County, Kansas
- Jefferson Township, Jackson County, Kansas
- Jefferson Township, Jefferson County, Kansas
- Jefferson Township, Rawlins County
- Jefferson Township, Republic County

== See also ==
- Jefferson Township (disambiguation)
