= Cloverdale, Kansas =

Unincorporated community in Chautauqua County, Kansas

Coordinates: 37°13′37″N 96°29′21″W

Cloverdale is an unincorporated community in Chautauqua County, Kansas, United States.

== History ==
A post office was established in Cloverdale in 1871, and remained in operation until it was discontinued in 1905.
