= Grafton, Kansas =

Unincorporated community in Chautauqua County, Kansas

Coordinates: 37°12′01″N 96°08′59″W

Grafton is an unincorporated community in Chautauqua County, Kansas, United States.

== History ==
Grafton had a post office from 1871 until 1906.
