= Lone Chimney Lake =

Lake in Oklahoma, US

- Lower Black Bear Creek Watershed Dam 19M
- Location in Oklahoma
- Location: Pawnee County, Oklahoma (extends into Payne County, Oklahoma)
- Coordinates: 36°14′27″N 96°50′10″W
- Primary inflows: Camp Creek
- Primary outflows: Camp Creek
- Basin countries: United States
- Built: 1980
- Surface area: 550 acres (220 ha)
- Water volume: 5,722 acre⋅ft (7.058 hm^{3})
- Shore length^{1}: 17 mi (27 km)
- Surface elevation: 939 ft (286 m)
- ^{1} Shore length is not a well-defined measure.

Lake Lone Chimney is a lake in Pawnee County, Oklahoma, east of Glencoe. It is owned by the Tri-County Development Authority. The lake, whose dam is also known as Lower Black Bear Creek Watershed Dam 19M, also extends into southern Payne County, Oklahoma. It was built in 1980 by the Tri-County Development Authority, Pawnee County Conservancy District and the Black Bear Conservancy District, assisted by the Oklahoma Conservation Commission and the USDA Natural Resources Conservation Service (NRCS) Watershed Protection and Flood Protection Program.

== Purposes ==
The dam was originally designed as part of a regional flood control project of the Lower Black Bear Creek Watershed, which included nineteen flood control dams. During the period of 1935-1954, before the dams were built, there had been seven major floods and 73 smaller floods. (Note: Major floods were defined as floodwater covering more than 50 percent of the floodplain.)

Before the Lone Chimney Lake was built, the design was altered to include 4,212 acre-feet (5,195,000 m^{3}) of municipal water storage. The lake became the primary source of water for the small communities of Glencoe, Morrison, Yale, Blackburn, Skeede, Maramec and Terlton, Oklahoma. It is a secondary source for the larger towns of Cleveland and Pawnee, Oklahoma.

According to one official website, the lake surface covers an area of 550 acres (2,200,000 m^{2}). It has a shoreline of 17 miles (27 km). The Oklahoma Water Resources Board states that the shoreline is 18 miles (29 km), the normal surface area is 518 acres (2,100,000 m^{2}), water capacity is 5,722 acre-feet (7,058,000 m^{3}), and the normal elevation is 939 feet (286 m) above sea level.

== Impact of drought ==
Lone Chimney Lake has been plagued by drought-related problems for nearly a decade. It was nearly drained of municipal water in 2006, when high consumption caused the fixed intake valve to be above the lake's surface. It had to be replaced with a floating valve. The cost was about $19,000, but allowed the lake management to continue supplying its customers.

The OWRB reported in December, 2011, that Lone Chimney again had to implement forced rationing because the reservoir was critically short of water. In June 2012, the City of Stillwater agreed to sell the Lone Chimney Water Association Up 2,000,000 US gallons (7,600 m^{3}) of treated water per month for 30 years.

In 2012, drought had severely damaged the capability to supply water to about 16,000 customers, because the lake level had dropped 11 feet (3.4 m) below normal. One of the water intakes was above the water level, while the other was partially above the line. By January 14, 2014, a television newscast reported that the lake was within a few weeks of running out of water.

Record rainfall in May and early June, 2015, turned the water situation around at the lake, causing the water level to rise from 14 feet (4.3 m) below normal to 6 feet (1.8 m) below normal. However, the level must rise several more feet before the boat ramps can be used again. The fishing piers are still well above the water level and the land around them has been overgrown with brush that must be cleared. The Lone Chimney water treatment plant, closed several years ago, has not been restarted. That plant used a chloramine treatment process, whereas the Stillwater plant uses a chlorination process. The water treatment board must decide whether to convert the existing plant to achlorination, or to treat Stillwater's product to remove something compatible with the chloramine process.

== See also ==
- Black Bear Creek
