= Chautauqua County, Kansas =

County in the United States

- County
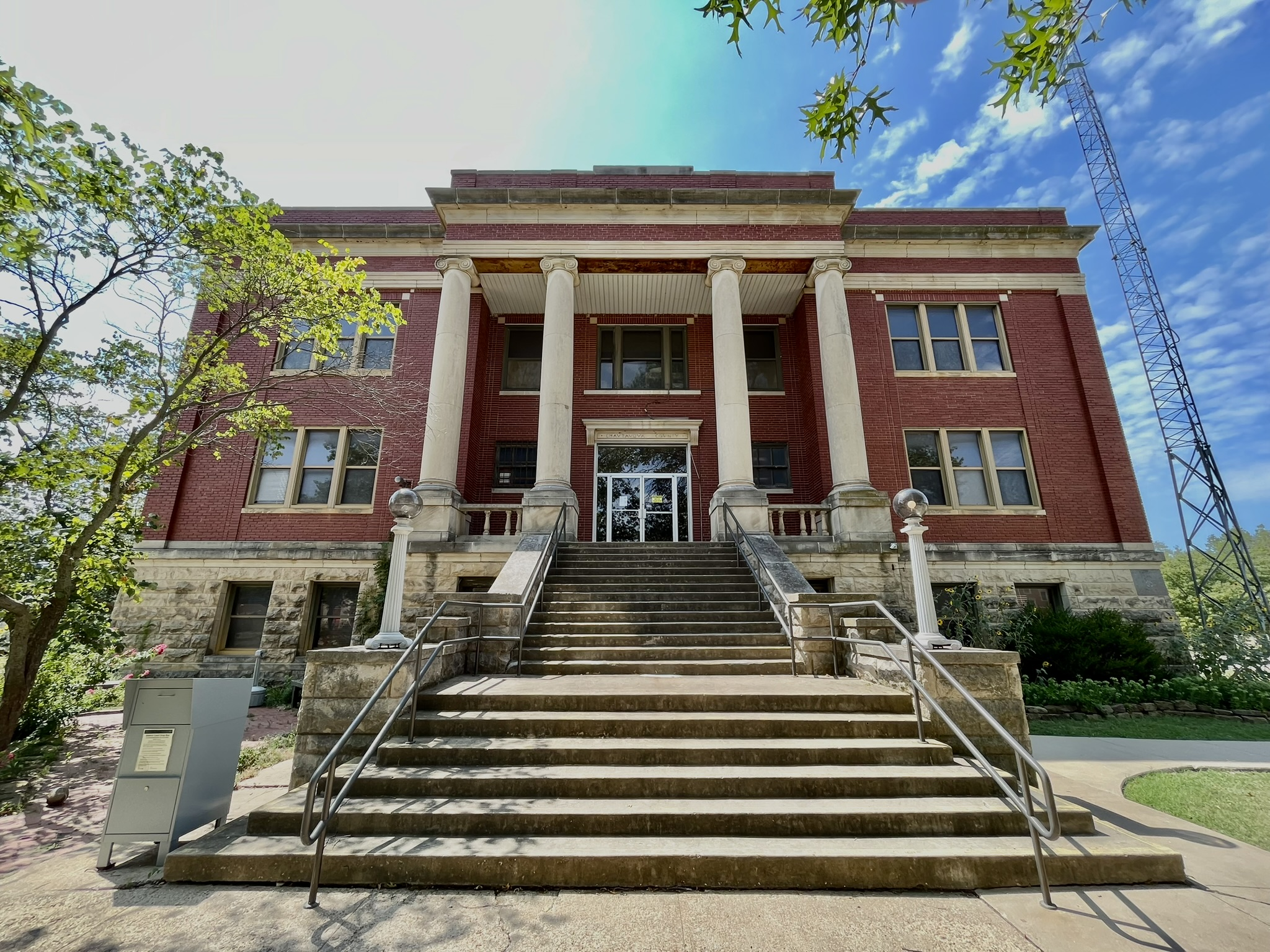
- Chautauqua County Courthouse in Sedan (2023)

- Location within the U.S. state of Kansas
- Coordinates: 37°09′N 96°14′W
- Country: United States
- State: Kansas
- Founded: March 25, 1875
- Named for: Chautauqua County, New York
- Seat: Sedan
- Largest city: Sedan

Area
  - Total: 645 sq mi (1,670 km^{2})
  - Land: 639 sq mi (1,660 km^{2})
  - Water: 5.9 sq mi (15 km^{2}) 0.9%

Population (2020)
  - Total: 3,379
  - Estimate (2025): 3,321 ▼
  - Density: 5.3/sq mi (2.0/km^{2})
- Time zone: UTC−6 (Central)
  - Summer (DST): UTC−5 (CDT)
- Area code: 620
- Congressional district: 4th
- Website: chautauquacountyks.com

Chautauqua County is a county located in Southeast Kansas, United States. Its county seat and most populous city is Sedan. As of the 2020 census, the county population was 3,379. The county is named for Chautauqua County, New York, the birthplace of Edward Jaquins, a Kansas politician who was instrumental in getting the county established.

== History ==
=== Early history ===
For many millennia, the Great Plains of North America was inhabited by nomadic Native Americans. The name is non-native, but is derived from the extinct Native Erie language, spoken near the Great Lakes. From the 16th century to 18th century, the Kingdom of France claimed ownership of large parts of North America. In 1762, after the French and Indian War, France secretly ceded New France to Spain, per the Treaty of Fontainebleau.

=== 19th century ===
In 1802, Spain returned most of the land to France, but keeping title to about 7,500 square miles. In 1803, most of the land for modern day Kansas was acquired by the United States from France as part of the 828,000 square mile Louisiana Purchase for 2.83 cents per acre.

In 1854, the Kansas Territory was organized, then in 1861 Kansas became the 34th U.S. state. Chautauqua County was created by an act of the Kansas legislature on June 1, 1875, by the division of Howard County into Elk County (the northern half) and Chautauqua County (the southern half). At the time of its creation, the county's population was about 7,400.

== Geography ==
According to the U.S. Census Bureau, the county has a total area of 645 square miles (1,670 km^{2}), of which 639 square miles (1,660 km^{2}) is land and 5.9 square miles (15 km^{2}) (0.9%) is water.

=== Adjacent counties ===
- Elk County (north)
- Montgomery County (east)
- Washington County, Oklahoma (southeast)
- Osage County, Oklahoma (south)
- Cowley County (west)

=== Major highways ===
Sources: National Atlas, U.S. Census Bureau

- U.S. Route 166
- Kansas Highway 99

== Demographics ==
Historical population
Census	Pop.	Note	%±
1880	11,072		—
1890	12,297		11.1%
1900	11,804		−4.0%
1910	11,429		−3.2%
1920	11,598		1.5%
1930	10,352		−10.7%
1940	9,233		−10.8%
1950	7,376		−20.1%
1960	5,956		−19.3%
1970	4,642		−22.1%
1980	5,016		8.1%
1990	4,407		−12.1%
2000	4,359		−1.1%
2010	3,669		−15.8%
2020	3,379		−7.9%
2025 (est.)	3,321	▼	−1.7%
U.S. Decennial Census; 1790-1960 1900-1990; 1990-2000 2010-2020

=== Racial and ethnic composition ===
Chautauqua County, Kansas – Racial and ethnic composition Note: the U.S. Census treats Hispanic/Latino as an ethnic category. This table excludes Latinos from the racial categories and assigns them to a separate category. Hispanics/Latinos may be of any race.
Race / Ethnicity (NH = Non-Hispanic)	Pop 1980	Pop 1990	Pop 2000	Pop 2010	Pop 2020	% 1980	% 1990	% 2000	% 2010	% 2020
White alone (NH)	4,848	4,183	4,054	3,291	2,822	96.65%	94.92%	93.00%	89.70%	83.52%
Black or African American alone (NH)	14	23	13	13	23	0.28%	0.52%	0.30%	0.35%	0.68%
Native American or Alaska Native alone (NH)	91	151	154	148	185	1.81%	3.43%	3.53%	4.03%	5.47%
Asian alone (NH)	21	6	3	3	18	0.42%	0.14%	0.07%	0.08%	0.53%
Native Hawaiian or Pacific Islander alone (NH)	x	x	2	1	0	x	x	0.05%	0.03%	0.00%
Other race alone (NH)	1	0	0	0	2	0.02%	0.00%	0.00%	0.00%	0.06%
Mixed race or Multiracial (NH)	x	x	74	126	191	x	x	1.70%	3.43%	5.65%
Hispanic or Latino (any race)	41	44	59	87	138	0.82%	1.00%	1.35%	2.37%	4.08%
Total	5,016	4,407	4,359	3,669	3,379	100.00%	100.00%	100.00%	100.00%	100.00%

=== 2020 census ===
As of the 2020 census, the county had a population of 3,379. The median age was 45.9 years, with 21.8% of residents under the age of 18 and 25.2% aged 65 years or older. For every 100 females there were 109.4 males, and for every 100 females age 18 and over there were 107.0 males. 0.0% of residents lived in urban areas, while 100.0% lived in rural areas.

The racial makeup of the county was 84.3% White, 0.7% Black or African American, 5.6% American Indian and Alaska Native, 0.6% Asian, 0.0% Native Hawaiian and Pacific Islander, 2.2% from some other race, and 6.7% from two or more races. Hispanic or Latino residents of any race comprised 4.1% of the population.

There were 1,401 households in the county, of which 26.8% had children under the age of 18 living with them and 22.6% had a female householder with no spouse or partner present. About 31.4% of all households were made up of individuals and 15.5% had someone living alone who was 65 years of age or older.

There were 1,976 housing units, of which 29.1% were vacant. Among occupied housing units, 78.9% were owner-occupied and 21.1% were renter-occupied. The homeowner vacancy rate was 4.4% and the rental vacancy rate was 12.7%.

=== 2000 census ===
As of the 2000 census, there were 4,359 people, 1,796 households, and 1,235 families residing in the county. The population density was 7 people per square mile (2.7 people/km^{2}). There were 2,169 housing units at an average density of 3 per square mile (1.2/km^{2}). The racial makeup of the county was 93.83% White, 0.30% Black or African American, 3.58% Native American, 0.07% Asian, 0.05% Pacific Islander, 0.34% from other races, and 1.84% from two or more races. Hispanic or Latino of any race were 1.35% of the population.

There were 1,796 households, out of which 26.20% had children under the age of 18 living with them, 57.30% were married couples living together, 7.90% had a female householder with no husband present, and 31.20% were non-families. 29.40% of all households were made up of individuals, and 16.40% had someone living alone who was 65 years of age or older. The average household size was 2.34 and the average family size was 2.87.

In the county, the population was spread out, with 23.40% under the age of 18, 6.10% from 18 to 24, 20.90% from 25 to 44, 25.20% from 45 to 64, and 24.30% who were 65 years of age or older. The median age was 45 years. For every 100 females there were 93.60 males. For every 100 females age 18 and over, there were 91.20 males.

The median income for a household in the county was $28,717, and the median income for a family was $33,871. Males had a median income of $25,083 versus $21,346 for females. The per capita income for the county was $16,280. About 9.00% of families and 12.20% of the population were below the poverty line, including 15.80% of those under age 18 and 10.60% of those age 65 or over.

== Government ==
=== Presidential elections ===
Presidential election results

United States presidential election results for Chautauqua County, Kansas
Year	Republican		Democratic		Third party(ies)	
Year	No.	%	No.	%	No.	%
1888	1,590	57.57%	694	25.13%	478	17.31%
1892	1,408	52.03%	0	0.00%	1,298	47.97%
1896	1,359	50.92%	1,293	48.45%	17	0.64%
1900	1,618	55.47%	1,280	43.88%	19	0.65%
1904	2,033	67.47%	681	22.60%	299	9.92%
1908	1,689	60.19%	958	34.14%	159	5.67%
1912	818	31.35%	752	28.82%	1,039	39.82%
1916	2,085	49.69%	1,737	41.40%	374	8.91%
1920	2,539	68.58%	936	25.28%	227	6.13%
1924	2,439	59.99%	1,087	26.73%	540	13.28%
1928	3,303	75.97%	944	21.71%	101	2.32%
1932	1,893	43.42%	2,263	51.90%	204	4.68%
1936	2,506	54.49%	2,080	45.23%	13	0.28%
1940	2,888	62.70%	1,679	36.45%	39	0.85%
1944	2,305	67.38%	1,106	32.33%	10	0.29%
1948	1,925	59.34%	1,261	38.87%	58	1.79%
1952	2,542	74.76%	837	24.62%	21	0.62%
1956	2,180	70.85%	887	28.83%	10	0.32%
1960	2,160	70.54%	885	28.90%	17	0.56%
1964	1,463	55.42%	1,163	44.05%	14	0.53%
1968	1,537	65.52%	478	20.38%	331	14.11%
1972	1,546	78.00%	378	19.07%	58	2.93%
1976	1,159	55.77%	866	41.67%	53	2.55%
1980	1,566	71.60%	543	24.83%	78	3.57%
1984	1,688	76.55%	497	22.54%	20	0.91%
1988	1,247	64.48%	661	34.18%	26	1.34%
1992	853	41.15%	598	28.85%	622	30.00%
1996	1,142	58.27%	568	28.98%	250	12.76%
2000	1,347	71.65%	443	23.56%	90	4.79%
2004	1,529	78.01%	404	20.61%	27	1.38%
2008	1,418	76.57%	401	21.65%	33	1.78%
2012	1,304	80.00%	280	17.18%	46	2.82%
2016	1,236	83.46%	197	13.30%	48	3.24%
2020	1,402	85.28%	212	12.90%	30	1.82%
2024	1,299	85.07%	211	13.82%	17	1.11%

Chautauqua is an overwhelmingly Republican county. The only Republican to ever lose the county is Herbert Hoover during his landslide 1932 election defeat when he carried fewer than fifty counties west of the Mississippi. Apart from never-Democratic, historically Yankee Doniphan County, it was the only Kansas county to give incumbent President William Howard Taft a plurality in 1912. The last Democrat to pass thirty percent of the county's vote was Michael Dukakis in 1988, and in 2020 Joe Biden received less than thirteen percent.

=== Laws ===
Although the Kansas Constitution was amended in 1986 to allow the sale of alcoholic liquor by the individual drink with the approval of voters, Chautauqua County remained a prohibition, or "dry", county, until 2008, when a county wide ballot measure was approved to allow individual liquor sales with a 30 percent food requirement.

== Education ==
=== Unified school districts ===
- Cedar Vale USD 285
- Chautauqua County USD 286

== Communities ==
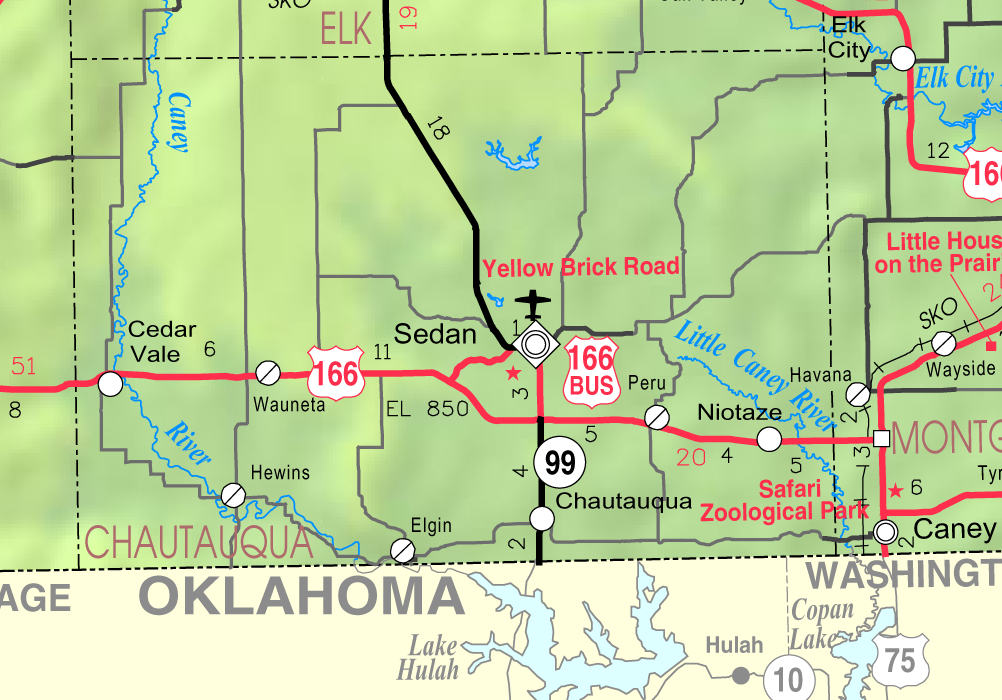
2005 map of Chautauqua County (map legend)

List of townships / incorporated cities / unincorporated communities / extinct former communities within Chautauqua County.

=== Cities ===
- Cedar Vale
- Chautauqua
- Elgin
- Niotaze
- Peru
- Sedan (county seat)

=== Unincorporated communities ===
- Cloverdale
- Grafton
- Hale
- Hewins
- Jonesburg (originally spelled Jonesburgh)
- Lowe (Gibbs)
- Monett
- Rogers
- Wauneta

=== Ghost towns ===
- Boston
- Layton
- Leeds
- Matanzas
- Moore
- Osro

=== Townships ===
Chautauqua County is divided into twelve townships. None of the cities within the county are considered governmentally independent, and all figures for the townships include those of the cities. In the following table, the population center is the largest city (or cities) included in that township's population total, if it is of a significant size.

Township	FIPS	Population center	Population	Population density /km^{2} (/sq mi)	Land area km^{2} (sq mi)	Water area km^{2} (sq mi)	Water %	Geographic coordinates
Belleville	05575		675	4 (11)	155 (60)	0 (0)	0.14%	37°3′50″N 96°7′48″W
Caneyville	10425		88	1 (2)	144 (55)	1 (0)	0.38%	37°15′23″N 96°27′27″W
Center	11575		75	1 (1)	144 (56)	1 (0)	0.80%	37°15′28″N 96°18′31″W
Harrison	30275		114	1 (2)	142 (55)	0 (0)	0.14%	37°4′3″N 96°26′32″W
Hendricks	31300		179	1 (3)	142 (55)	0 (0)	0.05%	37°1′12″N 96°18′42″W
Jefferson	35125	Cedar Vale	834	6 (15)	144 (56)	1 (0)	0.45%	37°6′45″N 96°29′12″W
Lafayette	37650		65	0 (1)	154 (59)	2 (1)	1.40%	37°15′36″N 96°10′20″W
Little Caney	41525		353	3 (8)	117 (45)	0 (0)	0.31%	37°3′51″N 96°1′5″W
Salt Creek	62775		123	1 (3)	127 (49)	0 (0)	0.34%	37°15′13″N 96°1′34″W
Sedan	63775	Sedan	1,660	13 (34)	128 (49)	1 (0)	0.65%	37°7′50″N 96°11′6″W
Summit	69025		106	1 (2)	144 (56)	1 (0)	0.40%	37°8′17″N 96°19′53″W
Washington	75550		87	1 (2)	121 (47)	1 (0)	0.71%	37°7′41″N 96°0′52″W
Sources: "Census 2000 U.S. Gazetteer Files". U.S. Census Bureau, Geography Division. Archived from the original on August 2, 2002.

== See also ==
Community information for Kansas

- Kansas locations by per capita income
- List of counties in Kansas
- List of townships in Kansas
- List of cities in Kansas
- List of unincorporated communities in Kansas
- List of ghost towns in Kansas
