= Belleville Township =

Belleville Township may refer to:

- Belleville Township, St. Clair County, Illinois, coextensive with the city of Belleville
- Belleville Township, Chautauqua County, Kansas
- Belleville Township, Republic County, Kansas
- Belleville Township, Essex County, New Jersey
