= Harrison Township, Chautauqua County, Kansas =

Harrison Township
- Township
- Location in Chautauqua County
- Coordinates: 37°03′00″N 096°27′05″W
- Country: United States
- State: Kansas
- County: Chautauqua

Area
  - Total: 55.07 sq mi (142.64 km^{2})
  - Land: 55.00 sq mi (142.44 km^{2})
  - Water: 0.073 sq mi (0.19 km^{2}) 0.13%
- Elevation: 890 ft (270 m)

Population (2020)
  - Total: 70
  - Density: 1.3/sq mi (0.5/km^{2})
- GNIS feature ID: 0469108

Harrison Township is a township in Chautauqua County, Kansas, United States. As of the 2020 census, its population was 70.

== Geography ==
Harrison Township covers an area of 55.07 square miles (142.6 km^{2}) and contains no incorporated settlements. According to the USGS, it contains two cemeteries: Osro Falls and Rose Dale.

The streams of Cedar Creek, Dry Creek, Possum Trot Creek, Rock Creek and Spring Branch run through this township.
