= Hale, Kansas =

Unincorporated community in Chautauqua County, Kansas

Coordinates: 37°14′05″N 96°03′18″W

Hale is an unincorporated community in Salt Creek Township, Chautauqua County, Kansas, United States.

== History ==
A post office was opened in Hale in 1882, and remained in operation until it was discontinued in 1907.
