= Rogers, Kansas =

Unincorporated community in Chautauqua County, Kansas

Coordinates: 37°08′49″N 96°16′45″W

Rogers is an unincorporated community in Chautauqua County, Kansas, United States.

== History ==
A post office was opened in Rogers in 1887, and remained in operation until it was discontinued in 1905.
