= Caney River =

River in the United States

Caney River Little Verdigris, Cana, Connie
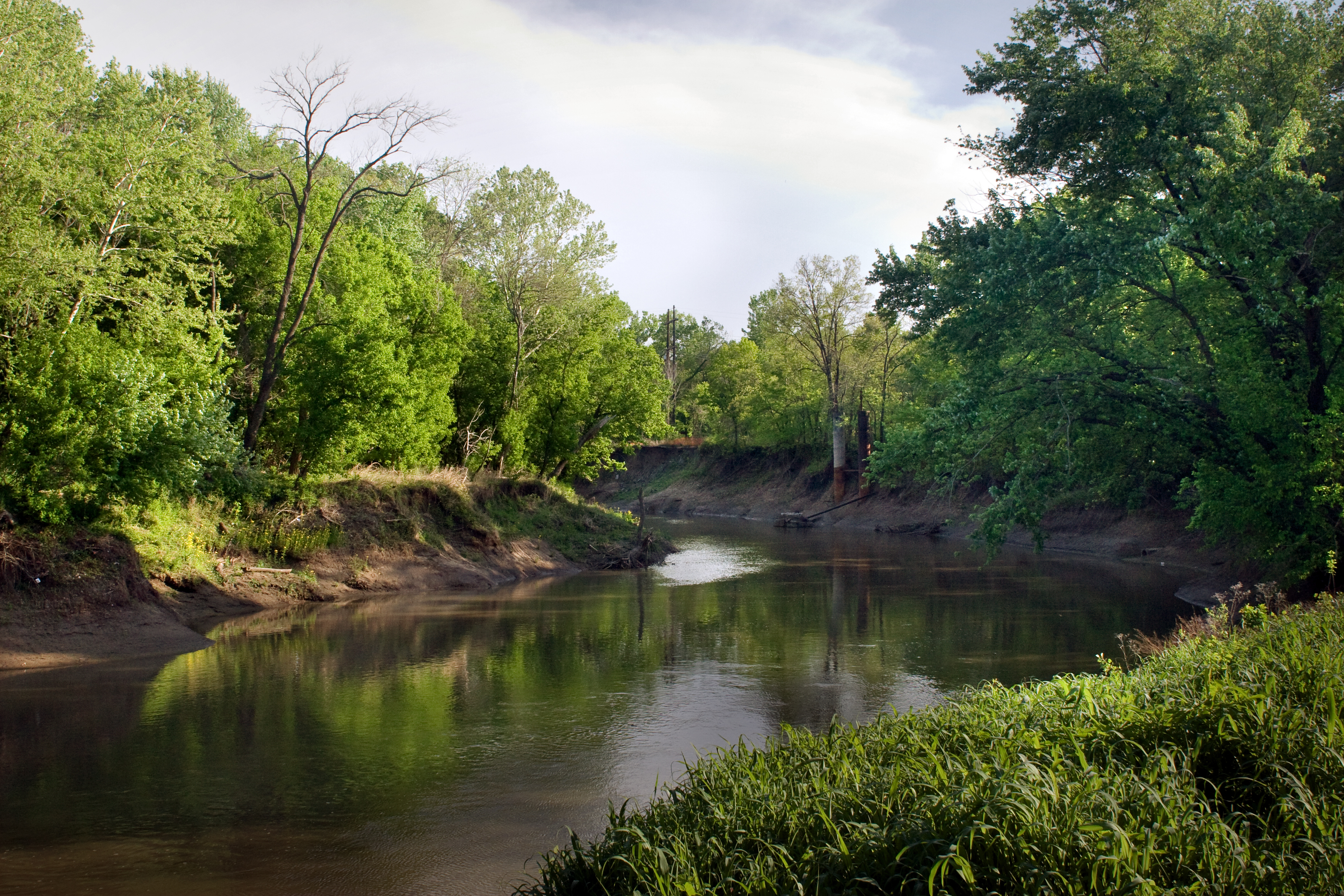
- Native name: Kènii Sipu (Unami)

Location
- Country: United States
- State: Kansas, Oklahoma
- City: Bartlesville, OK

Physical characteristics
- Source
  - location: Elk County, Kansas, United States
  - coordinates: 37°29′14″N 096°28′34″W
  - elevation: 1,145 ft (349 m)
- Mouth: Verdigris River
  - location: Near Verdigris, Oklahoma, United States
  - coordinates: 36°20′16″N 095°41′57″W
  - elevation: 167 ft (51 m)
- Length: 180 mi (290 km), South
- Discharge
  - location: Ramona
  - average: 1,701 cu ft/s (48.2 m^{3}/s)

Basin features
- River system: Verdigris River

The Caney River (Lenape: Kènii Sipu) is a 180-mile-long (290 km) river in southern Kansas and northeastern Oklahoma. The river is a tributary of the Verdigris River, and is usually a flatwater stream.

The Caney forms just north of the town of Grenola in Elk County, Kansas, then moves south into Oklahoma near Elgin, Kansas. It then flows south through Osage County, where it is dammed near Bowring to form Hulah Lake. Downstream of the Hulah dam, the river flows into Washington County through the center of Bartlesville, where it separates the city's downtown from its residential east side. Just south of Bartlesville, the river turns southeast and flows into Rogers County, where it joins the Verdigris River between Collinsville and Claremore.

The river is normally flat water, except when there are heavy rainstorms within the drainage area. It is popular for canoeing, both above and below Hulah Lake. However, there are almost no facilities for boaters between Wah-Sha-She State Park (near Hulah Dam) and the confluence with the Verdigris River. The river does feature Osro Falls, an old covered wagon crossing point near Hewins, Kansas. The waterfall only measures about 3 feet in height, but extends nearly 200 feet across the river.

The river caused disastrous floods in the Bartlesville area in 1885, 1926 and 1986.

The dam at Hulah Lake is operated by the United States Army Corps of Engineers. In October 1986 the Corps was forced to open floodgates at the dam due to above-average rainfall in the Great Plains. The resulting 500-year flood split Bartlesville virtually in half for several days and caused more than US$30 million in property damage.

== See also ==
- Caney, Kansas
- List of Kansas rivers
- List of Oklahoma rivers
