= Caneyville Township, Kansas =

Caneyville Township
- Township
- Location in Chautauqua County
- Coordinates: 37°15′10″N 096°27′21″W
- Country: United States
- State: Kansas
- County: Chautauqua

Area
  - Total: 55.70 sq mi (144.27 km^{2})
  - Land: 55.49 sq mi (143.72 km^{2})
  - Water: 0.21 sq mi (0.55 km^{2}) 0.38%
- Elevation: 1,037 ft (316 m)

Population (2020)
  - Total: 89
  - Density: 1.6/sq mi (0.6/km^{2})
- GNIS feature ID: 0485518

Caneyville Township is a township in Chautauqua County, Kansas, United States. As of the 2020 census, its population was 89.

== Geography ==
Caneyville Township covers an area of 55.7 square miles (144 km^{2}) and contains no incorporated settlements. According to the USGS, it contains three cemeteries: New Cloverdale, Old Cloverdale and Pleasant Valley.

The streams of Squaw Creek and Wolf Creek run through this township.
