= Osro, Kansas =

Ghost town in Chautauqua County, Kansas

- Ghost town
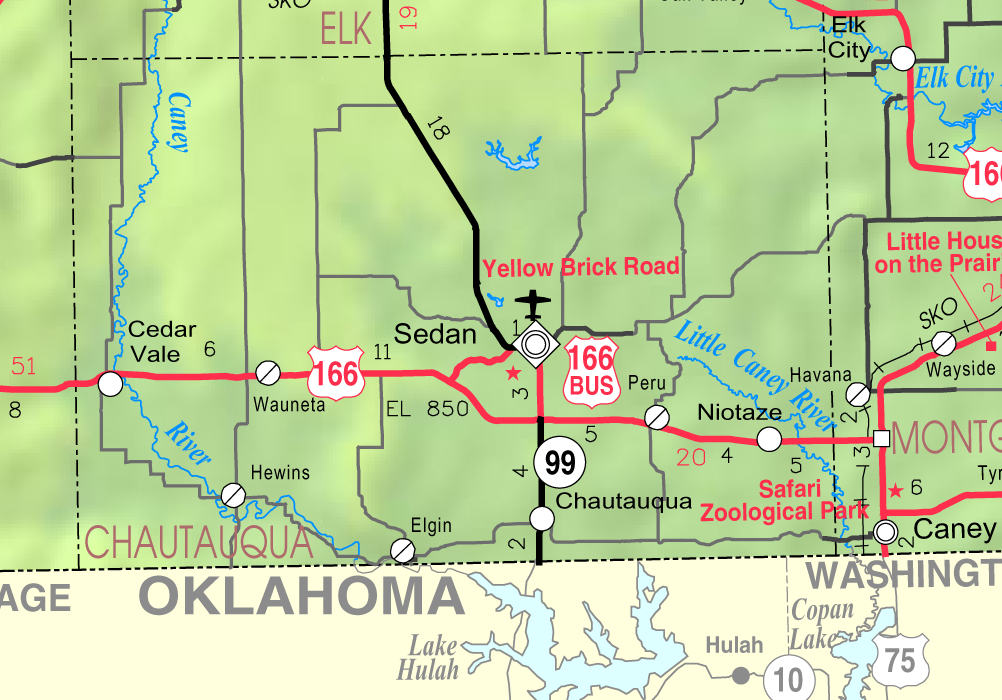
- KDOT map of Chautauqua County (legend)

- Location within Kansas Location within the United States
- Coordinates: 37°03′57″N 96°26′10″W
- Country: United States
- State: Kansas
- County: Chautauqua
- Elevation: 876 ft (267 m)

Population
  - Total: 0
- Time zone: UTC-6 (CST)
  - Summer (DST): UTC-5 (CDT)
- Area code: 620
- FIPS code: 20-53415
- GNIS ID: 484428

Osro is a ghost town in Chautauqua County, Kansas, United States.

== History ==
A post office in Chautauqua County called Ozro operated from 1888 to 1892.

Osro's location is within a mile of Osro Falls, also known as Ozro Falls, an old covered wagon crossing point on the Caney River. The waterfall only measures about 3 feet in height, but extends nearly 200 feet across the river.
