= Jefferson Township, Chautauqua County, Kansas =

Jefferson Township
- Township
- Location in Chautauqua County
- Coordinates: 37°09′20″N 096°26′53″W
- Country: United States
- State: Kansas
- County: Chautauqua

Area
  - Total: 55.82 sq mi (144.58 km^{2})
  - Land: 55.57 sq mi (143.92 km^{2})
  - Water: 0.25 sq mi (0.66 km^{2}) 0.46%
- Elevation: 1,120 ft (340 m)

Population (2020)
  - Total: 568
  - Density: 10/sq mi (3.9/km^{2})
- GNIS feature ID: 0469109

Jefferson Township is a township in Chautauqua County, Kansas, United States. As of the 2020 census, its population was 568.

== Geography ==
Jefferson Township covers an area of 55.82 square miles (144.6 km^{2}) and contains one incorporated settlement, Cedar Vale. According to the USGS, it contains three cemeteries: Cedar Vale, Grant Creek and Round Mound.

The streams of Otter Creek, Shanghai Creek, Turkey Creek and Union Creek run through this township.

== Transportation ==
Jefferson Township contains one airport or landing strip, Mills Ranch Airport.
