= Summit Township, Chautauqua County, Kansas =

Summit Township
- Township
- Location in Chautauqua County
- Coordinates: 37°07′00″N 096°18′15″W
- Country: United States
- State: Kansas
- County: Chautauqua

Area
  - Total: 55.92 sq mi (144.83 km^{2})
  - Land: 55.70 sq mi (144.25 km^{2})
  - Water: 0.22 sq mi (0.58 km^{2}) 0.4%
- Elevation: 1,056 ft (322 m)

Population (2020)
  - Total: 92
  - Density: 1.6/sq mi (0.6/km^{2})
- GNIS feature ID: 0469130

Summit Township is a township in Chautauqua County, Kansas, United States. As of the 2020 census, its population was 92.

== Geography ==
Summit Township covers an area of 55.92 square miles (144.8 km^{2}) and contains no incorporated settlements. According to the USGS, it contains three cemeteries: Denick, Rogers and Spring Creek.

The streams of Pool Creek, Possum Creek, Rock Creek and Spring Creek run through this township.
