= Little Caney Township, Kansas =

Little Caney Township
- Township
- Location in Chautauqua County
- Coordinates: 37°03′05″N 096°02′24″W
- Country: United States
- State: Kansas
- County: Chautauqua

Area
  - Total: 45.27 sq mi (117.26 km^{2})
  - Land: 45.1 sq mi (116.9 km^{2})
  - Water: 0.14 sq mi (0.37 km^{2}) 0.32%
- Elevation: 892 ft (272 m)

Population (2020)
  - Total: 330
  - Density: 7.3/sq mi (2.8/km^{2})
- GNIS feature ID: 0469137

Little Caney Township is a township in Chautauqua County, Kansas, United States. As of the 2020 census, its population was 330.

== Geography ==
Little Caney Township covers an area of 45.28 square miles (117.3 km^{2}) and contains one incorporated settlement, Niotaze. According to the USGS, it contains five cemeteries: Elcado, Fairview, Haynes, Ireland and Mooney.

Niotaze Lake is within this township. The streams of Birch Creek, Lake Creek and Little Caney River run through this township.
