= Sedan Township, Kansas =

Sedan Township
- Township
- Location in Chautauqua County
- Coordinates: 37°09′04″N 096°10′20″W
- Country: United States
- State: Kansas
- County: Chautauqua

Area
  - Total: 49.81 sq mi (129.02 km^{2})
  - Land: 49.49 sq mi (128.18 km^{2})
  - Water: 0.32 sq mi (0.84 km^{2}) 0.65%
- Elevation: 909 ft (277 m)

Population (2020)
  - Total: 1,367
  - Density: 27/sq mi (10.6/km^{2})
- GNIS feature ID: 0469154

Sedan Township is a township in Chautauqua County, Kansas, United States. As of the 2020 census, its population was 1,367.

== Geography ==
Sedan Township covers an area of 49.82 square miles (129.0 km^{2}) and contains one incorporated settlement, Sedan (the county seat). The streams of Deer Creek, Fly Creek and Wolf Creek run through this township. According to the United States Geological Survey, it contains two cemeteries: Casement and Greenwood.

== Transportation ==
Sedan Township contains one airport, Sedan City Airport.
