= Hewins, Kansas =

Unincorporated community in Chautauqua County, Kansas

- Unincorporated community
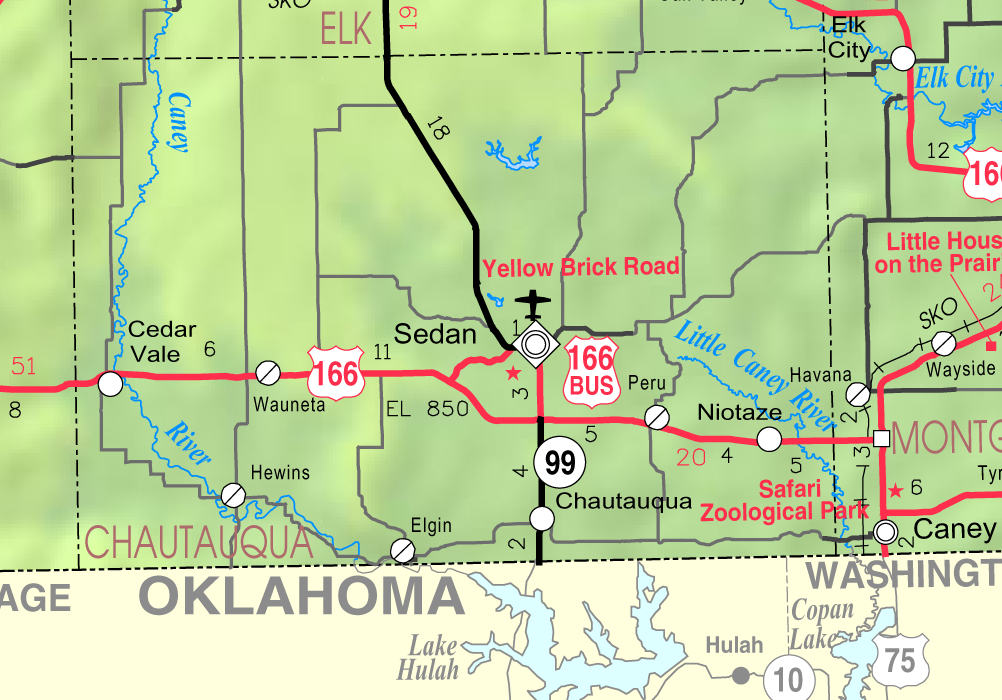
- KDOT map of Chautauqua County (legend)

- Location within Kansas Location within the United States
- Coordinates: 37°2′27″N 96°24′30″W
- Country: United States
- State: Kansas
- County: Chautauqua
- Named for: Edwin Hewins
- Elevation: 886 ft (270 m)
- Time zone: UTC-6 (CST)
  - Summer (DST): UTC-5 (CDT)
- Area code: 620
- FIPS code: 20-31625
- GNIS ID: 484429

Hewins is an unincorporated community in Chautauqua County, Kansas, United States.

== History ==
Hewins was named after Edwin M. Hewins, a rancher and member of the Kansas Legislature.

The post office was established April 4, 1906, and closed April 8, 1966.

A route through Hewins serves as an access point for nearby Osro Falls, an old covered wagon crossing point on the Caney River. The waterfall only measures about 3 feet in height, but extends nearly 200 feet across the river.
