= Salt Creek Township, Chautauqua County, Kansas =

Salt Creek Township
- Township
- Location in Chautauqua County
- Coordinates: 37°15′10″N 096°02′01″W
- Country: United States
- State: Kansas
- County: Chautauqua

Area
  - Total: 49.18 sq mi (127.38 km^{2})
  - Land: 49.01 sq mi (126.94 km^{2})
  - Water: 0.17 sq mi (0.43 km^{2}) 0.34%
- Elevation: 932 ft (284 m)

Population (2020)
  - Total: 118
  - Density: 2.3/sq mi (0.9/km^{2})
- GNIS feature ID: 0469536

Salt Creek Township is a township in Chautauqua County, Kansas, United States. As of the 2020 census, its population was 118.

== Geography ==
Salt Creek Township covers an area of 49.18 square miles (127.4 km^{2}) and contains no incorporated settlements. According to the USGS, it contains three cemeteries: Hale, Hardrock (Latitude: 37.19890, Longitude: -96.02670) and West Liberty.

The streams of Coffey Branch and Pan Creek run through this township.

== Transportation ==
Salt Creek Township contains one airport or landing strip, Rupp Airport.
