= Cedar Vale, Kansas =

City in Chautauqua County, Kansas

- City
- Location within Chautauqua County and Kansas

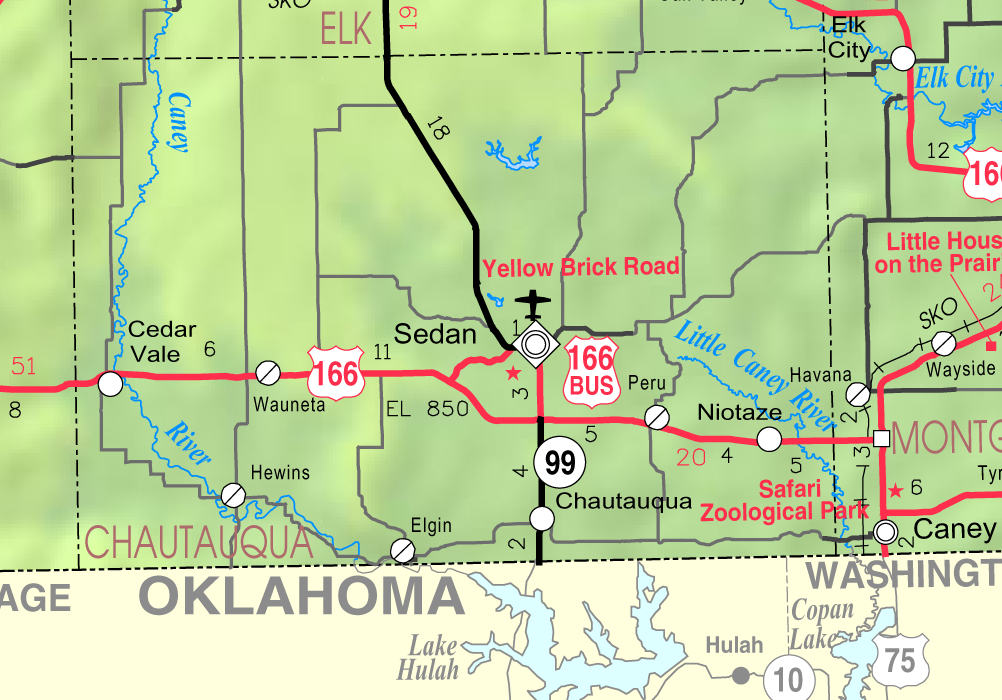
- KDOT map of Chautauqua County (legend)
- Coordinates: 37°06′20″N 96°30′00″W
- Country: United States
- State: Kansas
- County: Chautauqua
- Founded: 1870
- Incorporated: 1884

Area
  - Total: 0.75 sq mi (1.95 km^{2})
  - Land: 0.75 sq mi (1.95 km^{2})
  - Water: 0 sq mi (0.00 km^{2})
- Elevation: 984 ft (300 m)

Population (2020)
  - Total: 476
  - Density: 632/sq mi (244/km^{2})
- Time zone: UTC-6 (CST)
  - Summer (DST): UTC-5 (CDT)
- ZIP Code: 67024
- Area code: 620
- FIPS code: 20-11450
- GNIS ID: 2393777
- Website: cityofcedarvale.com

Cedar Vale is a city in Chautauqua County, Kansas, United States. As of the 2020 census, the population of the city was 476.

== History ==
Cedar Vale was founded in 1870. Its name is meant to be descriptive of the town's setting.

== Geography ==
According to the United States Census Bureau, the city has a total area of 0.76 square miles (1.97 km^{2}), all of it land.

=== Climate ===
The climate in this area is characterized by hot, humid summers and generally mild to cool winters. According to the Köppen Climate Classification system, Cedar Vale has a humid subtropical climate, abbreviated "Cfa" on climate maps.

== Demographics ==
Historical population
Census	Pop.	Note	%±
1880	218		—
1890	640		193.6%
1900	932		45.6%
1910	948		1.7%
1920	1,044		10.1%
1930	1,000		−4.2%
1940	952		−4.8%
1950	1,010		6.1%
1960	859		−15.0%
1970	665		−22.6%
1980	848		27.5%
1990	760		−10.4%
2000	723		−4.9%
2010	579		−19.9%
2020	476		−17.8%
U.S. Decennial Census

=== 2020 census ===
The 2020 United States census counted 476 people, 184 households, and 108 families in Cedar Vale. The population density was 631.3 per square mile (243.7/km^{2}). There were 305 housing units at an average density of 404.5 per square mile (156.2/km^{2}). The racial makeup was 79.41% (378) white or European American (78.36% non-Hispanic white), 1.89% (9) black or African-American, 9.24% (44) Native American or Alaska Native, 0.84% (4) Asian, 0.0% (0) Pacific Islander or Native Hawaiian, 0.63% (3) from other races, and 7.98% (38) from two or more races. Hispanic or Latino of any race was 4.62% (22) of the population.

Of the 184 households, 31.5% had children under the age of 18; 39.1% were married couples living together; 28.3% had a female householder with no spouse or partner present. 37.0% of households consisted of individuals and 19.6% had someone living alone who was 65 years of age or older. The average household size was 2.3 and the average family size was 2.8. The percent of those with a bachelor's degree or higher was estimated to be 8.8% of the population.

28.2% of the population was under the age of 18, 9.0% from 18 to 24, 23.5% from 25 to 44, 19.1% from 45 to 64, and 20.2% who were 65 years of age or older. The median age was 36.7 years. For every 100 females, there were 89.6 males. For every 100 females ages 18 and older, there were 85.9 males.

The 2016–2020 5-year American Community Survey estimates show that the median household income was $36,098 (with a margin of error of +/- $3,674) and the median family income was $38,409 (+/- $15,446). Males had a median income of $30,119 (+/- $5,278) versus $21,042 (+/- $7,447) for females. The median income for those above 16 years old was $25,893 (+/- $4,956). Approximately, 31.5% of families and 26.0% of the population were below the poverty line, including 22.0% of those under the age of 18 and 30.4% of those ages 65 or over.

=== 2010 census ===
As of the census of 2010, there were 579 people, 251 households, and 144 families living in the city. The population density was 761.8 inhabitants per square mile (294.1/km^{2}). There were 342 housing units at an average density of 450.0 per square mile (173.7/km^{2}). The racial makeup of the city was 91.5% White, 0.3% African American, 3.5% Native American, 0.2% Asian, and 4.5% from two or more races. Hispanic or Latino of any race were 1.9% of the population.

There were 251 households, of which 30.7% had children under the age of 18 living with them, 41.8% were married couples living together, 10.8% had a female householder with no husband present, 4.8% had a male householder with no wife present, and 42.6% were non-families. 37.8% of all households were made up of individuals, and 19.2% had someone living alone who was 65 years of age or older. The average household size was 2.27 and the average family size was 2.98.

The median age in the city was 43.9 years. 25.4% of residents were under the age of 18; 7.3% were between the ages of 18 and 24; 18.1% were from 25 to 44; 27.2% were from 45 to 64; and 22.1% were 65 years of age or older. The gender makeup of the city was 50.3% male and 49.7% female.

=== 2000 census ===
As of the census of 2000, there were 723 people, 285 households, and 184 families living in the city. The population density was 758.8 inhabitants per square mile (293.0/km^{2}). There were 344 housing units at an average density of 361.0 per square mile (139.4/km^{2}). The racial makeup of the city was 92.67% White, 0.41% African American, 4.15% Native American, 1.11% from other races, and 1.66% from two or more races. Hispanic or Latino of any race were 2.07% of the population.

There were 285 households, out of which 29.5% had children under the age of 18 living with them, 51.9% were married couples living together, 8.4% had a female householder with no husband present, and 35.1% were non-families. 33.3% of all households were made up of individuals, and 22.5% had someone living alone who was 65 years of age or older. The average household size was 2.29 and the average family size was 2.91.

In the city, the population was spread out, with 24.6% under the age of 18, 4.6% from 18 to 24, 18.3% from 25 to 44, 23.5% from 45 to 64, and 29.0% who were 65 years of age or older. The median age was 47 years. For every 100 females, there were 92.8 males. For every 100 females age 18 and over, there were 84.7 males.

The median income for a household in the city was $27,031, and the median income for a family was $33,889. Males had a median income of $24,167 versus $19,688 for females. The per capita income for the city was $14,410. About 11.1% of families and 14.7% of the population were below the poverty line, including 19.2% of those under age 18 and 14.5% of those age 65 or over.

== Education ==
The community is served by Cedar Vale USD 285 public school district.

== Media ==
The Cedar Vale Star newspaper was created in 1884, and it continued until January 1894.
