= Wauneta, Kansas =

Unincorporated community in Chautauqua County, Kansas

- Unincorporated community
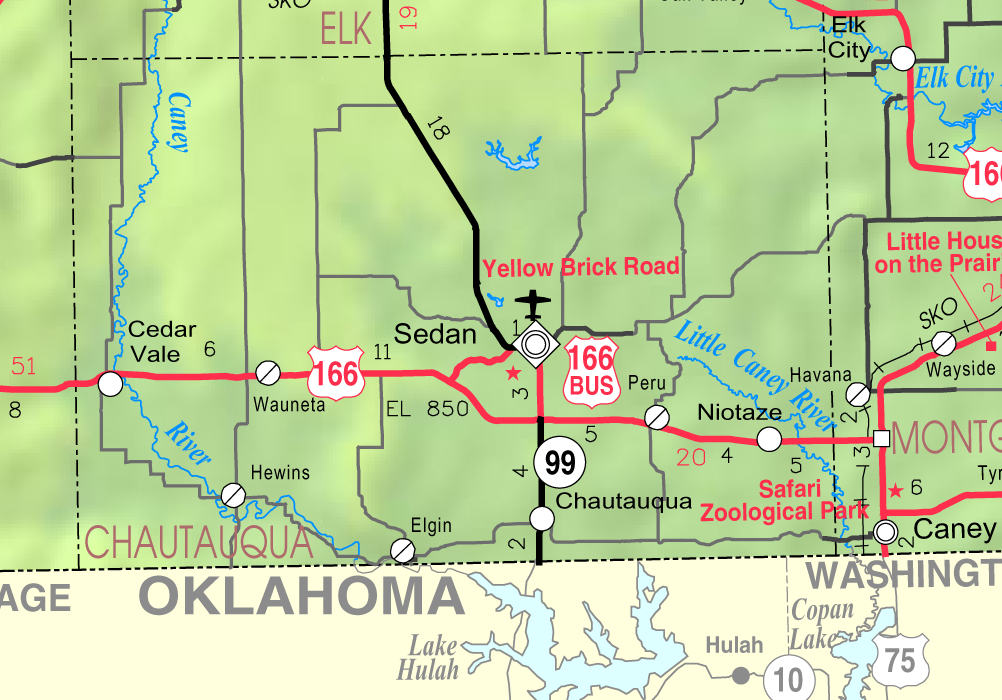
- KDOT map of Chautauqua County (legend)

- Location within Kansas Location within the United States
- Coordinates: 37°06′47″N 96°22′50″W
- Country: United States
- State: Kansas
- County: Chautauqua
- Elevation: 961 ft (293 m)
- Time zone: UTC-6 (CST)
  - Summer (DST): UTC-5 (CDT)
- Area code: 620
- FIPS code: 20-76025
- GNIS ID: 484426

Wauneta is an unincorporated community in Chautauqua County, Kansas, United States.

== History ==
Wauneta once had a post office; it closed in 1961. Wauneta once also had a grocery store, gas station and auto repair shop.
