= Belleville Township, Chautauqua County, Kansas =

Belleville Township
- Township
- Location in Chautauqua County
- Coordinates: 37°03′00″N 096°10′25″W
- Country: United States
- State: Kansas
- County: Chautauqua

Area
  - Total: 59.75 sq mi (154.74 km^{2})
  - Land: 59.66 sq mi (154.52 km^{2})
  - Water: 0.085 sq mi (0.22 km^{2}) 0.14%
- Elevation: 915 ft (279 m)

Population (2020)
  - Total: 458
  - Density: 7.8/sq mi (3/km^{2})
- GNIS feature ID: 0470239

Belleville Township is a township in Chautauqua County, Kansas, United States. As of the 2020 census, its population was 458.

== Geography ==
Belleville Township covers an area of 59.74 square miles (154.7 km^{2}) and contains two incorporated settlements: Chautauqua and Peru. According to the USGS, it contains seven cemeteries: Booth, Findley, Marshall, McClarney, Oak Grove, Oak Hill and Peru.

The streams of Harper Creek, Otter Creek and Possum Trot Creek run through this township.

== Transportation ==
Belleville Township contains one airport or landing strip, Walter Landing Strip.
