= Elgin, Kansas =

City in Chautauqua County, Kansas

- City
- Location within Chautauqua County and Kansas

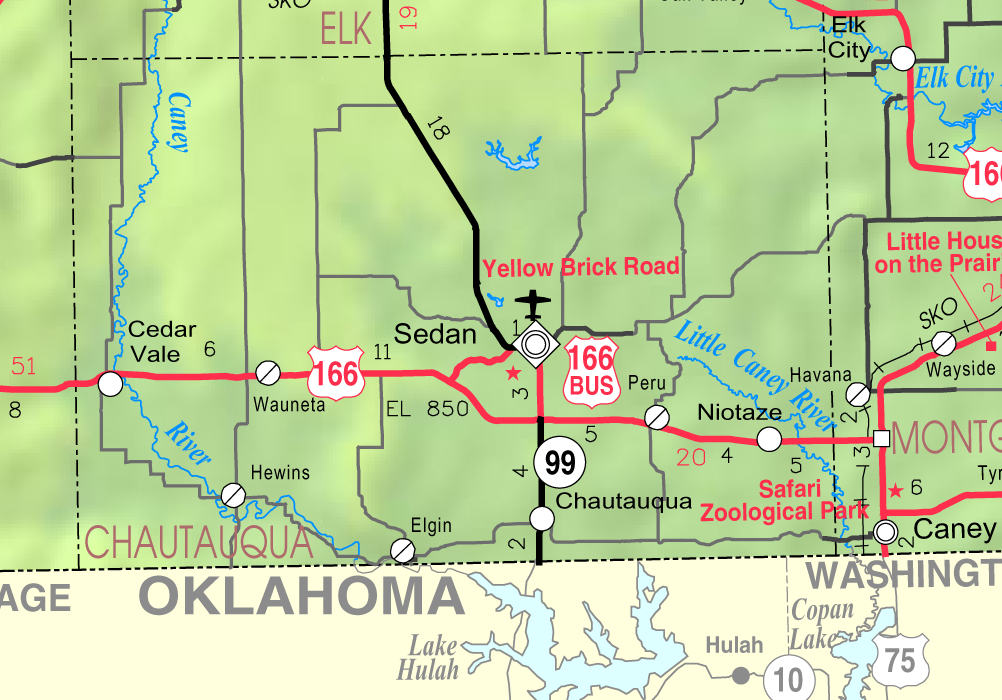
- KDOT map of Chautauqua County (legend)
- Coordinates: 37°00′06″N 96°16′50″W
- Country: United States
- State: Kansas
- County: Chautauqua
- Founded: 1869
- Incorporated: 1919

Area
  - Total: 0.20 sq mi (0.51 km^{2})
  - Land: 0.19 sq mi (0.50 km^{2})
  - Water: 0 sq mi (0.00 km^{2})
- Elevation: 787 ft (240 m)

Population (2020)
  - Total: 60
  - Density: 310/sq mi (120/km^{2})
- Time zone: UTC-6 (CST)
  - Summer (DST): UTC-5 (CDT)
- Area code: 620
- FIPS code: 20-20125
- GNIS ID: 2394644

Elgin is a city in Chautauqua County, Kansas, United States. As of the 2020 census, the population of the city was 60. The south edge of the city is the Kansas-Oklahoma state line.

== History ==
Elgin was founded in 1869. It was once a stop on the Atchison, Topeka and Santa Fe railroad and one of the world's busiest cattle shipping towns. L. P. Getman established the first store in the county, at Elgin, and John Lee, William Gamble and Beadle Welsh started the first saw mill at the same place, which they brought from Wisconsin in 1870. After the decline of the cattle shipping business, it was sustained by an oil boom that lasted until the mid-1920s.

The post office in Elgin was discontinued in 1976.

== Geography ==
According to the United States Census Bureau, the city has a total area of 0.20 square miles (0.52 km^{2}), all of it land.

== Demographics ==
Historical population
Census	Pop.	Note	%±
1880	55		—
1920	600		—
1930	446		−25.7%
1940	336		−24.7%
1950	212		−36.9%
1960	143		−32.5%
1970	115		−19.6%
1980	139		20.9%
1990	118		−15.1%
2000	82		−30.5%
2010	89		8.5%
2020	60		−32.6%
U.S. Decennial Census

=== 2020 census ===
The 2020 United States census counted 60 people, 24 households, and 19 families in Elgin. The population density was 307.7 per square mile (118.8/km^{2}). There were 49 housing units at an average density of 251.3 per square mile (97.0/km^{2}). The racial makeup was 85.0% (51) white or European American (80.0% non-Hispanic white), 0.0% (0) black or African-American, 5.0% (3) Native American or Alaska Native, 0.0% (0) Asian, 0.0% (0) Pacific Islander or Native Hawaiian, 0.0% (0) from other races, and 10.0% (6) from two or more races. Hispanic or Latino of any race was 6.67% (4) of the population.

Of the 24 households, 20.8% had children under the age of 18; 62.5% were married couples living together; 16.7% had a female householder with no spouse or partner present. 20.8% of households consisted of individuals and 8.3% had someone living alone who was 65 years of age or older. The average household size was 2.1 and the average family size was 2.8. The percent of those with a bachelor's degree or higher was estimated to be 0.0% of the population.

13.3% of the population was under the age of 18, 3.3% from 18 to 24, 25.0% from 25 to 44, 28.3% from 45 to 64, and 30.0% who were 65 years of age or older. The median age was 51.0 years. For every 100 females, there were 71.4 males. For every 100 females ages 18 and older, there were 85.7 males.

The 2016–2020 5-year American Community Survey estimates show that the median household income was $34,167 (with a margin of error of +/- $24,235) and the median family income was $36,563 (+/- $25,081). Males had a median income of $47,813 (+/- $9,798). Approximately, 33.3% of families and 25.5% of the population were below the poverty line, including 0.0% of those under the age of 18 and 20.0% of those ages 65 or over.

=== 2010 census ===
As of the census of 2010, there were 89 people, 40 households, and 24 families residing in the city. The population density was 445.0 inhabitants per square mile (171.8/km^{2}). There were 57 housing units at an average density of 285.0 per square mile (110.0/km^{2}). The racial makeup of the city was 88.8% White, 3.4% Native American, and 7.9% from two or more races. Hispanic or Latino of any race were 1.1% of the population.

There were 40 households, of which 22.5% had children under the age of 18 living with them, 40.0% were married couples living together, 10.0% had a female householder with no husband present, 10.0% had a male householder with no wife present, and 40.0% were non-families. 37.5% of all households were made up of individuals, and 20% had someone living alone who was 65 years of age or older. The average household size was 2.23 and the average family size was 2.96.

The median age in the city was 44.5 years. 15.7% of residents were under the age of 18; 10.1% were between the ages of 18 and 24; 24.7% were from 25 to 44; 29.2% were from 45 to 64; and 20.2% were 65 years of age or older. The gender makeup of the city was 53.9% male and 46.1% female.

=== 2000 census ===
As of the census of 2000, there were 82 people, 44 households, and 22 families residing in the city. The population density was 441.8 inhabitants per square mile (170.6/km^{2}). There were 54 housing units at an average density of 290.9 per square mile (112.3/km^{2}). The racial makeup of the city was 91.46% White and 8.54% Native American.

There were 44 households, out of which 18.2% had children under the age of 18 living with them, 36.4% were married couples living together, 6.8% had a female householder with no husband present, and 50.0% were non-families. 50.0% of all households were made up of individuals, and 29.5% had someone living alone who was 65 years of age or older. The average household size was 1.86 and the average family size was 2.59.

In the city, the population was spread out, with 22.0% under the age of 18, 3.7% from 18 to 24, 17.1% from 25 to 44, 26.8% from 45 to 64, and 30.5% who were 65 years of age or older. The median age was 52 years. For every 100 females, there were 90.7 males. For every 100 females age 18 and over, there were 73.0 males.

The median income for a household in the city was $14,500, and the median income for a family was $21,563. Males had a median income of $21,250 versus $14,583 for females. The per capita income for the city was $9,993. There were 21.1% of families and 17.9% of the population living below the poverty line, including no under eighteens and 20.7% of those over 64.

== Education ==
Elgin is served by Chautauqua County USD 286 public school district, and its Sedan Jr/Sr High School is located in Sedan.

== Notable people ==
- Louis F. Burns, Osage Indian historian and author
