= Black Bear Creek =

Stream in Oklahoma, United States

Coordinates: 36°24′47″N 96°37′24″W

Black Bear Creek is a 116-mile-long (187 km) creek in northern Oklahoma. Black Bear Creek drains an area of 538 square miles (1,390 km^{2}) in Garfield County, Noble County and Pawnee County, Oklahoma. It takes on a red color from the red clay of this area. The creek gets its name from the black bear. Though the area is outside of the range of the black bear, sightings have been rumored.

The creek's confluence with the Arkansas River is located in Pawnee County northwest of the town of Blackburn. Its tributaries are: Camp Creek, Cow Creek, Gansel Creek, Garber Creek, Garber Field Creek. Lutheran Creek, St. John Creek and Shale Creek.

== Discharge ==
A USGS stream gauge on the creek at Pawnee recorded a mean annual discharge of 214.2 cubic feet per second (6.07 m^{3}/s) during water years 1945-2019.

== Flood control ==
The 2014 Farm Bill included an appropriation of $26.4 billion to assess or rehabilitate dams in Oklahoma. One of the many dams to be rehabilitated is known as Perry Lake Dam (officially named Upper Black Bear Creek Watershed Dam No. 62). The lake provides water to the town of Perry, Oklahoma, which is about 25 miles (40 km) northwest of Stillwater, Oklahoma. This dam, built in 1963, also is used for flood control protection along the creek.

Nineteen flood control dams have been constructed along Lower Black Bear Watershed Project. Before these were built, flooding was a serious problem. Seven major floods (Note: Major floods are defined as, "... those where flood water covered more than 50 percent of the floodplain") and 73 minor floods occurred between 1933 and 1954 in Payne and Noble counties.

One example of a flood control dam along the creek is Lower Black Bear Creek Watershed Dam No. 19M, in southern Pawnee County, was built in 1980 and created Lone Chimney Lake. The surface of the lake is 550 acres (220 ha). An additional benefit is that the lake provides 40 percent of the municipal water consumed by Cleveland and Pawnee. It is also the sole or primary water source for the smaller towns of Blackburn, Glencoe, Meramec, Morrison, Skeedee, Terlton and Yale.
