= Twomile Creek =

Twomile Creek may refer to:

- Twomile Creek (Chattahoochee River tributary), a stream in Georgia
- Twomile Creek (Marmaton River), a stream in Missouri
- Twomile Creek (North Fork Salt River), a stream in Missouri
- Twomile Creek (Warm Fork Spring River), a stream in Missouri
- Twomile Creek (Uwharrie River tributary), a stream in Randolph County, North Carolina
- Twomile Creek (East Branch Oil Creek tributary), a stream in Crawford County, Pennsylvania
- Twomile Creek (Kanawha River), a stream in West Virginia
- Twomile Creek (Nepco Lake tributary), a stream in Wisconsin
- Two Mile Creek (Yellow River tributary), a stream in Wisconsin
