= Marmaton Township, Bourbon County, Kansas =

Marmaton Township
- Township
- Location in Bourbon County
- Coordinates: 37°48′45″N 094°49′21″W
- Country: United States
- State: Kansas
- County: Bourbon

Area
  - Total: 56.12 sq mi (145.34 km^{2})
  - Land: 56.04 sq mi (145.14 km^{2})
  - Water: 0.077 sq mi (0.2 km^{2}) 0.14%
- Elevation: 820 ft (250 m)

Population (2000)
  - Total: 815
  - Density: 15/sq mi (5.6/km^{2})
- GNIS feature ID: 0474758

Marmaton Township is a township in Bourbon County, Kansas, United States. As of the 2000 census, its population was 815.

== History ==
Marmaton is a corruption of Marmiton, a French name given by fur traders meaning "scullion".

== Geography ==
Marmaton Township covers an area of 56.11 square miles (145.3 km^{2}) and contains one city, Redfield, and the unincorporated community of Marmotan. According to the USGS, it contains two cemeteries: Marmaton and Woods.

The largest section of scenic Hollister Wildlife Area, containing portions of Pawnee Creek and Elm Creek, is located in the south. Bunion Creek, Cedar Creek, Chambers Branch, Paint Creek and Robinson Branch also run through the township.

== Transportation ==
Marmaton Township is the site of Fort Scott Municipal Airport, a municipally owned general aviation airport and landing strip.
