= Barnesville =

Barnesville may refer to:

In Canada:

- Barnesville, New Brunswick

In the USA:

- Barnesville, Alabama
- Barnesville, Georgia
- Barnesville, Kansas
  - Barnesville's Post
- Barnesville, Maryland
  - Barnesville (MARC station)
- Barnesville, Minnesota
- Barnesville, Clinton County, Missouri
- Barnesville, Macon County, Missouri
- Barnesville, North Carolina
- Barnesville, Ohio
  - Barnesville Baltimore and Ohio Railroad Depot
- Barnesville, Pennsylvania
- Barnesville Township, Clay County, Minnesota
