= Drywood =

Drywood or Dry Wood may refer to:

- Dry Wood, Kansas
- Drywood Township, Bourbon County, Kansas
- Drywood, Wisconsin
- Camp Drywood
- Drywood Formation

== See also ==
- Wood drying
