= Marmaton, Kansas =

- Unincorporated community
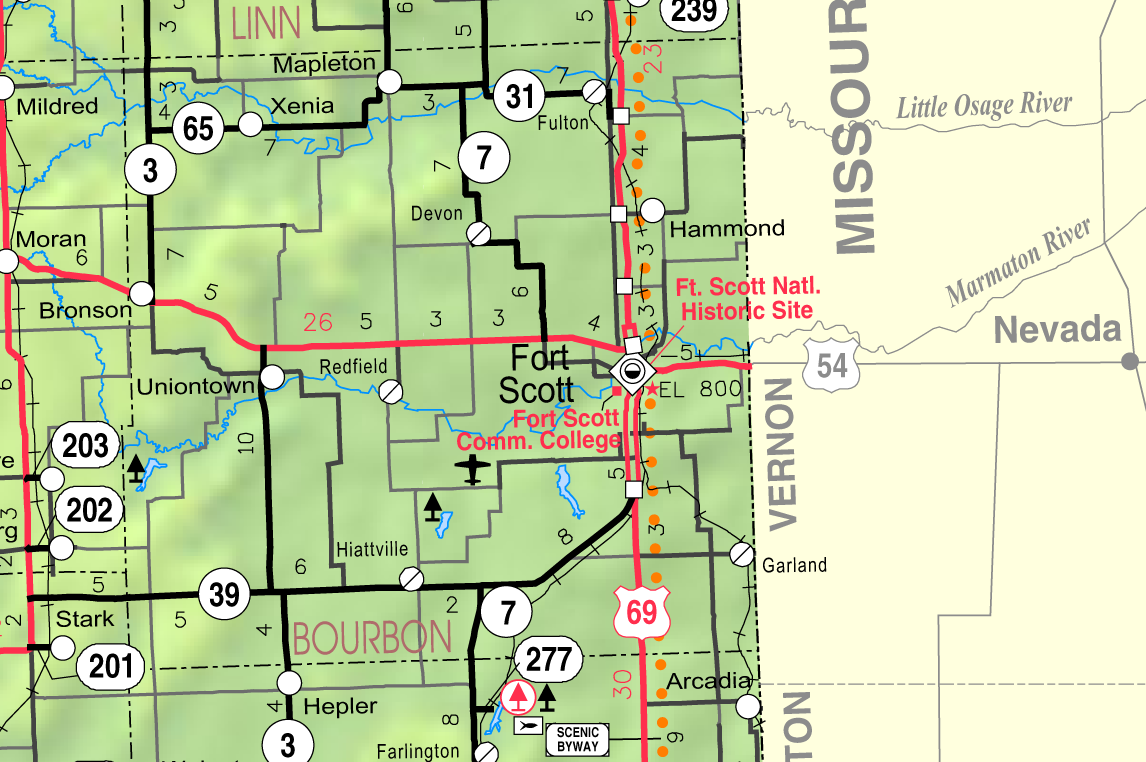
- KDOT map of Bourbon County (legend)
- Coordinates: 37°49′55″N 94°49′29″W
- Country: United States
- State: Kansas
- County: Bourbon
- Township: Marmaton
- Incorporated: 1858
- Elevation: 853 ft (260 m)
- Time zone: UTC-6 (CST)
  - Summer (DST): UTC-5 (CDT)
- Area code: 620
- FIPS code: 20-44875
- GNIS ID: 474764

Marmaton is an unincorporated community in Bourbon County, Kansas, United States. The community is located three miles east of Redfield, and two miles south of U.S. Route 54 at the intersection of 155th Street and Limestone Road.

== History ==
Marmaton was incorporated in 1858. It was named for the Marmaton River, which crosses the township. Marmaton is a corruption of Marmiton, a French name given by fur traders meaning "scullion".

The mailing address for residents of Marmaton is Fort Scott.
