= Marion Township, Bourbon County, Kansas =

Marion Township
- Township
- Location in Bourbon County
- Coordinates: 37°50′05″N 094°59′26″W
- Country: United States
- State: Kansas
- County: Bourbon

Area
  - Total: 100.24 sq mi (259.62 km^{2})
  - Land: 100.05 sq mi (259.12 km^{2})
  - Water: 0.19 sq mi (0.5 km^{2}) 0.19%
- Elevation: 873 ft (266 m)

Population (2000)
  - Total: 1,165
  - Density: 12/sq mi (4.5/km^{2})
- GNIS feature ID: 0474535

Marion Township is a township in Bourbon County, Kansas, United States. As of the 2000 census, its population was 1,165.

== Geography ==
Marion Township covers an area of 100.24 square miles (259.6 km^{2}) and contains two incorporated settlements: Bronson and Uniontown. According to the USGS, it contains five cemeteries: Hatch, Marion, Mount Zion, Turkey Creek and Walnut Hill.

The streams of Dyer Creek, Hinton Creek, Turkey Creek, Walnut Creek, West Fork Dry Wood Creek and Wolfpen Creek run through this township.
