= National Register of Historic Places listings in Bourbon County, Kansas =

Location of Bourbon County in Kansas

This is a list of the National Register of Historic Places listings in Bourbon County, Kansas.

This is intended to be a complete list of the properties and districts on the National Register of Historic Places in Bourbon County, Kansas, United States. The locations of National Register properties and districts for which the latitude and longitude coordinates are included below, may be seen in a map.

There are 14 properties and districts listed on the National Register in the county.

This National Park Service list is complete through NPS recent listings posted March 21, 2025.

== Current listings ==
	Name on the Register	Image	Date listed	Location	City or town	Description
1	Claude and Alberta Brant House		September 27, 2022 (#100008241)	216 South Eddy St. 37°50′21″N 94°42′39″W	Fort Scott	
2	First Congregational Church	First Congregational Church	March 23, 2005 (#05000200)	502 S. National Ave. 37°50′11″N 94°42′27″W	Fort Scott	
3	First Presbyterian Church	First Presbyterian Church	July 2, 2008 (#08000619)	308 S. Crawford St. 37°50′19″N 94°42′36″W	Fort Scott	
4	Fort Scott Downtown Historic District	Fort Scott Downtown Historic District	December 18, 2009 (#09001091)	Oak to 3rd St. and Scott Ave. to National Ave. 37°50′27″N 94°42′22″W	Fort Scott	
5	Fort Scott National Cemetery	Fort Scott National Cemetery	July 15, 1999 (#99000835)	900 East National Ave. 37°49′18″N 94°41′36″W	Fort Scott	
6	Fort Scott National Historic Site	Fort Scott National Historic Site	October 15, 1966 (#66000106)	Old Fort Boulevard; 37°50′38″N 94°42′17″W	Fort Scott	
7	Fort Scott Public Carnegie Library	Fort Scott Public Carnegie Library	August 18, 1987 (#87000930)	201 S. National; 37°50′23″N 94°42′25″W	Fort Scott	
8	Fulton High School and Grade School	Fulton High School and Grade School	October 5, 2015 (#15000688)	408 W. Osage St. 38°00′35″N 94°43′16″W	Fulton	
9	Thomas L. and Anna B. Herbert House		December 23, 2021 (#100007280)	512 South Judson Street; 37°50′10″N 94°42′31″W	Fort Scott	
10	Long Shoals Bridge	Long Shoals Bridge	January 4, 1990 (#89002182)	Over the Little Osage River east of Fulton; 37°59′41″N 94°37′18″W	Fulton	Metal Truss Bridges in Kansas 1861--1939 MPS apporoved for move 7/18/2012
11	Marmaton Bridge		May 11, 1982 (#82002652)	1 mile northeast of Fort Scott; 37°51′33″N 94°40′14″W	Fort Scott	
12	Moody Building	Moody Building	November 9, 1977 (#77000570)	15 E. 2nd St. 37°50′24″N 94°42′23″W	Fort Scott	
13	Union Block	Union Block	April 26, 1972 (#72000489)	24 S. Main St. 37°50′28″N 94°42′23″W	Fort Scott	
14	Eugene Ware Elementary School	Eugene Ware Elementary School	June 9, 2005 (#05000552)	900 E. 3rd St. 37°50′18″N 94°41′49″W	Fort Scott	

== See also ==
- List of National Historic Landmarks in Kansas
- National Register of Historic Places listings in Kansas
