= Uniontown High School =

Uniontown High School may refer to:

- Uniontown Area High School, Uniontown, Pennsylvania
- Uniontown Jr/Sr High School, Uniontown USD 235, Uniontown, Kansas
