= Pawnee Creek =

Pawnee Creek may refer to:

- Pawnee Creek (Colorado), a tributary of the South Platte River
- Pawnee Creek (Kansas), a stream in Bourbon and Crawford counties
