= Pete Martinez =

American rodeo performer

- Born: Pedro Pablo Martinez; April 29, 1894; Porterville, California, U.S.
- Died: August 30, 1971 (aged 77); Tucson, Arizona, U.S.
- Education: California School of Fine Arts, San Francisco, Pennsylvania Fine Arts Academy
- Known for: Art; Printmaker, illustrator, watercolorist
- Movement: landscape, regionalism, cowboy

Pete Martinez (April 29, 1894 – August 30, 1971) was an American cowboy artist who specialized in drawing, printmaking, and watercolor. He is best known for his illustration and prints of Arizona desert landscapes and images of cowboy life.

== Life ==
In the early twentieth century a broad range of dynamic artists called Tucson, Arizona home. A collection of cowboys and rodeo stars picked up bushes, charcoal and pencils and began depicted the Arizona landscape. One of these individuals was Pete Martinez.

Martinez was born in Porterville California in 1894. He was raised in the area adjoining Deer Creek where his father worked as a cowboy and rancher. When his father was bitten by a rattlesnake and died Pete began supporting his family at the age of twelve. He followed his father's footsteps becoming cowboy. He rode herd for some major outfits including the Santa Rita Ranch of Los Banos, California, owned by the famed cattle kings Miller and Lux. He served as top rider for Mrs. George Coffee on her mountain Ranch in the Greenhorn Mountains in Kern County, California.

Martinez's horsemanship was recognized by racehorse owners throughout central California. He earned extra money riding these horses at the county fair. He developed into a superb roper, a skill that would transform him into rodeo star.

At an early age Pete began to draw the ranch experiences. He was encouraged by his fellow cowhands, who recognized the tactile authenticity of his drawings. It was not until 1915, with a small family inheritance that Pete was able to move to San Francisco began his formal art training. He entered the Mark Hopkins Institute of Art, later called the California School of Fine Arts.

One day he showed his instructor a sketch of a horse. The teacher advised Pete to go immediately to cattle country “where he might discover something.” Pete Headed to Elko, Nevada. For three years Pete studied art in the winter and rode the ranges of Nevada in the Summer. He started as a string rider and in two years rose to foreman. Martinez described the period in his own words: “Bad Horses to ride and good scenery to paint.”

While working for the Union Land and Cattle Company, Nevada's largest ranching operation that he met Will James. And it was during this time that Jack Van Ryder worked as a hired hand for Martinez.

Martinez moved to Philadelphia to study at the Pennsylvania Academy of Fine Arts where he developed his skill as an etcher, winning an award from the Graphic Sketch Club of Philadelphia. He also studied at the Art Student League in New York, where he kept a studio in the Woolworth Building. To supplement his income he performed on the rodeo circuit in New York and Boston, competing in Madison Square Garden During the 1932 World Series Rodeo he joined up with other "hard-riding artist" including, Henry Ziegler and Harmon Pritchard. They created an art gallery at the entrance of the corridor at Madison Square Garden.

During World War I Martinez served in France. Returning to the states he enrolled for two years in the Pennsylvania Fine Arts Academy.

== New York ==
Pete enrolled in the Arts Students League in New York maintaining a studio in the Woolworth Building.

During these years Pete was augmenting his income as a rodeo contestant. He became a top performer in the eastern circuit. At one of the Madison Square Garden rodeos he was the only contestant to enter all the bronc riding, bull riding, and calf roping event participating for the full 27 days.

== Tucson ==
In 1932 on the Southwestern Rodeo circuit, Martinez performed in the Fiesta del los Vaqueros in Tucson. He met Victoria Kellner (aunt of the baseball pitcher Alex Kellner) and the two married.

The couple purchased a small ranch near Prince Road and Tucson Blvd, near the home of Maynard Dixon’s and down the street from the original Ettore DeGrazia Studio.

Martinez's art was known to captures the raw roughness of the wild range. A soft wooliness that does not sacrifice beauty.

Martinez painted a mural on the walls of the Hotel Congress bar Tap Room. A drop ceiling was added to the bar in the 1960s covering the murals. The mural remain one of Tucson's great lost artworks.

== Legacy ==
Perhaps his most well-known work hangs in the Hotel Congress in downtown Tucson. For the famous Tap Room Bar, Martinez illustrated a series of drawings that depict the cowboy culture of the west.

Martinez died in Tucson on August 30, 1971, but his work continues to provide color and definition the Tucson and the West.

== Artwork ==
Pete Martinez was an artist who worked primarily in illustration and painting.
