= Fulton High School =

Fulton High School may refer to:

- Fulton High School, now merged into South Atlanta High School, Georgia
- Fulton High School (Illinois) in Fulton, Illinois
- Fulton High School (Kansas) formerly in Fulton, Kansas
- Fulton High School (Kentucky) in Fulton, Kentucky
- Fulton High School (Tennessee) in Knoxville, Tennessee
- Fulton High School in Fulton, Missouri - Fulton 58 School District
