= Fulton High School (Kansas) =

Fulton School

Location
- 408 West Osage Street; Fulton, Kansas 66738; United States; 38°0′36″N 94°43′16″W

Information
- Grades: Kindergarten to 12

Fulton School was a public school in Fulton in northeastern Bourbon County, Kansas. It was the school of Fulton School District 27, which was unified into Fort Scott USD 234 in 1965. Before unification, the school had kindergarten through high school.

The school board of Fort Scott USD 234 authorized the transfer of the Fulton School building to the city of Fulton on November 6, 1978. The school building became the Fulton Community Center.
