= Berlin, Kansas =

- Unincorporated community
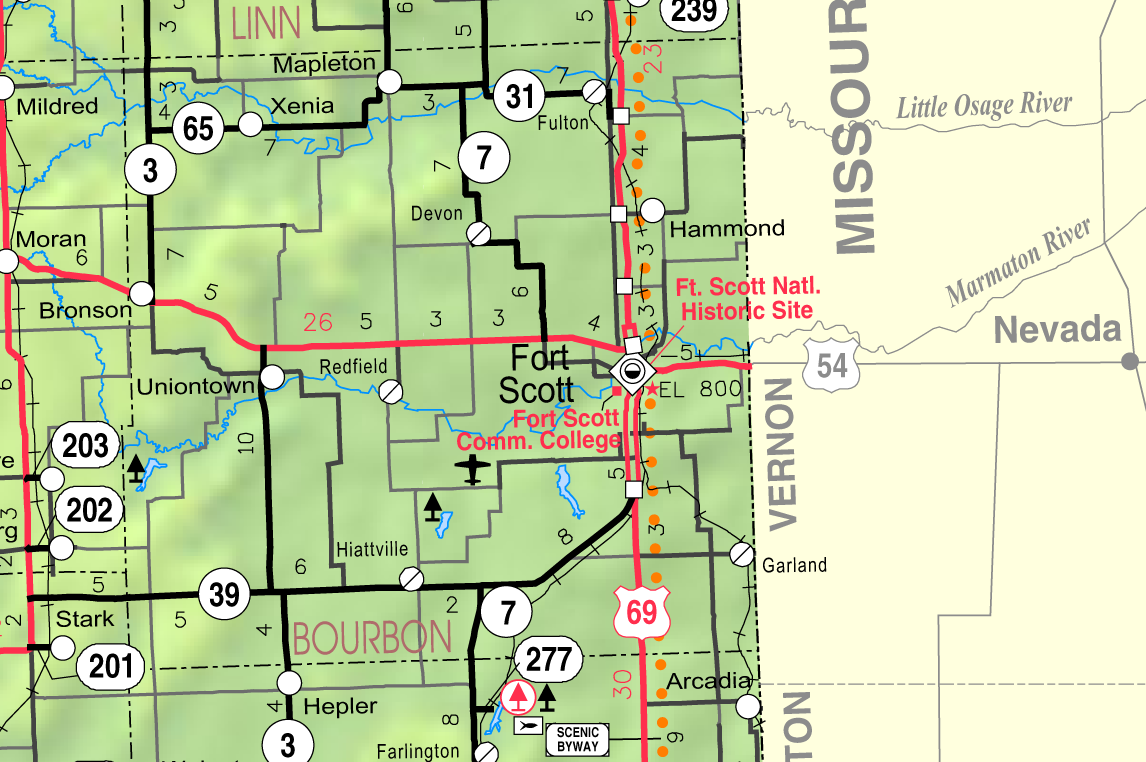
- KDOT map of Bourbon County (legend)
- Coordinates: 37°55′17″N 94°53′46″W
- Country: United States
- State: Kansas
- County: Bourbon
- Named for: Berlin, Georgia
- Elevation: 909 ft (277 m)
- Time zone: UTC-6 (CST)
  - Summer (DST): UTC-5 (CDT)
- Area code: 620
- FIPS code: 20-06240
- GNIS ID: 474538

Berlin is an unincorporated community in Bourbon County, Kansas, United States.

== History ==
A post office was opened in Berlin in 1879, and remained in operation until it was discontinued in 1903. The community has most likely been named in the honor of Berlin, Georgia.
