= Old Town Branch =

Stream in Vernon County, Missouri

Coordinates: 37.958924°N 94.333005°W

Old Town Branch is a stream in Vernon County in the U.S. state of Missouri. It is a tributary of the Marmaton River.

Old Town Branch was named for a former Indian settlement along its course.

== See also ==
- List of rivers of Missouri
