= Robinson Branch (Kansas) =

Stream in Bourbon County, Kansas, U.S.

Coordinates: 37.8250408°N 94.8669123°W

Robinson Branch is a stream in Bourbon County, Kansas, in the United States.

Robinson Branch was named after a local pioneer.

== See also ==
- List of rivers of Kansas
