= Pawnee Station, Kansas =

- Unincorporated community
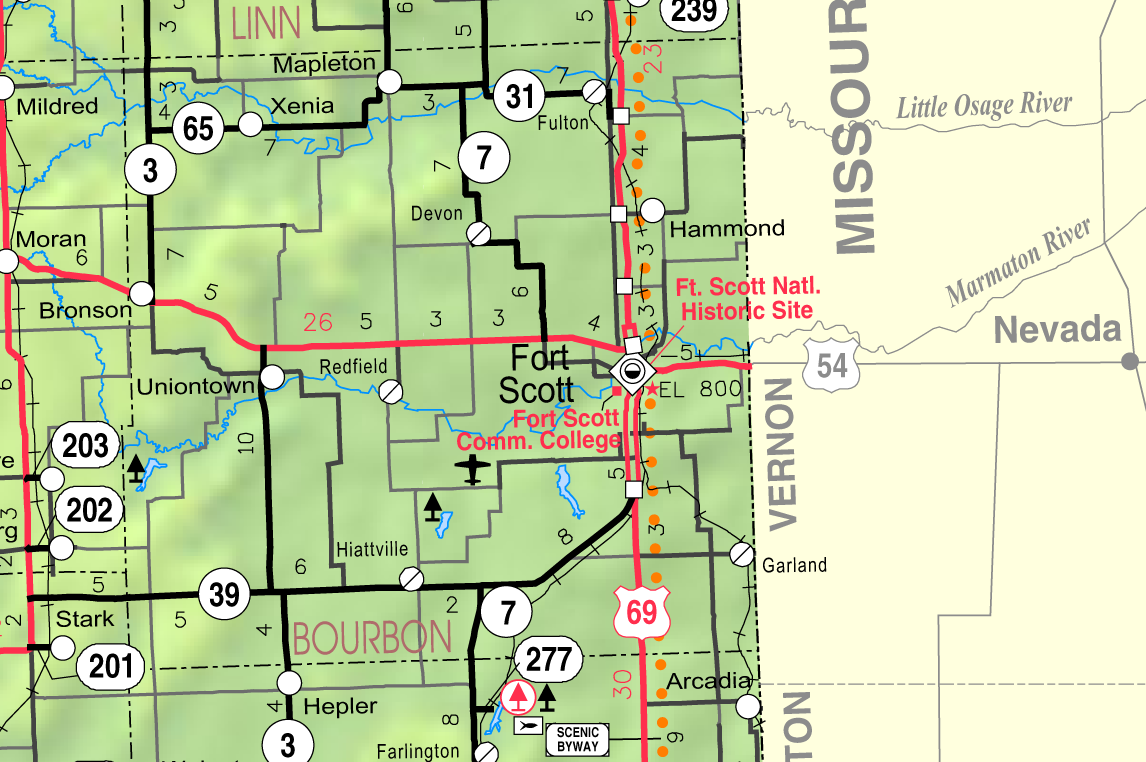
- KDOT map of Bourbon County (legend)
- Coordinates: 37°42′00″N 94°47′29″W
- Country: United States
- State: Kansas
- County: Bourbon
- Founded: 1871
- Elevation: 994 ft (303 m)
- Time zone: UTC-6 (CST)
  - Summer (DST): UTC-5 (CDT)
- Area code: 620
- FIPS code: 20-54910
- GNIS ID: 475000

Pawnee Station is an unincorporated community in Bourbon County, Kansas, United States.

== History ==
Pawnee Station was founded in 1871 when the railroad was extended to that point. The community took its name from Pawnee Creek. A post office was established at Pawnee Station in 1871, and remained in operation until 1945.
