= Fort Scott High School =

Public high school in Fort Scott, Kansas

Coordinates: 37.8298°N 94.7047°W

Fort Scott High School is a public high school in Fort Scott, Kansas, United States at 1005 South Main Street. It is operated by Fort Scott USD 234 public school district. The school mascot is a tiger and the school colors are red and white.

== Notable alumni ==
- Mark Hart (1971), multi-instrumentalist musician and member of the bands Crowded House and Supertramp who has worked with Ringo Starr.
- Adam LaRoche (1998), baseball player
- Andy LaRoche (2001), baseball player
- Alexandra McCord (1991), reality television personality known for starring in The Real Housewives of New York.

== See also ==
- List of high schools in Kansas
- List of unified school districts in Kansas
