= Hammond, Kansas =

- Unincorporated community
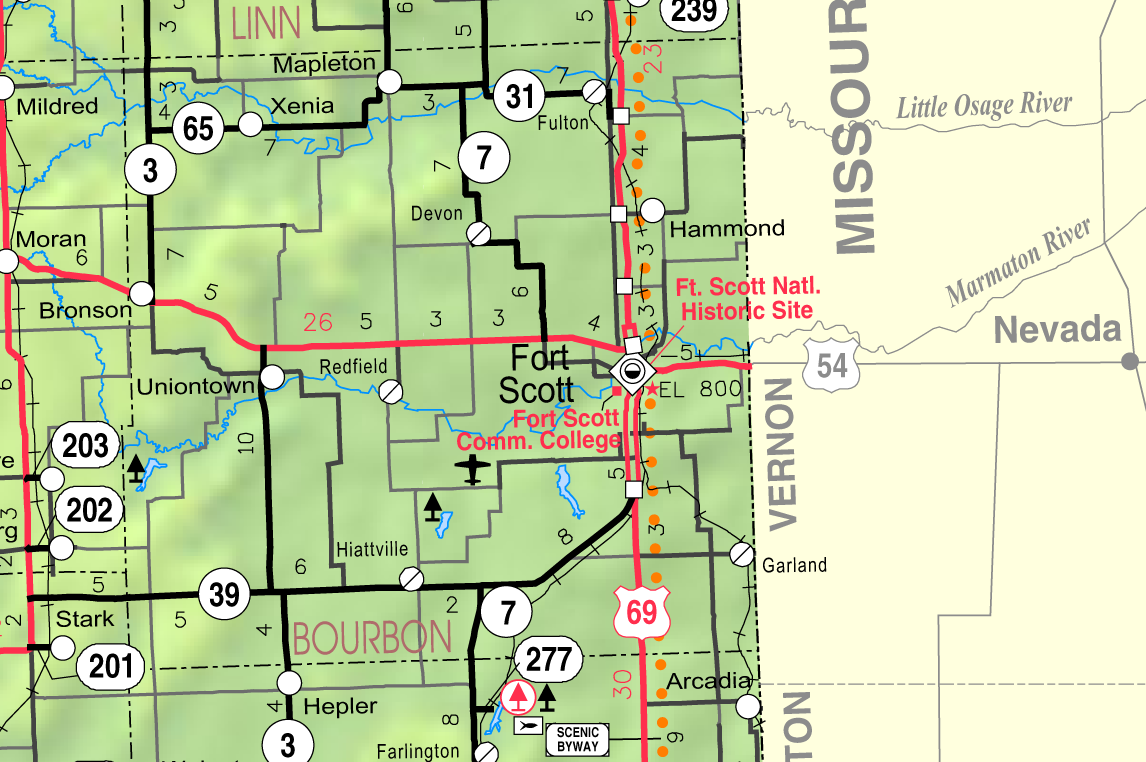
- KDOT map of Bourbon County (legend)
- Coordinates: 37°56′08″N 94°41′43″W
- Country: United States
- State: Kansas
- County: Bourbon
- Elevation: 869 ft (265 m)
- Time zone: UTC-6 (CST)
  - Summer (DST): UTC-5 (CDT)
- Area code: 620
- FIPS code: 20-29750
- GNIS ID: 474572

Hammond is an unincorporated community in Bourbon County, Kansas, United States.

== History ==
A post office was established at Hammond in 1877, and remained in operation until it was discontinued in 1968. The community was named for a family of early settlers.

== Education ==
The community is served by Fort Scott USD 234 public school district.
