= Bronson, Kansas =

- City
- Location within Bourbon County and Kansas

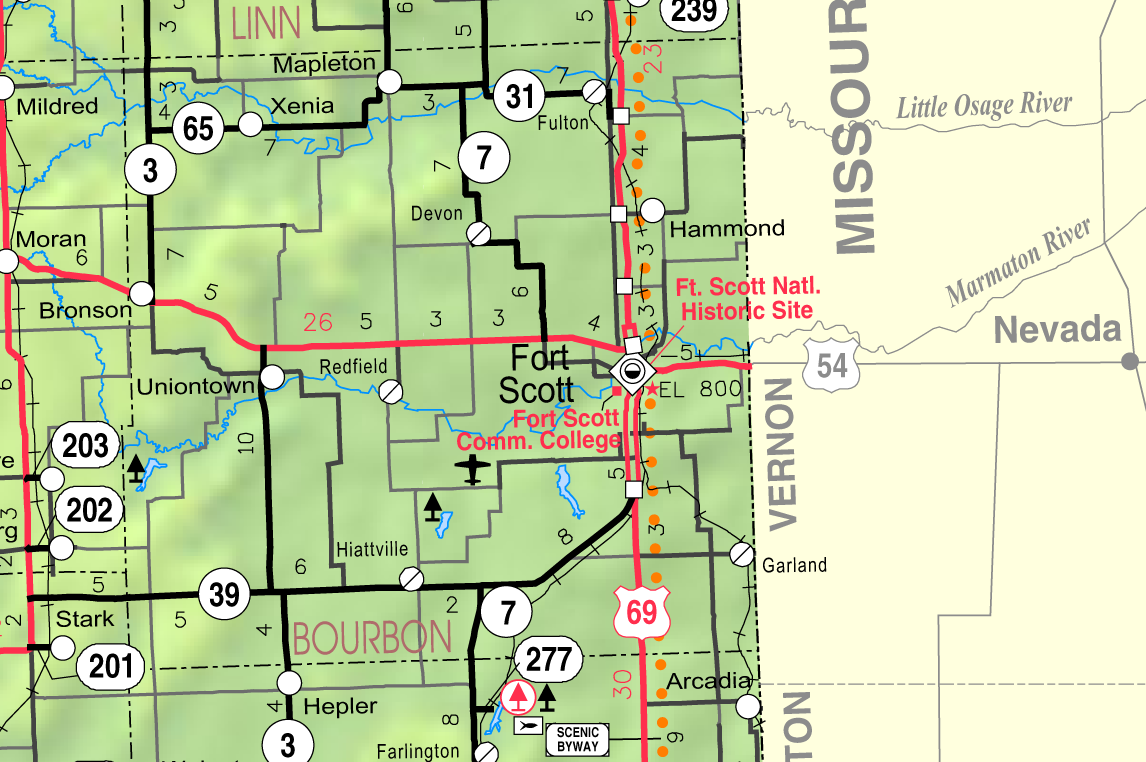
- KDOT map of Bourbon County (legend)
- Coordinates: 37°53′45″N 95°04′23″W
- Country: United States of America
- State: Kansas
- County: Bourbon
- Founded: 1880s
- Incorporated: 1881
- Named for: Ira Bronson

Area
  - Total: 0.45 sq mi (1.16 km^{2})
  - Land: 0.45 sq mi (1.16 km^{2})
  - Water: 0 sq mi (0.00 km^{2})
- Elevation: 1,070 ft (330 m)

Population (2020)
  - Total: 304
  - Density: 679/sq mi (262/km^{2})
- Time zone: UTC-6 (CST)
  - Summer (DST): UTC-5 (CDT)
- ZIP Code: 66716
- Area code: 620
- FIPS code: 20-08475
- GNIS ID: 2393424
- Website: www.cityofbronson.org

Bronson is a city in Bourbon County, Kansas, United States. As of the 2020 census, the population of the city was 304.

== History ==
Bronson was founded in the 1880s. The first store and post office opened in September 1881. The city was formerly named Wilsonville, but it was later renamed after Ira Bronson, a Fort Scott attorney. Bronson was moved to its current location when the Missouri Pacific Railroad bypassed the original town site.

Midway between Fort Scott and Iola on the highway and railroad, it became a prime shipping and supply point for the agricultural region. Growth was slow but steady. From a handful of residents in 1885, by the 1910 Census Bronson had 595 residents. In 1912 it had two banks, an international money-order post office with four rural routes, express and telegraph offices, telephone connections, the semi-weekly Bronson Pilot newspaper, a downtown retail district and public schools.

In 1910 Bronson held the world's first horseshoe pitch tournament.

== Geography ==
According to the United States Census Bureau, the city has a total area of 0.43 square miles (1.11 km^{2}), all land. U.S. Route 54 intersects K-3 on Bronson's east side.

== Demographics ==
Historical population
Census	Pop.	Note	%±
1890	352		—
1900	361		2.6%
1910	595		64.8%
1920	590		−0.8%
1930	450		−23.7%
1940	421		−6.4%
1950	415		−1.4%
1960	354		−14.7%
1970	397		12.1%
1980	414		4.3%
1990	343		−17.1%
2000	346		0.9%
2010	323		−6.6%
2020	304		−5.9%
U.S. Decennial Census

=== 2020 census ===
The 2020 United States census counted 304 people, 107 households, and 79 families in Bronson. The population density was 680.1 per square mile (262.6/km^{2}). There were 131 housing units at an average density of 293.1 per square mile (113.2/km^{2}). The racial makeup was 85.86% (261) white or European American (85.53% non-Hispanic white), 2.96% (9) black or African-American, 0.66% (2) Native American or Alaska Native, 0.33% (1) Asian, 0.0% (0) Pacific Islander or Native Hawaiian, 0.33% (1) from other races, and 9.87% (30) from two or more races. Hispanic or Latino of any race was 2.3% (7) of the population.

Of the 107 households, 31.8% had children under the age of 18; 54.2% were married couples living together; 22.4% had a female householder with no spouse or partner present. 24.3% of households consisted of individuals and 12.1% had someone living alone who was 65 years of age or older. The average household size was 3.4 and the average family size was 4.0. The percent of those with a bachelor's degree or higher was estimated to be 3.9% of the population.

33.2% of the population was under the age of 18, 6.9% from 18 to 24, 22.0% from 25 to 44, 18.8% from 45 to 64, and 19.1% who were 65 years of age or older. The median age was 32.3 years. For every 100 females, there were 88.8 males. For every 100 females ages 18 and older, there were 95.2 males.

The 2016–2020 5-year American Community Survey estimates show that the median household income was $38,750 (with a margin of error of +/- $20,430) and the median family income was $37,222 (+/- $18,081). Males had a median income of $33,750 (+/- $7,685) versus $20,769 (+/- $7,182) for females. The median income for those above 16 years old was $25,833 (+/- $9,278). Approximately, 13.3% of families and 20.6% of the population were below the poverty line, including 33.6% of those under the age of 18 and 19.6% of those ages 65 or over.

=== 2010 census ===
As of the census of 2010, there were 323 people, 131 households, and 83 families residing in the city. The population density was 751.2 inhabitants per square mile (290.0/km^{2}). There were 153 housing units at an average density of 355.8 per square mile (137.4/km^{2}). The racial makeup of the city was 90.1% White, 3.4% African American, 0.9% Native American, 3.7% from other races, and 1.9% from two or more races. Hispanic or Latino of any race were 6.2% of the population.

There were 131 households, of which 32.8% had children under the age of 18 living with them, 47.3% were married couples living together, 13.0% had a female householder with no husband present, 3.1% had a male householder with no wife present, and 36.6% were non-families. 34.4% of all households were made up of individuals, and 17.6% had someone living alone who was 65 years of age or older. The average household size was 2.47 and the average family size was 3.17.

The median age in the city was 39.6 years. 28.8% of residents were under the age of 18; 5.5% were between the ages of 18 and 24; 21.5% were from 25 to 44; 27.5% were from 45 to 64; and 16.7% were 65 years of age or older. The gender makeup of the city was 46.4% male and 53.6% female.

=== 2000 census ===
As of the census of 2000, there were 346 people, 147 households, and 93 families residing in the city. The population density was 814.3 inhabitants per square mile (314.4/km^{2}). There were 164 housing units at an average density of 386.0 per square mile (149.0/km^{2}). The racial makeup of the city was 94.51% White, 2.31% African American, 2.02% Native American, 0.29% Asian, 0.29% Pacific Islander, and 0.58% from two or more races. Hispanic or Latino of any race were 0.58% of the population.

There were 147 households, out of which 31.3% had children under the age of 18 living with them, 53.1% were married couples living together, 8.8% had a female householder with no husband present, and 36.1% were non-families. 34.7% of all households were made up of individuals, and 20.4% had someone living alone who was 65 years of age or older. The average household size was 2.35 and the average family size was 3.06.

In the city, the population was spread out, with 27.2% under the age of 18, 6.6% from 18 to 24, 24.6% from 25 to 44, 24.6% from 45 to 64, and 17.1% who were 65 years of age or older. The median age was 39 years. For every 100 females, there were 98.9 males. For every 100 females age 18 and over, there were 85.3 males.

The median income for a household in the city was $26,806, and the median income for a family was $32,656. Males had a median income of $25,588 versus $21,563 for females. The per capita income for the city was $12,332. About 11.4% of families and 13.8% of the population were below the poverty line, including 17.5% of those under age 18 and 23.9% of those age 65 or over.

== Education ==
The community is served by Uniontown USD 235 public school district. The Uniontown High School mascot is Eagles. Nearby Marmaton Valley USD 256 school district starts at the west edge of Bronson.

Bronson schools were closed through school unification. The Bronson high school mascot was Bulldogs.

== Notable people ==
- Jonathan M. Davis, Kansas state representative, senator, and 22nd Kansas governor; born, raised and buried in Bronson.
