= Chambers Branch =

Stream in Bourbon County, Kansas, U.S.

Coordinates: 37°48′38″N 94°46′51″W

Chambers Branch is a stream in Bourbon County, Kansas, in the United States. It is a tributary of the Marmaton River.

A pioneer settler gave Chambers Branch its name.

== See also ==
- List of rivers of Kansas
