= Paint Creek (Kansas) =

Stream in Bourbon County, Kansas, U.S.

Coordinates: 37.802819°N 94.814966°W

Paint Creek is a stream in Bourbon County, Kansas, in the United States.

Paint Creek was named from the fact Native Americans used ochre in this creek as body paint.

== See also ==
- List of rivers of Kansas
