= Osage Township, Bourbon County, Kansas =

Osage Township
- Township
- Location in Bourbon County
- Coordinates: 37°58′00″N 094°40′01″W
- Country: United States
- State: Kansas
- County: Bourbon

Area
  - Total: 48.39 sq mi (125.33 km^{2})
  - Land: 48.31 sq mi (125.13 km^{2})
  - Water: 0.077 sq mi (0.2 km^{2}) 0.16%
- Elevation: 850 ft (260 m)

Population (2000)
  - Total: 394
  - Density: 8.0/sq mi (3.1/km^{2})
- GNIS feature ID: 0474559

Osage Township is a township in Bourbon County, Kansas, United States. As of the 2000 census, its population was 394.

== Geography ==
Osage Township covers an area of 48.39 square miles (125.3 km^{2}) and contains no incorporated settlements. According to the USGS, it contains four cemeteries: Barnesville, Fairview, Maple Grove and West Liberty.

The Little Osage River and smaller streams of Fish Creek, Indian Creek and Moores Branch run through this township. Fish Creek, Indian Creek and Moores Branch all enter the Little Osage in Osage Township.

== Transportation ==
Osage Township contains two airports or landing strips: Emmerson Airport and Lyons Field.
