= Barnesville's Post =

Barnesville's Post located near Barnesville, in Bourbon County, Kansas, was the site of military camps for stretches of time during the American Civil War. The first mention of a camp there came from a report written on September 4, 1861, by Sen. James Lane. This was during the time Lane had evacuated Fort Scott and moved his forces to areas north of that post. A post was established at Barnesville. Lane wrote to Capt. W. E. Prince, then commanding Fort Leavenworth, "I am holding Barnesville . . . with an irregular force of about 250 men, stationed in log buildings, and am now strengthening their position with earth entrenchments."

At least until February 1862 troops remained. In October 1861 the 5th Kansas Volunteer Cavalry stayed at Camp Denver near Barnesville. In February the troops left.

George E. Flanders, in a letter home in February 1862 wrote that the men lived in tents during the winter and cleared out much timberland to use as firewood. He mentioned there was some guerrilla activity near camp.

For a time troops were absent at Barnesville, between about February 1862 and December 1863. At the latter date one or two companies of the 9th Kansas Volunteer Cavalry were stationed there. After February 1864 these troops were gone and the use of Barnesville's post ended.
