= Godfrey, Kansas =

- Unincorporated community
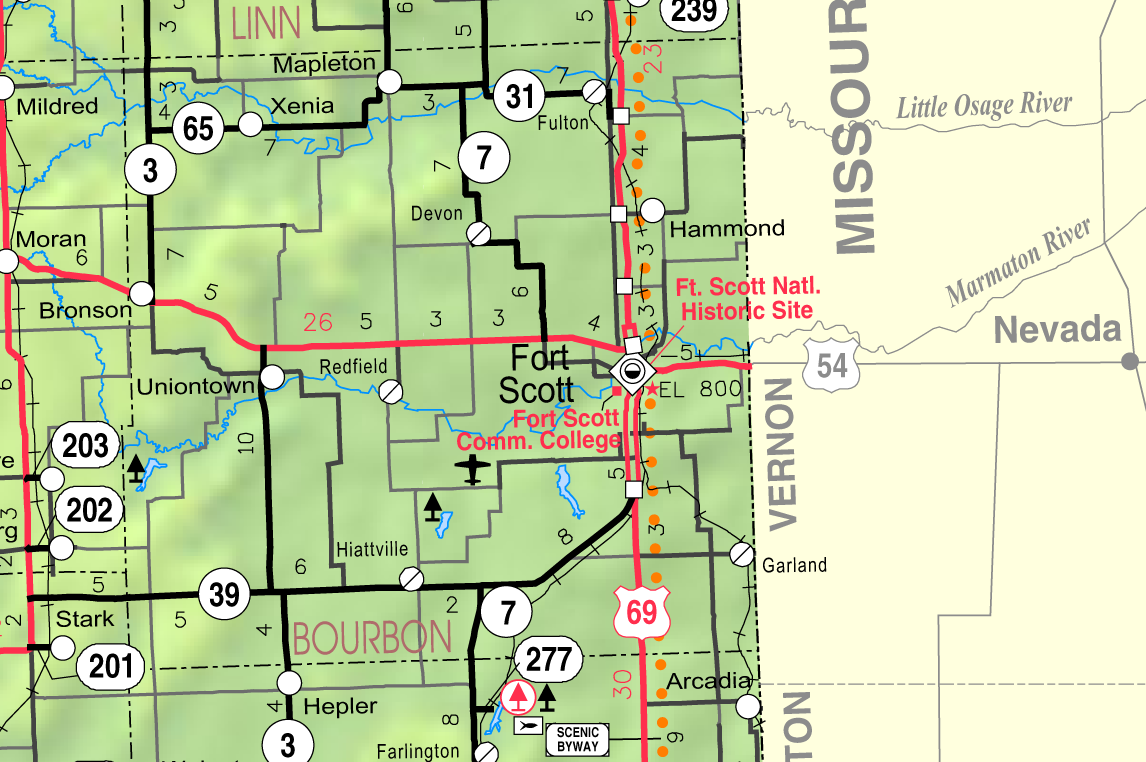
- KDOT map of Bourbon County (legend)
- Coordinates: 37°45′42″N 94°42′36″W
- Country: United States
- State: Kansas
- County: Bourbon
- Platted: 1871
- Elevation: 961 ft (293 m)
- Time zone: UTC-6 (CST)
  - Summer (DST): UTC-5 (CDT)
- Area code: 620
- FIPS code: 20-26735
- GNIS ID: 484699

Godfrey is an unincorporated community in Bourbon County, Kansas, United States.

== History ==
Godfrey was platted in 1871 as a coal mining community. Godfrey had a post office from 1870 until 1901.
