= Garland, Kansas =

- CDP
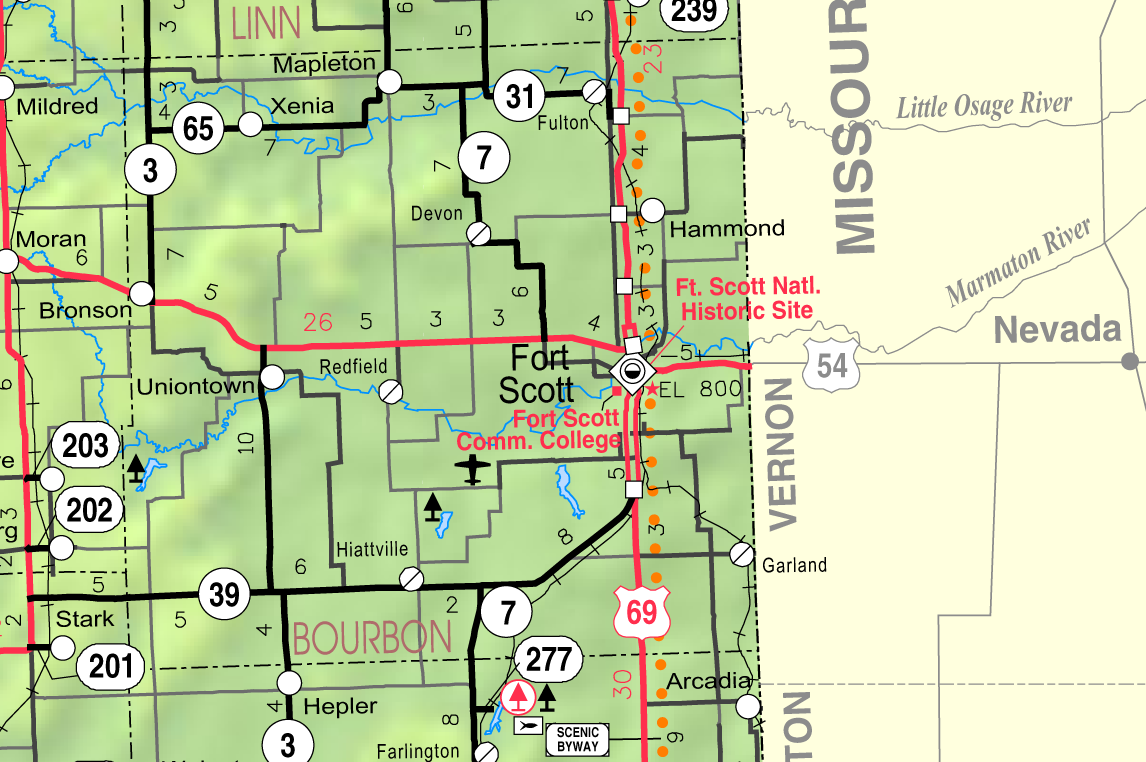
- KDOT map of Bourbon County (legend)
- Coordinates: 37°43′54″N 94°37′21″W
- Country: United States
- State: Kansas
- County: Bourbon
- Elevation: 869 ft (265 m)

Population (2020)
  - Total: 31
- Time zone: UTC-6 (CST)
  - Summer (DST): UTC-5 (CDT)
- ZIP Code: 66741
- Area code: 620
- FIPS code: 20-25900
- GNIS ID: 2804484

Garland is a census-designated place (CDP) in Bourbon County, Kansas, United States. As of the 2020 census, the population was 31. It is located along the Missouri state line 8.5 miles (13.7 km) southeast of Fort Scott.

== History ==
Garland was originally called Memphis. The name was changed to Garland (after a brand of stoves) when the railroad came through in the 1880s.

== Geography ==
Garland is located along the Missouri state line 8.5 miles (13.7 km) southeast of Fort Scott.

== Demographics ==
Historical population
| Census | Pop. | Note | %± |
|---|---|---|---|
| 2020 | 31 | | — |
U.S. Decennial Census

The 2020 United States census counted 31 people, 22 households, and 16 families in Garland. The population density was 144.9 per square mile (55.9/km^{2}). There were 22 housing units at an average density of 102.8 per square mile (39.7/km^{2}). The racial makeup was 93.55% (29) white or European American (93.55% non-Hispanic white), 0.0% (0) black or African-American, 0.0% (0) Native American or Alaska Native, 0.0% (0) Asian, 0.0% (0) Pacific Islander or Native Hawaiian, 0.0% (0) from other races, and 6.45% (2) from two or more races. Hispanic or Latino of any race was 0.0% (0) of the population.

Of the 22 households, 22.7% had children under the age of 18; 54.5% were married couples living together; 18.2% had a female householder with no spouse or partner present. 27.3% of households consisted of individuals and 9.1% had someone living alone who was 65 years of age or older. The average household size was 1.4 and the average family size was 2.0. The percent of those with a bachelor's degree or higher was estimated to be 0.0% of the population.

3.2% of the population was under the age of 18, 6.5% from 18 to 24, 19.4% from 25 to 44, 61.3% from 45 to 64, and 9.7% who were 65 years of age or older. The median age was 59.3 years. For every 100 females, there were 63.2 males. For every 100 females ages 18 and older, there were 57.9 males.

== Education ==
The community is served by Fort Scott USD 234 public school district.
