= Pawnee Township, Bourbon County, Kansas =

Pawnee Township
- Township
- Location in Bourbon County
- Coordinates: 37°43′05″N 094°50′01″W
- Country: United States
- State: Kansas
- County: Bourbon

Area
  - Total: 48.75 sq mi (126.27 km^{2})
  - Land: 48.60 sq mi (125.88 km^{2})
  - Water: 0.15 sq mi (0.39 km^{2}) 0.31%
- Elevation: 876 ft (267 m)

Population (2000)
  - Total: 308
  - Density: 6.2/sq mi (2.4/km^{2})
- GNIS feature ID: 0474756

Pawnee Township is a township in Bourbon County, Kansas, United States. As of the 2000 census, its population was 308.

== Geography ==
Pawnee Township covers an area of 48.75 square miles (126.3 km^{2}) and contains no incorporated settlements. According to the USGS, it contains two cemeteries: Hiattville and Saint Mary.

The stream of Little Pawnee Creek runs through this township.
