= Devon, Kansas =

- Unincorporated community
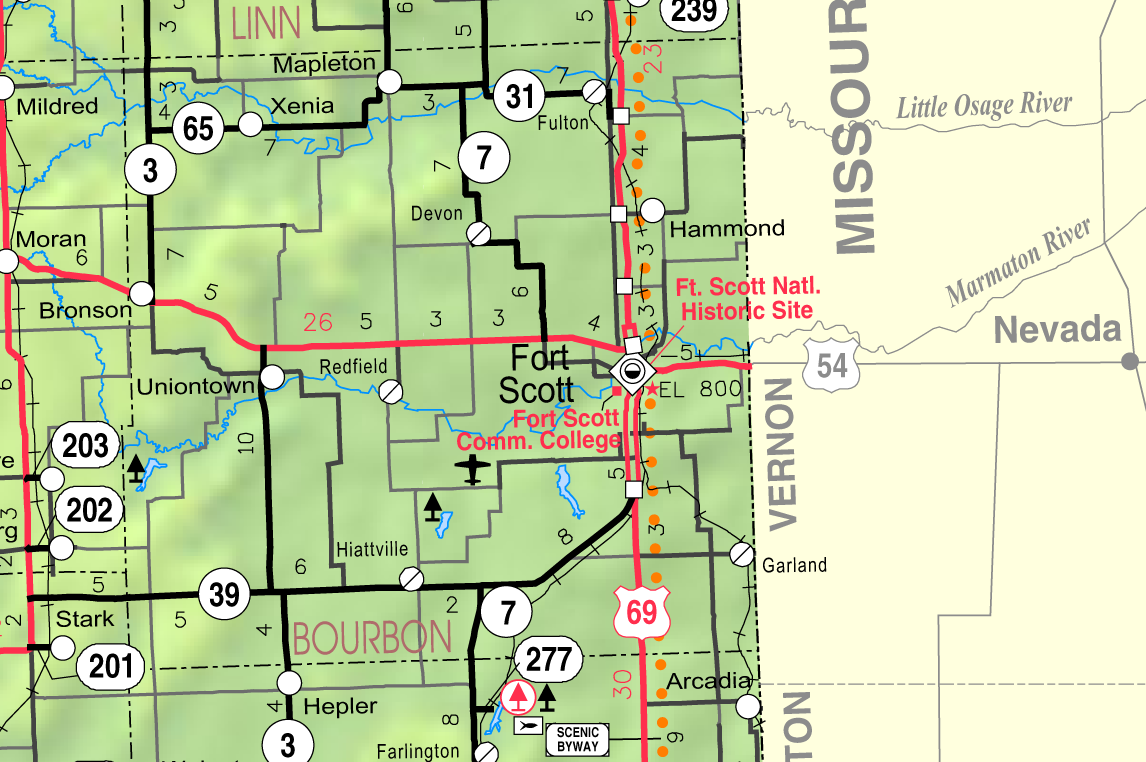
- KDOT map of Bourbon County (legend)
- Coordinates: 37°55′22″N 94°48′58″W
- Country: United States
- State: Kansas
- County: Bourbon
- Founded: 1860
- Elevation: 879 ft (268 m)

Population (2020)
  - Total: 71
- Time zone: UTC-6 (CST)
  - Summer (DST): UTC-5 (CDT)
- Area code: 620
- FIPS code: 20-17900
- GNIS ID: 2804482

Devon is a census-designated place (CDP) in Bourbon County, Kansas, United States. As of the 2020 census, the population was 71.

== History ==
Devon was originally called Mill Creek, and under the latter name was founded in 1860. The present name is after Devon, in England.

== Demographics ==
Historical population
Census	Pop.	Note	%±
2020	71		—
U.S. Decennial Census

== Education ==
The community is served by Fort Scott USD 234 public school district.
