= Sarah C. Hall =

American physician

Dr. Sarah C. Hall M.D.
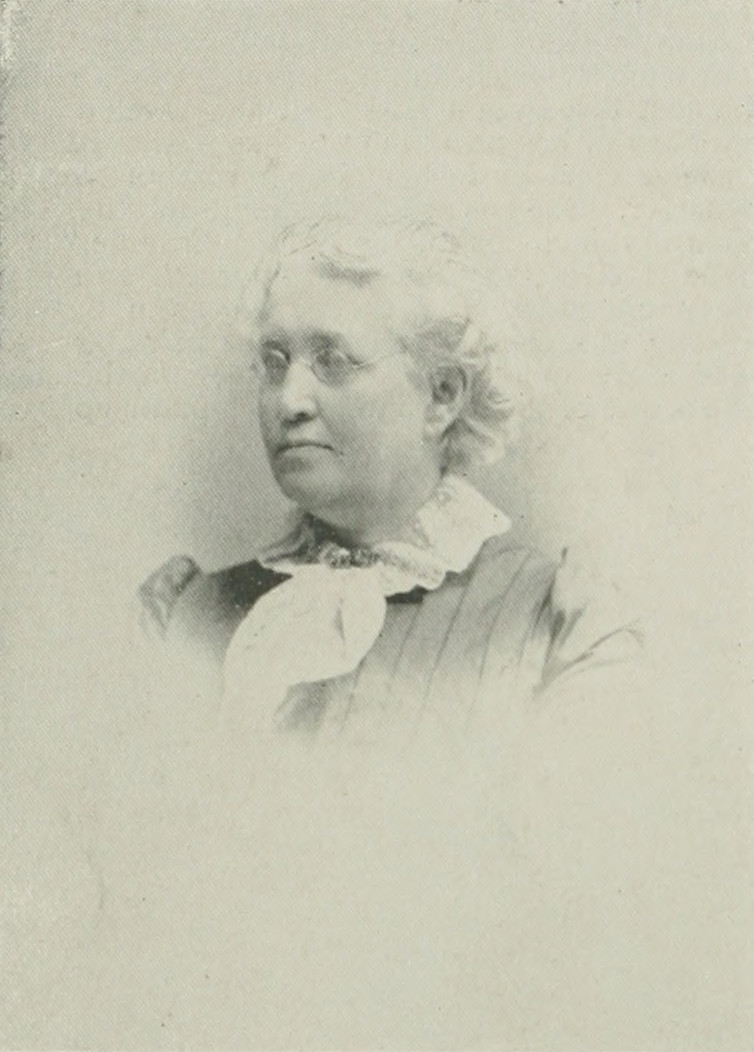
- Portrait photo from A Woman of the Century
- Born: Sarah C. Larkin; August 15, 1832; Madison County, New York, U.S.
- Died: May 30, 1926 (aged 93); Elgin, Illinois, U.S.
- Burial place: Evergreen cemetery, Fort Scott, Kansas, U.S.
- Education: Woman's Medical College of Pennsylvania
- Occupation: Physician
- Spouse: Earl J. Hall (m. 1853–1911)

Sarah C. Hall (1832–1926) was an American pioneer woman physician. She held leadership positions in various women's suffrage organizations. She was also associated with the Order of the Eastern Star, the Woman's Relief Corps (WRC), and the Daughters of the American Revolution (DAR).

== Early life and education ==
Sarah C. Larkin was born on a farm in Madison County, New York, on August 15, 1832. Her parents were of mixed English and Irish ancestry. She was collaterally related to Commodore Matthew C. Perry. Her family were Quakers, and she was educated in the society and wore its clothing style until she was a young woman.

== Career ==
=== Teacher ===
At sixteen, she began to teach school and board around, which she continued to do till her marriage to Earl J. Hall (died 1911) on October 12, 1853. The couple went west from Philadelphia on their wedding tour and stopped at Indianapolis, Indiana. Looking over that city, they liked it and located there, where they remained for 18 years. There, she took a prominent part in organized charity work. She also taught in city schools at times till she took up the study of medicine.

=== Medical school ===
Hall was inclined to study law. However, her family doctor, J. T. Boyd, urged Hall to consider the necessity for women physicians and offered his services as her preceptor. This decided her course of education, though, except for him, she received little encouragement in this choice. Her preparatory studies were made while caring for her two children, doing all her housework, and sewing.

In 1867, she entered the Woman's Medical College of Pennsylvania, from which she graduated in 1870. She was one of the class that, in November 1869, was insulted by the male students at the first Pennsylvania hospital clinic to which women were admitted, ignored by the lecturers, followed, and almost mobbed on the streets.

=== Kansas ===
On a trip to Kansas City, Kansas, Mr. Hall heard of the unprecedented growth of Fort Scott, Kansas. They moved to Fort Scott in the latter part of 1870. She was among the first regularly qualified women physicians to practice in Kansas. She eventually became a member of the County Medical Society, chiefly to give company to a young woman doctor who had just begun practice in the city and wished to join the society. Hall was also a member of the State Medical Society and the American Medical Association. She held the position of medical examiner for several insurance orders.

Although necessarily making her profession her chief task, Hall was a charter member of the Order of the Eastern Star and an active member of the WRC, holding high offices in both organizations. She was also a charter member of the Mollie Foster Berry Chapter of the DAR. The chapter was named for her ancestor, and the first regent was her daughter, Miss Frances Hall.

Hall had a strong interest in women's suffrage. She first understood the need for its public recognition when she received US$8 a month and board for teaching at the same school for which a man had the season before received US$24 a month and board, although the whole district declared her work to be better than his. Later and wider experience deepened her conviction. She attended many of the early suffrage conventions, both national and local. After moving to Kansas, she identified with suffrage work only in her city. During the campaign for municipal suffrage in 1886 and 1887, she became prominent in the State councils and seldom after that lost an opportunity to aid wherever possible. Several times, she served on the executive committee of the National Woman Suffrage Association and the National American Woman Suffrage Association, holding the position of Honorary Vice President for Kansas in the latter organization. She was also the President of the Bourbon County, Kansas Equal Suffrage Association.

She helped found the Unitarian Society at Fort Scott. In 1888, Hall was elected to serve a three-year term on the Fort Scott school board.

== Personal life and legacy ==
Hall was the mother of two children, Clarence and Frances. Widowed in 1911, Hall sold the family home and moved to Elgin, Illinois, with her daughter, Frances. Sarah C. Hall died in Elgin on May 30, 1926, at age 93. Burial was at the Evergreen Cemetery, Fort Scott.

The National Portrait Gallery holds an oil painting of Hall by H. W. Cuthbertson.
