= Hiattville, Kansas =

- Unincorporated community
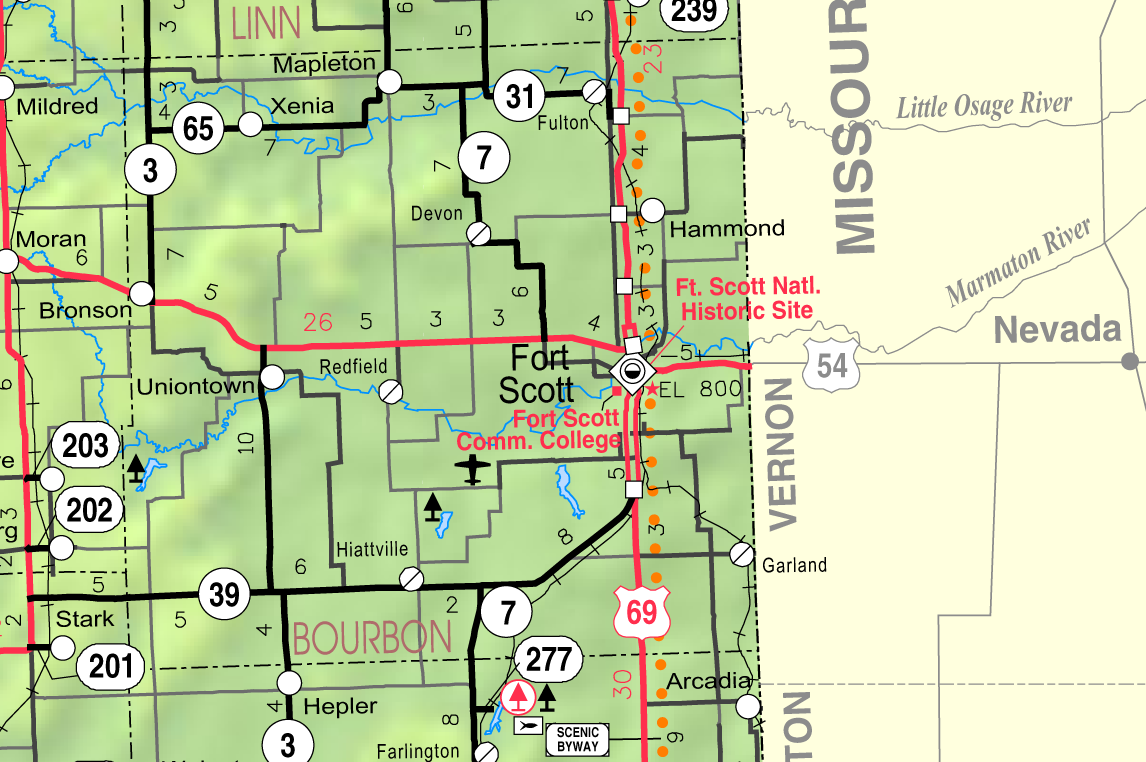
- KDOT map of Bourbon County (legend)
- Coordinates: 37°43′20″N 94°52′18″W
- Country: United States
- State: Kansas
- County: Bourbon
- Elevation: 997 ft (304 m)
- Time zone: UTC-6 (CST)
  - Summer (DST): UTC-5 (CDT)
- Area code: 620
- FIPS code: 20-31650
- GNIS ID: 474999

Hiattville is an unincorporated community in Bourbon County, Kansas, United States.

== History ==
A post office at Hiattville was established in 1870. It was first called Pawnee, but later renamed Hiattville in honor of James M. Hiatt, who owned the town site. The Sedalia branch Missouri-Kansas-Texas Railroad passed through Hiattville from the 1870s until the line was abandoned in 1988.

== Education ==
The community is served by Uniontown USD 235 public school district.
