= Porterville =

Porterville may refer to:

- Porterville, California
- Porterville, Kansas
- Porterville, Mississippi
- Porterville, Texas
- Porterville, Utah
- Porterville, Western Cape in South Africa
- "Porterville", a song by Creedence Clearwater Revival from their debut album Creedence Clearwater Revival
