= Ben Glusing =

American politician (1916–2016)

Member of the Texas House of Representatives
- In office January 13, 1953 – January 8, 1963

Personal details
- Born: February 3, 1916 Redfield, Kansas, U.S.
- Died: May 3, 2016 (aged 100) Kingsville, Texas, U.S.
- Party: Democratic
- Spouse: Nell Buchanan Jack
- Children: James Jack "Jim" Glusing
- Education: Washburn College

Benjamin Albert Glusing (February 3, 1916 – May 3, 2016) was an American politician. He served as a Democratic member in the Texas House of Representatives from 1953 to 1963.
