= Mill Creek Township, Bourbon County, Kansas =

Mill Creek Township
- Township
- Location in Bourbon County
- Coordinates: 37°54′23″N 094°49′24″W
- Country: United States
- State: Kansas
- County: Bourbon

Area
  - Total: 52.64 sq mi (136.33 km^{2})
  - Land: 52.42 sq mi (135.76 km^{2})
  - Water: 0.22 sq mi (0.57 km^{2}) 0.42%
- Elevation: 850 ft (260 m)

Population (2000)
  - Total: 472
  - Density: 9.1/sq mi (3.5/km^{2})
- GNIS feature ID: 0474565

Mill Creek Township is a township in Bourbon County, Kansas, United States. As of the 2000 census, its population was 472.

== Geography ==
Mill Creek Township covers an area of 52.64 square miles (136.3 km^{2}) and contains no incorporated settlements. According to the USGS, it contains two cemeteries: Centerville and West Plains.

The streams of Honey Creek and Little Mill Creek run through this township.
