= Fulton, Kansas =

- City
- Location within Bourbon County and Kansas

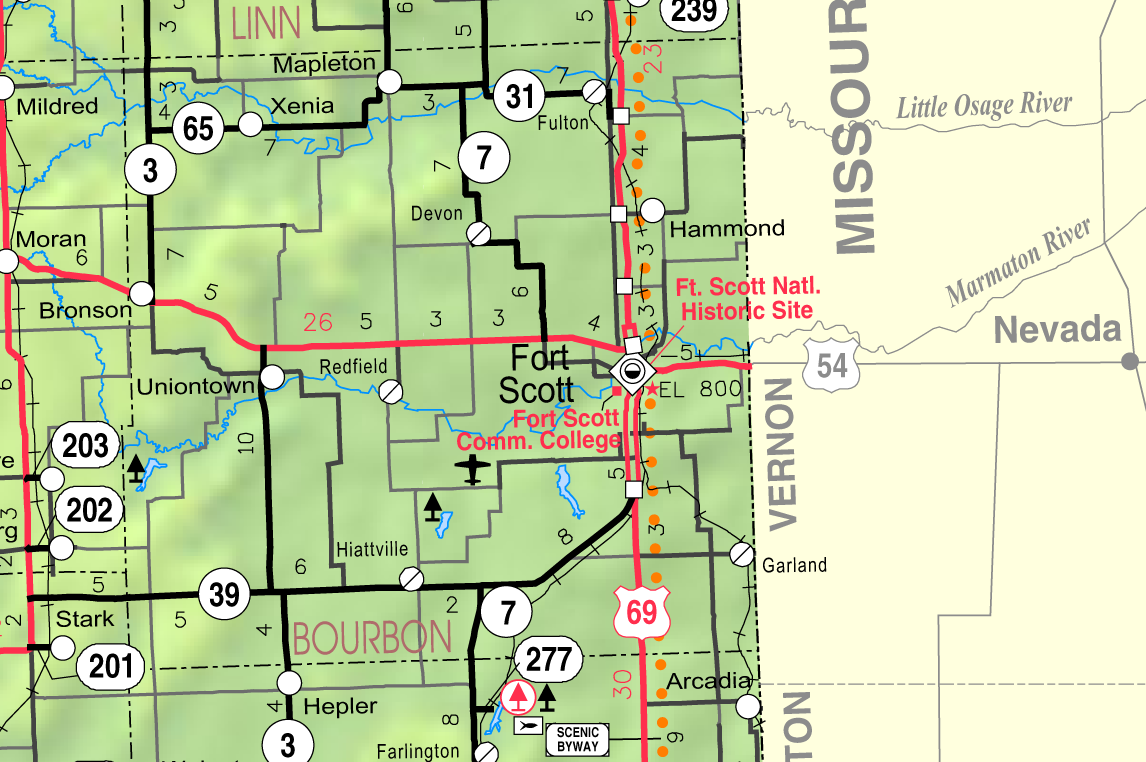
- KDOT map of Bourbon County (legend)
- Coordinates: 38°0′35″N 94°43′11″W
- Country: United States
- State: Kansas
- County: Bourbon
- Founded: 1869
- Incorporated: 1884
- Named for: Fulton, Illinois

Area
  - Total: 0.19 sq mi (0.50 km^{2})
  - Land: 0.19 sq mi (0.50 km^{2})
  - Water: 0 sq mi (0.00 km^{2})
- Elevation: 846 ft (258 m)

Population (2020)
  - Total: 165
  - Density: 850/sq mi (330/km^{2})
- Time zone: UTC-6 (CST)
  - Summer (DST): UTC-5 (CDT)
- ZIP Code: 66738
- Area code: 620
- FIPS code: 20-24925
- GNIS ID: 2394835
- Website: fultonkansas.com

Fulton is a city in Bourbon County, Kansas, United States. As of the 2020 census, the population of the city was 165.

== History ==
Fulton was originally known as Osaga, and under the latter name was founded in 1869. It was renamed to Fulton in 1878, after the city of Fulton, Illinois.

A post office was first established under the name Osaga in 1869.

== Geography ==
Fulton is located along the Little Osage River.

According to the United States Census Bureau, the city has a total area of 0.19 square miles (0.49 km^{2}), all land.

== Demographics ==
Historical population
Census	Pop.	Note	%±
1880	263		—
1890	506		92.4%
1900	424		−16.2%
1910	416		−1.9%
1920	411		−1.2%
1930	393		−4.4%
1940	309		−21.4%
1950	243		−21.4%
1960	207		−14.8%
1970	213		2.9%
1980	194		−8.9%
1990	191		−1.5%
2000	184		−3.7%
2010	163		−11.4%
2020	165		1.2%
U.S. Decennial Census

=== 2020 census ===
The 2020 United States census counted 165 people, 51 households, and 32 families in Fulton. The population density was 859.4 per square mile (331.8/km^{2}). There were 68 housing units at an average density of 354.2 per square mile (136.7/km^{2}). The racial makeup was 79.39% (131) white or European American (75.76% non-Hispanic white), 1.21% (2) black or African-American, 0.61% (1) Native American or Alaska Native, 0.0% (0) Asian, 0.0% (0) Pacific Islander or Native Hawaiian, 4.85% (8) from other races, and 13.94% (23) from two or more races. Hispanic or Latino of any race was 12.12% (20) of the population.

Of the 51 households, 23.5% had children under the age of 18; 43.1% were married couples living together; 27.5% had a female householder with no spouse or partner present. 23.5% of households consisted of individuals and 13.7% had someone living alone who was 65 years of age or older. The average household size was 2.8 and the average family size was 3.2. The percent of those with a bachelor's degree or higher was estimated to be 4.8% of the population.

32.1% of the population was under the age of 18, 8.5% from 18 to 24, 25.5% from 25 to 44, 21.2% from 45 to 64, and 12.7% who were 65 years of age or older. The median age was 33.5 years. For every 100 females, there were 98.8 males. For every 100 females ages 18 and older, there were 107.4 males.

The 2016–2020 5-year American Community Survey estimates show that the median household income was $46,250 (with a margin of error of +/- $9,665) and the median family income was $48,750 (+/- $20,199). Males had a median income of $37,813 (+/- $8,963) versus $31,250 (+/- $12,787) for females. The median income for those above 16 years old was $34,792 (+/- $6,482). Approximately, 0.0% of families and 2.7% of the population were below the poverty line, including 0.0% of those under the age of 18 and 0.0% of those ages 65 or over.

=== 2010 census ===
As of the census of 2010, there were 163 people, 63 households, and 45 families residing in the city. The population density was 857.9 inhabitants per square mile (331.2/km^{2}). There were 84 housing units at an average density of 442.1 per square mile (170.7/km^{2}). The racial makeup of the city was 90.2% White, 0.6% African American, 3.7% Native American, 1.2% from other races, and 4.3% from two or more races. Hispanic or Latino of any race were 5.5% of the population.

There were 63 households, of which 34.9% had children under the age of 18 living with them, 49.2% were married couples living together, 9.5% had a female householder with no husband present, 12.7% had a male householder with no wife present, and 28.6% were non-families. 23.8% of all households were made up of individuals, and 9.5% had someone living alone who was 65 years of age or older. The average household size was 2.59 and the average family size was 3.07.

The median age in the city was 40.5 years. 22.7% of residents were under the age of 18; 12.8% were between the ages of 18 and 24; 19% were from 25 to 44; 31.2% were from 45 to 64; and 14.1% were 65 years of age or older. The gender makeup of the city was 50.9% male and 49.1% female.

=== 2000 census ===
As of the census of 2000, there were 184 people, 71 households, and 47 families residing in the city. The population density was 975.4 inhabitants per square mile (376.6/km^{2}). There were 87 housing units at an average density of 461.2 per square mile (178.1/km^{2}). The racial makeup of the city was 94.57% White, 3.26% Native American, 0.54% Asian, and 1.63% from two or more races. Hispanic or Latino of any race were 0.54% of the population.

There were 71 households, out of which 32.4% had children under the age of 18 living with them, 52.1% were married couples living together, 8.5% had a female householder with no husband present, and 32.4% were non-families. 28.2% of all households were made up of individuals, and 14.1% had someone living alone who was 65 years of age or older. The average household size was 2.59 and the average family size was 3.08.

In the city, the population was spread out, with 28.8% under the age of 18, 8.2% from 18 to 24, 27.7% from 25 to 44, 22.8% from 45 to 64, and 12.5% who were 65 years of age or older. The median age was 38 years. For every 100 females, there were 104.4 males. For every 100 females age 18 and over, there were 92.6 males.

The median income for a household in the city was $26,094, and the median income for a family was $41,071. Males had a median income of $29,375 versus $25,000 for females. The per capita income for the city was $15,070. About 14.6% of families and 11.8% of the population were below the poverty line, including none of those under the age of eighteen and 16.7% of those 65 or over.

== Education ==
The community is served by Fort Scott USD 234 public school district. It previously operated Fulton High School before that closed.
