= Fort Scott USD 234 =

Public school district in Fort Scott, Kansas

Address
- 424 S. Main Street Fort Scott, Kansas, 66701; United States
- Coordinates: 37.83696°N 94.70651°W

District information
- Type: Public
- Grades: PreK to 12
- Schools: 5

Other information
- Website: usd234.org

Fort Scott USD 234 is a public unified school district headquartered in Fort Scott, Kansas, United States. The district includes the communities of Fort Scott, Fulton, Devon, Garland, Hammond, Pawnee Station, and nearby rural areas.

== Schools ==
The school district operates the following schools:

- Fort Scott High School
- Fort Scott Middle School
- Eugene Ware Elementary School
- Winfield Scott Elementary School
- Fort Scott Preschool Center

== See also ==
- Kansas State Department of Education
- Kansas State High School Activities Association
- List of high schools in Kansas
- List of unified school districts in Kansas
