= Berlin, Georgia =

City in Georgia, United States

- Town
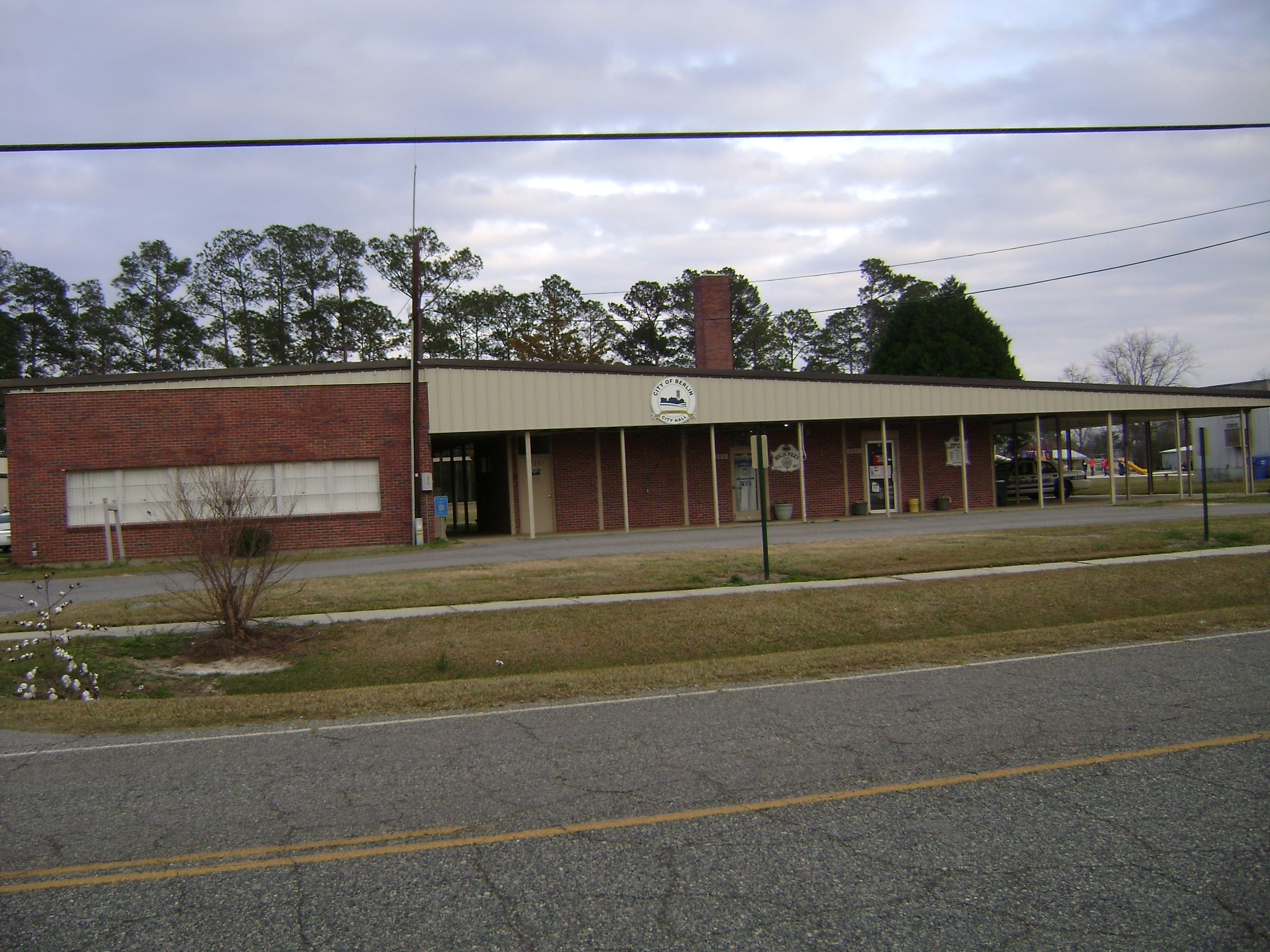
- Berlin City Hall

- Seal

- Location in Colquitt County and the state of Georgia
- Coordinates: 31°4′3″N 83°37′25″W
- Country: United States
- State: Georgia
- County: Colquitt

Government
  - Mayor: Scott Merritt

Area
  - Total: 0.83 sq mi (2.16 km^{2})
  - Land: 0.83 sq mi (2.16 km^{2})
  - Water: 0 sq mi (0.00 km^{2})
- Elevation: 259 ft (79 m)

Population (2020)
  - Total: 511
  - Density: 611.6/sq mi (236.13/km^{2})
- Time zone: UTC-5 (Eastern (EST))
  - Summer (DST): UTC-4 (EDT)
- ZIP code: 31722
- Area code: 229
- FIPS code: 13-07304
- GNIS feature ID: 0354554
- Website: cityofberlinga.com

Berlin is a city in Colquitt County, Georgia, United States. As of the 2020 census, the city had a population of 511.

== History ==
Berlin was incorporated as a town in 1910. A post office has been in operation at Berlin since 1910. The community was named after Berlin, in Germany. Upon American entry into World War I, the town was renamed "Lens" due to Anti-German sentiment. The name "Berlin" was soon afterwards restored.

== Geography ==
Berlin is located at 31°4′3″N 83°37′25″W (31.067405, -83.623649).

According to the United States Census Bureau, the town has a total area of 0.8 square miles (2.1 km^{2}), all land.

=== Climate ===
Climate data for Berlin, GA
Month	Jan	Feb	Mar	Apr	May	Jun	Jul	Aug	Sep	Oct	Nov	Dec	Year
Mean daily maximum °F (°C)	62.0 (16.7)	66.0 (18.9)	73.0 (22.8)	79.0 (26.1)	86.0 (30.0)	90.0 (32.2)	92.0 (33.3)	91.0 (32.8)	87.0 (30.6)	80.0 (26.7)	70.0 (21.1)	64.0 (17.8)	78.3 (25.8)
Mean daily minimum °F (°C)	39.0 (3.9)	42.0 (5.6)	48.0 (8.9)	54.0 (12.2)	62.0 (16.7)	68.0 (20.0)	71.0 (21.7)	71.0 (21.7)	67.0 (19.4)	57.0 (13.9)	47.0 (8.3)	42.0 (5.6)	55.7 (13.2)
Source: NOAA

== Demographics ==
Historical population
Census	Pop.	Note	%±
1930	250		—
1940	322		28.8%
1950	309		−4.0%
1960	419		35.6%
1970	422		0.7%
1980	538		27.5%
1990	480		−10.8%
2000	595		24.0%
2010	551		−7.4%
2020	511		−7.3%
U.S. Decennial Census; 1850-1870 1870-1880; 1890-1910 1920-1930; 1940 1950 1960; 1970 1980 1990; 2000 2010

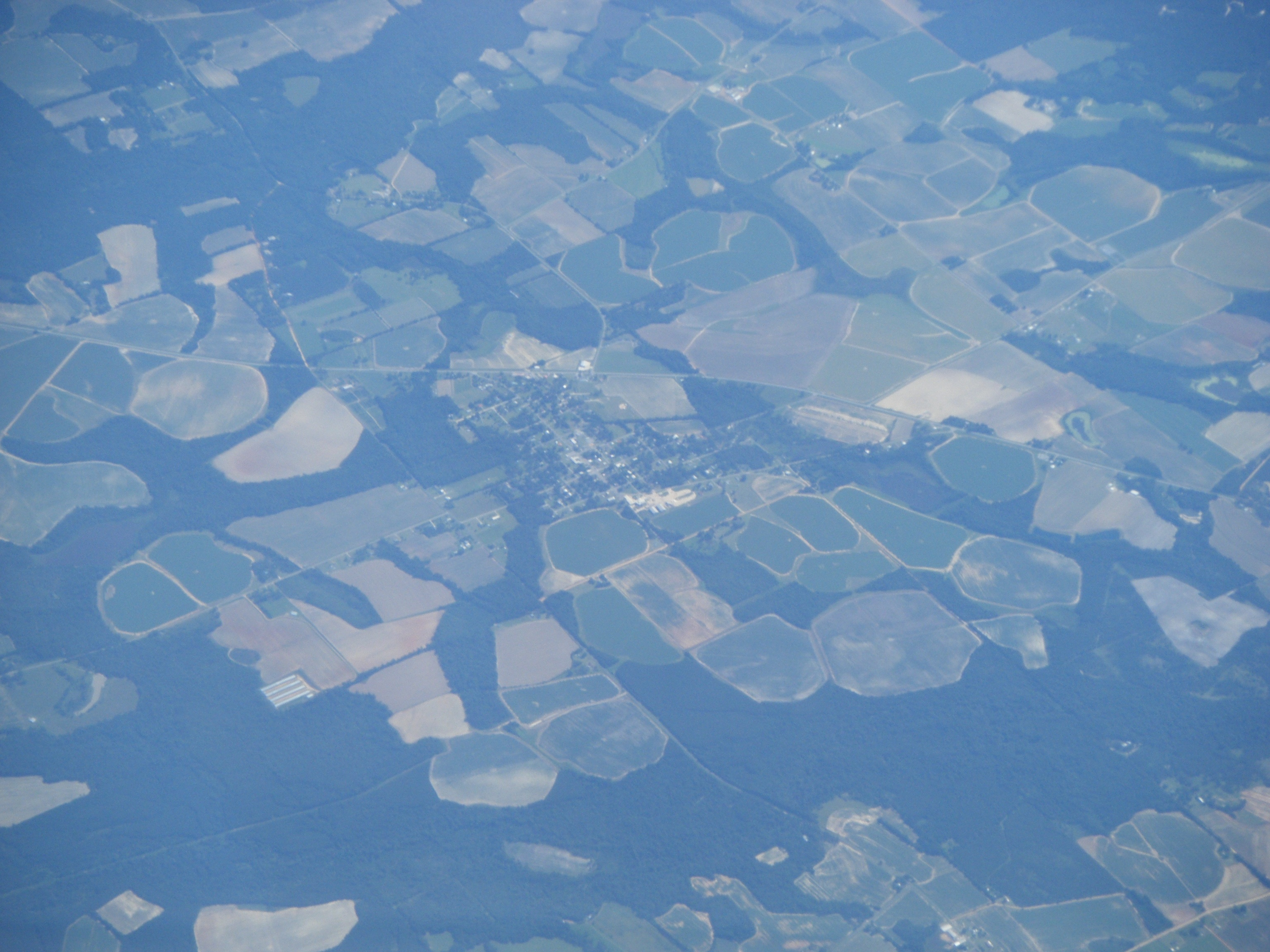
Aerial view of Berlin and surrounding countryside

As of the census of 2000, there were 595 people, 196 households, and 145 families residing in the town. In 2020, there were 511 people residing in the town.
