= Barnesville, Kansas =

- Unincorporated community
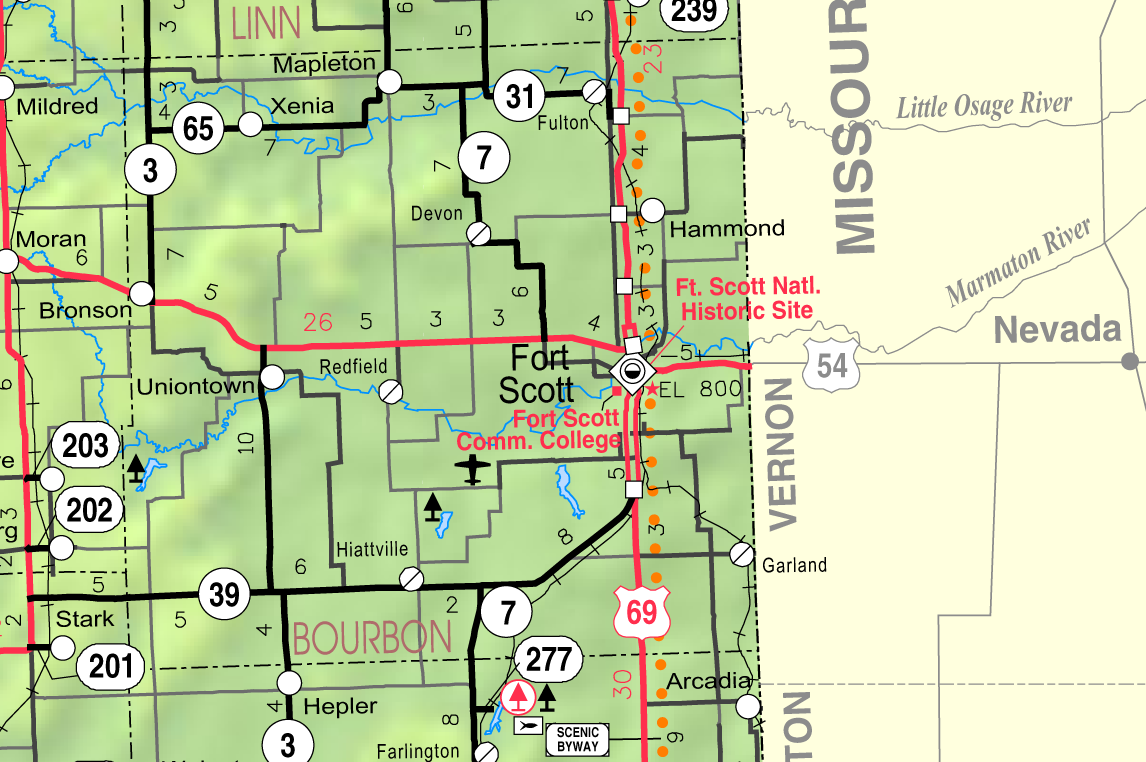
- KDOT map of Bourbon County (legend)
- Coordinates: 38°00′55″N 94°39′41″W
- Country: United States
- State: Kansas
- County: Bourbon
- Platted: 1858
- Elevation: 860 ft (260 m)
- Time zone: UTC-6 (CST)
  - Summer (DST): UTC-5 (CDT)
- Area code: 620
- FIPS code: 20-04300
- GNIS ID: 484842

Barnesville is an unincorporated community in Bourbon County, Kansas, United States.

== History ==
Barnesville was platted in 1858 by J. and F. Barnes, and named for them. A post office was established at Barnesville in 1856, and remained in operation until it was discontinued in 1906. A Civil War era military post, Barnesville's Post, is located in the area.
