= First Presbyterian Church (Fort Scott, Kansas) =

Historic church in Kansas, United States

- U.S. National Register of Historic Places
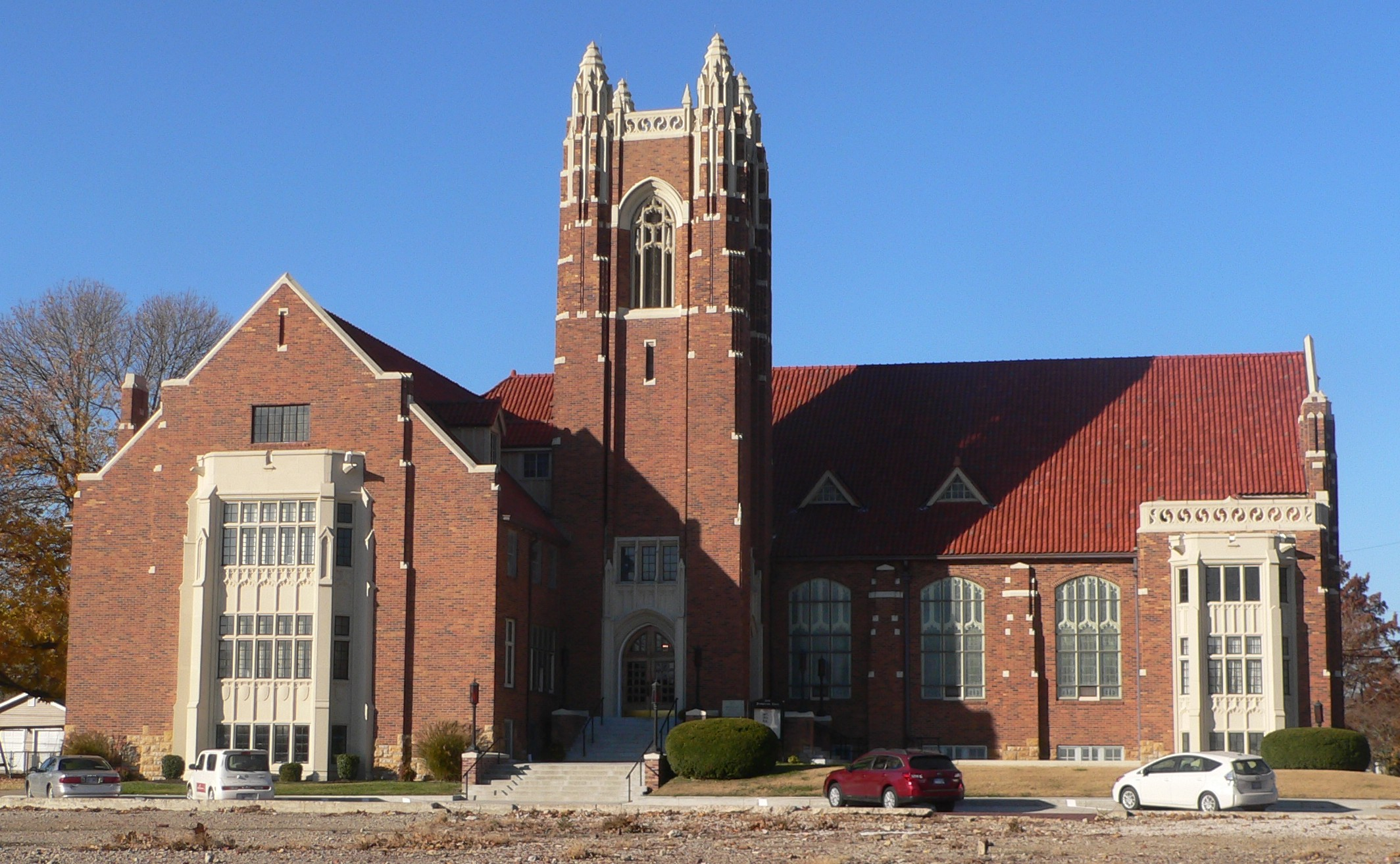

- Location within Kansas Location within the United States
- Location: 308 S. Crawford, Fort Scott, Kansas
- Coordinates: 37.838481°N 94.710028°W
- Built: 1925
- Architect: Bostrom, Ernest Olaf
- Architectural style: Collegiate Gothic, Late Gothic Revival
- NRHP reference No.: 08000619
- Added to NRHP: July 2, 2008

The First Presbyterian Church in Fort Scott, Kansas, at 308 S. Crawford, was built in 1925. It was added to the National Register of Historic Places in 2008.

It is an L-shaped three-and-a-half-story brick and limestone building. It was designed by Kansas City, Missouri architect Ernest Olaf Brostrom. It was deemed notable as "an excellent example of Collegiate Gothic-style architecture."
