= Camp Drywood =

US Army post in Kansas

Camp Drywood was established by the US Army in fall 1862. It was located about fifteen miles south of Fort Scott, Kansas. It was intended to serve as a military post guarding against Confederate guerrillas in the area. However, it ended up being the temporary home to 2,000 Cherokee and Creek Indians from Indian Territory who were loyal to the Union.

The Indians lacked adequate food and clothing. The area superintendent of Indian affairs, William G. Coffin, attempted to persuade the Indians to move to the Sac and Fox reserve, along the Kansas-Nebraska border. They refused and Brig. Gen. James G. Blunt began to unilaterally move the Indians back to Indian Territory in March 1863.

Coffin helped provide the Indians with food, clothing, seeds and farming implements, so they could provide for themselves better once moved back. The move was completed in April 1863 and Camp Drywood soon passed out of existence.
