= Twomile Creek (Nepco Lake tributary) =

Stream in Wisconsin, US

Coordinates: 44°21′03″N 89°50′34″W

Twomile Creek is a stream in the US state of Wisconsin. It is a tributary to Nepco Lake.

Twomile Creek was so named for its distance, two miles (3.2 km) from the original Grand Rapids townsite.
