= Marmaton River =

River in Kansas and Missouri, U.S.

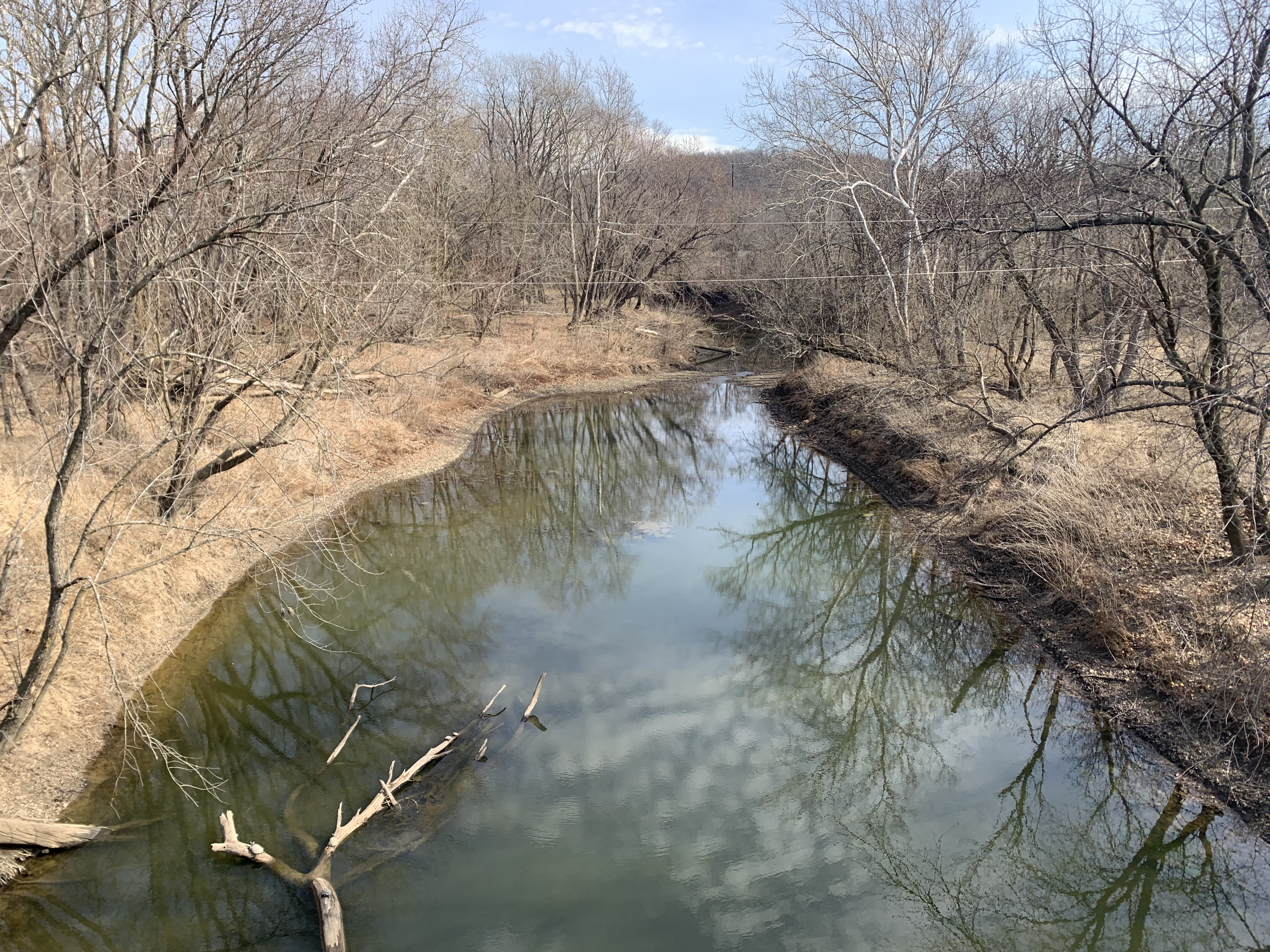
- Marmaton River at Kansas Highway 3 south of Uniontown, Kansas

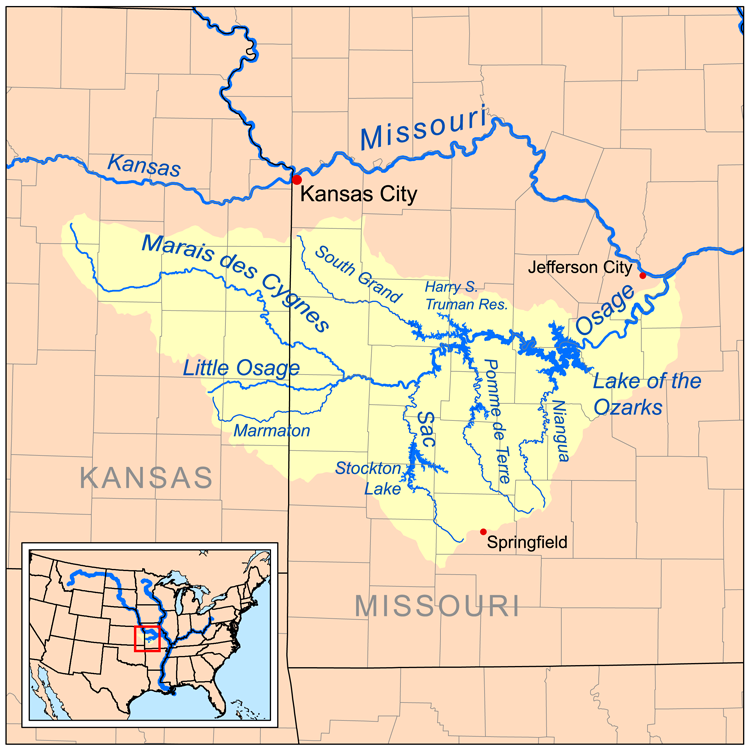
- Map of the Osage River watershed including the Marmaton River

Location
- Country: United States
- State: Kansas, Missouri

Physical characteristics
- Source
  - location: Allen County, Kansas
  - coordinates: 37°56′45″N 95°07′51″W
  - elevation: 1,105 ft (337 m)
- Mouth: Little Osage River
  - location: Vernon County, Missouri
  - coordinates: 37°59′57″N 94°19′08″W
  - elevation: 732 ft (223 m)
- Length: 102 mi (164 km)
- Discharge
  - location: USGS 06918060 near Nevada, MO
  - average: 1,051 cu ft/s (29.8 m^{3}/s)
  - minimum: 0.03 cu ft/s (0.00085 m^{3}/s)
  - maximum: 33,800 cu ft/s (960 m^{3}/s)

Basin features
- Tributaries
  - left: Twomile Creek
  - right: Chambers Branch, Dry Wood Creek, Old Town Branch
- Watersheds: Marmaton-Little Osage-Osage-Missouri-Mississippi

The Marmaton River (MAR-muh-tuhn) is a 102-mile-long (164 km) tributary of the Little Osage River in southeastern Kansas and western Missouri in the United States. Via the Little Osage, Osage and Missouri rivers, it is part of the watershed of the Mississippi River.

== Course ==
The Marmaton River rises in Kansas northeast of Moran in eastern Allen County and flows generally eastward through Bourbon County in Kansas and Vernon County in Missouri, past the towns of Uniontown, Redfield and Fort Scott in Kansas and Deerfield in Missouri. It joins the Little Osage River from the south, 7 miles (11 km) south-southeast of Rich Hill, Missouri.

== Name ==
Marmaton is a corruption of Marmiton, a French name given by fur traders meaning "scullion".

== See also ==
- List of Kansas rivers
- List of Missouri rivers
- Battle of Marmiton River
