= Two Mile Creek (Yellow River tributary) =

Stream in Wisconsin, U.S.

Coordinates: 44°20′52″N 90°06′57″W

Two Mile Creek is a stream in the U.S. state of Wisconsin. It is a tributary to the Yellow River.

Two Mile Creek was named from its distance, two miles (3.2 km) from Dexterville.
