= Pawnee Creek (Kansas) =

Stream in the US state of Kansas

Coordinates: 37°47′28″N 94°49′27″W

Pawnee Creek is a stream in Bourbon and Crawford counties, in the U.S. state of Kansas. It is a tributary via Paint Creek of the Marmaton River, which in turn flows east to the Little Osage River, the Osage River, the Missouri River, and ultimately the Mississippi River.

Pawnee Creek was named after the Pawnee people.

== See also ==
- List of rivers of Kansas
