= Twomile Creek (North Fork Salt River tributary) =

River in Missouri, United States of America

Coordinates: 39.994760°N 92.292407°W

Twomile Creek (also called Two Mile Branch) is a stream in Knox and Macon Counties in the U.S. state of Missouri. It is a tributary of the North Fork Salt River.

Twomile Creek is about two miles from Locust Hill, which may account for the name.

== See also ==
- List of rivers of Missouri
