= Uniontown High School (Kansas) =

Secondary school in Kansas, United States

Location
- 601 E. 5th Street; Uniontown, Kansas 66779; United States; 37.8493°N 94.9722°W

Information
- School type: Public, High School
- School district: Uniontown USD 235
- CEEB code: 172980
- NCES School ID: 201245000150
- Teaching staff: 16.20 (on an FTE basis)
- Grades: 7–12
- Gender: coed
- Enrollment: 189 (2023–2024)
- Student to teacher ratio: 11.67
- Campus type: Rural
- Colors: Black and Orange
- Mascot: Eagle

Uniontown High School is the public high school in Uniontown, Kansas, United States. It is operated by Uniontown USD 235 public school district and located at 601 E. 5th St. The school mascot is an eagle, and the school colors are black and orange.

== History ==
The Uniontown High School marching band was selected to perform in President Ronald Reagan's Inaugural Parade on January 21, 1985.

== See also ==
- List of high schools in Kansas
- List of unified school districts in Kansas
