= Porterville, Kansas =

- Unincorporated community
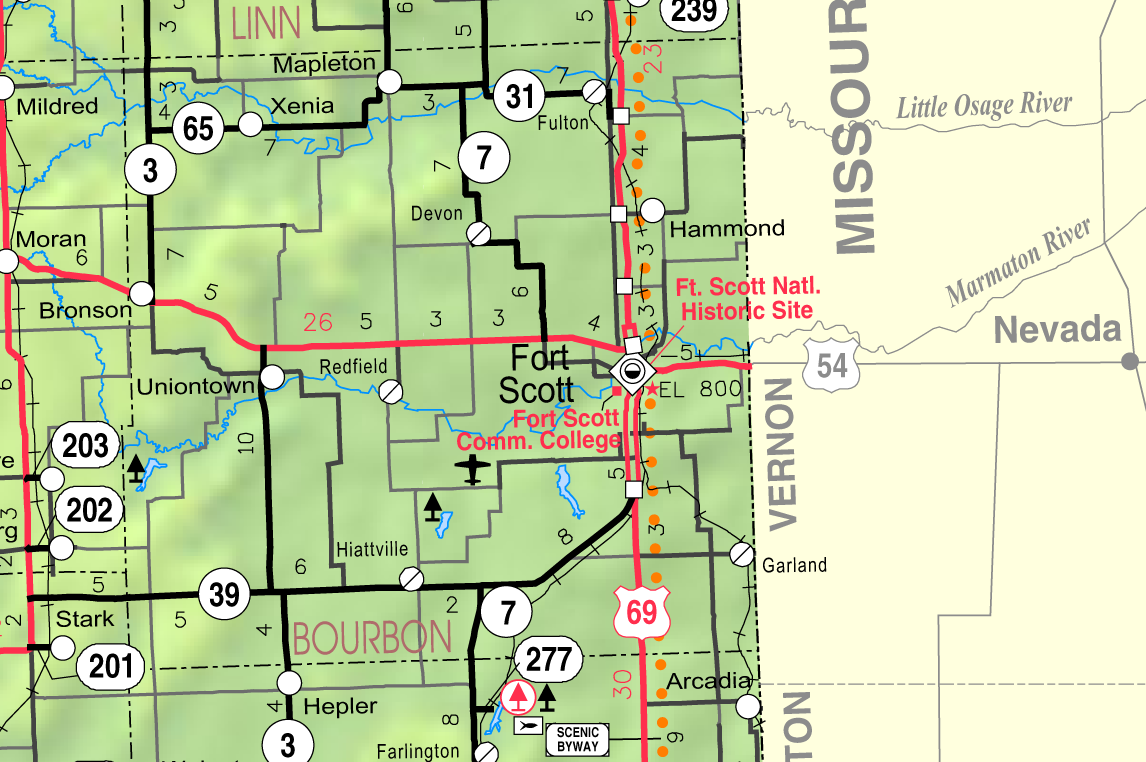
- KDOT map of Bourbon County (legend)
- Coordinates: 37°43′05″N 95°04′08″W
- Country: United States
- State: Kansas
- County: Bourbon
- Elevation: 1,011 ft (308 m)
- Time zone: UTC-6 (CST)
  - Summer (DST): UTC-5 (CDT)
- Area code: 620
- FIPS code: 20-57075
- GNIS ID: 484706

Porterville is an unincorporated community in Bourbon County, Kansas, United States.

== History ==
Porterville had a post office from 1882 until 1905. L. G. Porter, the first postmaster, gave the community its name.
