= Twomile Creek (Warm Fork Spring River tributary) =

Stream in the American state of Missouri

Twomile Creek is a stream in Oregon County in the Ozarks of southern Missouri, United States. It is a tributary of the Warm Fork Spring River.

The stream headwaters are at 36°34′38″N 91°37′13″W and the confluence with the Warm Fork Spring River is at 36°31′25″N 91°32′11″W. The stream source area lies about 1.5 miles southeast of Koshkonong and the stream flows southeast roughly paralleling U.S. Route 63 until entering the Warm Fork Spring River in east Thayer.

Twomile Creek was named due to the presumed length.

== See also ==
- List of rivers of Missouri
