= Twomile Creek (Chattahoochee River tributary) =

Watercourse in the US

Coordinates: 34°14′3.36″N 83°59′9.66″W

Twomile Creek is a stream in the U.S. state of Georgia. It is a tributary to the Chattahoochee River.

Twomile Creek was so named on account of its distance, two miles (3.2 km) from the Middle Cherokee Trading Path. Sometimes the name is spelled out "Two Mile Creek".
