= Twomile Creek (Marmaton River tributary) =

Stream in Vernon County, Missouri, U.S.

Coordinates: 37.856983°N 94.464675°W

Twomile Creek is a stream in Vernon County in the U.S. state of Missouri. It is a tributary of the Marmaton River.

Twomile Creek, historically called "Two Mile Branch", was so named on account of its length, approximately 2 miles (3.2 km).

== See also ==
- List of rivers of Missouri
