= Drywood Township, Kansas =

Drywood Township
- Township
- Location in Bourbon County
- Coordinates: 37°43′00″N 094°41′11″W
- Country: United States
- State: Kansas
- County: Bourbon

Area
  - Total: 46.59 sq mi (120.67 km^{2})
  - Land: 46.50 sq mi (120.44 km^{2})
  - Water: 0.089 sq mi (0.23 km^{2}) 0.19%
- Elevation: 922 ft (281 m)

Population (2000)
  - Total: 394
  - Density: 8.5/sq mi (3.3/km^{2})
- GNIS feature ID: 0474803

Drywood Township is a township in Bourbon County, Kansas, United States. As of the 2000 census, its population was 394.

== Geography ==
Drywood Township covers an area of 46.59 square miles (120.7 km^{2}) and contains no incorporated settlements. According to the USGS, it contains five cemeteries: Howard, Mayfield, Pine Lawn, Pleasant View and Tweedy.

The streams of Cox Creek and Walnut Creek run through this township.
