= Barnesville, North Carolina =

- Unincorporated community
- Location within North Carolina Location within the United States
- Coordinates: 34°24′32″N 79°02′48″W
- Country: United States
- State: North Carolina
- County: Robeson
- Elevation: 102 ft (31 m)
- Time zone: UTC-5 (Eastern (EST))
  - Summer (DST): UTC-4 (EDT)
- ZIP code: 28319
- Area codes: 910, 472
- GNIS feature ID: 980574

Barnesville is an unincorporated community in Robeson County, North Carolina, United States. The community is 7.2 miles (11.6 km) south-southeast of Fairmont. Barnesville had a post office from May 15, 1879, to September 11, 2010; it still has its own ZIP code, 28319.

The community was founded in 1888 and named after Richard Rhodes Barnes who provided land for a railway through the community.
