= Uniontown USD 235 =

Public school district in Uniontown, Kansas

Coordinates: 37.8493°N 94.9721°W

Address
- 601 5th St. Uniontown, Kansas, 66779; United States

District information
- Type: Public
- Grades: PreK to 12

Students and staff
- Students: 475

Other information
- Website: uniontown235.org

Uniontown USD 235 is a public unified school district headquartered in Uniontown, Kansas, United States. The district includes the communities of Uniontown, Bronson, Hiattville, Mapleton, Redfield, and nearby rural areas.

== Schools ==
The school district operates the following schools:

- Uniontown High School
- Uniontown Junior High School
- West Bourbon Elementary School

== See also ==
- Kansas State Department of Education
- Kansas State High School Activities Association
- List of high schools in Kansas
- List of unified school districts in Kansas
