= Uniontown, Kansas =

- City
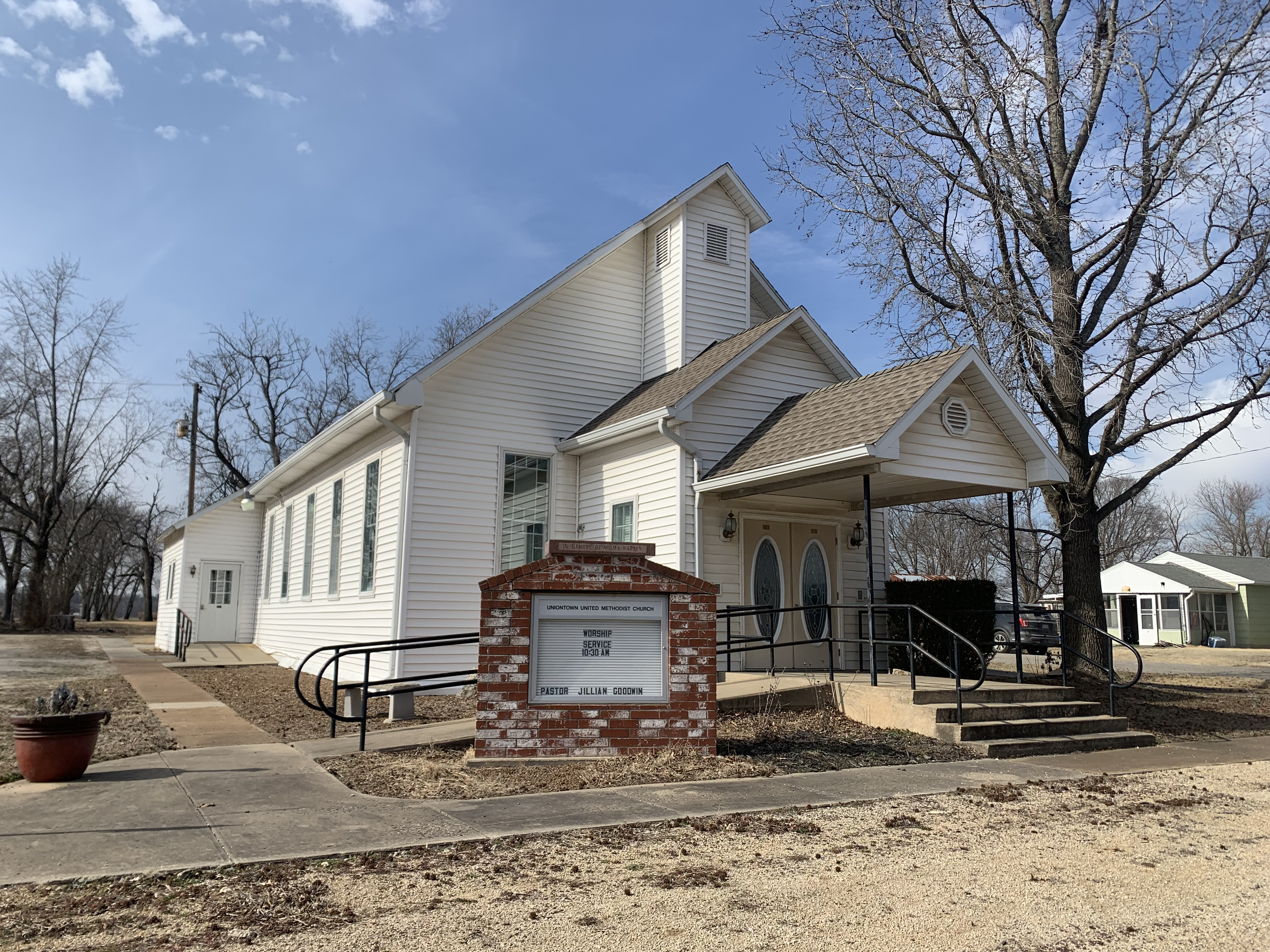
- Uniontown United Methodist Church (2026)

- Location within Bourbon County and Kansas

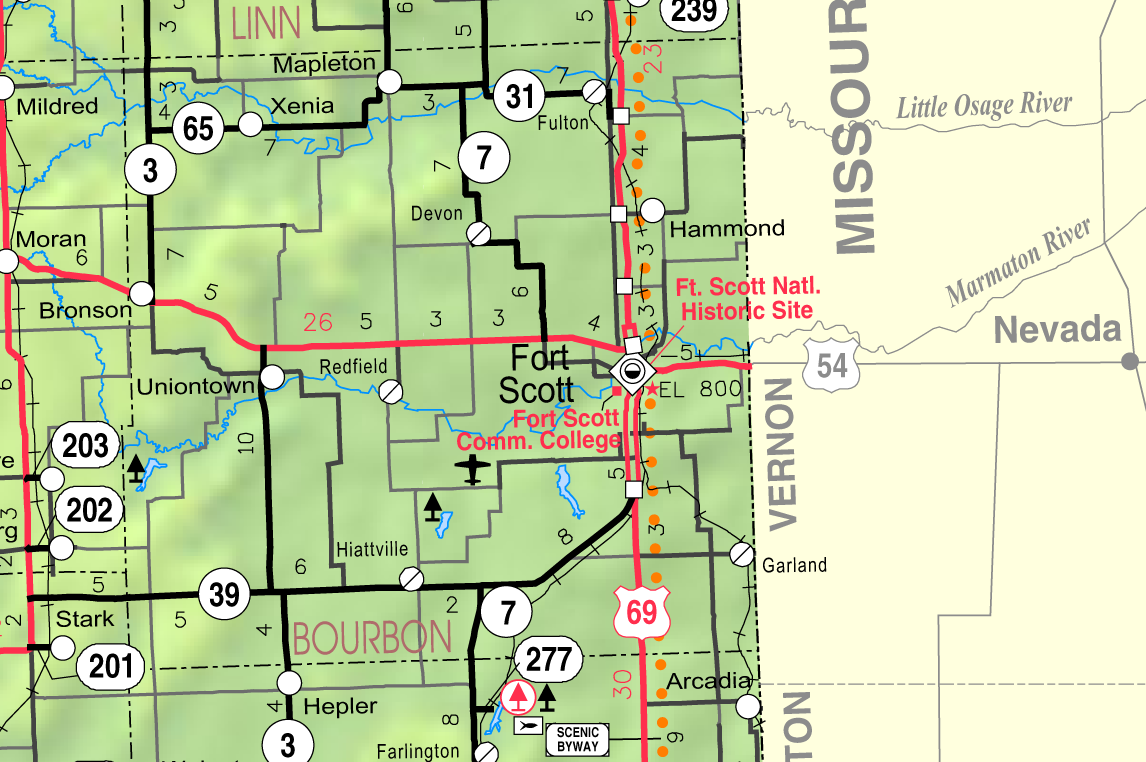
- KDOT map of Bourbon County (legend)
- Coordinates: 37°50′50″N 94°58′32″W
- Country: United States
- State: Kansas
- County: Bourbon
- Incorporated: 1895
- Named for: Union

Area
  - Total: 0.21 sq mi (0.55 km^{2})
  - Land: 0.21 sq mi (0.55 km^{2})
  - Water: 0 sq mi (0.00 km^{2})
- Elevation: 889 ft (271 m)

Population (2020)
  - Total: 293
  - Density: 1,400/sq mi (530/km^{2})
- Time zone: UTC-6 (CST)
  - Summer (DST): UTC-5 (CDT)
- ZIP Code: 66779
- Area code: 620
- FIPS code: 20-72525
- GNIS ID: 2397088
- Website: cityofuniontown.net

Uniontown is a city in Bourbon County, Kansas, United States. As of the 2020 census, the population of the city was 293.

== History ==
A post office was established in 1856, approximately two miles east of the present town. Uniontown was moved to its present site circa 1865. The early settlers being loyal to the Union in the Civil War caused the name to be selected. Throughout the twentieth century, the town was served by the Missouri Pacific Railroad.

== Geography ==
Uniontown is located along the Marmaton River.

According to the United States Census Bureau, the city has a total area of 0.22 square miles (0.57 km^{2}), all land.

=== Climate ===
The climate in this area is characterized by hot, humid summers and generally mild to cool winters. According to the Köppen Climate Classification system, Uniontown has a humid subtropical climate, abbreviated "Cfa" on climate maps.

== Demographics ==
Historical population
Census	Pop.	Note	%±
1880	136		—
1890	344		152.9%
1900	293		−14.8%
1910	256		−12.6%
1920	300		17.2%
1930	298		−0.7%
1940	277		−7.0%
1950	232		−16.2%
1960	211		−9.1%
1970	286		35.5%
1980	371		29.7%
1990	290		−21.8%
2000	288		−0.7%
2010	272		−5.6%
2020	293		7.7%
U.S. Decennial Census

=== 2010 census ===
As of the census of 2010, there were 272 people, 120 households, and 66 families residing in the city. The population density was 1,236.4 inhabitants per square mile (477.4/km^{2}). There were 142 housing units at an average density of 645.5 per square mile (249.2/km^{2}). The racial makeup of the city was 96.0% White, 0.7% African American, 0.7% Native American, 0.4% Asian, 0.7% from other races, and 1.5% from two or more races. Hispanic or Latino of any race were 0.7% of the population.

There were 120 households, of which 30.0% had children under the age of 18 living with them, 39.2% were married couples living together, 10.0% had a female householder with no husband present, 5.8% had a male householder with no wife present, and 45.0% were non-families. 45.0% of all households were made up of individuals, and 22.5% had someone living alone who was 65 years of age or older. The average household size was 2.27 and the average family size was 3.20.

The median age in the city was 37.4 years. 27.2% of residents were under the age of 18; 7% were between the ages of 18 and 24; 22.8% were from 25 to 44; 25.8% were from 45 to 64; and 17.3% were 65 years of age or older. The gender makeup of the city was 45.2% male and 54.8% female.

=== 2000 census ===
As of the census of 2000, there were 288 people, 120 households, and 72 families residing in the city. The population density was 1,337.6 inhabitants per square mile (516.5/km^{2}). There were 138 housing units at an average density of 640.9 per square mile (247.5/km^{2}). The racial makeup of the city was 97.22% White, 0.35% African American, 1.04% Native American, 0.35% from other races, and 1.04% from two or more races. Hispanic or Latino of any race were 1.39% of the population.

There were 120 households, out of which 28.3% had children under the age of 18 living with them, 46.7% were married couples living together, 10.8% had a female householder with no husband present, and 40.0% were non-families. 38.3% of all households were made up of individuals, and 22.5% had someone living alone who was 65 years of age or older. The average household size was 2.24 and the average family size was 2.97.

In the city, the population was spread out, with 24.7% under the age of 18, 9.4% from 18 to 24, 16.3% from 25 to 44, 22.2% from 45 to 64, and 27.4% who were 65 years of age or older. The median age was 45 years. For every 100 females, there were 85.8 males. For every 100 females age 18 and over, there were 82.4 males.

The median income for a household in the city was $25,417, and the median income for a family was $33,229. Males had a median income of $21,667 versus $19,464 for females. The per capita income for the city was $13,283. About 12.3% of families and 14.1% of the population were below the poverty line, including 14.5% of those under the age of eighteen and 9.7% of those 65 or over.

== Education ==
The community is served by Uniontown USD 235 public school district.

In 1999, four students at the local high school started the Life in a Jar project honoring Irena Sendler, a Polish humanitarian who rescued over 2500 Jewish children from the Warsaw Ghetto during World War II. The project spread internationally and brought fame to a little-known story of heroism.
