= Redfield, Kansas =

- City
- Location within Bourbon County and Kansas

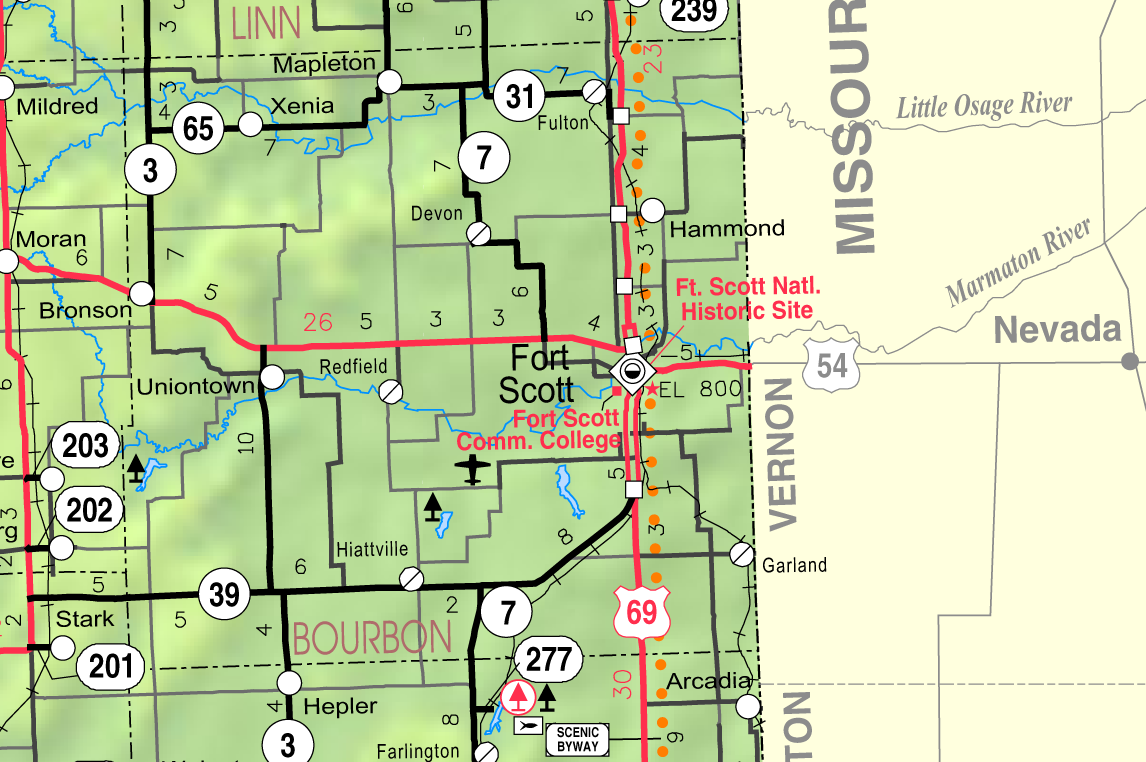
- KDOT map of Bourbon County (legend)
- Coordinates: 37°50′12″N 94°52′55″W
- Country: United States
- State: Kansas
- County: Bourbon
- Founded: 1866
- Incorporated: 1905
- Named for: Dr. Redfield

Area
  - Total: 0.14 sq mi (0.37 km^{2})
  - Land: 0.14 sq mi (0.37 km^{2})
  - Water: 0 sq mi (0.00 km^{2})
- Elevation: 860 ft (260 m)

Population (2020)
  - Total: 90
  - Density: 630/sq mi (240/km^{2})
- Time zone: UTC-6 (CST)
  - Summer (DST): UTC-5 (CDT)
- ZIP Code: 66769
- Area code: 620
- FIPS code: 20-58725
- GNIS ID: 2396341

Redfield is a city in Bourbon County, Kansas, United States. As of the 2020 census, the population of the city was 90.

== History ==
Redfield was founded in 1866. The city was named for Dr. Redfield, an early settler. The first post office in Redfield was established in 1872. Throughout the twentieth century the town was served by the Missouri Pacific Railroad.

== Geography ==
Redfield is located along the Marmaton River.

According to the United States Census Bureau, the city has a total area of 0.12 square miles (0.31 km^{2}), all land.

=== Climate ===
The climate in this area is characterized by hot, humid summers and generally mild to cool winters. According to the Köppen Climate Classification system, Redfield has a humid subtropical climate, abbreviated "Cfa" on climate maps.

== Demographics ==
Historical population
Census	Pop.	Note	%±
1890	162		—
1910	232		—
1920	269		15.9%
1930	233		−13.4%
1940	194		−16.7%
1950	173		−10.8%
1960	133		−23.1%
1970	138		3.8%
1980	185		34.1%
1990	143		−22.7%
2000	140		−2.1%
2010	146		4.3%
2020	90		−38.4%
U.S. Decennial Census

=== 2010 census ===
As of the census of 2010, there were 146 people, 53 households, and 33 families residing in the city. The population density was 1,216.7 inhabitants per square mile (469.8/km^{2}). There were 59 housing units at an average density of 491.7 per square mile (189.8/km^{2}). The racial makeup of the city was 91.8% White, 2.1% African American, 2.7% Native American, and 3.4% from two or more races. Hispanic or Latino of any race were 4.1% of the population.

There were 53 households, of which 35.8% had children under the age of 18 living with them, 39.6% were married couples living together, 13.2% had a female householder with no husband present, 9.4% had a male householder with no wife present, and 37.7% were non-families. 35.8% of all households were made up of individuals, and 18.8% had someone living alone who was 65 years of age or older. The average household size was 2.75 and the average family size was 3.55.

The median age in the city was 29.5 years. 32.9% of residents were under the age of 18; 9.6% were between the ages of 18 and 24; 20.6% were from 25 to 44; 22.6% were from 45 to 64; and 14.4% were 65 years of age or older. The gender makeup of the city was 43.8% male and 56.2% female.

=== 2000 census ===
As of the census of 2000, there were 140 people, 55 households, and 37 families residing in the city. The population density was 988.2 inhabitants per square mile (381.5/km^{2}). There were 59 housing units at an average density of 416.4 per square mile (160.8/km^{2}). The racial makeup of the city was 95.00% White, 1.43% Native American, and 3.57% from two or more races. Hispanic or Latino of any race were 3.57% of the population.

There were 55 households, out of which 34.5% had children under the age of 18 living with them, 52.7% were married couples living together, 9.1% had a female householder with no husband present, and 32.7% were non-families. 27.3% of all households were made up of individuals, and 9.1% had someone living alone who was 65 years of age or older. The average household size was 2.55 and the average family size was 3.11.

In the city, the population was spread out, with 30.7% under the age of 18, 5.7% from 18 to 24, 27.9% from 25 to 44, 27.9% from 45 to 64, and 7.9% who were 65 years of age or older. The median age was 35 years. For every 100 females, there were 105.9 males. For every 100 females age 18 and over, there were 86.5 males.

The median income for a household in the city was $23,333, and the median income for a family was $28,750. Males had a median income of $22,188 versus $13,594 for females. The per capita income for the city was $10,351. There were 40.5% of families and 36.7% of the population living below the poverty line, including 52.0% of under eighteens and 28.6% of those over 64.

== Education ==
The community is served by Uniontown USD 235 public school district.

== Notable people ==
- Richard Christy, drummer for Death, radio personality on The Howard Stern Show.
- Ben Glusing, member of the Texas House of Representatives from 1953 to 1963.
- Elmer McCollum, biochemist who co-discovered Vitamin A.
