= Bourbon County, Kansas =

County in Kansas, United States

- County
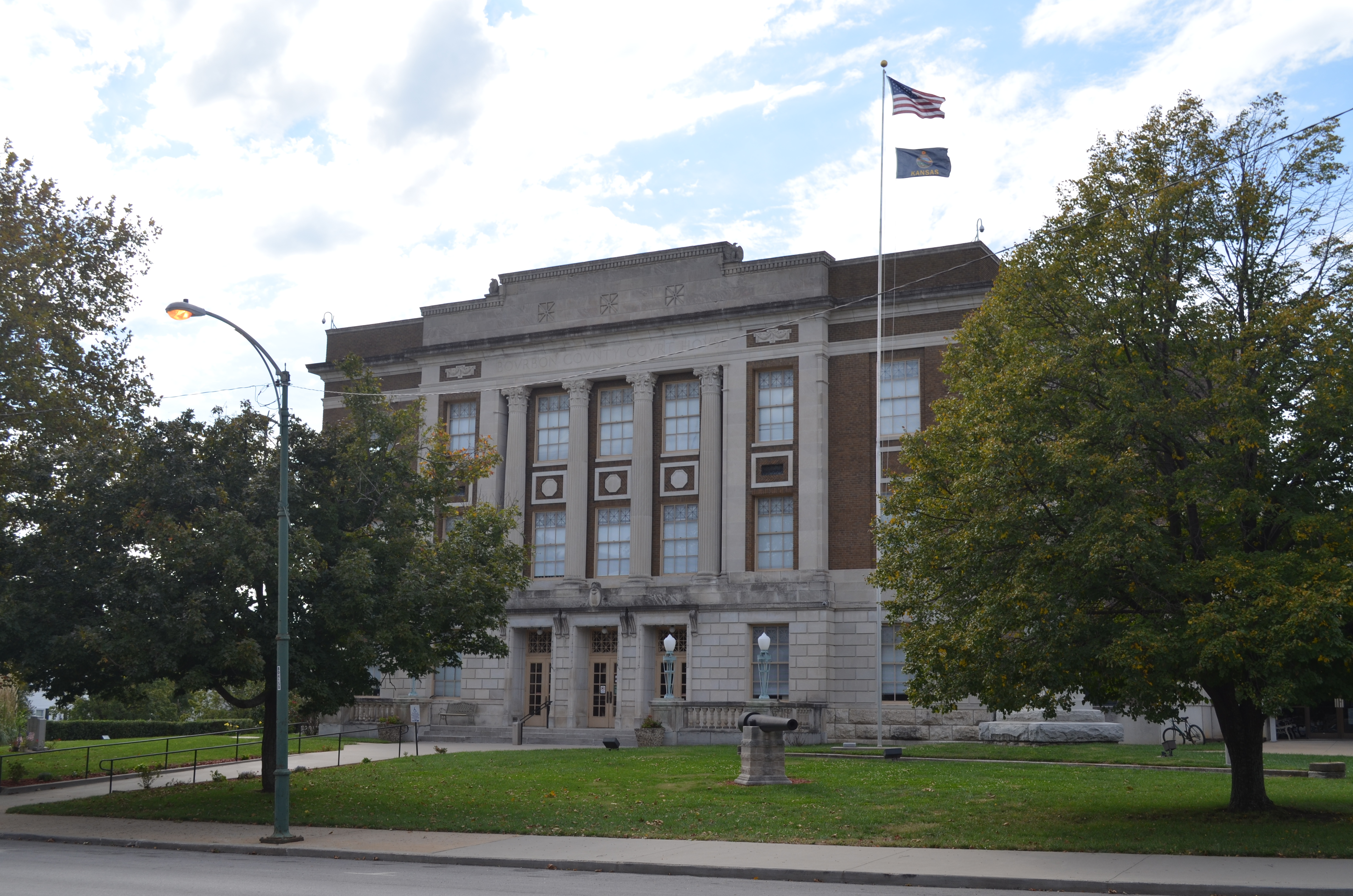
- Bourbon County Courthouse in Fort Scott (2016)

- Location within the U.S. state of Kansas
- Country: United States
- State: Kansas
- Founded: August 25, 1855
- Named for: Bourbon County, Kentucky
- Seat: Fort Scott
- Largest city: Fort Scott

Area
  - Total: 639 sq mi (1,660 km^{2})
  - Land: 635 sq mi (1,640 km^{2})
  - Water: 3.6 sq mi (9.3 km^{2}) 0.6%

Population (2020)
  - Total: 14,360
  - Estimate (2025): 14,319 ▼
  - Density: 22.6/sq mi (8.73/km^{2})
- Time zone: UTC−6 (Central)
  - Summer (DST): UTC−5 (CDT)
- Area code: 620
- Congressional district: 2nd
- Website: BourbonCountyKS.org

Bourbon County is a county located in Southeast Kansas. Its county seat and most populous city is Fort Scott. As of the 2020 census, the county population was 14,360. The county was named after Bourbon County, Kentucky, the former home of many early settlers.

== History ==
=== Early history ===
In 1855, Bourbon County was established and named after Bourbon County, Kentucky, due to the significant number of settlers from that region. Its early history is tied to the establishment of Fort Scott in 1842 to manage relations with Indian tribes in the region, in particular with the Osage. The county's first settlers, many of whom were proslavery, faced opposition from free-state advocates, leading to violent confrontations during the Bleeding Kansas era and later during the Civil War, such the Battle of Mine Creek in 1864.

The aftermath of the Civil War brought economic and demographic changes; many ex-soldiers settled in the area, contributing to its agricultural growth. Postwar years saw the railroad's arrival, connecting Bourbon County to broader markets and facilitating the expansion of coalmining and agriculture, particularly wheat, corn, and later, grain sorghum.

=== 21st century ===
Bourbon virus, a new strain of thogotovirus, was first discovered in Bourbon County. In the spring of 2014, an otherwise healthy man was bitten by a tick, contracting the virus and dying 11 days later from organ failure.

== Geography ==
According to the U.S. Census Bureau, the county has a total area of 639 square miles (1,660 km^{2}), of which 3.6 sq mi (9.3 km^{2}) (0.6%) are covered by water.

=== Adjacent counties ===
- Linn County (north)
- Vernon County, Missouri (east)
- Crawford County (south)
- Neosho County (southwest)
- Allen County (west)
- Anderson County (northwest)

=== National protected area ===
- Fort Scott National Historic Site

=== Major highways ===
Sources: National Atlas, U.S. Census Bureau

- U.S. Route 54
- U.S. Route 69
- Kansas Highway 3
- Kansas Highway 7
- Kansas Highway 31
- Kansas Highway 39
- Kansas Highway 65

== Demographics ==
Historical population
Census	Pop.	Note	%±
1860	6,101		—
1870	15,076		147.1%
1880	19,591		29.9%
1890	28,575		45.9%
1900	24,712		−13.5%
1910	24,007		−2.9%
1920	23,198		−3.4%
1930	22,386		−3.5%
1940	20,944		−6.4%
1950	19,153		−8.6%
1960	16,090		−16.0%
1970	15,215		−5.4%
1980	15,969		5.0%
1990	14,966		−6.3%
2000	15,379		2.8%
2010	15,173		−1.3%
2020	14,360		−5.4%
2025 (est.)	14,319	▼	−0.3%
U.S. Decennial Census; 1790–1960 1900–1990; 1990–2000 2010–2020

=== 2020 census ===
As of the 2020 census, the county had a population of 14,360. The median age was 38.6 years; 25.5% of residents were under 18 and 19.8% were 65 or older. For every 100 females, there were 98.7 males, and for every 100 females 18 and over, there were 96.3 males 18 and over. About 51.8% of residents lived in urban areas, while 48.2% lived in rural areas.

The racial makeup of the county was 87.6% White, 3.3% Black or African American, 0.7% American Indian and Alaska Native, 0.7% Asian, 0.0% Native Hawaiian and Pacific Islander, 1.0% from some other race, and 6.7% from two or more races. Hispanic or Latino residents of any race comprised 2.7% of the population.

Of the 5,666 households in the county, 31.2% had children under18 living with them, 25.7% had a female householder with no spouse or partner present, 28.8% were made up of individuals, and 14.2% had someone living alone who was 65 or older.

The county had 6,770 housing units, of which 16.3% were vacant. Among occupied housing units, 69.4% were owner-occupied and 30.6% were renter-occupied. The homeowner vacancy rate was 2.5% and the rental vacancy rate was 11.3%.

=== 2000 census ===
As of the 2000 census, 15,379 people, 6,161 households, and 4,127 families resided in the county. The population density was 24 people per square mile (9.3 people/km^{2}). The 7,135 housing units had an average density of 11 per square mile (4.2/km^{2}). The racial makeup of the county was 94.06% White, 3.08% Black or African American, 0.84% Native American, 0.36% Asian, 0.05% Pacific Islander, 0.28% from other races, and 1.33% from two or more races. Hispanics or Latinos of any race were 1.29% of the population.

Of the 6,161 households, 30.5% had children under 18 living with them, 54.5% were married couples living together, 9.2% had a female householder with no husband present, and 33.0% were not families. About 29.0% of all households were made up of individuals, and 14.9% had someone living alone who was 65 or older. The average household size was 2.44 and the average family size was 3.01.

In the county, the age distribution was 25.8% under 18, 9.5% from 18 to 24, 24.2% from 25 to 44, 22.3% from 45 to 64, and 18.2% who were 65 or older. The median age was 38 years. For every 100 females, there were 93.00 males. For every 100 females 18 and over, there were 88.50 males.

The median income in the county for a household was $31,199 and for a family was $39,239. Males had a median income of $27,043 versus $20,983 for females. The per capita income for the county was $16,393. About 9.5% of families and 13.5% of the population were below the poverty line, including 18.0% of those under 18 and 13.4% of those 65 or over.

== Government ==
=== Presidential elections ===
Bourbon County is a strongly Republican county. Only six presidential elections from 1888 to the present have resulted in Republicans failing to win the county, with the last of these being in 1964.

Presidential election results

United States presidential election results for Bourbon County, Kansas
Year	Republican		Democratic		Third party(ies)	
Year	No.	%	No.	%	No.	%
1888	3,569	57.07%	1,831	29.28%	854	13.66%
1892	2,803	49.24%	0	0.00%	2,889	50.76%
1896	2,900	48.20%	3,067	50.97%	50	0.83%
1900	3,024	51.36%	2,799	47.54%	65	1.10%
1904	3,234	59.26%	1,808	33.13%	415	7.60%
1908	2,695	47.83%	2,686	47.67%	253	4.49%
1912	1,448	27.04%	2,209	41.25%	1,698	31.71%
1916	3,370	37.58%	5,209	58.09%	388	4.33%
1920	4,194	52.09%	3,632	45.11%	225	2.79%
1924	4,210	48.96%	2,850	33.15%	1,538	17.89%
1928	7,251	75.88%	2,223	23.26%	82	0.86%
1932	4,277	42.62%	5,577	55.58%	181	1.80%
1936	5,402	48.58%	5,714	51.38%	4	0.04%
1940	5,751	53.61%	4,898	45.66%	78	0.73%
1944	4,790	56.68%	3,622	42.86%	39	0.46%
1948	4,225	51.43%	3,879	47.22%	111	1.35%
1952	5,785	65.26%	3,023	34.10%	56	0.63%
1956	5,306	62.39%	3,151	37.05%	47	0.55%
1960	5,062	63.03%	2,928	36.46%	41	0.51%
1964	3,290	44.93%	3,980	54.35%	53	0.72%
1968	3,983	56.87%	2,241	32.00%	780	11.14%
1972	4,776	70.09%	1,912	28.06%	126	1.85%
1976	3,589	51.80%	3,237	46.72%	103	1.49%
1980	4,263	59.22%	2,605	36.19%	331	4.60%
1984	4,858	68.40%	2,175	30.63%	69	0.97%
1988	3,660	57.80%	2,623	41.42%	49	0.77%
1992	2,876	40.17%	2,509	35.05%	1,774	24.78%
1996	3,318	50.17%	2,491	37.66%	805	12.17%
2000	3,852	61.07%	2,211	35.05%	245	3.88%
2004	4,372	65.39%	2,216	33.14%	98	1.47%
2008	4,240	62.53%	2,394	35.30%	147	2.17%
2012	4,102	65.59%	1,996	31.92%	156	2.49%
2016	4,424	72.61%	1,336	21.93%	333	5.47%
2020	5,023	75.24%	1,541	23.08%	112	1.68%
2024	5,003	76.13%	1,444	21.97%	125	1.90%

=== Laws ===
Following amendment to the Kansas Constitution in 1986, the county remained a prohibition, or "dry", county until 1992, when voters approved the sale of alcoholic liquor by the individual drink with a 30% food sales requirement.

== Education ==
=== Colleges ===
- Fort Scott Community College

=== Unified school districts ===
- Fort Scott USD 234
- Uniontown USD 235

== Communities ==
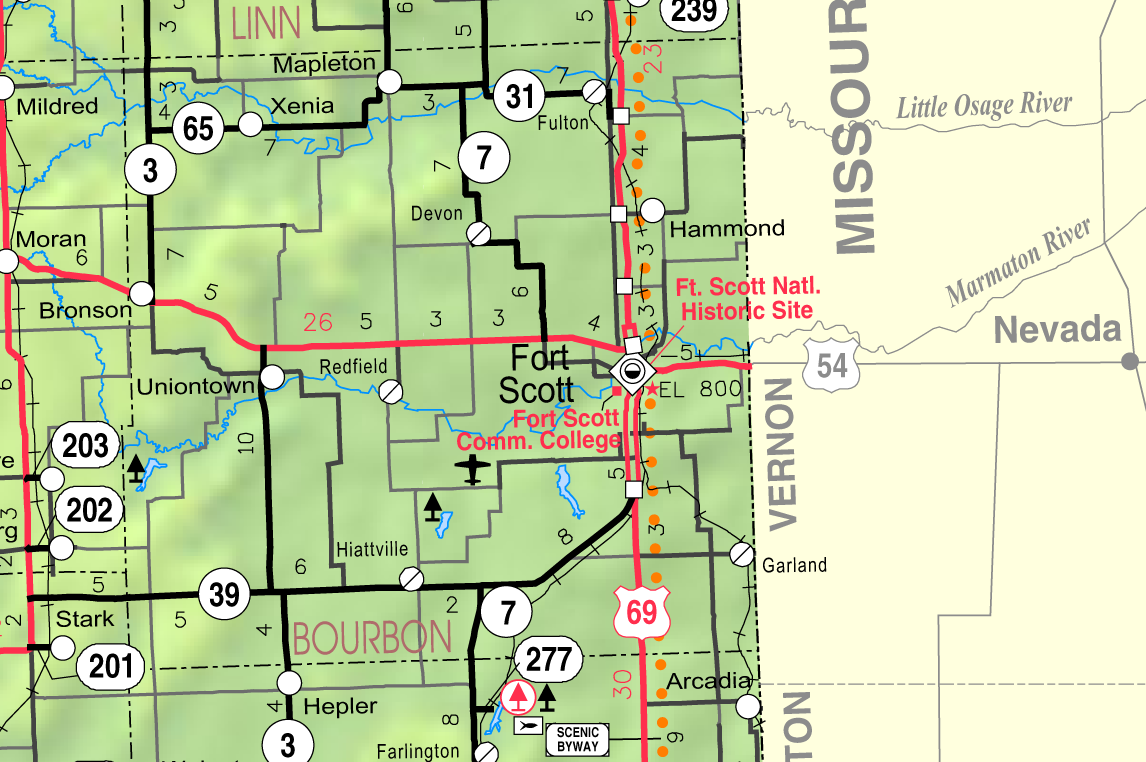
2005 map of Bourbon County (map legend)

List of townships / incorporated cities / unincorporated communities / extinct former communities within Bourbon County.

=== Cities ===
- Bronson
- Fort Scott (county seat)
- Fulton
- Mapleton
- Redfield
- Uniontown

=== Unincorporated communities ===
† means a community is designated a census-designated place by the United States Census Bureau

- Barnesville
- Berlin
- Devon†
- Garland†
- Godfrey
- Hammond
- Harding
- Hiattville
- Marmaton
- Pawnee Station
- Porterville
- Xenia

=== Townships ===
Bourbon County is divided into 11 townships. The city of Fort Scott is considered governmentally independent and is excluded from the census figures for the townships. In the following table, the population center is the largest city (or cities) included in that township's population total, if it is of a significant size.

Township	FIPS	Population center	Population	Population density /km^{2} (/sq mi)	Land area km^{2} (sq mi)	Water area km^{2} (sq mi)	Water %	Geographic coordinates
Drywood	18750		394	3 (8)	120 (47)	0 (0)	0.19%	37°43′19″N 94°40′36″W
Franklin	24300		312	2 (4)	185 (71)	0 (0)	0.13%	37°59′41″N 94°59′14″W
Freedom	24600	Fulton	505	4 (12)	113 (44)	0 (0)	0.17%	38°0′4″N 94°44′45″W
Marion	44650	Bronson, Uniontown	1,165	4 (12)	259 (100)	0 (0)	0.19%	37°51′14″N 95°1′12″W
Marmaton	44900		815	6 (15)	145 (56)	0 (0)	0.13%	37°48′57″N 94°50′16″W
Mill Creek	46675		472	3 (9)	136 (52)	1 (0)	0.42%	37°54′45″N 94°50′14″W
Osage	53100		394	3 (8)	125 (48)	0 (0)	0.16%	37°58′40″N 94°39′33″W
Pawnee	54775		308	2 (6)	126 (49)	0 (0)	0.31%	37°43′31″N 94°50′30″W
Scott	63500		2,326	13 (34)	179 (69)	2 (1)	0.94%	37°48′35″N 94°41′30″W
Timberhill	70600	Mapleton	256	3 (7)	93 (36)	0 (0)	0.05%	38°0′31″N 94°52′57″W
Walnut	74850		135	1 (2)	154 (59)	0 (0)	0.13%	37°43′10″N 94°59′0″W
Sources: "Census 2000 U.S. Gazetteer Files". U.S. Census Bureau, Geography Division. Archived from the original on August 2, 2002.

== Notable people ==
- Richard Christy (b. 1974), drummer, radio personality; born and raised in Bourbon County
- Jonathan Davis (1871–1943), 22nd governor of Kansas; born in Bourbon County.
- Sarah Hall (1832–1926), president of Bourbon County Equal Suffrage Association; lived in Fort Scott, Bourbon County 1870–1911
- Gordon Parks (1912–2006), photographer, composer, author, poet, and film director, who became prominent in U.S. documentary photojournalism in the 1940s; born in Bourbon County

== See also ==
- National Register of Historic Places listings in Bourbon County, Kansas

Community information for Kansas

- Kansas locations by per capita income
- List of counties in Kansas
- List of townships in Kansas
- List of cities in Kansas
- List of unincorporated communities in Kansas
- List of ghost towns in Kansas
