= List of unincorporated communities in Kansas =

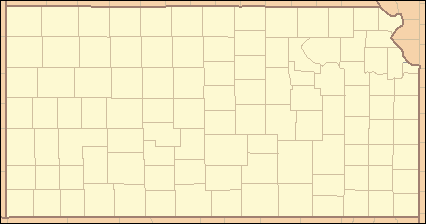

Map of the United States with Kansas highlighted

List of unincorporated communities in the U.S. state of Kansas, sorted by county.

On the right is a clickable map of the counties in Kansas.

== Allen County ==
- Bayard
- Carlyle
- Geneva
- Leanna
- Mildred†
- Petrolia

== Anderson County ==
- Bush City
- Glenlock
- Harris
- Mont Ida
- Scipio
- Selma
- Welda

== Atchison County ==
- Arrington
- Cummings
- Eden
- Farmington
- Good Intent
- Kennekuk
- Larkinburg
- Monrovia
- Oak Mills
- Parnell
- Port Williams
- Potter
- St. Pats
- Shannon

== Barber County ==
- Aetna
- Deerhead
- Eldred
- Elm Mills
- Forest City
- Gerlane
- Lake City
- Mingona
- Pixley
- Stubbs

== Barton County ==
- Beaver
- Boyd
- Dubuque
- Dundee
- Heizer
- Hitschmann
- Odin
- Redwing
- South Hoisington
- Stickney

== Bourbon County ==
- Barnesville
- Berlin
- Devon
- Garland
- Godfrey
- Hammond
- Harding
- Hiattville
- Marmaton
- Pawnee Station
- Porterville
- Xenia

== Brown County ==
- Baker
- Mercier
- Padonia
- Kickapoo Site 1
- Kickapoo Site 2
- Kickapoo Site 5
- Kickapoo Site 6
- Kickapoo Site 7
- Kickapoo Tribal Center
- Ioway Reservation
- Kickapoo Indian Reservation of Kansas
- Sac and Fox Reservation

== Butler County ==
- Beaumont
- Bois d'Arc
- Brainerd
- De Graff
- Gordon
- Haverhill
- Keighley
- Lorena
- Midian
- Pontiac
- Rosalia
- Wingate

== Chase County ==
- Bazaar
- Clements
- Saffordville
- Toledo
- Wonsevu

== Chautauqua County ==
- Cloverdale
- Grafton
- Hale
- Hewins
- Monett
- Osro
- Rogers
- Wauneta

== Cherokee County ==
- Carona
- Cokedale
- Crestline
- Daisy Hill
- Empire City
- Faulkner
- Hallowell
- Keelville
- Kniveton
- Lawton
- Lowell
- Mackie
- Melrose
- Neutral
- Quaker
- Riverton
- Sherman
- Sherwin
- Skidmore
- Stippville
- Turck

== Cheyenne County ==
- Wheeler

== Clark County ==
- Sitka

== Clay County ==
- Idana
- Industry
- Ladysmith

== Cloud County ==
- Ames
- Hollis
- Huscher
- Rice
- St. Joseph

== Coffey County ==
- Agricola
- Aliceville
- Halls Summit
- Jacobs Creek Landing
- Ottumwa
- Sharpe

== Comanche County ==
- Buttermilk

== Cowley County ==
- Akron
- Albright
- Box
- Cale
- Cameron
- Dale
- Eaton
- Eschs
- Floral
- Glen Crouse
- Glen Grouse
- Grand Summit
- Hackney
- Hooser
- Kellogg
- Maple City
- Moxham
- New Salem
- Otto
- Rainbow Bend
- Redbud
- Rock
- Silverdale
- Tannehill
- Taussig
- Tisdale
- Torrance
- Tresham
- Vinton
- Wilmot

== Crawford County ==
- Beulah
- Brazilton
- Capaldo
- Cato
- Chicopee†
- Coalvale
- Croweburg†
- Curranville
- Dry Wood
- Dunkirk
- Englevale
- Farlington†
- Fleming
- Franklin†
- Fuller
- Greenbush
- Gross
- Kirkwood
- Klondike
- Kniveton‡
- Litchfield
- Lone Oak
- Midway
- Monmouth
- Opolis†
- Polk
- Radley†
- Red Onion
- Ringo†
- South Radley
- Yale†

== Decatur County ==
- Allison
- Cedar Bluffs
- Kanona
- Leoville
- Lyle
- Traer

== Dickinson County ==
- Acme
- Buckeye
- Detroit
- Dillon
- Elmo
- Holland
- Industry
- Lyona
- Moonlight
- Navarre
- Pearl
- Shady Brook
- Stoney
- Sutphen
- Talmage
- Upland

== Doniphan County ==
- Bendena
- Blair
- Brenner
- Doniphan
- Fanning
- Iowa Point
- Moray
- Palermo
- Purcell
- Sparks

== Douglas County ==
- Big Springs
- Black Jack
- Clearfield
- Clinton
- Globe
- Grover
- Hesper
- Kanwaka
- Lake View
- Lone Star
- Midland
- Pleasant Grove
- Sibleyville
- Stull
- Vinland
- Worden

== Edwards County ==
- Centerview
- Fellsburg
- Nettleton
- Trousdale

== Elk County ==
- Busby
- Oak Valley

== Ellis County ==
- Antonino
- Catharine
- Chetolah
- Emmeram
- Munjor
- Pfeifer
- Toulon
- Turkville
- Walker
- Yocemento

== Ellsworth County ==
- Black Wolf
- Carneiro
- Langley
- Terra Cotta
- Venango
- Yankee Run

== Finney County ==
- Eminence
- Friend
- Gano
- Kalvesta
- Lowe
- Mansfield
- Peterson
- Pierceville
- Plymell
- Quinby
- Ravanna
- Ritchal
- Rodkey
- Tennis
- Wolf

== Ford County ==
- Bellefont
- Bloom
- Fort Dodge
- Howell
- Kingsdown
- South Dodge
- Wilroads Gardens
- Windthorst
- Wright

== Franklin County ==
- Centropolis
- Homewood
- Imes
- LeLoup
- Norwood
- Peoria
- Ransomville
- Richter

== Geary County ==
- Pawnee
- Wreford
- Fort Riley

== Gove County ==
- None

== Graham County ==
- Nicodemus
- Penokee
- St. Peter

== Grant County ==
- Hickok
- Ryus
- Stano
- Sullivans Tracks

== Gray County ==
- Charleston
- Haggard

== Greenwood County ==
- Ivanpah
- Lamont
- Neal
- Piedmont
- Quincy
- Reece
- Thrall
- Tonovay
- Utopia

== Hamilton County ==
- Kendall

== Harper County ==
- Corwin
- Crystal Springs
- Duquoin
- Freeport
- Runnymede

== Harvey County ==
- McLain
- Patterson
- Putnam
- Zimmerdale

== Haskell County ==
- None

== Hodgeman County ==
- None

== Jackson County ==
- Birmingham
- Larkinburg

== Jefferson County ==
- Boyle
- Buck Creek
- Dunavant
- Grantville
- Half Mound
- Lakeside Village
- Medina
- Mooney Creek
- Newman
- Rock Creek
- Thompsonville
- Williamstown

== Jewell County ==
- Ionia
- Lovewell
- Montrose
- North Branch
- Otego

== Johnson County ==
- Bonita
- Clare
- Clearview City
- Ocheltree
- Stilwell
- Wilder

== Kearny County ==
- None

== Kingman County ==
- Belmont
- Calista
- Cleveland
- Midway
- Mount Vernon
- Murdock
- Rago
- Skellyville
- St. Leo
- Varner
- Waterloo
- Willowdale

== Kiowa County ==
- Belvidere
- Brenham
- Joy
- Wellsford

== Labette County ==
- Angola
- Dennis
- Montana
- Strauss
- Valeda

== Lane County ==
- Alamota
- Amy
- Healy
- Pendennis
- Shields

== Leavenworth County ==
- Fairmount
- Fall Leaf
- Fort Leavenworth
- Hoge
- Jarbalo
- Kickapoo
- Lowemont
- Millwood
- Reno
- Wadsworth

== Lincoln County ==
- Ash Grove
- Denmark
- Shady Bend
- Vesper
- Westfall

== Linn County ==
- Boicourt
- Cadmus
- Centerville
- Critzer
- Farlinville
- Goodrich
- Mantey
- Trading Post

== Logan County ==
- Monument
- Page City

== Lyon County ==
- Miller
- Plymouth

== Marion County ==
- Antelope
- Aulne
- Canada
- Eastshore†
- Marion County Lake
- Pilsen†

== Marshall County ==
- Bremen
- Herkimer
- Home
- Lillis
- Marietta
- Vliets

== McPherson County ==
- Conway
- Elyria
- Groveland
- Johnstown
- New Gottland
- Roxbury

== Meade County ==
- Missler

== Miami County ==
- Beagle
- Block
- Bucyrus
- Hillsdale
- Jingo
- New Lancaster
- Somerset
- Stanton
- Wagstaff
- Wea

== Mitchell County ==
- Asherville
- Solomon Rapids

== Montgomery County ==
- Bolton
- Jefferson
- Sycamore
- Wayside

== Morris County ==
- Burdick
- Delavan
- Diamond Springs
- Skiddy

== Morton County ==
- Wilburton

== Nemaha County ==
- Baileyville
- Berwick
- Capioma
- Kelly
- Neuchatel
- St. Benedict
- Woodlawn

== Neosho County ==
- Kimball
- Leanna
- Morehead
- Odense
- Rollin
- Shaw
- South Mound
- Urbana

== Ness County ==
- Arnold
- Beeler

== Norton County ==
- Calvert
- Dellvale
- Densmore
- Oronoque
- Reager

== Osage County ==
- Barclay
- Michigan Valley
- Peterton
- Vassar

== Osborne County ==
- Bloomington
- Corinth
- Covert
- Forney
- Vincent

== Ottawa County ==
- Ada
- Lindsey
- Niles
- Sumnerville
- Verdi
- Wells

== Pawnee County ==
- Ash Valley
- Frizell
- Sanford
- Zook

== Phillips County ==
- Gretna
- Stuttgart
- Woodruff

== Pottawatomie County ==
- Blaine
- Duluth
- Flush
- Fostoria
- Saint Clere
- Swamp Angel

== Pratt County ==
- Cairo
- Croft
- Hopewell
- Natrona

== Rawlins County ==
- Blakeman
- Ludell
- Midway

== Reno County ==
- Castleton
- Darlow
- Huntsville
- Lerado
- Medora
- Yaggy
- Yoder

== Republic County ==
- Harbine
- Kackley
- Norway
- Rydal
- Talmo
- Wayne

== Rice County ==
- Mitchell
- Pollard
- Saxman
- Silica

== Riley County ==
- Bala
- Fort Riley
- Keats
- Lasita
- May Day
- Walsburg
- Winkler
- Zeandale

== Rooks County ==
- Codell
- Webster

== Rush County ==
- Hargrave
- Loretto
- Nekoma
- Schaffer

== Russell County ==
- Dubuque
- Fairport
- Milberger

== Saline County ==
- Bavaria
- Bridgeport
- Falun
- Glendale
- Hedville
- Kipp
- Mentor
- Salemsborg
- Shipton

== Scott County ==
- Chevron
- Grigston
- Hutchins
- Manning
- Modoc
- Pence
- Shallow Water

== Sedgwick County ==
- Anness
- Bayneville
- Clonmel
- Furley
- Greenwich
- Greenwich Heights
- Peck
- St. Marks
- St. Mary Aleppo
- St. Paul
- Schulte
- Sunnydale
- Waco
- McConnell AFB
- Oaklawn-Sunview

== Seward County ==
- Hayne

== Shawnee County ==
- Berryton
- Dover
- Elmont
- Kiro
- Montara
- Pauline
- Tecumseh
- Wakarusa
- Watson

== Sheridan County ==
- Angelus
- Seguin
- Studley
- Tasco

== Sherman County ==
- Caruso
- Edson
- Ruleton

== Smith County ==
- Bellaire
- Claudell
- Dispatch
- Harlan
- Reamsville
- Thornburg
- Womer

== Stafford County ==
- Dillwyn
- Neola
- Zenith

== Stanton County ==
- Big Bow
- Julian
- Saunders

== Stevens County ==
- None

== Sumner County ==
- Adamsville
- Anson
- Ashton
- Cicero
- Corbin
- Dalton
- Drury
- Ewell
- Millerton
- Milton
- Peck
- Perth
- Portland
- Riverdale
- Zyba

== Thomas County ==
- Halford
- Levant†
- Mingo

== Trego County ==
- Ogallah
- Riga
- Voda

== Wabaunsee County ==
- Bradford
- Keene
- Newbury
- Volland
- Wabaunsee
- Wilmington

== Wallace County ==
- Weskan

== Washington County ==
- Lanham

== Wichita County ==
- Coronado
- Lydia
- Marienthal
- Selkirk

== Wilson County ==
- Buxton
- Lafontaine
- Rest
- Roper
- Vilas

== Woodson County ==
- Cookville
- Durand
- Piqua
- Vernon

== Wyandotte County ==
- Turner
- Piper

== See also ==
- List of counties in Kansas
- List of townships in Kansas
- List of cities in Kansas
- List of census-designated places in Kansas
- List of ghost towns in Kansas
- Lists of places in Kansas
- Kansas locations by per capita income
- Kansas census statistical areas
- Kansas license plate county codes
