= National Register of Historic Places listings in Finney County, Kansas =

Location of Finney County in Kansas

This is a list of the National Register of Historic Places listings in Finney County, Kansas.

This is intended to be a complete list of the properties and districts on the National Register of Historic Places in Finney County, Kansas, United States. The locations of National Register properties and districts for which the latitude and longitude coordinates are included below, may be seen in a map.

There are 11 properties and districts listed on the National Register in the county.

This National Park Service list is complete through NPS recent listings posted March 21, 2025.

== Current listings ==
	Name on the Register	Image	Date listed	Location	City or town	Description
1	900 Block North Seventh Street Historic District	900 Block North Seventh Street Historic District	September 18, 1998 (#98001175)	901, 905, 907, 909, 911 N. 7th St. 37°58′23″N 100°52′16″W	Garden City	
2	Buffalo Hotel	Buffalo Hotel	January 31, 2008 (#07001480)	111-117 Grant Ave. 37°58′03″N 100°52′28″W	Garden City	
3	Bungalow Historic District	Bungalow Historic District	February 18, 2000 (#00000110)	1001, 1005, 1007, 1009, and 1011 N. 4th St. 37°58′24″N 100°52′00″W	Garden City	
4	Cedar Cliff	Cedar Cliff	May 23, 1997 (#97000464)	501 N. 9th St. 37°58′10″N 100°52′36″W	Garden City	
5	Finney County Point of Rocks	Finney County Point of Rocks	July 17, 2013 (#13000487)	Mansfield Rd. 37°54′03″N 100°43′33″W	Pierceville	Santa Fe Trail Multiple Property Submission
6	Hope House	Hope House	March 3, 2000 (#00000157)	1112 Gillespie Place; 37°58′13″N 100°51′36″W	Garden City	
7	Little Finnup House	Little Finnup House	March 9, 2000 (#00000155)	401 N. 9th St. 37°58′07″N 100°52′36″W	Garden City	
8	Sabine Hall	Sabine Hall	February 16, 1996 (#96000075)	201 W Buffalo Jones Ave. 37°58′22″N 100°52′32″W	Garden City	
9	The J.H. Stevens-C.L. Thompson Block Historic District		2024-06-177 (#100009417)	401-409 North Main; 37°58′04″N 100°52′25″W	Garden City	
10	Sen. William H. Thompson House	Sen. William H. Thompson House	February 16, 1996 (#96000037)	902 N. 6th St. 37°58′21″N 100°52′09″W	Garden City	
11	Windsor Hotel	Windsor Hotel	April 26, 1972 (#72000498)	421 N. Main St. 37°58′06″N 100°52′26″W	Garden City	

== See also ==
- List of National Historic Landmarks in Kansas
- National Register of Historic Places listings in Kansas
