= Garden City Regional Airport =

- IATA: GCK; ICAO: KGCK; FAA LID: GCK

Summary
- Airport type: Public
- Owner: City of Garden City
- Serves: Southwest Kansas
- Location: Pierceville Township, Finney County
- Elevation AMSL: 2,891 ft (881 m)
- Coordinates: 37°55′39″N 100°43′28″W
- Website: www.fly2gck.com

Maps
- FAA airport diagram as of April 2025
- Location within Kansas Location within the United States

Runways
Direction	Length		Surface
Direction	ft	m	Surface
17/35	7,299	2,225	Concrete
12/30	5,700	1,737	Concrete

Statistics
- Aircraft operations (2024): 14,528
- Based aircraft (2021): 62
- Emplanements (Calendar Year 2023): 27,856
- Source: Federal Aviation Administration

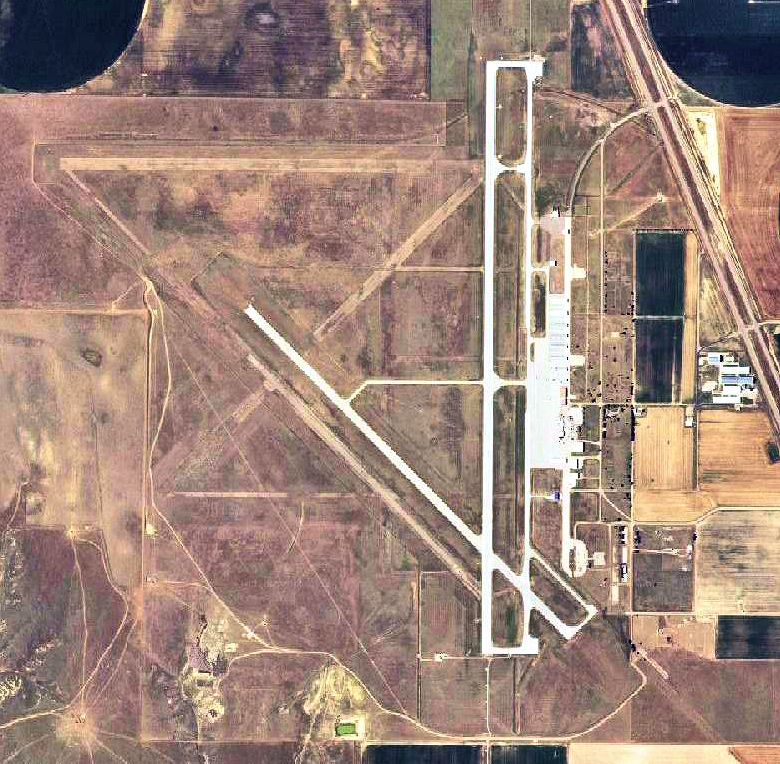
USGS 2006 orthophoto

Garden City Regional Airport (IATA: GCK, ICAO: KGCK, FAA LID: GCK) is nine miles southeast of Garden City, in Finney County, Kansas, United States. It sees one scheduled airline, subsidized by the federal government's Essential Air Service program at a cost of $5,897,640 (per year).

The National Plan of Integrated Airport Systems for 2021–2025 categorized it as a primary commercial service airport.

== History ==
During World War II the United States Army Air Forces used Garden City Airport as a training airfield by the Army Air Forces Flying Training Command, Gulf Coast Training Center. The facility was called Garden City Army Airfield.

The main Garden City Army Airfield and its auxiliaries closed in November 1945 and were declared excess by the military on 18 May 1947. Civil authorities developed the main airfield into Garden City Regional Airport.

Garden City Regional Airport's status as former Garden City AAF made it important during the terrorist attacks of September 11, 2001. When orders were dispatched to ground all domestic flights, three large jets were told to land at GCRA, the closest airport large enough for them. The airport had no stairs for large airliners and the passengers had to be evacuated by Garden City Fire Department ladder trucks.

In December 2011 the EAS program awarded American Eagle Airlines two daily non-stop flights to Dallas-Fort Worth. Flights began on April 3, 2012 with 44-seat and 50-seat Embraer ERJ family regional jets. American Eagle service was upgraded on November 30, 2022 with 65-seat Bombardier CRJ700 series regional jets operated by SkyWest Airlines. On February 15, 2024, the American Eagle service began operating with 65-seat Embraer 170 regional jets operated by Envoy Air.

On June 26, 2024 a new terminal building was opened replacing the former facility built in 1959. The new terminal has greatly expanded space and a passenger loading bridge to accommodate the current 65-seat jet aircraft now serving the airport.

== Historical airline service ==
Continental Airlines began serving Garden City in 1939 as a stop on a route between Denver, Colorado and Wichita, Kansas. Service was first operated through and old municipal airport three miles east of Garden City until 1947 when flights began landing at the current airfield. Lockheed Model 10 Electra and Douglas DC-3 aircraft were used and by 1957 the eastbound flights were redirected from Wichita directly to Kansas City making up to five stops.

Continental's service was replaced by Central Airlines in 1961 which in turn merged into Frontier Airlines in 1967. Frontier flew Convair 580 aircraft.

Commuter airline Air Midwest began service in 1976 and replaced Frontier in 1977 with direct flights to Denver and Wichita using 17-seat Fairchild Swearingen Metroliner aircraft. In 1988 Air Midwest began a series of code-share operations on behalf of major airlines that included Eastern Air Lines, in 1988 followed by Braniff from 1988 through 1989, then with USAir from 1991 through 2007. Eastbound flights were again switched from Wichita to Kansas City with one stop at Dodge City, Kansas.

In 1992 Mesa Airlines replaced Air Midwest on the westbound route to Denver using 19-seat Beechcraft 1900D aircraft. Mesa operated as United Express on behalf of United Airlines.

In 1998 Great Lakes Airlines replaced Mesa as United Express to Denver also using Beechcraft 1900D aircraft. Great Lakes lost its designation as United Express in 2002 but continued to serve Garden City from Denver under its own branding. After the departure of Air Midwest/US Airways Express in 2007, Great Lakes added flights to Kansas City.

All service was replaced by American Eagle in 2012 with regional jet flights to Dallas/Fort Worth as noted above.

== Facilities ==
The airport covers 1,848 acres (748 ha) at an elevation of 2,891 feet (881 m). It has two concrete runways: 17/35 is 7,299 by 100 feet (2,225 x 30 m) and 12/30 is 5,700 by 100 feet (1,737 x 30 m).

In calendar year 2024 the airport had 14,528 aircraft operations, an average of 40 per day: 778 Commercial, 7562 general aviation, 2998 air taxi and 1486 military. In December 2021, 62 aircraft were based at this airport: 53 single-engine, 5 multi-engine and 4 jet.

== Airlines and destinations ==
=== Passenger ===
American Eagle connects Garden City Airport to Dallas/Fort Worth International Airport.

Destinations map
Destinations from Garden City Regional Airport

=== Statistics ===
Carrier shares (December 2024 – November 2025)
Carrier	Passengers (arriving and departing)
Envoy Air	63,650(93.22%)
SkyWest	4,630(6.78%)

Top domestic destinations (December 2024 – November 2025)
Rank	Airport	Passengers	Airline
1	Dallas/Fort Worth International (DFW)	34,210	American Eagle

=== Cargo ===
The following airlines offer scheduled cargo service:

Airlines	Destinations
FedEx Feeder operated by Baron Aviation	Wichita

== See also ==
- List of airports in Kansas

== Other sources ==
- Essential Air Service documents (Docket DOT-OST-1998-3503) from the U.S. Department of Transportation:
  - Order 2009-9-5 (September 11, 2009): re-selecting Great Lakes Aviation, Ltd., to provide essential air service (EAS) at Dodge City, Garden City, Great Bend, Hays, and Liberal for the two-year period from October 1, 2009, through September 30, 2011, at combined annual subsidy rates of $8,897,565. Garden City, Kansas: Docket OST-1998-3503; Effective Period: Start of Denver-Only service through September 30, 2011; Scheduled Service: 30 nonstop round trips per week to Denver; Aircraft: Beech 1900, 19 seats.
  - Order 2011-10-24 (October 31, 2011): selecting American Eagle Airlines to provide essential air service (EAS) at Garden City for $2,919,026 annual subsidy. Effective Period: Two year period beginning when American Eagle begins full EAS through the 24th month thereafter. Service: 14 nonstop round trips per week to Dallas. Aircraft: Embraer Regional Jet.
  - Order 2014-3-9 (March 14, 2014): selecting American Airlines to provide Essential Air Service (EAS) at Garden City, Kansas. Garden City, Kansas: Docket 1998-3503; Effective Period: May 1, 2014, through July 31, 2016; Service: Fourteen (14) nonstop round trips per week to Dallas (DFW); Aircraft Type: 44-seat or larger Regional Jet; Annual Subsidy: $1,445,172.
