= Pierceville =

Pierceville can refer to:

== Places ==
United States

- Pierceville, Indiana
- Pierceville, Kansas
- Pierceville Township, Finney County, Kansas
- Pierceville, Michigan
- Pierceville, Wisconsin
