= Garden City Township =

Garden City Township may refer to the following townships in the United States:

- Garden City Township, Finney County, Kansas
- Garden City Township, Blue Earth County, Minnesota
