= Finney County Point of Rocks =

- U.S. National Register of Historic Places
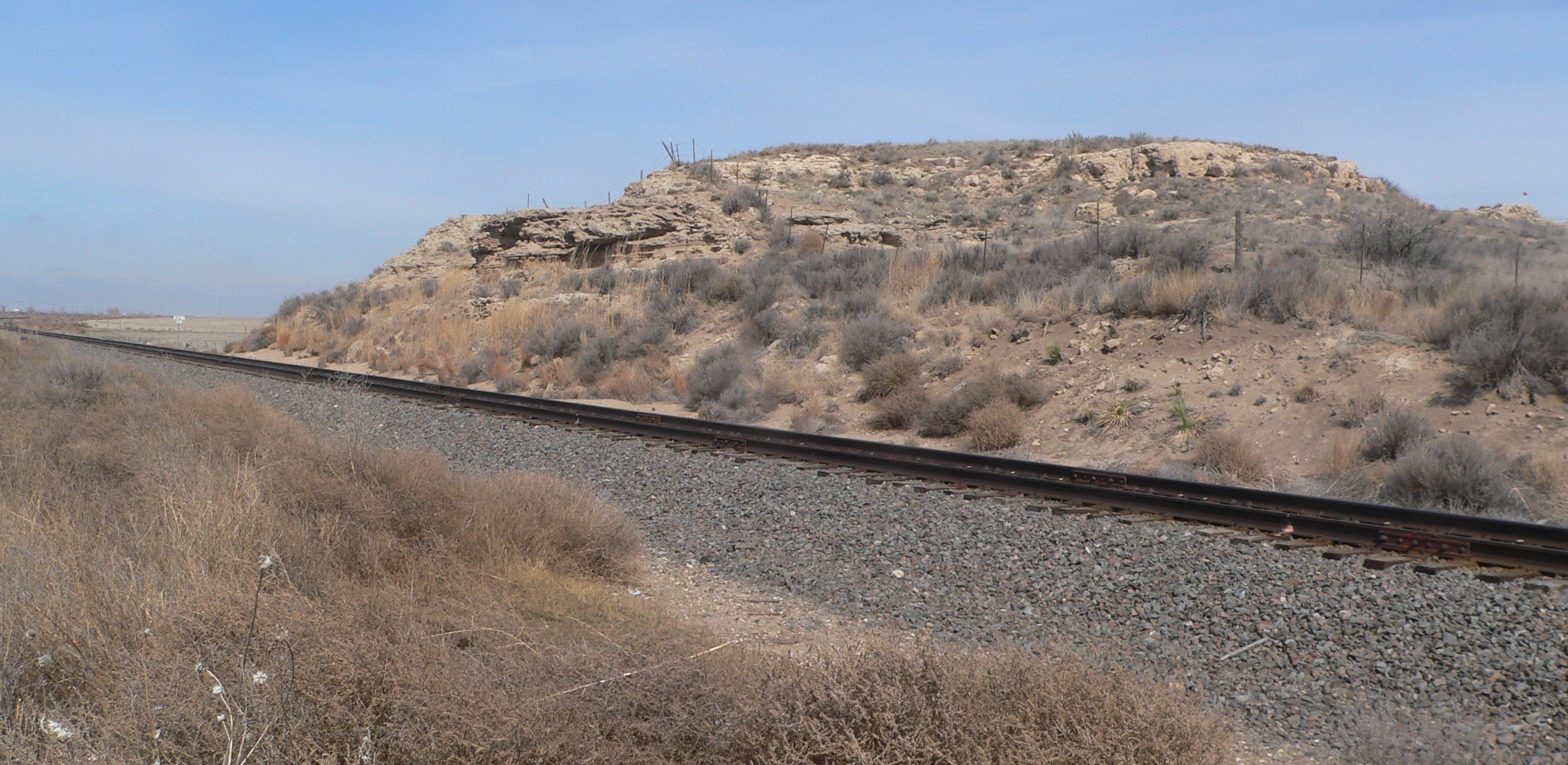
- Finney County Point of Rocks in 2015

- Location within Kansas Location within the United States
- Location: Mansfield Rd., Pierceville, Kansas
- Coordinates: 37°54′03″N 100°43′33″W
- Area: 304.79 acres (123.34 ha)
- NRHP reference No.: 13000487
- Added to NRHP: July 17, 2013

Finney County Point of Rocks, near Mansfield, Kansas, was listed on the National Register of Historic Places in 2013. It was a landmark on the Santa Fe Trail, in the section between the Lower and Upper Arkansas River crossings, before travelers had to choose between the Mountain Route or the Cimmaron Route of the trail.

The listed site is 304.79 acres (123.34 ha) in area and includes the highest rocky outcropping along the trail in that vicinity.
