= Sequoyah County =

Sequoyah County may refer to more than one place in the United States:

- Sequoyah County, Oklahoma
- Finney County, Kansas was originally Sequoyah County, Kansas
