= Pleasant Valley Township, Finney County, Kansas =

Pleasant Valley Township
- Township
- Location in Finney County
- Coordinates: 38°10′38″N 100°46′28″W
- Country: United States
- State: Kansas
- County: Finney

Area
  - Total: 143.26 sq mi (371.05 km^{2})
  - Land: 143.26 sq mi (371.05 km^{2})
  - Water: 0 sq mi (0 km^{2}) 0%
- Elevation: 2,917 ft (889 m)

Population (2020)
  - Total: 144
  - Density: 1.01/sq mi (0.388/km^{2})
- GNIS feature ID: 0485250

Pleasant Valley Township is a township in Finney County, Kansas, United States. As of the 2020 census, its population was 144.

== Geography ==
Pleasant Valley Township covers an area of 143.26 square miles (371.0 km^{2}) and contains no incorporated settlements.

== Transportation ==
Pleasant Valley Township contains one airport or landing strip, Air-Ag Airport.
