= Lincoln USD 298 =

Public school district in Lincoln, Kansas

Address
- 133 East Lincoln Street Lincoln, Kansas, 67455; United States
- Coordinates: 39°2′24″N 98°8′48″W

District information
- Type: Public
- Grades: PreK to 12
- Schools: 2
- NCES District ID: 2008790

Students and staff
- Students: 334 (2020–2021)
- Teachers: 32.2 (FTE)
- Staff: 25.2 (FTE)
- Student–teacher ratio: 10.37:1

Other information
- Website: usd298.com

Lincoln USD 298 is a public unified school district headquartered in Lincoln, Kansas, United States. The district includes the communities of Lincoln, Barnard, Beverly, Shady Bend, Westfall, and nearby rural areas.

== Schools ==
The school district operates the following schools:

- Lincoln Junior-Senior High School,
- Lincoln Elementary School.

== See also ==
- Kansas State Department of Education
- Kansas State High School Activities Association
- List of high schools in Kansas
- List of unified school districts in Kansas
