= Friend, Kansas =

Community in Kansas, United States

- Unincorporated community
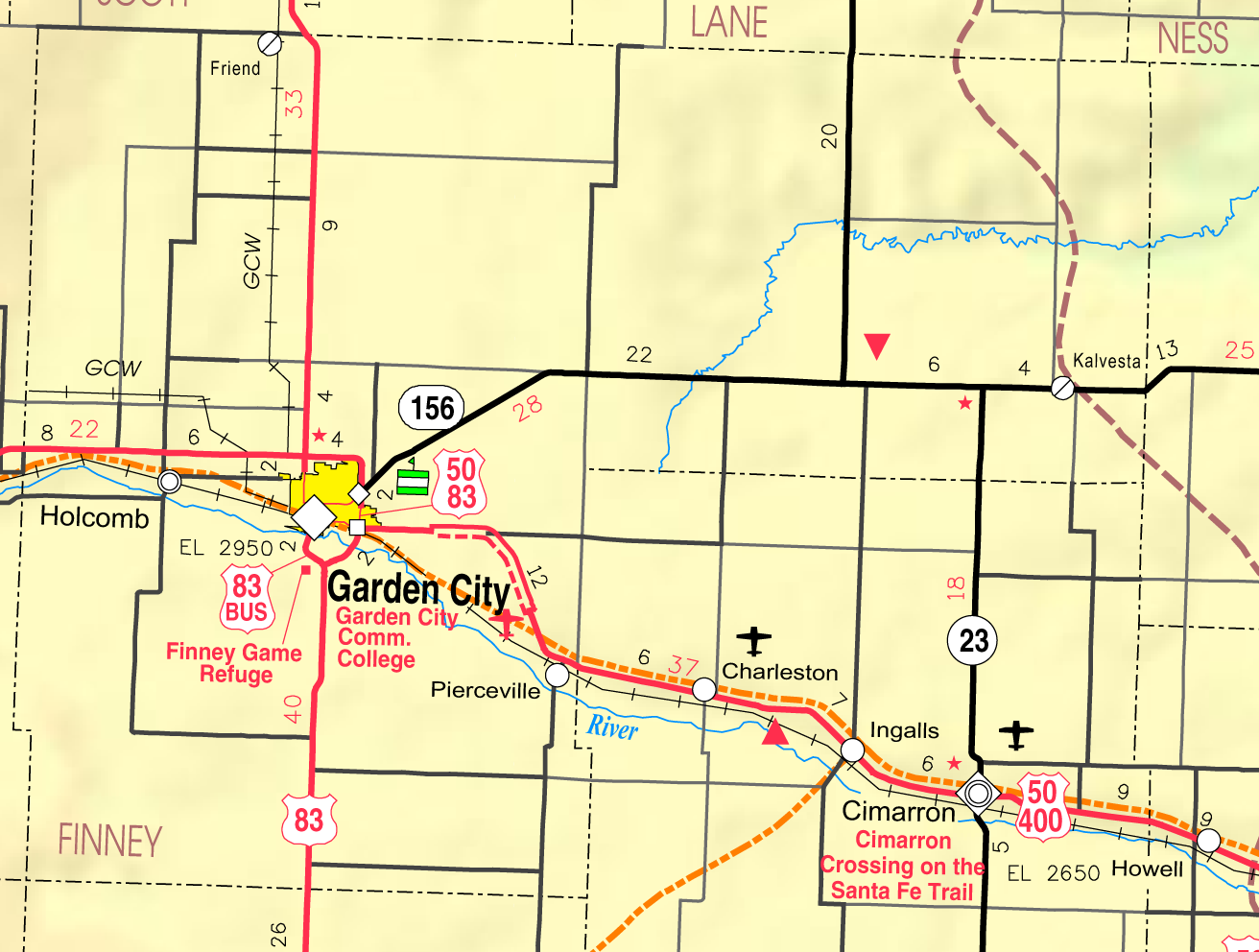
- KDOT map of Finney County (legend)

- Location within Kansas Location within the United States
- Coordinates: 38°15′36″N 100°54′42″W
- Country: United States
- State: Kansas
- County: Finney
- Elevation: 2,914 ft (888 m)
- Time zone: UTC-6 (CST)
  - Summer (DST): UTC-5 (CDT)
- Area code: 620
- FIPS code: 20-24800
- GNIS ID: 471533

Friend is an unincorporated community in Terry Township, Finney County, Kansas, United States. It is located next to U.S. Route 83 and the North Line of the Garden City Western Railway, south to the county line of Scott County.

== History ==
Originally the town was named McCue after Basil M. McCue of Hastings, Nebraska who was the organizer of the Garden City Gulf & Northern Railroad. The Santa Fe Railroad changed the name to Friend when it took over the railway line between Garden City and Scott City.

The post office in Friend closed in 1992.

== Education ==
The community is served by Garden City USD 457 public school district.
