= Oberlin USD 294 =

Public school district in Oberlin, Kansas

Address
- 131 E. Commercial St. Oberlin, Kansas, 67749; United States
- Coordinates: 39°49′14″N 100°31′43″W

District information
- Type: Public
- Grades: K to 12
- Schools: 2

Other information
- Website: usd294.org

Decatur Community Junior-Senior High School

Location
- 605 East Commercial Street; Oberlin, (Decatur County), Kansas 67749; United States

Information
- Type: Public high school
- Principal: Jeremy Holloway
- Staff: 17.60 (FTE)
- Enrollment: 151 (2023-24)
- Student to teacher ratio: 8.58
- Colors: Red and white
- Nickname: Red Devils
- Website: Decatur Community Junior-Senior High School

Oberlin USD 294 is a public unified school district headquartered in Oberlin, Kansas, United States. It includes the communities of Oberlin, Norcatur, Dresden (north of highway 383), Jennings (north of highway 383), Clayton (west of County Rd W-15 and north of highway 383), Cedar Bluffs, Traer, Kanona, Lyle, Reager, and nearby rural areas.

== Schools ==
The school district operates the following schools:

- Decatur Community Junior-Senior High School
- Oberlin Elementary School

== History ==
In 2006, Prairie Heights USD 295 underwent a dissolution, a majority of students moved to Hoxie USD 412, the rest to Oberlin USD 294.

In 2007, the school board considered instituting all-day kindergarten.

In 2007, the school board selected Pat Cullen as the superintendent; at the time Cullen was the superintendent of the Brady Public School District.

== See also ==
- Kansas State Department of Education
- Kansas State High School Activities Association
- List of high schools in Kansas
- List of unified school districts in Kansas
