= Ivanhoe Township, Kansas =

Ivanhoe Township
- Township
- Location in Finney County
- Coordinates: 37°46′59″N 100°55′34″W
- Country: United States
- State: Kansas
- County: Finney

Area
  - Total: 141.99 sq mi (367.76 km^{2})
  - Land: 141.99 sq mi (367.76 km^{2})
  - Water: 0 sq mi (0 km^{2}) 0%
- Elevation: 2,904 ft (885 m)

Population (2020)
  - Total: 489
  - Density: 3.44/sq mi (1.33/km^{2})
- GNIS feature ID: 0485284

Ivanhoe Township is a township in Finney County, Kansas, United States. As of the 2020 United States census, its population was 489, down from 666 in 2000.

== Geography ==
Ivanhoe Township covers an area of 141.99 square miles (367.8 km^{2}) and contains no incorporated settlements.
