= Leanna, Kansas =

Unincorporated community in Allen and Neosho Counties of Kansas

Coordinates: 37°43′58″N 95°19′57″W

Leanna is an unincorporated community in Allen and Neosho counties in the U.S. state of Kansas.

== History ==
A post office was opened in Leanna in 1881, and remained in operation until it was discontinued in 1920.

== Transportation ==
The nearest intercity bus stop is located in Chanute. Service is provided by Jefferson Lines on a route from Minneapolis to Tulsa.
