= Dubuque, Kansas =

Unincorporated community in Barton and Russell Counties in Kansas

- Unincorporated community
- St. Chatherine's Catholic Church in Dubuque

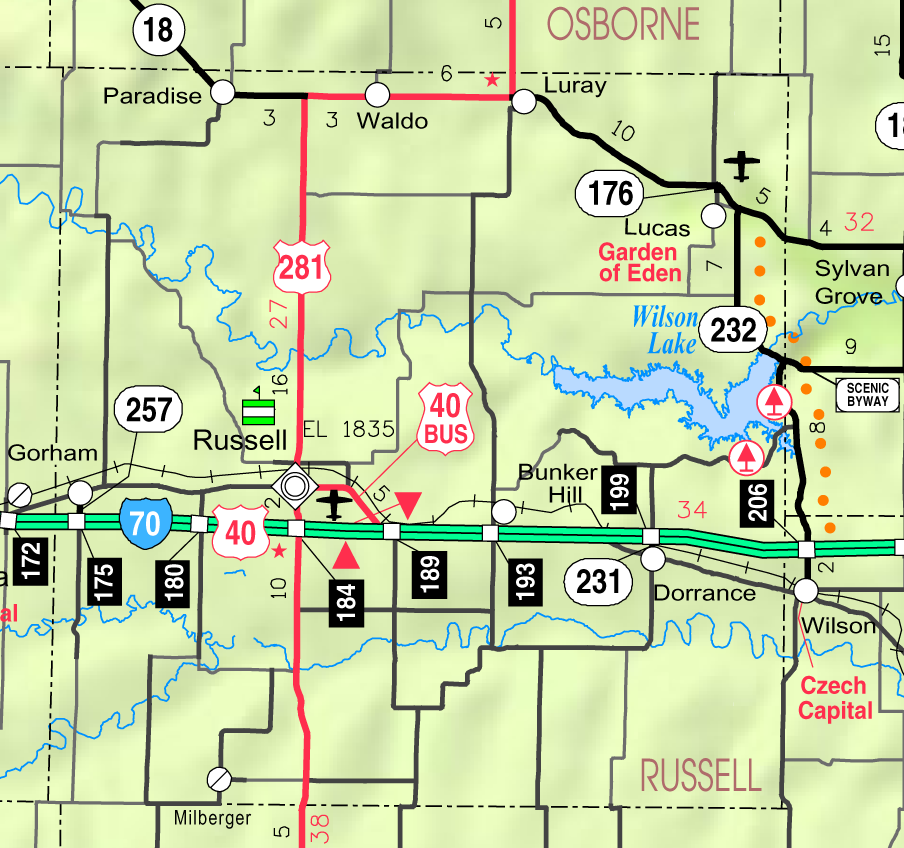
- KDOT map of Russell County (legend)

- Location within Kansas Location within the United States
- Coordinates: 38°41′45″N 98°36′32″W
- Country: United States
- State: Kansas
- County: Barton, Russell
- Elevation: 1,887 ft (575 m)
- Time zone: UTC-6 (CST)
  - Summer (DST): UTC-5 (CDT)
- ZIP Code: 67634
- Area code: 785
- FIPS code: 20-18775
- GNIS ID: 484734

Dubuque is an unincorporated community in Barton and Russell Counties in the U.S. state of Kansas. It is approximately 10 miles (16 km) south of Dorrance.

== History ==
Polish immigrants from Illinois, Indiana, and Wisconsin first settled the area after the American Civil War. They were soon followed by Volga Germans from Minnesota, Wisconsin, and Dubuque, Iowa. A rural post office named Dubuque opened in 1879, and the village was formally established in 1887. Devout Catholics, the local townsfolk built their first church in the early 1870s. They replaced it in 1901 with St. Catherine Catholic Church, which still stands. The post office closed in 1909. By the 1920s, Dubuque had begun to lose its population and its business community. Today, all that remains is the Catholic church and a cemetery.

== Geography ==
Dubuque lies 7 miles (11 km) south of the Smoky Hill River in the Smoky Hills region of the Great Plains. Located on the Barton County-Russell County line, Dubuque is roughly 18 miles (29 km) southeast of Russell and 24 miles (39 km) north-northeast of Great Bend. It is approximately 11 miles (18 km) south of Interstate 70 and 13 miles (21 km) east of U.S. Route 281.

== Education ==
The community is served by Central Plains USD 112 public school district.
