= Quinby, Kansas =

Unincorporated community in Finney County, Kansas

- Unincorporated community
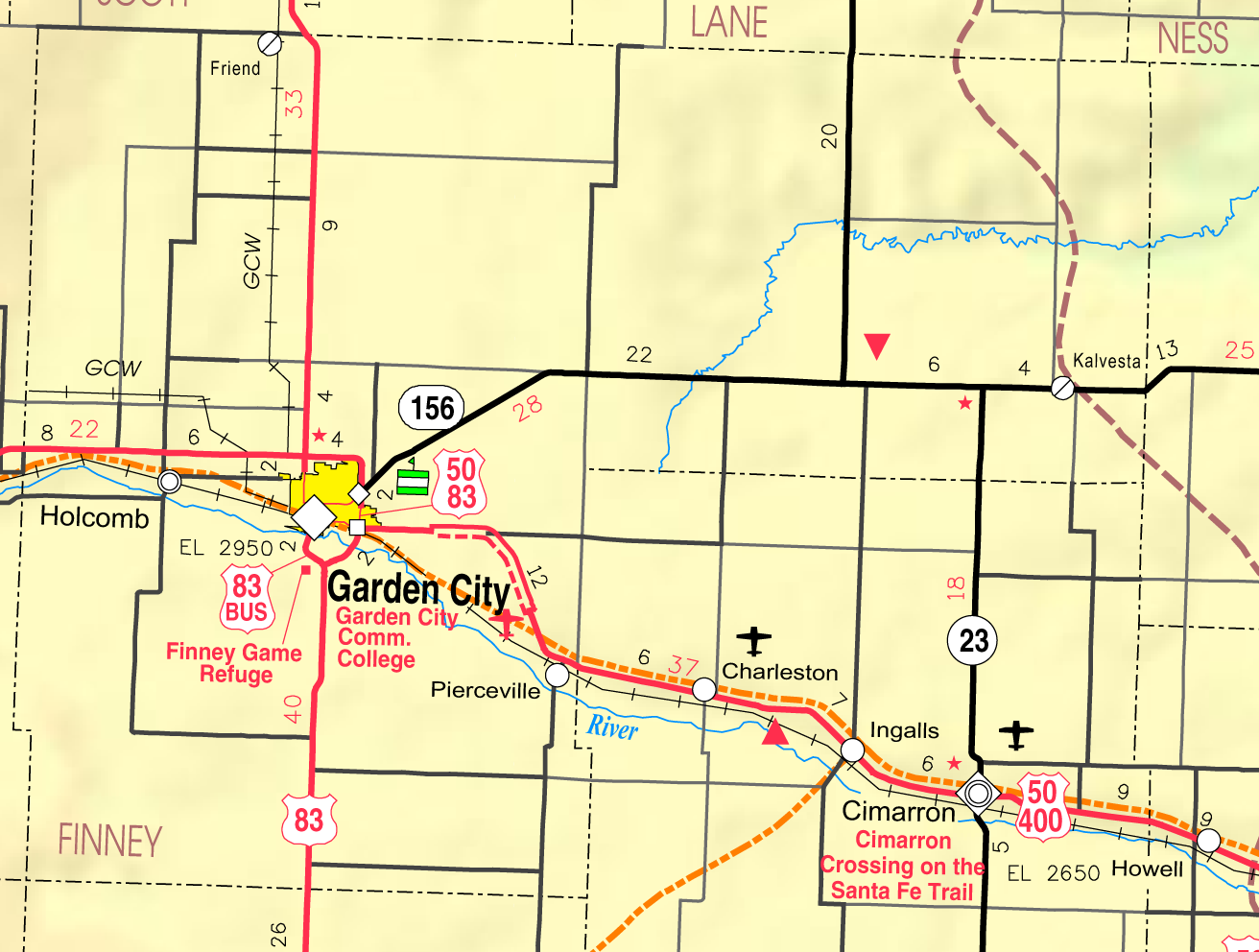
- KDOT map of Finney County (legend)

- Location within Kansas Location within the United States
- Coordinates: 37°59′18″N 100°55′44″W
- Country: United States
- State: Kansas
- County: Finney
- Elevation: 2,864 ft (873 m)
- Time zone: UTC-6 (CST)
  - Summer (DST): UTC-5 (CDT)
- Area code: 620
- FIPS code: 20-58125
- GNIS ID: 484924

Quinby is an unincorporated community in Finney County, Kansas, United States. It is 3.5 miles (5.6 km) west-northwest of Garden City.
