= Finney County, Kansas =

County in Kansas, United States

- County
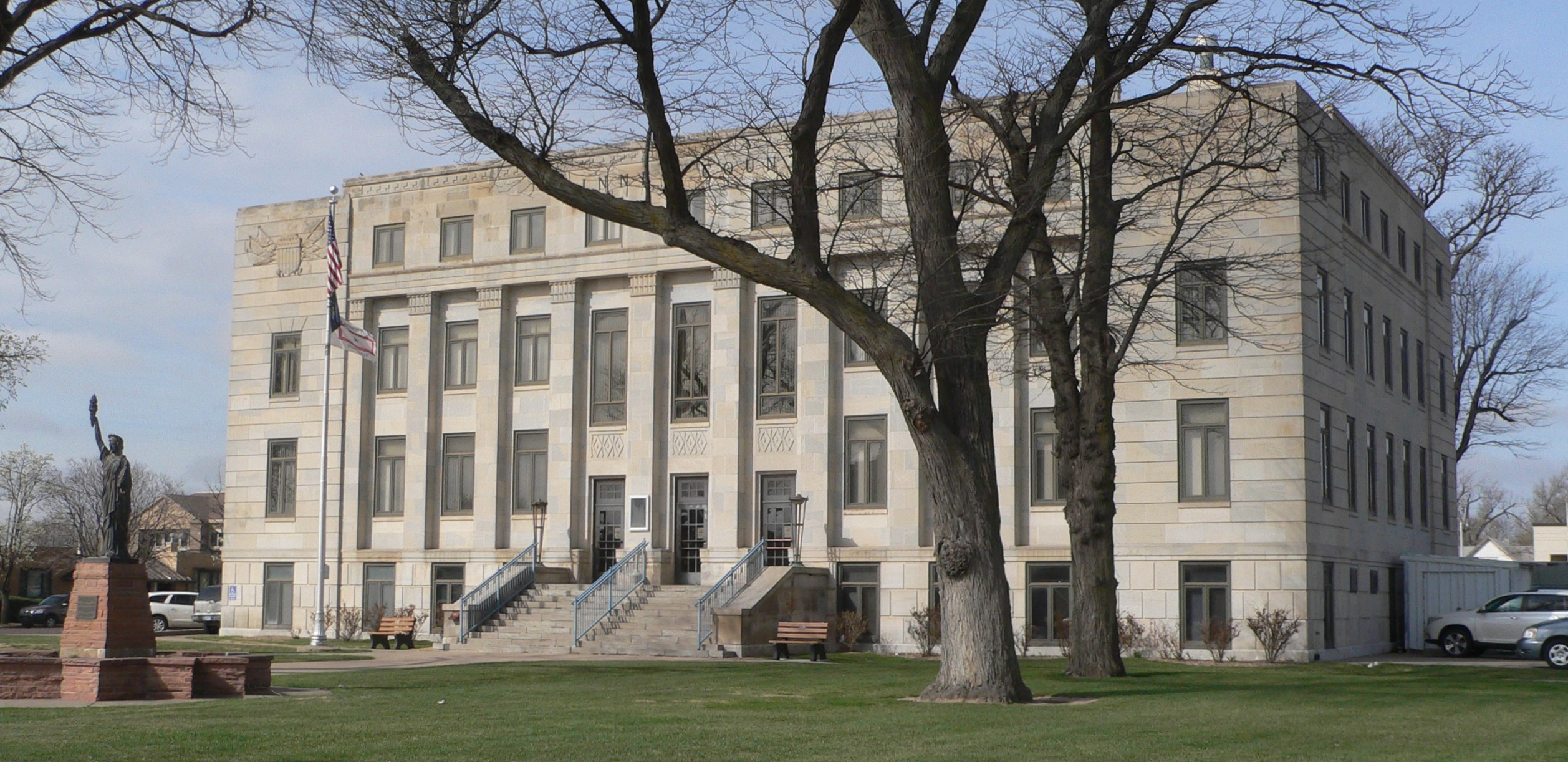
- Finney County Courthouse in Garden City (2015)

- Location within the U.S. state of Kansas
- Coordinates: 37°57′38″N 100°51′21″W
- Country: United States
- State: Kansas
- Founded: February 22, 1883
- Named for: David W. Finney
- Seat: Garden City
- Largest city: Garden City

Area
  - Total: 1,303 sq mi (3,370 km^{2})
  - Land: 1,302 sq mi (3,370 km^{2})
  - Water: 0.7 sq mi (1.8 km^{2}) 0.05%

Population (2020)
  - Total: 38,470
  - Estimate (2025): 37,505 ▼
  - Density: 29.5/sq mi (11.4/km^{2})
- Time zone: UTC−6 (Central)
  - Summer (DST): UTC−5 (CDT)
- Congressional district: 1st
- Website: www.finneycountyks.gov

Finney County is a county located in the U.S. state of Kansas. Its county seat and most populous city is Garden City. As of the 2020 census, the county population was 38,470. The county was named after David Finney, the lieutenant governor of Kansas from 1881 to 1885. In 2020, 51.4 percent of the population in the county was Hispanic, one of a few counties in Kansas with a Hispanic majority population.

== History ==
Finney County was established in 1883 and named after Lt. Gov. John W. Finney. The first white settlers arrived in 1878, settling along the Arkansas River and its tributaries.

What was to become Finney County began in March 1873 as Buffalo County and Sequoyah County (named after Sequoyah, the Cherokee Indian responsible for the development of the Cherokee alphabet). In 1881, the northern tier of townships was removed from Buffalo County and added to Lane County; the remainder was made part of newly-created Gray County, and later was taken to form part of Finney County. The two counties were merged in 1883 and renamed Finney County, in honor of then Lieutenant Governor David Wesley Finney. The county grew to the current shape after Garfield County was annexed to it in 1893 following a Supreme Court decision finding that Garfield County was less than one section/square mile short of the constitutionally defined minimum size of 432 square miles. The northeastern block, separate from the otherwise rectangular area, represents what at one time was Garfield County, which is now occupied partially by the Garfield Township. This combination of three separate counties makes Finney County the second-largest county in Kansas (after Butler County), comprising just over three times the constitutional minimum.

The town of Garden City was founded in 1879 by the cattle firm of Jones and Plummer, who established it as a shipping point for Texas cattle being driven along the Jones & Plummer Trail to Dodge City. Garden City grew rapidly as a railroad hub when the Atchison, Topeka & Santa Fe and Chicago, Rock Island & Pacific railroads arrived in 1888.

As described in Blackmar's Cyclopedia, Garden City "was a typical frontier town, with its gambling houses, dance halls and other adjuncts of border civilization" in its early years, but it quickly transformed into an agricultural center for southwestern Kansas.

Other early settlements such as Holcomb, Kalvesta, and Pierceville sprang up in the 1880s as Finney County became a prosperous region for wheat farming and cattle ranching. The county population boomed from just 537 in 1880 to over 5,000 by 1890 as homesteaders poured in.

In 1893, the former Garfield County was annexed into Finney County and organized as Garfield Township. Garfield County had originally been established in 1887 from parts of Finney County and other surrounding counties, but it struggled to maintain a viable tax base and population.

By 1910, Finney County had a population exceeding 10,000 as agriculture firmly took root in the region after its pioneering days on the frontier.

Between 2007 and 2008 Finney County became majority-minority.

== Geography ==
According to the U.S. Census Bureau, the county has a total area of 1,303 square miles (3,370 km^{2}), of which 1,302 square miles (3,370 km^{2}) is land and 0.7 square miles (1.8 km^{2}) (0.05%) is water. It is the second-largest county in Kansas by area.

=== Adjacent counties ===
- Scott County (north)
- Lane County (north)
- Ness County (northeast)
- Hodgeman County (east)
- Haskell County (south)
- Gray County (south)
- Grant County (southwest)
- Kearny County (west)

== Demographics ==
Historical population
Census	Pop.	Note	%±
1890	4,231		—
1900	3,469		−18.0%
1910	6,908		99.1%
1920	7,674		11.1%
1930	11,014		43.5%
1940	10,092		−8.4%
1950	15,092		49.5%
1960	16,093		6.6%
1970	18,947		17.7%
1980	23,825		25.7%
1990	33,070		38.8%
2000	40,523		22.5%
2010	36,776		−9.2%
2020	38,470		4.6%
2025 (est.)	37,505	▼	−2.5%
U.S. Decennial Census; 1790-1960 1900-1990; 1990-2000 2010-2020

Finney County is included in the Garden City, KS Micropolitan Statistical Area.

=== 2020 census ===
As of the 2020 census, the county had a population of 38,470. The median age was 31.8 years. 29.4% of residents were under the age of 18 and 11.0% of residents were 65 years of age or older. For every 100 females there were 102.1 males, and for every 100 females age 18 and over there were 101.2 males. About 80.5% of residents lived in urban areas and 19.5% lived in rural areas.

The racial makeup of the county was 51.5% White, 4.0% Black or African American, 1.0% American Indian and Alaska Native, 4.0% Asian, 0.1% Native Hawaiian and Pacific Islander, 17.0% from some other race, and 22.4% from two or more races. Hispanic or Latino residents of any race comprised 51.7% of the population.

There were 13,064 households in the county, of which 40.5% had children under the age of 18 living with them and 23.1% had a female householder with no spouse or partner present. About 23.1% of all households were made up of individuals and 7.6% had someone living alone who was 65 years of age or older.

There were 14,185 housing units, of which 7.9% were vacant. Among occupied housing units, 63.5% were owner-occupied and 36.5% were renter-occupied. The homeowner vacancy rate was 1.5% and the rental vacancy rate was 8.0%.

=== 2010 census ===
As of the 2010 census there were 36,776 people, 12,359 households and 8,903 families living in the county. The racial makeup of the county was 77.0% White, 2.3% Black or African American, 0.9% Native American, 3.4% Asian, 0.0% Pacific Islander, 13.6% from other races, and 2.9% from two or more races. Hispanic or Latino of any race were 46.7% of the population.

=== 2000 census ===
As of the 2000 census, there were 40,523 people, 12,948 households, and 9,749 families living in the county. The population density was 31 people per square mile (12 people/km^{2}). There were 13,763 housing units at an average density of 11 per square mile (4.2/km^{2}). The racial makeup of the county was 69.05% White, 1.25% Black or African American, 0.96% Native American, 2.87% Asian, 0.08% Pacific Islander, 22.99% from other races, and 2.80% from two or more races. Hispanic or Latino of any race were 43.30% of the population.

There were 12,948 households, out of which 46.00% had children under the age of 18 living with them, 59.80% were married couples living together, 10.50% had a female householder with no husband present, and 24.70% were non-families. 19.60% of all households were made up of individuals, and 6.30% had someone living alone who was 65 years of age or older. The average household size was 3.09 and the average family size was 3.55.

In the county, the population was spread out, with 34.30% under the age of 18, 11.00% from 18 to 24, 31.10% from 25 to 44, 16.60% from 45 to 64, and 7.00% who were 65 years of age or older. The median age was 28 years. For every 100 females there were 104.20 males. For every 100 females age 18 and over, there were 103.30 males.

The median income for a household in the county was $38,474, and the median income for a family was $42,839. Males had a median income of $29,948 versus $21,510 for females. The per capita income for the county was $15,377. About 10.00% of families and 14.20% of the population were below the poverty line, including 18.60% of those under age 18 and 10.70% of those age 65 or over.

== Government ==
=== Presidential election results ===
Finney County has primarily supported Republican presidential candidates throughout its history. In only six elections from 1884 to the present has the county not backed the Republican candidate, the last of these being in 1976 when Jimmy Carter won the county by only 102 votes.

Presidential election results

United States presidential election results for Finney County, Kansas
Year	Republican		Democratic		Third party(ies)	
Year	No.	%	No.	%	No.	%
1888	694	62.98%	348	31.58%	60	5.44%
1892	478	58.29%	0	0.00%	342	41.71%
1896	505	57.85%	366	41.92%	2	0.23%
1900	525	59.86%	336	38.31%	16	1.82%
1904	598	66.82%	215	24.02%	82	9.16%
1908	1,000	61.46%	551	33.87%	76	4.67%
1912	283	17.97%	573	36.38%	719	45.65%
1916	1,238	42.75%	1,370	47.31%	288	9.94%
1920	1,573	68.96%	619	27.14%	89	3.90%
1924	1,753	61.66%	614	21.60%	476	16.74%
1928	2,433	76.65%	709	22.34%	32	1.01%
1932	2,116	47.02%	2,300	51.11%	84	1.87%
1936	1,863	40.87%	2,682	58.84%	13	0.29%
1940	2,349	53.39%	2,027	46.07%	24	0.55%
1944	2,366	58.20%	1,667	41.01%	32	0.79%
1948	2,508	50.01%	2,367	47.20%	140	2.79%
1952	4,290	72.32%	1,597	26.92%	45	0.76%
1956	3,576	66.87%	1,752	32.76%	20	0.37%
1960	3,720	59.62%	2,490	39.90%	30	0.48%
1964	2,201	37.41%	3,639	61.86%	43	0.73%
1968	3,295	52.11%	2,521	39.87%	507	8.02%
1972	4,335	65.66%	2,062	31.23%	205	3.11%
1976	3,711	48.40%	3,813	49.73%	143	1.87%
1980	4,831	58.59%	2,689	32.61%	726	8.80%
1984	6,938	73.08%	2,458	25.89%	98	1.03%
1988	5,381	60.14%	3,408	38.09%	158	1.77%
1992	5,278	48.28%	2,612	23.89%	3,043	27.83%
1996	6,188	65.43%	2,420	25.59%	849	8.98%
2000	6,442	70.40%	2,431	26.57%	277	3.03%
2004	7,479	75.29%	2,351	23.67%	103	1.04%
2008	6,926	66.89%	3,275	31.63%	153	1.48%
2012	6,219	68.46%	2,682	29.52%	183	2.01%
2016	6,350	62.51%	3,195	31.45%	614	6.04%
2020	7,236	61.08%	4,325	36.51%	285	2.41%
2024	7,166	66.46%	3,425	31.77%	191	1.77%

=== Laws ===
Finney County was a prohibition, or "dry", county until the Kansas Constitution was amended in 1986 and voters approved the sale of alcoholic liquor by the individual drink with a 30% food sales requirement.

== Education ==
=== Unified school districts ===
- Holcomb USD 363
- Garden City USD 457

== Communities ==
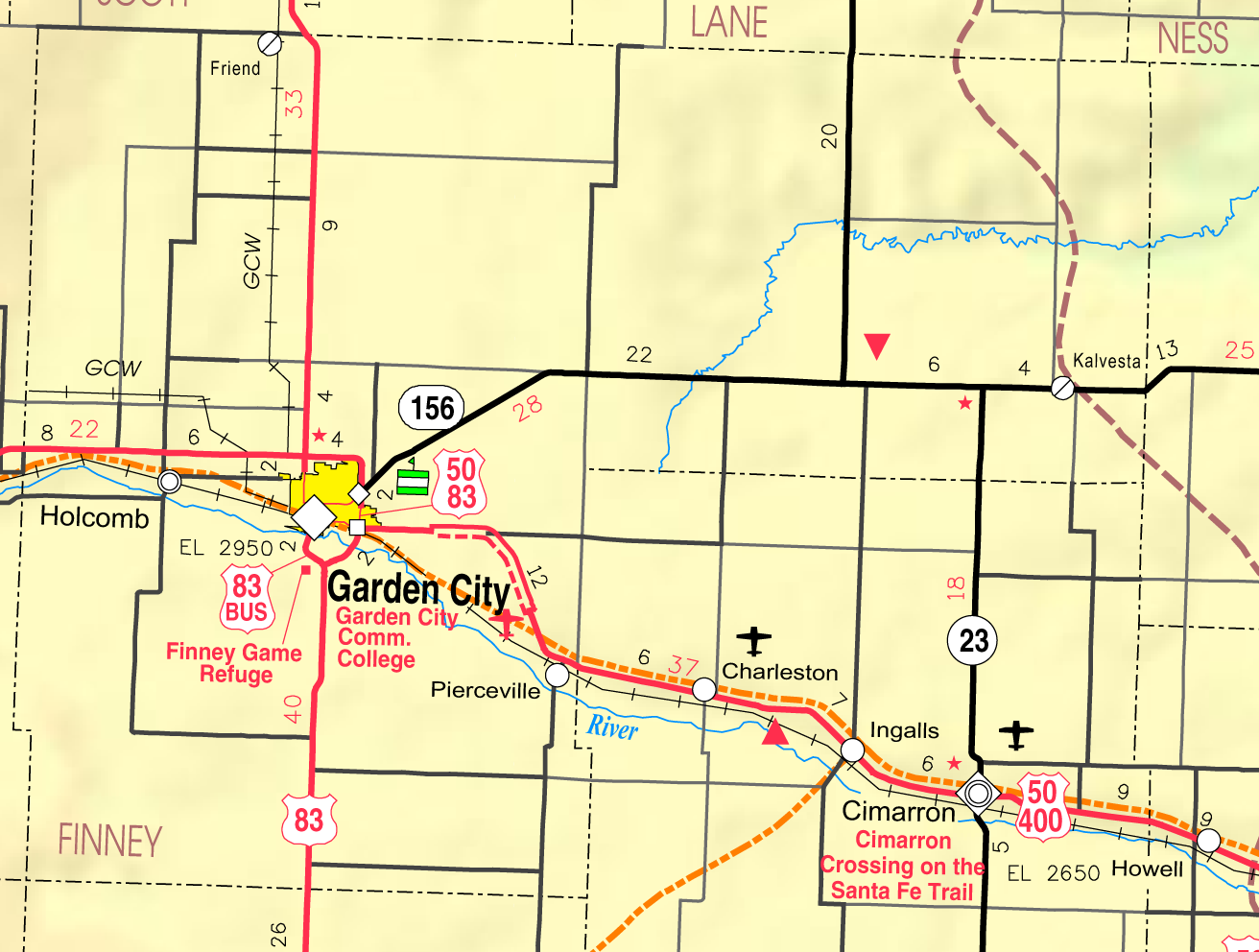
2005 map of Finney County (map legend)

List of townships / incorporated cities / unincorporated communities / extinct former communities within Finney County.
† means a community is designated a Census-Designated Place (CDP) by the United States Census Bureau.

=== Cities ===
- Garden City (county seat)
- Holcomb

=== Unincorporated communities ===
- Friend
- Gano
- Kalvesta
- Lowe
- Mansfield
- Peterson
- Pierceville†
- Plymell
- Quinby
- Ritchal
- Rodkey
- Tennis
- Wolf

=== Ghost towns ===
- Eminence
- Ravanna

=== Townships ===
Finney County is divided into seven townships. The city of Garden City is considered governmentally independent and is excluded from the census figures for the townships. In the following table, the population center is the largest city (or cities) included in that township's population total, if it is of a significant size.

Township	FIPS	Population center	Population	Population density /km^{2} (/sq mi)	Land area km^{2} (sq mi)	Water area km^{2} (sq mi)	Water %	Geographic coordinates
Garden City	25350		7,400	23 (59)	327 (126)	0 (0)	0.11%	37°57′39″N 100°51′22″W
Garfield	25600		331	0 (1)	1,116 (431)	1 (0)	0.09%	38°8′13″N 100°26′47″W
Ivanhoe	34675		666	2 (5)	368 (142)	0 (0)	0%	37°49′10″N 100°51′26″W
Pierceville	55800		551	1 (4)	378 (146)	0 (0)	0.01%	37°53′39″N 100°42′56″W
Pleasant Valley	56550		139	0 (1)	371 (143)	0 (0)	0%	38°10′40″N 100°48′6″W
Sherlock	64800	Holcomb	2,758	7 (17)	419 (162)	0 (0)	0.09%	38°0′32″N 101°0′8″W
Terry	70225		227	1 (2)	371 (143)	0 (0)	0.11%	38°9′22″N 100°59′52″W
Sources: "Census 2000 U.S. Gazetteer Files". U.S. Census Bureau, Geography Division. Archived from the original on August 2, 2002.

== See also ==
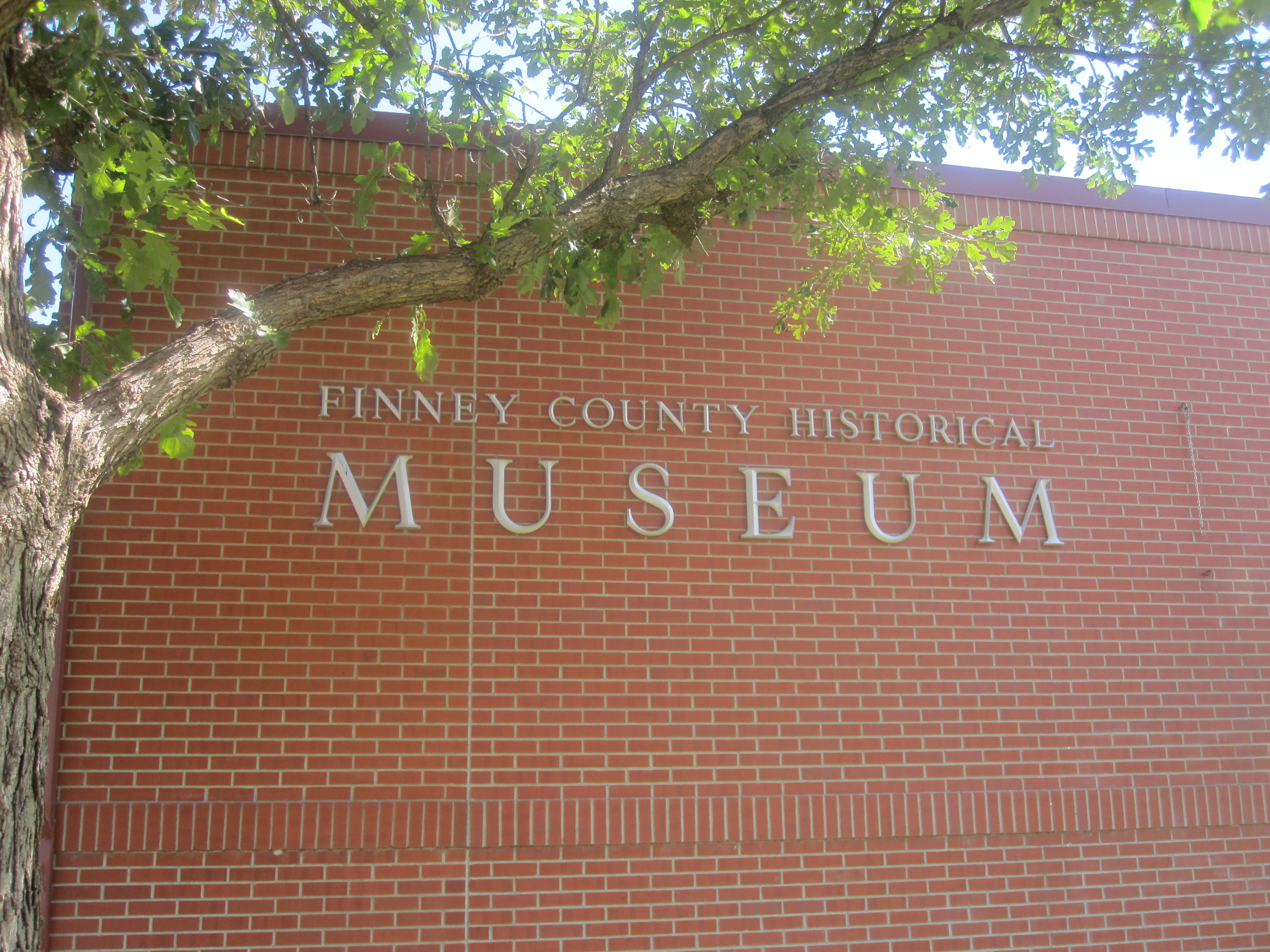
Finney County Historical Museum in Garden City is located in Finnup Park.

- Golden Triangle of Meat-packing
- National Register of Historic Places listings in Finney County, Kansas

Community information for Kansas

- Kansas locations by per capita income
- List of counties in Kansas
- List of townships in Kansas
- List of cities in Kansas
- List of unincorporated communities in Kansas
- List of ghost towns in Kansas
