= Reager, Kansas =

Unincorporated community in Norton County, Kansas

Coordinates: 39°49′37″N 100°05′46″W

Reager is an unincorporated community in Norton County, Kansas, United States.

== History ==
Reager had a post office from 1916 until 1923.

== Education ==
The community is served by Oberlin USD 294 public school district.
