= Tennis, Kansas =

Unincorporated community in Finney County, Kansas

- Unincorporated community
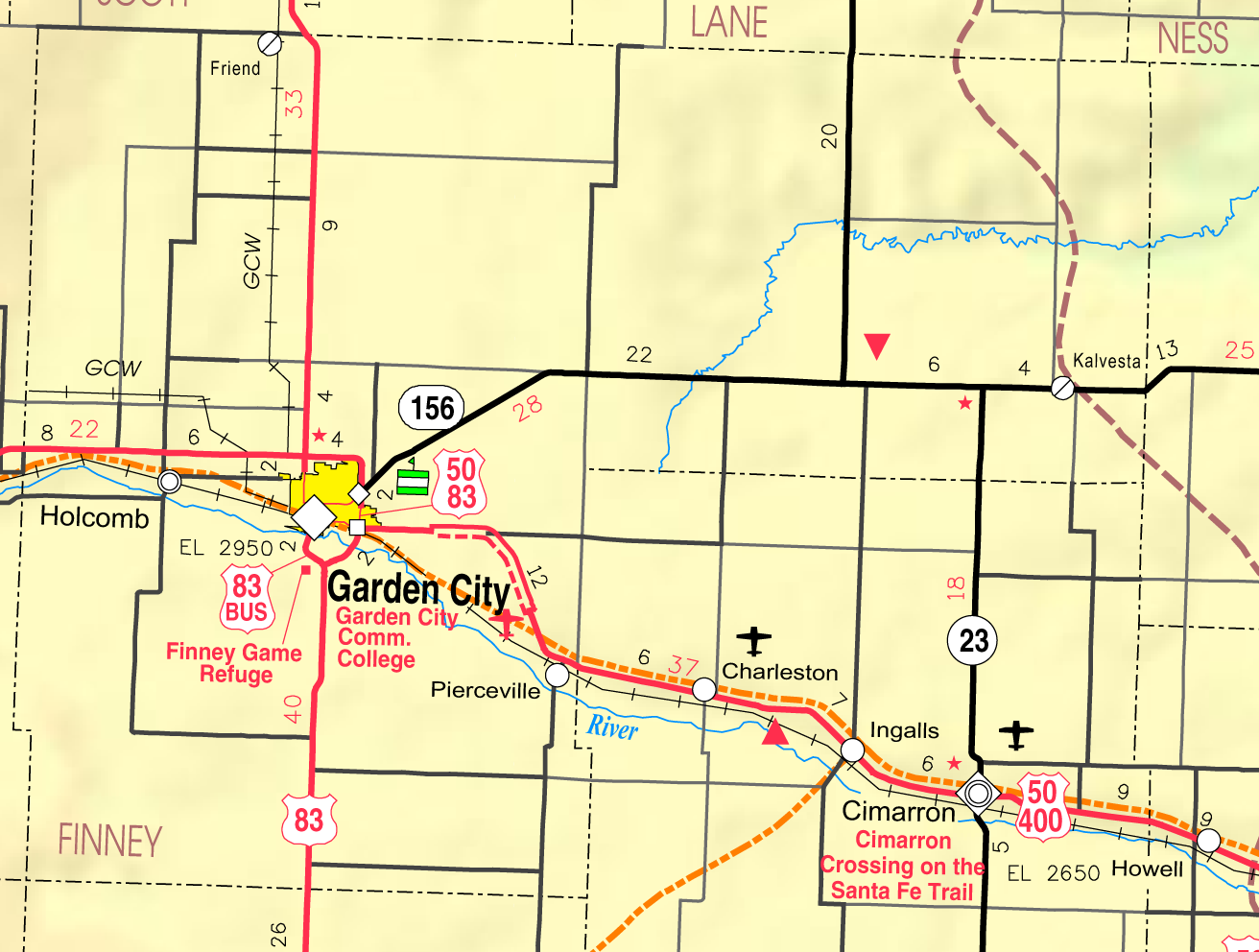
- KDOT map of Finney County (legend)

- Location within Kansas Location within the United States
- Coordinates: 38°09′48″N 100°54′40″W
- Country: United States
- State: Kansas
- County: Finney
- Elevation: 2,894 ft (882 m)
- Time zone: UTC-6 (CST)
  - Summer (DST): UTC-5 (CDT)
- Area code: 620
- FIPS code: 20-70150
- GNIS ID: 484565

Tennis is an unincorporated community in Finney County, Kansas, United States. It is 13 miles (21 km) north of Garden City.
