= Garden City USD 457 =

Public school district in Garden City, Kansas

Address
- 1205 Fleming Street Garden City, Kansas, 67846; United States
- Coordinates: 37.9770°N 100.8551°W

District information
- Type: Public
- Grades: PreK to 12

Other information
- Website: gckschools.com

Garden City USD 457 is a public unified school district headquartered in Garden City, Kansas, United States. The district includes the communities of Garden City, Friend, Pierceville, Plymell, and nearby rural areas.

== Schools ==
The school district operates the following schools:

High school:

- Garden City High School

Middle school:

- Horace Good Middle School
- Kenneth Henderson Middle School

Intermediate schools:

- Bernadine Sitts Intermediate Center
- Charles O. Stones Intermediate Center

Elementary schools:

- Jennie Barker Elementary School
- Alta Brown Elementary School
- Abe Hubert Elementary School
- Buffalo Jones Elementary School
- Georgia Matthews Elementary School
- Victor Ornelas Elementary School
- Plymell Elementary School
- Edith Schuerman Elementary School
- Gertrude Walker Elementary School
- Florence Wilson Elementary School
- Jennie Wilson Elementary School

Early childhood:

- Garfield Early Childhood Center

Other:

- Garden City Alternative Education
- Garden City Virtual Academy

== See also ==
- Kansas State Department of Education
- Kansas State High School Activities Association
- List of high schools in Kansas
- List of unified school districts in Kansas
