= Cedar Bluffs, Kansas =

Unincorporated community in Decatur County, Kansas

Coordinates: 39°58′44″N 100°33′43″W

Cedar Bluffs is an unincorporated community in Decatur County, Kansas, United States.

== History ==
A post office was opened at Cedar Bluffs in 1873, and remained in operation until it was discontinued in 1958.

Cedar Bluffs was laid out in about 1882.

== Education ==
The community is served by Oberlin USD 294 public school district.
