= Shady Bend, Kansas =

Unincorporated community in Lincoln County, Kansas

Shady Bend is an unincorporated community in Lincoln County, Kansas, United States. Shady Bend is located at 39°01′06″N 98°01′18″W.

== History ==
A post office was opened in Shady Bend in 1880, and remained in operation until it was discontinued in 1963.

== Education ==
The community is served by Lincoln USD 298 public school district.
