= Bungalow Historic District =

Historic district in Kansas, United States

- U.S. National Register of Historic Places
- U.S. Historic district
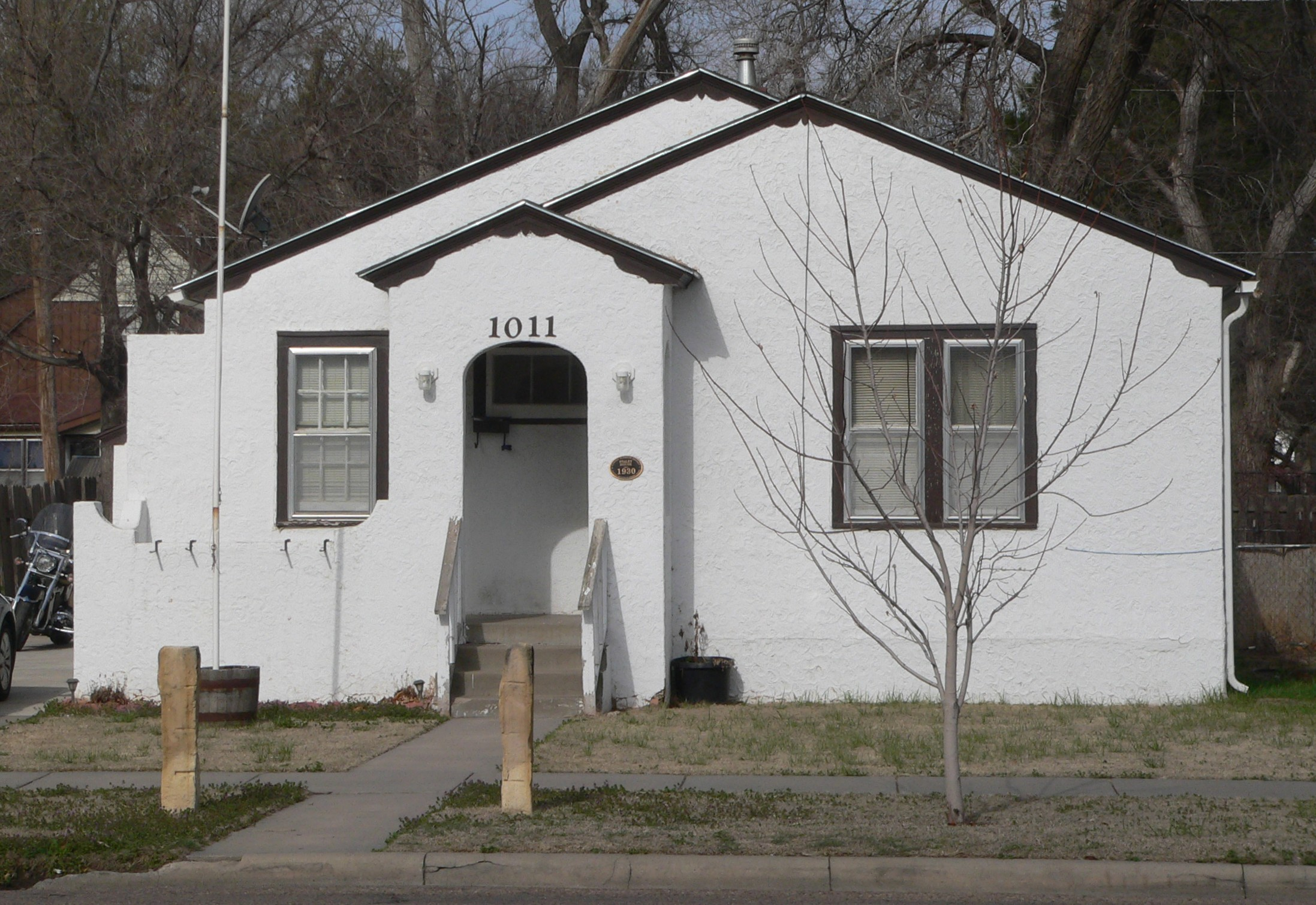

- Location within Kansas Location within the United States
- Location: 1001, 1005, 1007, 1009, and 1011 N. Fourth St., Garden City, Kansas
- Coordinates: 37°58′24″N 100°52′00″W
- Area: less than one acre
- Built: c.1925-1930
- Built by: J.F. Douglas, Walter Welch
- Architectural style: Bungalow/Craftsman, Mission/Spanish Revival
- NRHP reference No.: 00000110
- Added to NRHP: February 18, 2000

The Bungalow Historic District in Garden City, Kansas is a historic district which was listed on the National Register of Historic Places in 2000.

It includes five residential buildings and five garages, out of which six are contributing buildings, at 1001, 1005, 1007, 1009, and 1011 N. Fourth St.
