= Kniveton, Kansas =

Unincorporated community in Crawford County, Kansas, United States

Coordinates: 37°20′18″N 94°38′36″W

Kniveton is an unincorporated community in Cherokee and Crawford counties of Kansas in the United States.

== History ==
A post office was established in Kniveton in 1895, and remained in operation until it was discontinued in 1902.
