= Traer, Kansas =

Unincorporated community in Decatur County, Kansas

Coordinates: 39°55′42″N 100°39′59″W

Traer is an unincorporated community in Decatur County, Kansas, United States.

== History ==
A post office was opened in Traer in 1883, and remained in operation until 1971. The town was originally 1 mile west of its present location and was named Connersville, where a post office was established in 1875. When the town was moved in 1883, it was renamed Traer after the city of Traer, Iowa.

== Education ==
The community is served by Oberlin USD 294 public school district.
