= Neal, Kansas =

Unincorporated community in Greenwood County, Kansas

- CDP
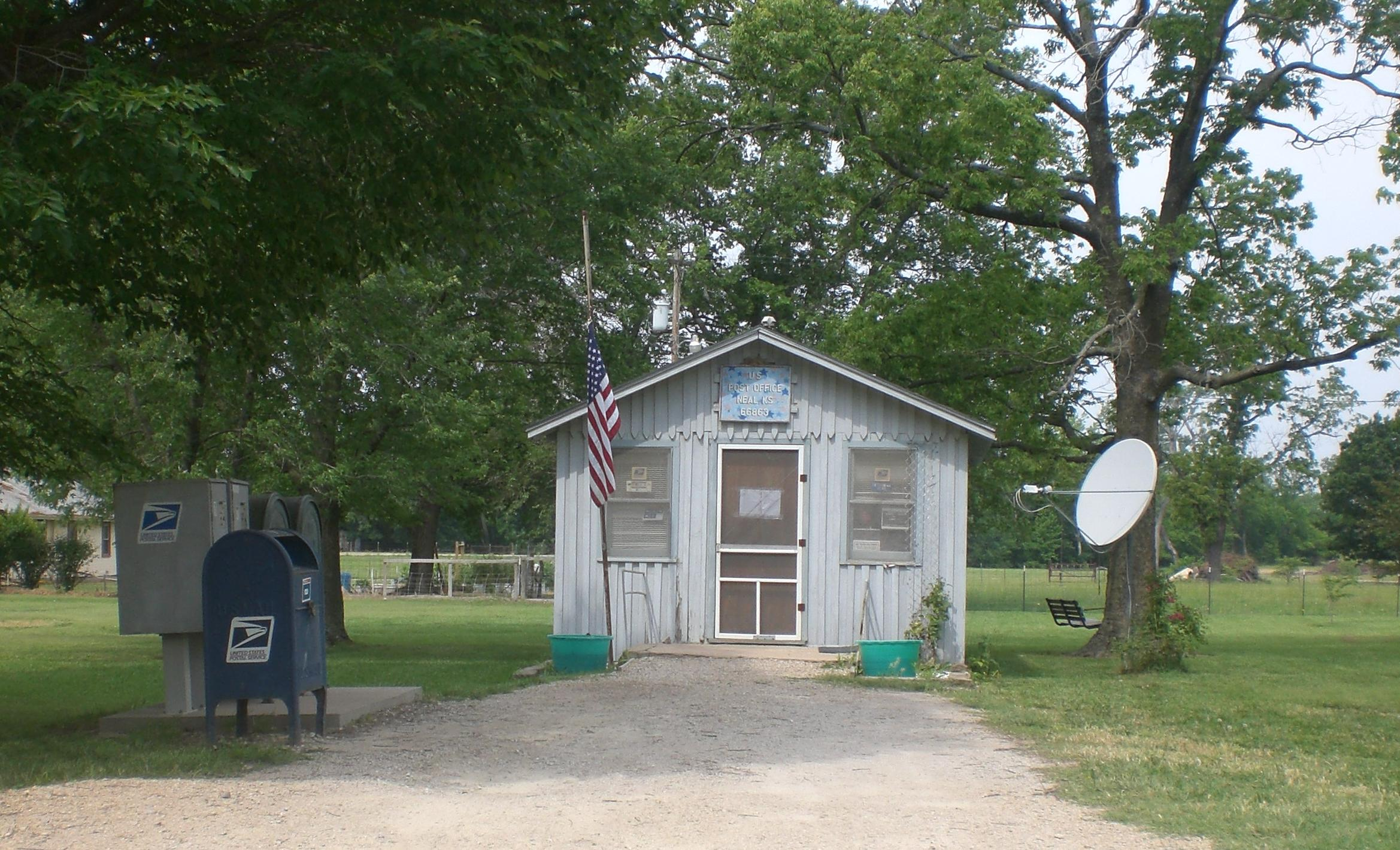
- Post Office in Neal, 2012

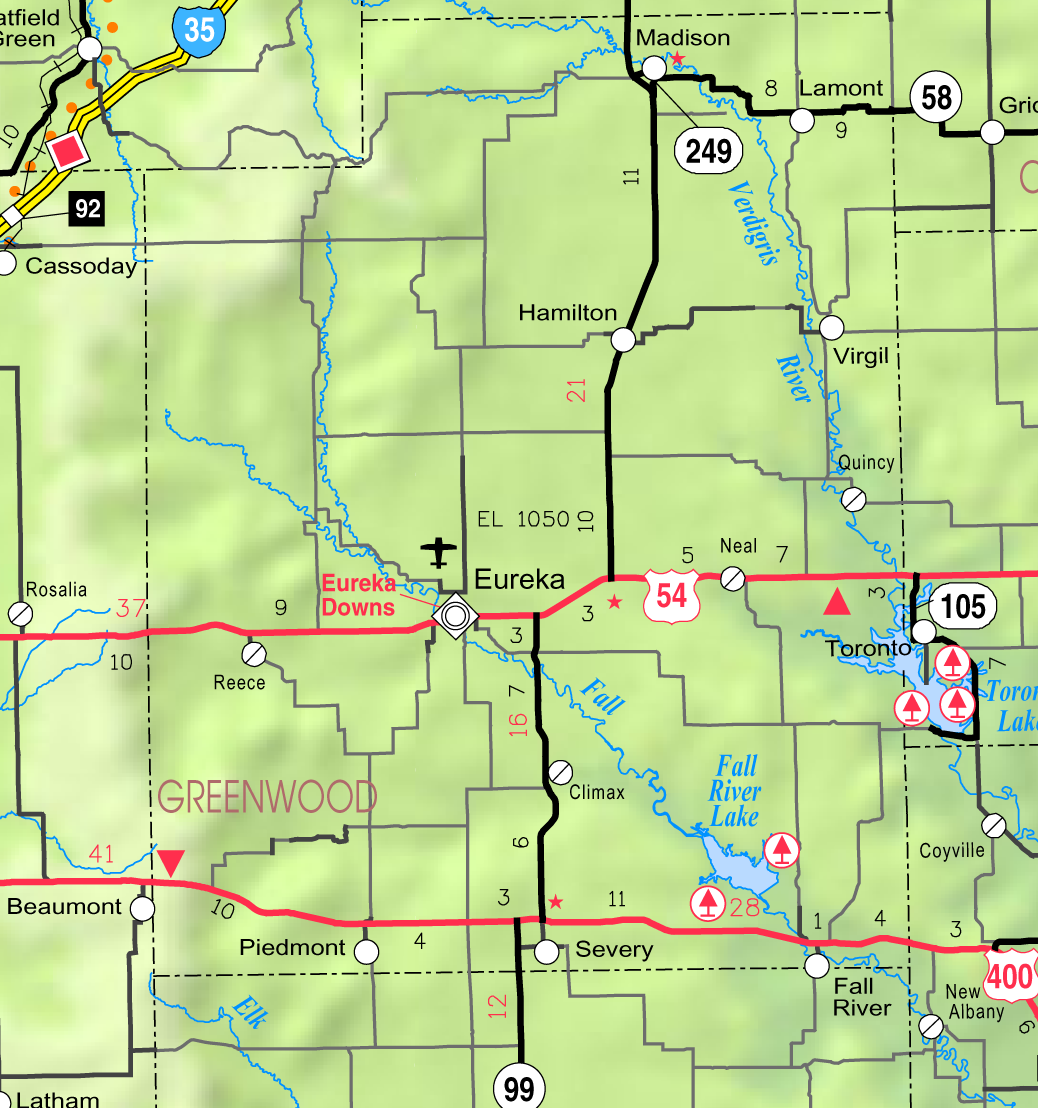
- KDOT map of Greenwood County (legend)

- Location within Kansas Location within the United States
- Coordinates: 37°50′02″N 96°04′51″W
- Country: United States
- State: Kansas
- County: Greenwood
- Elevation: 958 ft (292 m)

Population (2020)
  - Total: 37
- Time zone: UTC-6 (CST)
  - Summer (DST): UTC-5 (CDT)
- ZIP Code: 66863
- Area code: 620
- FIPS code: 20-49550
- GNIS ID: 2804491

Neal is a census-designated place (CDP) in eastern Greenwood County, Kansas, United States. As of the 2020 census, the population was 37. It is located approximately 10 miles east of the city of Eureka along U.S. Route 54 highway.

== History ==
The first post office in Neal was established in 1882. Although Neal is unincorporated, it has a post office, with the ZIP Code of 66863.

Neal was named for a minor official of the Missouri Pacific Railroad.

== Demographics ==
Historical population
Census	Pop.	Note	%±
2020	37		—
U.S. Decennial Census

The 2020 United States census counted 37 people, 20 households, and 12 families in Neal. The population density was 184.1 per square mile (71.1/km^{2}). There were 26 housing units at an average density of 129.4 per square mile (49.9/km^{2}). The racial makeup was 89.19% (33) white or European American (89.19% non-Hispanic white), 0.0% (0) black or African-American, 0.0% (0) Native American or Alaska Native, 0.0% (0) Asian, 0.0% (0) Pacific Islander or Native Hawaiian, 2.7% (1) from other races, and 8.11% (3) from two or more races. Hispanic or Latino of any race was 2.7% (1) of the population.

Of the 20 households, 10.0% had children under the age of 18; 55.0% were married couples living together; 35.0% had a female householder with no spouse or partner present. 40.0% of households consisted of individuals and 30.0% had someone living alone who was 65 years of age or older. The average household size was 2.0 and the average family size was 2.5. The percent of those with a bachelor's degree or higher was estimated to be 0.0% of the population.

0.0% of the population was under the age of 18, 0.0% from 18 to 24, 13.5% from 25 to 44, 40.5% from 45 to 64, and 45.9% who were 65 years of age or older. The median age was 57.8 years. For every 100 females, there were 164.3 males. For every 100 females ages 18 and older, there were 164.3 males.

== Education ==
The community is served by Eureka USD 389 public school district.
