= Garden City Township, Kansas =

Garden City Township Finney County, Kansas
- Township
- Location in Finney County
- Coordinates: 37°58′55″N 100°51′22″W
- Country: United States
- State: Kansas
- County: Finney

Area
  - Total: 126.3 sq mi (327.1 km^{2})
  - Land: 126.16 sq mi (326.76 km^{2})
  - Water: 0.13 sq mi (0.34 km^{2}) 0.1%
- Elevation: 2,877 ft (877 m)

Population (2020)
  - Total: 5,773
  - Density: 45.76/sq mi (17.67/km^{2})
- Time zone: UTC-6 (CST)
  - Summer (DST): UTC-5 (CDT)
- FIPS code: 20-25350
- GNIS ID: 471608

Garden City Township is a township in Finney County, Kansas, United States. As of the 2010 census, its population was 5,761. The population had increased to 5,773 at the 2020 census.

== Geography ==
Garden City Township covers an area of 126.3 square miles (327 km^{2}) and contains one incorporated settlement, Garden City (the county seat). According to the USGS, it contains three cemeteries: Hulpieu Homestead, Sunset Memorial Gardens and Valley View.

== Demographics ==
Historical population
Census	Pop.	Note	%±
1990	5,368		—
2000	7,400		37.9%
2010	5,761		−22.1%
U.S. Decennial Census

== Transportation ==
Garden City Township contains one airport or landing strip, Garden City Experiment Station Airport.
