= Buffalo Hotel =

- U.S. National Register of Historic Places
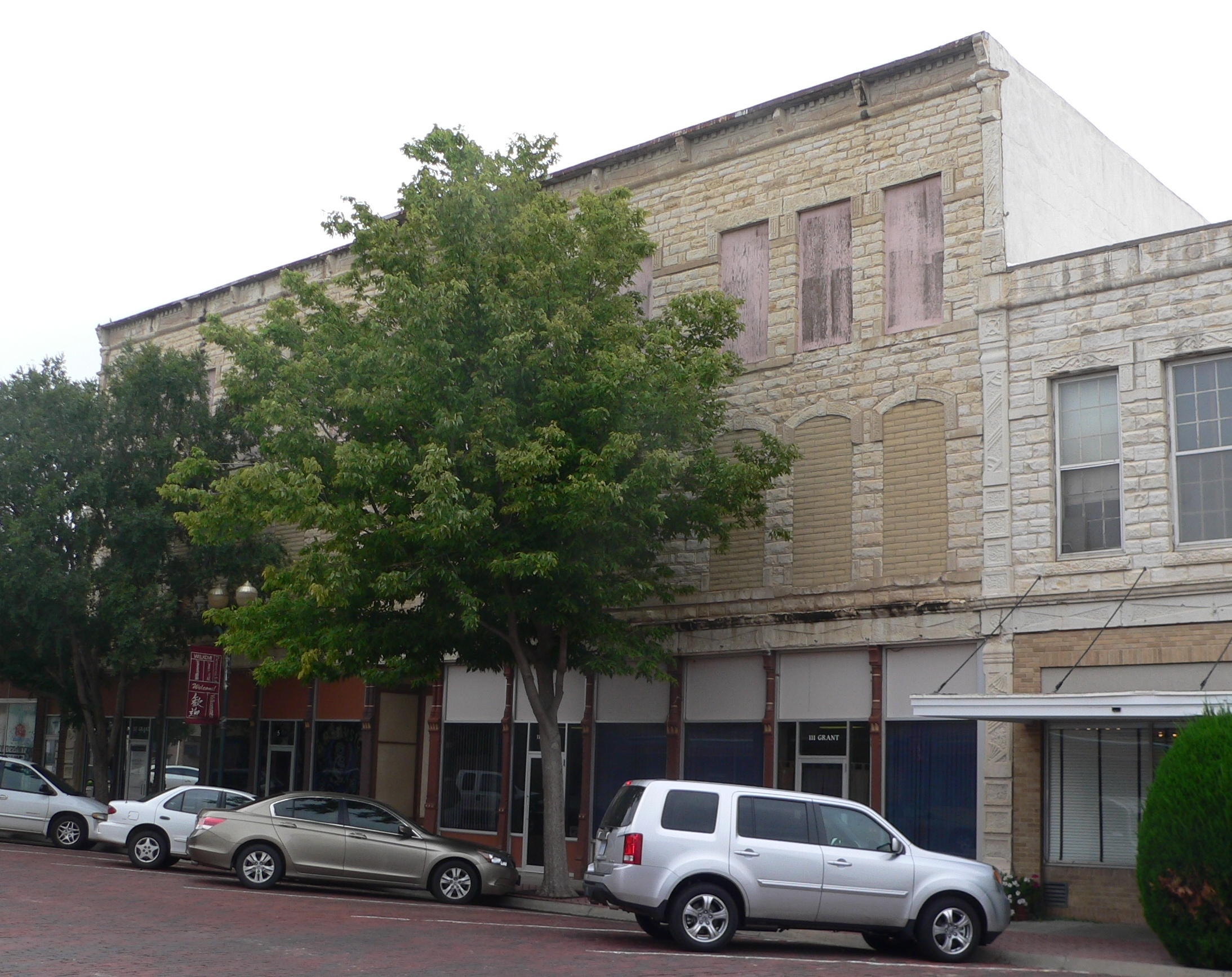
- The Buffalo Hotel in 2013

- Location within Kansas Location within the United States
- Location: 111–117 Grant Ave., Garden City, Kansas
- Coordinates: 37°58′03″N 100°52′28″W
- Area: less than one acre
- Built: 1886
- Architects: Stevens, J.H.; Thompson, C.L.
- Architectural style: Italianate
- NRHP reference No.: 07001480
- Added to NRHP: January 31, 2008

The Buffalo Hotel in Garden City, Kansas, was built in 1886. It was listed on the National Register of Historic Places in 2008.

It is a masonry building with limestone exterior. Its front, South-facing facade is 89 feet (27 m) wide and is divided into five bays. It was designed by architects J.H. Stevens and C.L. Thompson in Italianate style.

It was deemed significant "for its association with the early history of Garden City (pop. 28,451) and as a nineteenth century hotel, ...for its association with town founder and western legend Charles Jesse (Buffalo) Jones, and ...as an example of Italianate commercial architecture."
