= Lyle, Kansas =

Unincorporated community in Decatur County, Kansas

Coordinates: 39°57′28″N 100°12′59″W

Lyle is an unincorporated community in Decatur County, Kansas, United States.

== History ==
A post office was opened in Lyle in 1877, and remained in operation until it was discontinued in 1907.

== Education ==
The community is served by Oberlin USD 294 public school district.
