= Plymell, Kansas =

Unincorporated community in Finney County, Kansas

- Unincorporated community
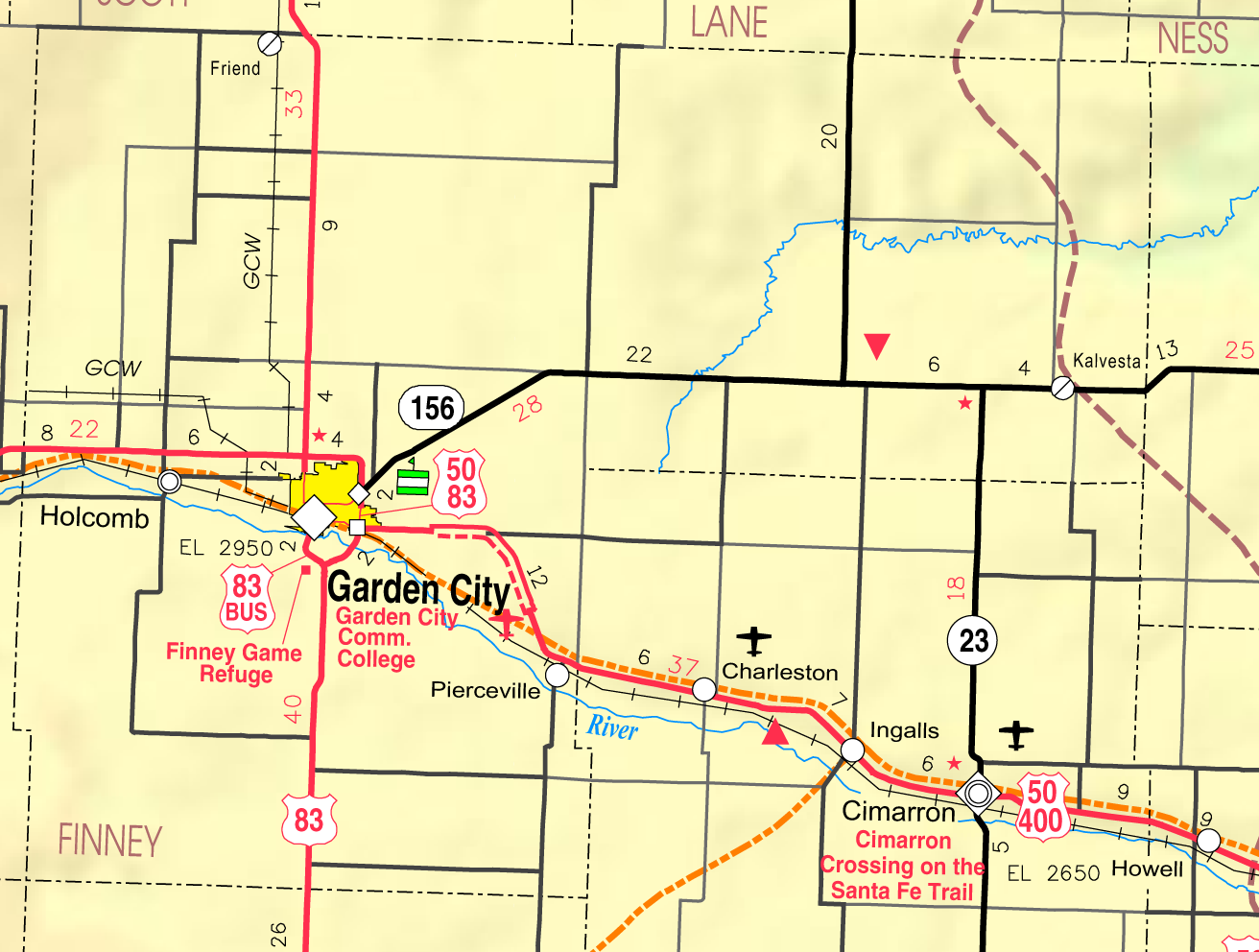
- KDOT map of Finney County (legend)

- Location within Kansas Location within the United States
- Coordinates: 37°48′35″N 100°52′12″W
- Country: United States
- State: Kansas
- County: Finney
- Elevation: 2,877 ft (877 m)
- Time zone: UTC-6 (CST)
  - Summer (DST): UTC-5 (CDT)
- Area code: 620
- FIPS code: 20-56875
- GNIS ID: 471647

Plymell is an unincorporated community in Finney County, Kansas, United States. It is located on U.S. Route 83, 11 miles (18 km) south of Garden City.

== History ==
A post office in Plymell was opened in 1886, closed in 1894, reopened in 1918, and closed permanently in 1925.

== Education ==
The community is served by Garden City USD 457 public school district.
