= Peterson, Kansas =

Unincorporated community in Finney County, Kansas

- Unincorporated community
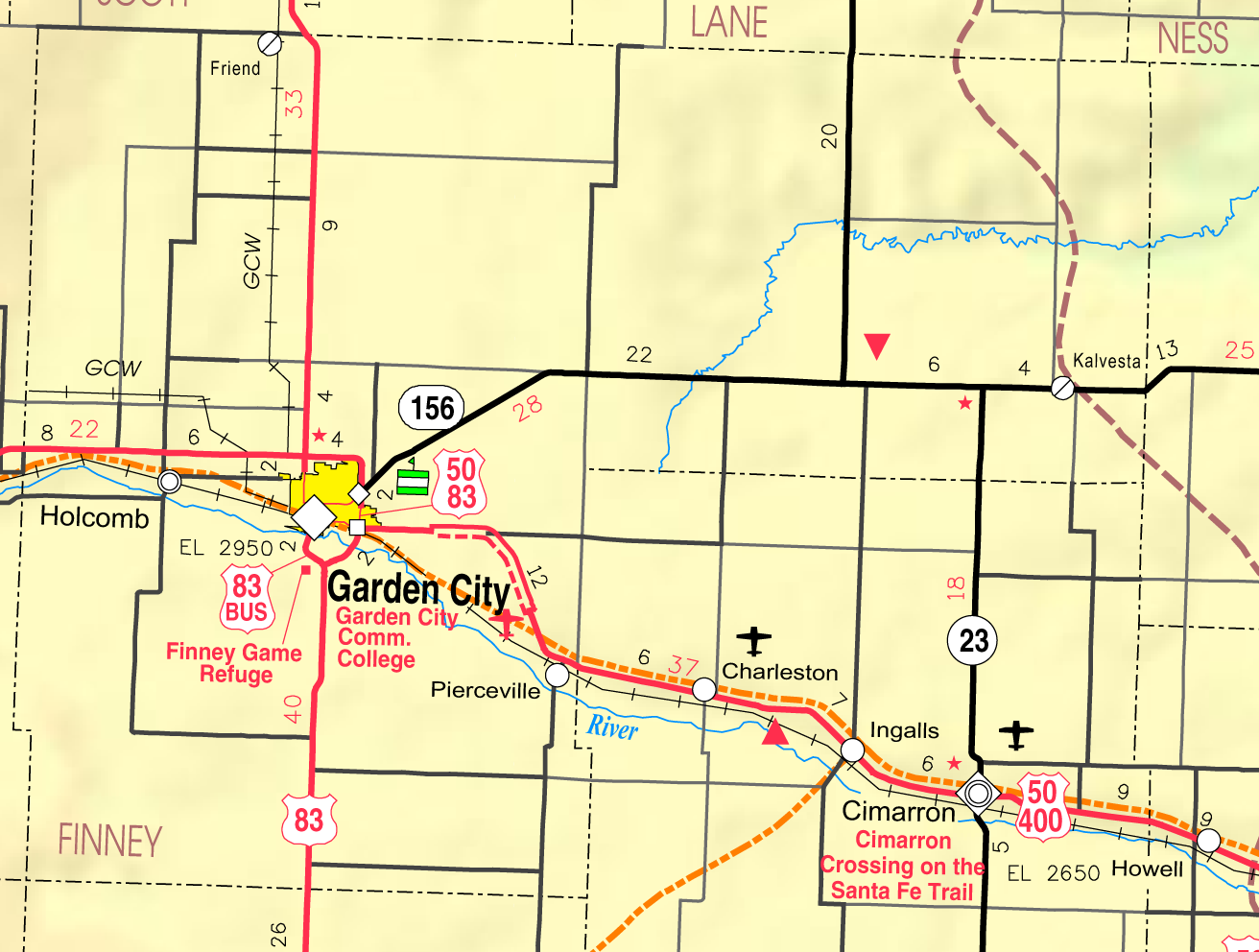
- KDOT map of Finney County (legend)

- Location within Kansas Location within the United States
- Coordinates: 38°01′57″N 101°04′02″W
- Country: United States
- State: Kansas
- County: Finney
- Elevation: 2,969 ft (905 m)
- Time zone: UTC-6 (CST)
  - Summer (DST): UTC-5 (CDT)
- Area code: 620
- FIPS code: 20-55575
- GNIS ID: 484569

Peterson is an unincorporated community in Finney County, Kansas, United States. It is 5 miles (8.0 km) northwest of Holcomb.
