= Lowe, Kansas =

Unincorporated community in Finney County, Kansas

- Unincorporated community
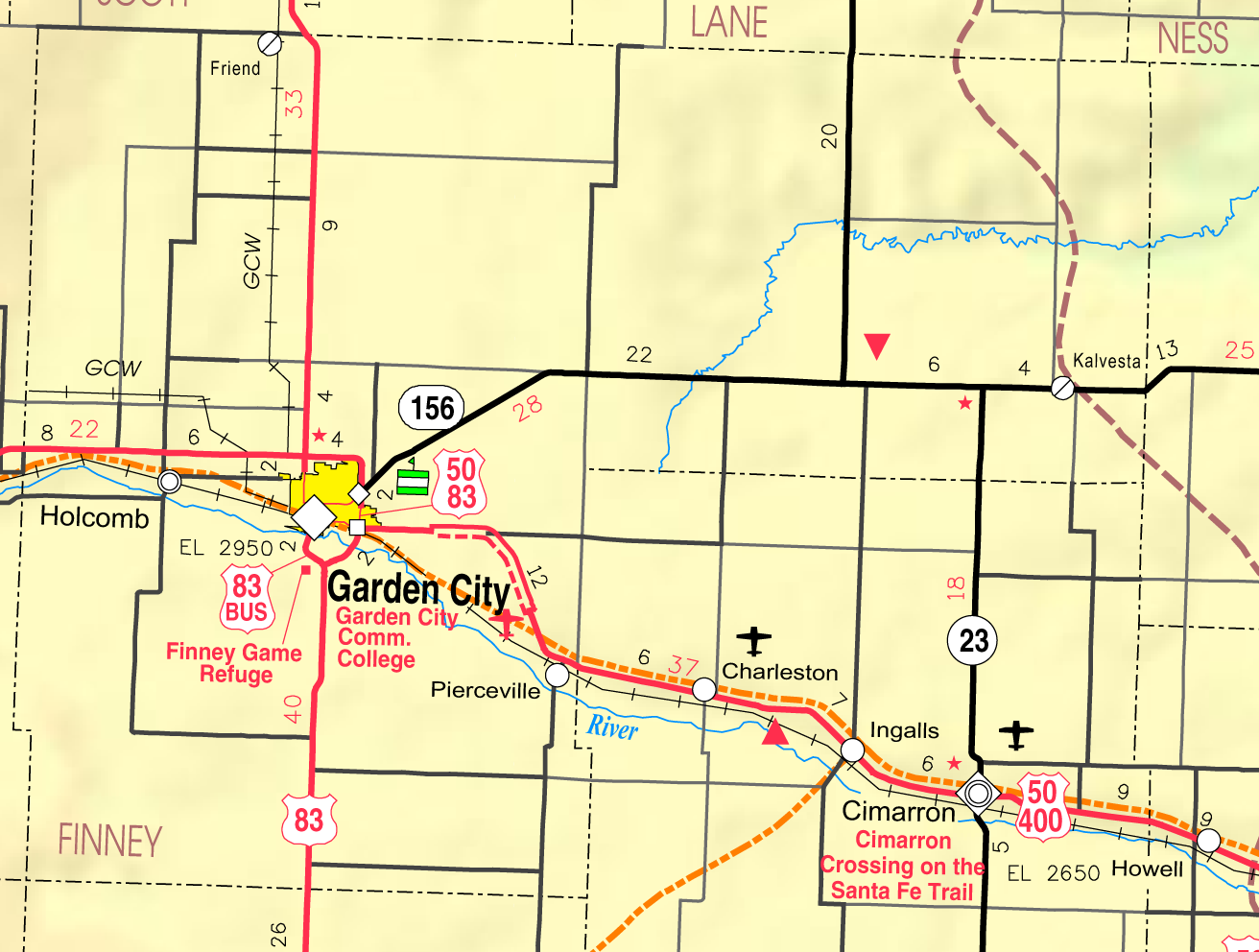
- KDOT map of Finney County (legend)

- Location within Kansas Location within the United States
- Coordinates: 38°01′59″N 100°59′34″W
- Country: United States
- State: Kansas
- County: Finney
- Elevation: 2,920 ft (890 m)
- Time zone: UTC-6 (CST)
  - Summer (DST): UTC-5 (CDT)
- Area code: 620
- FIPS code: 20-43000
- GNIS ID: 484571

Lowe is an unincorporated community in Finney County, Kansas, United States. It is 3 miles (4.8 km) north of Holcomb.
