= Westfall, Kansas =

Unincorporated community in Lincoln County, Kansas

Coordinates: 38°55′48″N 98°00′41″W

Westfall is an unincorporated community in Lincoln County, Kansas, United States.

== History ==
A post office was opened in Westfall in 1917, and remained in operation until it was discontinued in 1971.

== Education ==
The community is served by Lincoln USD 298 public school district.
