= Terry Township, Kansas =

Terry Township
- Township
- Location in Finney County
- Coordinates: 38°10′40″N 100°59′37″W
- Country: United States
- State: Kansas
- County: Finney

Area
  - Total: 143.4 sq mi (371.5 km^{2})
  - Land: 143.29 sq mi (371.11 km^{2})
  - Water: 0.15 sq mi (0.4 km^{2}) 0.11%
- Elevation: 2,907 ft (886 m)

Population (2020)
  - Total: 151
  - Density: 1.05/sq mi (0.407/km^{2})
- GNIS feature ID: 0471534

Terry Township is a township in Finney County, Kansas, United States. As of the 2020 census, its population was 151.

== Geography ==
Terry Township covers an area of 143.44 square miles (371.5 km^{2}) and contains no incorporated settlements.

== Transportation ==
Terry Township contains two airports or landing strips: Crist Airport and R J C Farms Incorporated Airport.
