= 900 Block North Seventh Street Historic District =

Historic district in Kansas, United States

- U.S. National Register of Historic Places
- U.S. Historic district
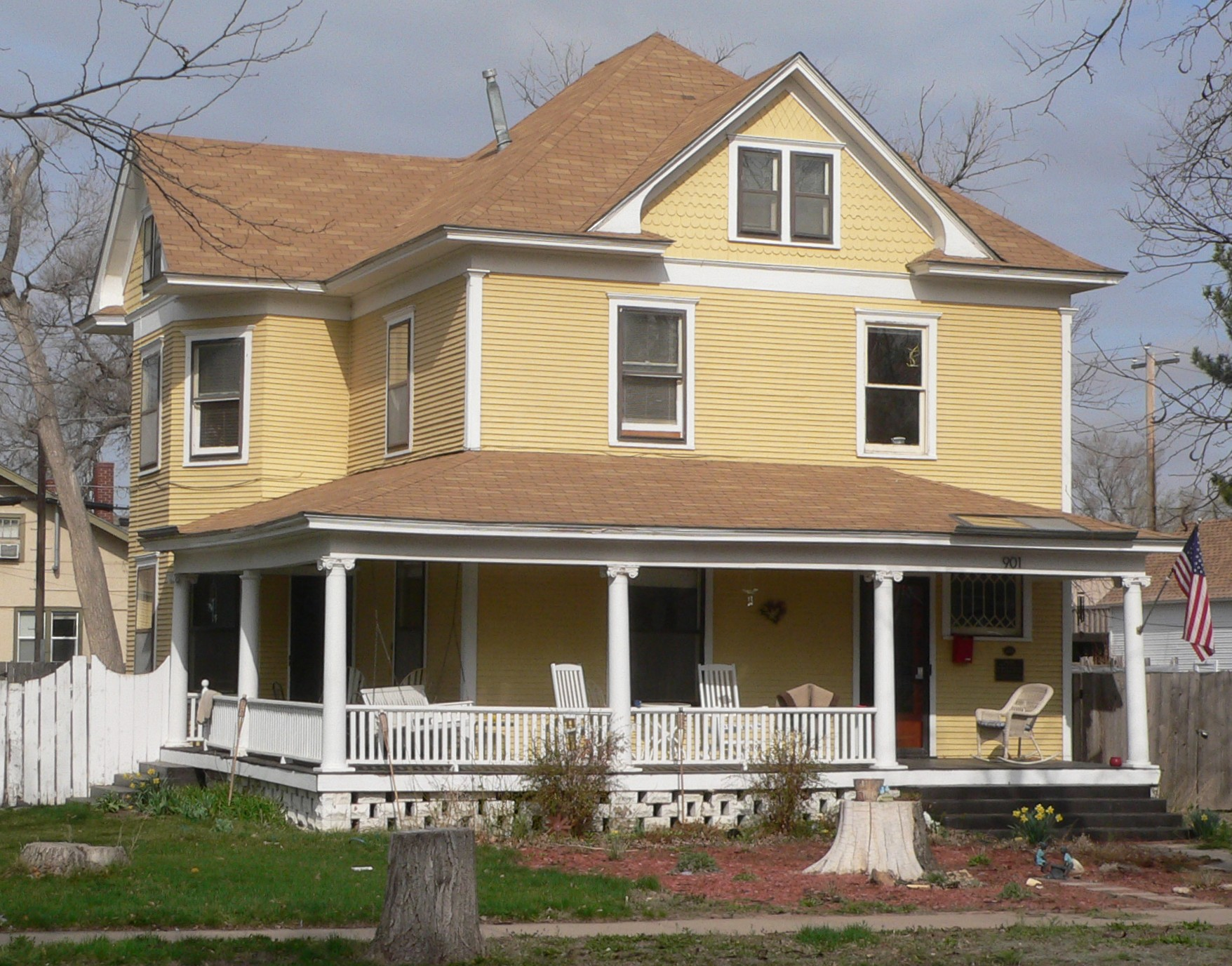

- Location within Kansas Location within the United States
- Location: 901,905,907,909,911 N. 7th St., Garden City, Kansas
- Coordinates: 37°58′23″N 100°52′12″W
- Area: less than one acre
- Built: c.1908-1917
- Architectural style: Queen Anne, Colonial Revival, Late 19th And 20th Century Revivals
- NRHP reference No.: 98001175
- Added to NRHP: September 18, 1998

900 Block North Seventh Street Historic District is a historic district which was listed on the National Register of Historic Places in 1998. Also known as Silk Stocking Row Historic District, the district included nine contributing buildings at 901, 905, 907, 909, and 911 N. 7th St. in Garden City, Kansas.

The street was known as "Silk Stocking Row" in the early 1900s. The district includes five houses, two barns, three garages, and a storage shed.
