= Kanona, Kansas =

Unincorporated community in Decatur County, Kansas

Coordinates: 39°47′48″N 100°23′24″W

Kanona is an unincorporated community in Decatur County, Kansas, United States.

== History ==
A post office was opened in Kanona in 1881, and remained in operation until it was discontinued in 1955. The post office was called Altory until 1887.

== Education ==
The community is served by Oberlin USD 294 public school district.
