= Pierceville Township, Kansas =

Pierceville Township
- Township
- Location in Finney County
- Coordinates: 37°55′00″N 100°43′12″W
- Country: United States
- State: Kansas
- County: Finney

Area
  - Total: 145.92 sq mi (377.94 km^{2})
  - Land: 145.9 sq mi (377.9 km^{2})
  - Water: 0.015 sq mi (0.04 km^{2}) 0.01%
- Elevation: 2,871 ft (875 m)

Population (2020)
  - Total: 459
  - Density: 3.15/sq mi (1.21/km^{2})
- GNIS feature ID: 0485282

Pierceville Township is a township in Finney County, Kansas, United States. As of the 2020 census, its population was 459.

== Geography ==
Pierceville Township covers an area of 145.92 square miles (377.9 km^{2}) and contains no incorporated settlements. According to the USGS, it contains one cemetery, Pierceville.

== Transportation ==
Pierceville Township contains two airports or landing strips: Finney Company Feedyard Incorporated Airport and Garden City Municipal Airport.
