= Pierceville, Kansas =

Unincorporated community in Finney County, Kansas

- Unincorporated community and CDP
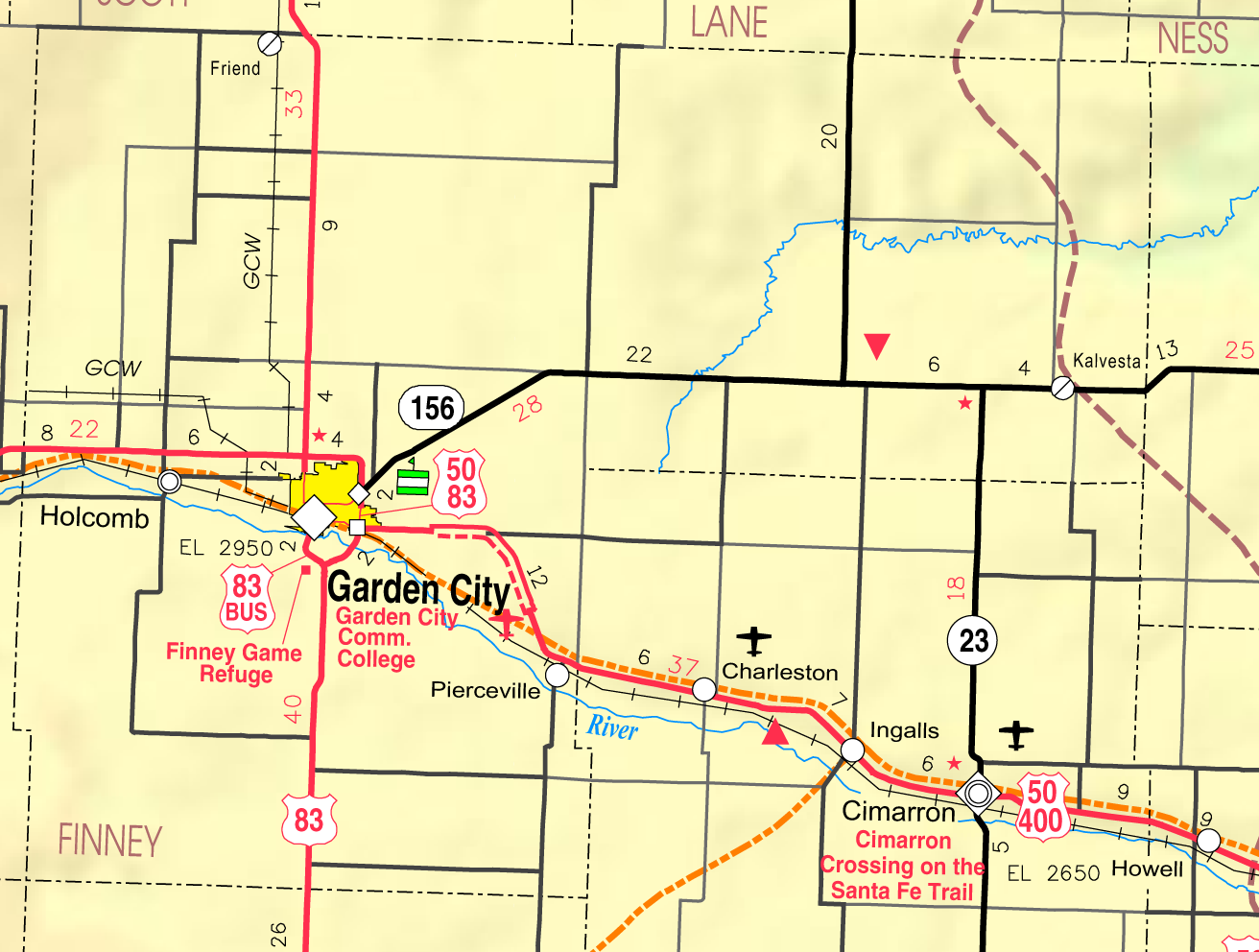
- KDOT map of Finney County (legend)

- Location within Kansas Location within the United States
- Coordinates: 37°52′42″N 100°40′37″W
- Country: United States
- State: Kansas
- County: Finney
- Named for: Chas. & Carlos Pierce
- Elevation: 2,749 ft (838 m)

Population (2020)
  - Total: 98
- Time zone: UTC-6 (CST)
  - Summer (DST): UTC-5 (CDT)
- ZIP Code: 67868
- Area code: 620
- FIPS code: 20-55775
- GNIS ID: 471624

Pierceville is an unincorporated community and census-designated place (CDP) in Finney County, Kansas, United States. As of the 2020 census, the population was 98. It is located along U.S. Routes 50 and 400, 12 miles (19 km) southeast of Garden City.

== History ==
The Western Trail (a cattle trail) played a part in the founding of this town. The Barton Brothers drove a herd of 3,000 cattle over the trail, and the cattle were the first to feed on the government lands in western Kansas. In the fall of 1872, they came to the area and established a ranch along the Arkansas River. The Atchison, Topeka and Santa Fe Railway was laying track in southwestern Kansas, and they chose the Barton Ranch as headquarters for the town site. It was named Pierceville in honor of Chas. W. and Carlos Pierce, who were members of the original Atchison & Topeka Railroad company.

The post office was established on June 10, 1873, and the town began to grow with a store and dugouts. Then tragedy struck on July 3, 1874. Indians who had been defeated in a fight in Texas were heading north and were looking for settlements along the Santa Fe Railroad. Once they got to Pierceville, they set fire to the store and chased the train that came through the town, firing their arrows at the train and into the windows. It was learned later that this was the same group of Indians who had attacked the German family and killed the parents, a son and a small child before kidnapping the four daughters. The girls were with the Indians during the attack on Pierceville but were rescued later.

It was not until 1878 that a house and a store were built and the post office was reestablished on July 24. The town was platted in 1886 and the population was 400. There was a newspaper, hotel and a hardware store. By 1930, the population was 166.

Pierceville had a post office with ZIP Code 67868, but it was disestablished April 11, 1992.

A few houses, a community building, an empty elementary school, a grain elevator, and a church are all that remain of the community.

== Geography ==
=== Climate ===
According to the Köppen Climate Classification system, Pierceville has a semi-arid climate, abbreviated "BSk" on climate maps.

== Demographics ==
Historical population
| Census | Pop. | Note | %± |
|---|---|---|---|
| 2020 | 98 | | — |
U.S. Decennial Census

The 2020 United States census counted 98 people, 31 households, and 26 families in Pierceville. The population density was 47.7 per square mile (18.4/km^{2}). There were 39 housing units at an average density of 19.0 per square mile (7.3/km^{2}). The racial makeup was 75.51% (74) white or European American (70.41% non-Hispanic white), 0.0% (0) black or African-American, 0.0% (0) Native American or Alaska Native, 0.0% (0) Asian, 0.0% (0) Pacific Islander or Native Hawaiian, 9.18% (9) from other races, and 15.31% (15) from two or more races. Hispanic or Latino of any race was 27.55% (27) of the population.

Of the 31 households, 48.4% had children under the age of 18; 48.4% were married couples living together; 22.6% had a female householder with no spouse or partner present. 12.9% of households consisted of individuals and 0.0% had someone living alone who was 65 years of age or older. The percent of those with a bachelor's degree or higher was estimated to be 0.0% of the population.

33.7% of the population was under the age of 18, 4.1% from 18 to 24, 21.4% from 25 to 44, 20.4% from 45 to 64, and 20.4% who were 65 years of age or older. The median age was 41.5 years. For every 100 females, there were 92.2 males. For every 100 females ages 18 and older, there were 85.7 males.

== Education ==
The community is served by Garden City USD 457 public school district.
