= Tornado outbreak and floods of May 23–26, 2015 =

Wind and rainstorm in the south-central United States and Mexico

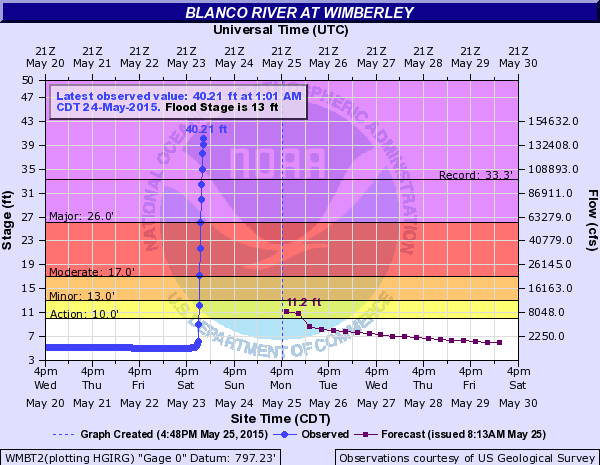
- Hydrograph of the Blanco River at Wimberley, Texas depicting the record flood event during the overnight of May 24–25

Meteorological history
- Duration: May 23–26, 2015

Tornado outbreak
- Tornadoes: 76
- Max. rating: EF3 tornado
- Duration: 2 days, 11 hours, 26 minutes
- Highest winds: Tornadic – 158–206 mph (254–332 km/h) (Ciudad Acuña, Mexico F3 on May 25)
- Highest gusts: Non-tornadic – 78 mph (126 km/h) near Poteau, Oklahoma
- Largest hail: 4.75 inches (12.1 cm) near Netawaka, Kansas on May 25

Flooding event
- Max. rainfall: 20 in (51 cm) in northern Texas

Overall effects
- Fatalities: 30 total (16 tornadic, 14 flooding)
- Missing: 11
- Damage: $3 billion (2015 USD)
- Areas affected: Mexico, Great Plains, Southern United States
- Part of the Tornadoes of 2015 and Floods in the United States during 2015

Preceded by more than a week of heavy rain, a slow-moving storm system dropped tremendous precipitation across much of Texas and Oklahoma during the nights of May 24–26, 2015, triggering record-breaking floods. Additionally, many areas reported tornado activity and lightning. Particularly hard hit were areas along the Blanco River in Hays County, Texas, where entire blocks of homes were leveled. On the morning of May 26, the National Weather Service issued a flash flood emergency for southwest Harris County (which includes the city of Houston) and northeast Fort Bend County. The system also produced deadly tornadoes in parts of Mexico, Texas, and Oklahoma. This flood significantly contributed to the wettest month ever for Texas and Oklahoma.

== Meteorological synopsis ==
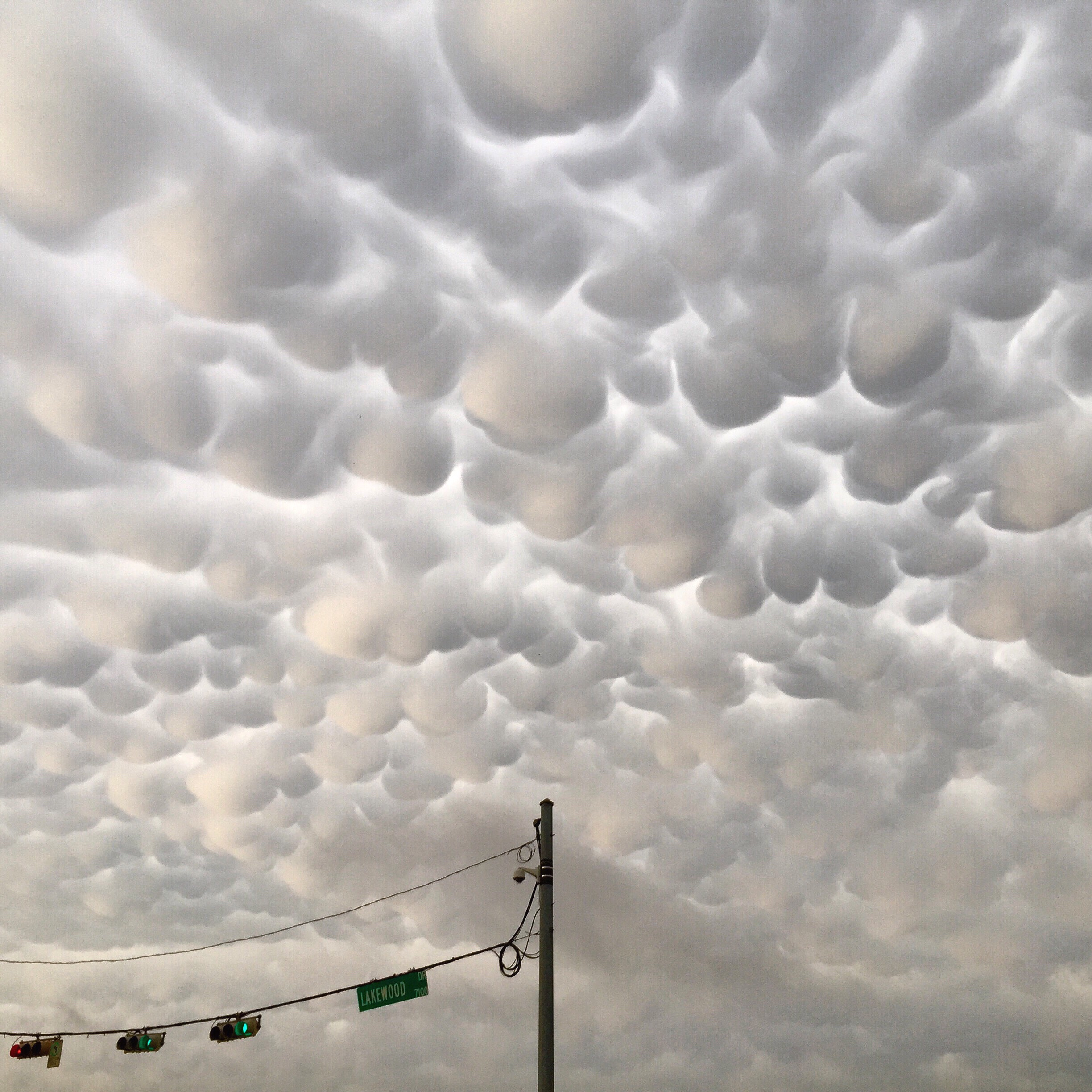
Mammatus clouds formed over Bull Creek park after wave of Memorial Day storms in Austin, May 25, 2015.

According to Bob Henson from Wunderground, inflow of low-level moisture from the Gulf of Mexico and the combination of very slow moving large-scale storm systems set the stage for the floods. He added,"Upper-level winds were largely aligned with the low-level frontal zone, an ideal setup for “thunderstorm training” (successive downpours over the same area). In addition, rains were concentrated by several mesoscale convective vortices, small-scale centers of low-pressure that developed along the frontal bands, in some cases resembling mini-tropical cyclones." The stationary trough during May is linked to both the El Niño and amplified midlatitude short-wave train.

The system also produced numerous tornadoes across the Great Plains on May 23 and 24. Most of these tornadoes were weak, though EF2 tornadoes caused considerable damage near New Boston, Illinois, and Ensign, Kansas. In Texas, EF1 tornadoes impacted mainly residential areas of Dallas, Houston, and Corpus Christi as well. In the early morning hours of May 25, a destructive tornado struck the Mexican border city of Ciudad Acuña, Coahuila; it was the first tornado to strike the city in its history. Numerous cars and buses were thrown and mangled, and 750 properties were damaged or completely destroyed. Several masonry construction homes along the path were completely leveled. 14 fatalities occurred as a result, and an additional 229 residents were injured. The tornado was officially rated F3, though some sources list it as an F4. Additional tornadoes, a few of which were strong, touched down in Texas later throughout the day. This included an EF2 that killed one person near Cameron, Texas. Another EF2 tornado struck Henderson, causing considerable damage in town. In Oklahoma, an EF2 tornado caused heavy damage near the towns of Wister and Panama, while an EF3 tornado killed one person near Blue. Overall, the outbreak produced 75 tornadoes and killed 16 people, making it the deadliest North American tornado outbreak of 2015. This is the largest tornado outbreak in Central Texas history.

== Confirmed tornadoes ==
Confirmed tornadoes by Enhanced Fujita rating
EFU	EF0	EF1	EF2	EF3	EF4	EF5	Total
0	28	39	7	2*	0	0	76

- Note: One tornado in Mexico was rated F3 but is listed as EF3 in the above table.

=== May 23 event ===
List of confirmed tornadoes – Saturday, May 23, 2015 (Note: All dates are based on the local time zone where the tornado touched down; however, all times are in Coordinated Universal Time for consistency.)
EF#	Location	County / Parish	State	Start Coord.	Time (UTC)	Path length	Max width	Damage (2015 USD)
EF0	WSW of Bosler	Albany	WY	41.5357°N 105.843°W	1855 – 1900	0.3 mi (0.48 km)	35 yd (32 m)	$0
EF0	Tornado remained over open country, causing no damage.							
EF0	N of Pocasset	Grady	OK	35.19°N 98.0031°W	2212 – 2232	6 mi (9.7 km)	500 yd (460 m)	$0
EF0	Four houses were damaged by this tornado.							
EF0	N of Sulphur (1st tornado)	Murray	OK	34.5245°N 96.97°W	2259 – 2307	3 mi (4.8 km)	40 yd (37 m)	$0
EF0	Tornado damaged a workshop building.							
EF0	SE of Ada	Pontotoc	OK	—N/a	2305	0.2 mi (0.32 km)	20 yd (18 m)	$0
EF0	Brief tornado remained over open country, causing no damage.							
EF0	N of Sulphur (2nd tornado)	Murray	OK	—N/a	2310 – 2311	0.5 mi (0.80 km)	50 yd (46 m)	$0
EF0	Brief tornado remained over open country, causing no damage.							
EF1	E of Blanchard	McClain	OK	—N/a	2311 – 2317	2 mi (3.2 km)	50 yd (46 m)	$0
EF1	Ten homes were damaged by this large tornado.							
EF0	S of Stratford	Garvin	OK	—N/a	2316	0.2 mi (0.32 km)	50 yd (46 m)	$0
EF0	Brief tornado remained over open country, causing no damage.							
EF1	NE of Francis	Pontotoc, Seminole	OK	—N/a	2325 – 2333	3.75 mi (6.04 km)	100 yd (91 m)	$0
EF1	Tornado caused significant tree damage along its path.							
EF0	WSW of Newcastle	McClain	OK	—N/a	2330 – 2332	0.5 mi (0.80 km)	50 yd (46 m)	$0
EF0	Tornado remained over open country causing no damage.							
EF1	SE of Maysville	Garvin	OK	—N/a	0005	0.5 mi (0.80 km)	50 yd (46 m)	$0
EF1	A barn was destroyed by this brief tornado.							
EF0	N of Holdenville	Hughes	OK	—N/a	0013	0.2 mi (0.32 km)	50 yd (46 m)	$0
EF0	Brief tornado remained over open country, causing no damage.							
EF1	SSW of Balcones Heights	Bexar	TX	29.4430°N 98.575°W	0116 – 0117	0.4 mi (0.64 km)	150 yd (140 m)	Unknown
EF1	One home sustained major damage to its roof, and additional residences nearby sustained generally minor damage to their roofs and vehicles. A home's carport had its roof removed and displaced two blocks to the north. Trees were damaged.							
EF0	SE of Panola	Latimer	OK	34.8785°N 95.1722°W	0144 – 0147	1.6 mi (2.6 km)	75 yd (69 m)	$0
EF0	Large tree limbs were snapped by this weak tornado.							
EF0	SE of Dripping Springs	Hays	TX	30.1269°N 98.0909°W	0153 – 0200	5.8 mi (9.3 km)	100 yd (91 m)	Unknown
EF0	Approximately 15 homes and numerous trees were damaged along the path.							
EF1	NNW of Jonestown	Travis	TX	30.5465°N 97.9708°W	0158 – 0200	1.3 mi (2.1 km)	200 yd (180 m)	Unknown
EF1	A residence sustained roof and exterior wall damage as its front and back porches were destroyed.							
EF0	Hays	Travis	TX	30.1533°N 97.8694°W	0211 – 0213	2.5 mi (4.0 km)	200 yd (180 m)	Unknown
EF0	Significant tree damage and minor roof damage was observed in Hays.							
EF1	N of Liberty Hill	Williamson	TX	30.6909°N 97.9411°W	0222 – 0234	3.1 mi (5.0 km)	200 yd (180 m)	Unknown
EF1	Damage was largely confined to large oak trees. Seven to ten homes sustained damage mainly to their roofs, the most substantial instance being the complete less of a chimney. A barn had part of its roof ripped off.							
EF0	NE of Jonestown	Travis, Williamson	TX	30.5155°N 97.8883°W	0237 – 0238	1.2 mi (1.9 km)	125 yd (114 m)	Unknown
EF0	Damage to trees and a school occurred.							
EF1	Wells Branch	Travis	TX	30.365°N 97.685°W	0239 – 0242	0.6 mi (0.97 km)	250 yd (230 m)	Unknown
EF1	A business in town had its sheet metal roofing peeled back, and a stone brick sign was demolished. At an apartment complex, roofing shingles were damaged, large tree limbs were snapped, and a garbage dumpster was tossed. The second floor of a storage facility had its metal roof and walls collapsed. The tornado lifted and tossed 10 small moving trailers. Several power poles were blown over and additional tree limbs were snapped.							
EF1	N of Wyldwood	Bastrop	TX	30.1692°N 97.494°W	0243 – 0244	0.8 mi (1.3 km)	200 yd (180 m)	Unknown
EF1	Several trees were uprooted, with several oaks sustaining substantial damage. Roof damage occurred at a residence.							
EF0	WSW of Andice	Williamson	TX	30.7665°N 97.925°W	0247	0.25 mi (0.40 km)	50 yd (46 m)	Unknown
EF0	Tree and minor roof damage occurred along the path.							
EF1	NE of Leander	Williamson	TX	30.611°N 97.805°W	0247 – 0250	0.5 mi (0.80 km)	150 yd (140 m)	Unknown
EF1	Large tree limbs were snapped. Two homes sustained damage: one had a small portion of its roofing decking removed, while the second had over half of its roofing decking removed. Two large storage sheds were moved 20 yd (18 m).							

=== May 24 event ===
List of confirmed tornadoes – Sunday, May 24, 2015
EF#	Location	County / Parish	State	Start Coord.	Time (UTC)	Path length	Max width	Damage (2015 USD)
EF1	Western Corpus Christi	Nueces	TX	—N/a	0627 – 0630	2.62 mi (4.22 km)	100 yd (91 m)	$750,000
EF1	Numerous trees were snapped or uprooted, some of which fell on houses and vehicles. A flower nursery and a grocery store were damaged, and a baseball dugout was destroyed. Several residences sustained minor to moderate roof and siding damage as well.							
EF1	Northern Irving	Dallas	TX	—N/a	0734 – 0736	1.13 mi (1.82 km)	80 yd (73 m)	$600,000
EF1	Several trees, two high rise buildings, and several carports were damaged.							
EF1	Northwestern Dallas	Dallas	TX	—N/a	0734 – 0737	4.91 mi (7.90 km)	40 yd (37 m)	$100,000
EF1	Trees and power lines were damaged. An apartment complex and several warehouse buildings sustained roof damage.							
EF1	Southwestern Houston	Harris	TX	29.674°N 95.528°W	1133 – 1138	0.5 mi (0.80 km)	50 yd (46 m)	$200,000
EF1	Ten structures at an apartment complex sustained roof damage, including one with complete roof removal and interior wall damage. A twelve-story glass facade building had several of its north-facing windows blown out.							
EF1	S of Marshall	Harrison	TX	32.3588°N 94.3589°W	1634 – 1636	1.89 mi (3.04 km)	128 yd (117 m)	$75,000
EF1	Trees were snapped or uprooted. A house sustained roof damage when its carport was lifted, a small outbuilding was destroyed, and a warehouse sustained roof damage.							
EF1	E of Marshall	Harrison	TX	32.4719°N 94.3364°W	1646 – 1700	9.52 mi (15.32 km)	201 yd (184 m)	Unknown
EF1	Damage was largely confined to snapped or uprooted trees, some of which damaged structures and vehicles.							
EF1	E of Lowry City	St. Clair	MO	38.1052°N 93.712°W	1715 – 1720	4.63 mi (7.45 km)	200 yd (180 m)	Unknown
EF1	Several outbuildings and two homes were severely damaged, and numerous trees were damaged or uprooted.							
EF1	ESE of St. Paul	Lee	IA	40.7551°N 91.4801°W	2242	0.1 mi (0.16 km)	25 yd (23 m)	$10,000
EF1	A barn and a grain bin were destroyed, a couple of chimneys were damaged, and some trees and a power line were downed.							
EF0	W of Merriman(1st tornado)	Cherry	NE	42.92°N 101.9965°W	2245	0.1 mi (0.16 km)	20 yd (18 m)	$0
EF0	Brief landspout tornado remained over open rangeland, causing no damage.							
EF0	W of Merriman(2nd tornado)	Cherry	NE	42.92°N 101.9925°W	2245	0.1 mi (0.16 km)	20 yd (18 m)	$0
EF0	Law enforcement reported a brief landspout tornado in open rangeland.							
EF1	W of Theodosia	Ozark	MO	36.5859°N 92.7058°W	2259 – 2308	4.5 mi (7.2 km)	200 yd (180 m)	Unknown
EF1	A tornado damaged or destroyed three barns, caused minor damage to a mobile home, and snapped or uprooted hundreds of trees.							
EF2	N of New Boston	Mercer	IL	41.2527°N 90.9854°W	2350 – 0000	6.75 mi (10.86 km)	50 yd (46 m)	$30,000
EF2	A large machine shed and two garages were completely destroyed, and a house had a portion of its roof ripped off. Additional trees and outbuildings were damaged.							
EF1	NNE of Kismet to N of Plains	Seward, Meade	KS	37.2318°N 100.6849°W	0237 – 0321	10.87 mi (17.49 km)	1,200 yd (1,100 m)	$1,000,000
EF1	Irrigation pivots were damaged by this large wedge tornado.							
EF0	W of Hayne	Seward	KS	37.0975°N 100.818°W	0247 – 0249	0.71 mi (1.14 km)	150 yd (140 m)	$0
EF0	Tornado remained over open country causing no damage.							
EF0	NE of Plains	Meade	KS	37.3006°N 100.539°W	0306 – 0314	2.4 mi (3.9 km)	100 yd (91 m)	$0
EF0	Tornado remained over open country, causing no damage.							
EF0	N of Plains	Meade	KS	37.3399°N 100.5342°W	0320 – 0334	3.1 mi (5.0 km)	100 yd (91 m)	$0
EF0	Tornado remained over open country, causing no damage.							
EF1	NNE of Plains to SE of Montezuma	Meade, Gray	KS	37.4104°N 100.4592°W	0347 – 0430	13.2 mi (21.2 km)	800 yd (730 m)	Unknown
EF1	Numerous pivot irrigation sprinklers were damaged by this large wedge tornado.							
EF2	SW of Dodge City	Meade, Ford	KS	37.5337°N 100.3193°W	0426 – 0515	14.62 mi (23.53 km)	250 yd (230 m)	Unknown
EF2	High voltage transmission lines and poles, pivot irrigation sprinklers, trees, and a home were damaged by this large wedge tornado. The home had a large stock trailer thrown into it. A car was tossed 100 yd (91 m) to the northeast.							

=== May 25 event ===
List of confirmed tornadoes – Monday, May 25, 2015
EF#	Location	County / Parish	State	Start Coord.	Time (UTC)	Path length	Max width	Damage (2015 USD)
EF1	S of Dodge City	Ford	KS	37.6688°N 100.0987°W	0520 – 0532	6.43 mi (10.35 km)	75 yd (69 m)	Unknown
EF1	A few pivot irrigation sprinklers, trees, and a home were damaged.							
EF1	Kenner	Jefferson	LA	29.97°N 90.25°W	0622	Unknown	75–100 yd (69–91 m)	Unknown
EF1	One building in Kenner suffered structural damage as of result of this tornado which also damaged trees and took down power lines.							
F3	Ciudad Acuña	Acuña	COA	—N/a	~1130	Unknown	Unknown	Unknown
F3	14 deaths – A large tornado struck a densely populated subdivision in Ciudad Acuña, near the Mexico–United States border, causing extensive damage. Cars and buses were thrown and mangled, and numerous masonry homes were damaged, with a few that were leveled. 750 structures were damaged or destroyed and more than 200 people were injured. May have been an F4 according to some sources.							
EF0	WSW of Amory	Monroe	MS	33.9464°N 88.635°W	1341 – 1347	4.3 mi (6.9 km)	70 yd (64 m)	Unknown
EF0	Trees were snapped or uprooted, some of which damaged the roof of several homes.							
EF1	Amory	Monroe	MS	33.9816°N 88.4885°W	1351 – 1357	2.5 mi (4.0 km)	150 yd (140 m)	Unknown
EF1	Numerous trees in town were snapped or uprooted, some of which damaged the roofs of homes, carports, and storage sheds, and power poles were bent. A few homes had areas of shingles removed.							
EF1	S of Loraine	Mitchell	TX	32.3994°N 100.7172°W	1400 – 1401	0.16 mi (0.26 km)	50 yd (46 m)	$40,000
EF1	A barn had several of its walls collapsed and a pole with a cement base pulled out of the ground. Debris from the barn was impaled through a nearby house.							
EF0	NNE of Sweetwater	Fisher	TX	32.54°N 100.4°W	1445 – 1448	1.06 mi (1.71 km)	40 yd (37 m)	$0
EF0	The public observed a tornado along Texas State Highway 70. It remained over open country and caused no damage.							
EF0	W of Louisville	Winston	MS	33.1054°N 89.1826°W	1519 – 1521	0.94 mi (1.51 km)	25 yd (23 m)	$20,000
EF0	Multiple trees were uprooted and multiple large branches were downed. A small boat was lofted several yards.							
EF0	Fort Lauderdale Beach	Broward	FL	26.1122°N 80.1041°W	1600 – 1601	0.06 mi (0.097 km)	10 yd (9.1 m)	$0
EF0	A waterspout moved ashore Fort Lauderdale Beach, causing four injuries when an inflatable bounce house was lofted into the air.							
EF1	Marshall	Harrison	TX	32.4719°N 94.3364°W	1646 – 1700	9.54 mi (15.35 km)	201 yd (184 m)	$300,000
EF1	Numerous trees and power lines were downed, and falling trees damaged several homes in town.							
EF1	E of Fredericksburg	Gillespie	TX	30.2462°N 98.8038°W	1733 – 1736	2.4 mi (3.9 km)	100 yd (91 m)	Unknown
EF1	A water pump station lost its roof and a brick wall; additional damage was largely confined to trees.							
EF0	NW of Johnson City	Blanco	TX	30.3375°N 98.4931°W	1804 – 1809	4.9 mi (7.9 km)	200 yd (180 m)	Unknown
EF0	Numerous trees and two barns were damaged.							
EF1	NE of Lampasas	Lampasas	TX	—N/a	1841 – 1842	0.42 mi (0.68 km)	90 yd (82 m)	$35,000
EF1	Several trees were damaged and a home had a large portion of its roof ripped off.							
EF1	N of Kempner	Lampasas	TX	—N/a	1842 – 1845	1.53 mi (2.46 km)	180 yd (160 m)	$85,000
EF1	Several buildings were damaged, including two houses that had a majority of their roofs removed.							
EF1	NNW of Copperas Cove	Coryell	TX	—N/a	1906 – 1914	5.66 mi (9.11 km)	600 yd (550 m)	$90,000
EF1	All but one tree at a historic cemetery was damaged and/or uprooted. Six homes were damaged, one of which had roofing material removed.							
EF0	Eastern Sherman	Grayson	TX	—N/a	1925 – 1928	1.71 mi (2.75 km)	30 yd (27 m)	$20,000
EF0	A tornado produced minimal damage over open construction areas.							
EF3	WSW of Blue to E of Caney	Bryan, Atoka	OK	—N/a	1942 – 2020	18.8 mi (30.3 km)	700 yd (640 m)	$0
EF3	1 death – A few houses and mobile homes were completely destroyed while other houses were damaged, some significantly. The fatality occurred when a mobile home was completely destroyed.							
EF2	NNW of Bentley	Atoka	OK	—N/a	2029 – 2041	8 mi (13 km)	1,000 yd (910 m)	$0
EF2	Trees were uprooted and a number of houses were damaged.							
EF0	NE of Duplex	Fannin	TX	—N/a	2041 – 2043	2.43 mi (3.91 km)	100 yd (91 m)	$65,000
EF0	Several trees were damaged or uprooted. The roof of a church and two homes were damaged.							
EF0	near Kirvin	Freestone	TX	—N/a	2055 – 2056	0.33 mi (0.53 km)	25 yd (23 m)	$5,000
EF0	A brief tornado produced minor crop damage.							
EF2	W of Cameron	Milam	TX	—N/a	2055 – 2105	8.88 mi (14.29 km)	400 yd (370 m)	$760,000
EF2	1 death – Approximately 12 houses, mobile homes, or farm buildings were damaged or destroyed. Multiple trees were damaged as well. Fatality occurred when a manufactured home was completely destroyed.							
EF1	NE of Atoka	Atoka	OK	—N/a	2106 – 2108	1 mi (1.6 km)	400 yd (370 m)	$0
EF1	Emergency management and trained storm spotters observed a tornado.							
EF1	W of Cedar Creek	Bastrop	TX	30.085°N 97.542°W	2124 – 2133	3 mi (4.8 km)	440 yd (400 m)	Unknown
EF1	Many trees were snapped or uprooted. A few barns and a greenhouse were destroyed, and 12 homes were damaged. One person was critically injured.							
EF2	ESE of Clayton to SSW of Talihina	Pushmataha, Latimer	OK	34.552°N 95.2235°W	2152 – 2212	13.3 mi (21.4 km)	1,000 yd (910 m)	$45,000
EF2	An outbuilding was destroyed and several homes were damaged. Power poles were downed and numerous trees were snapped or uprooted.							
EF1	E of Whitesboro	Le Flore	OK	34.6469°N 94.8628°W	2217 – 2225	6.4 mi (10.3 km)	600 yd (550 m)	$10,000
EF1	Numerous trees were snapped or uprooted and power poles were blown down.							
EF1	NE of Fanshawe	Le Flore	OK	34.9734°N 94.8709°W	2234 – 2249	7.5 mi (12.1 km)	250 yd (230 m)	$0
EF1	Numerous trees were snapped.							
EF2	ENE of Wister to NW of Panama	Le Flore	OK	34.9835°N 94.6658°W	2248 – 2307	15.5 mi (24.9 km)	1,700 yd (1,600 m)	$500,000
EF2	At least two mobile homes were destroyed; other barns and outbuildings were also destroyed. Several homes were severely damaged while a number of others sustained roof damage. A cellular communication tower was partially collapsed, power poles were downed, and numerous trees were snapped or uprooted.							
EF1	SE of Ola	Yell	AR	—N/a	2335 – 2336	0.43 mi (0.69 km)	100 yd (91 m)	$5,000
EF1	Some trees and power lines were downed.							
EF1	E of Ola	Yell	AR	—N/a	2340 – 2344	1.91 mi (3.07 km)	250 yd (230 m)	$300,000
EF1	A home, some chicken houses, and several outbuildings were damaged; one chicken house was destroyed. Some trees and power lines were downed.							
EF0	SE of Floresville	Wilson	TX	29.099°N 98.13°W	2310 – 2314	1 mi (1.6 km)	50 yd (46 m)	Unknown
EF0	A carport awning to a business was ripped off and a few tree limbs were downed.							
EF1	WNW of Swiss Alp	Fayette	TX	29.787°N 96.951°W	2316 – 2324	4 mi (6.4 km)	100 yd (91 m)	Unknown
EF1	Two homes sustained substantial roof damage, multiple barns sustained roof damage, a few small outbuildings were destroyed, and several trees were snapped at their trunks.							
EF2	Henderson	Rusk	TX	32.1177°N 94.9438°W	2347 – 0006	19.45 mi (31.30 km)	600 yd (550 m)	$250,000
EF2	Numerous trees were snapped or uprooted, several power poles were snapped, and several homes sustained minor to moderate damage in and around town.							
EF0	W of Pandora	Wilson	TX	29.247°N 97.874°W	2357 – 0002	1.75 mi (2.82 km)	150 yd (140 m)	Unknown
EF0	Crops were damaged, a few trees were uprooted and several large limbs were snapped, a mobile home had its skirting damaged and the tin roof to a patio cover peeled off, a metal carport was collapsed, a residence sustained shingle damage, and a small barn was heavily damaged.							
EF1	SSW of Beckville to NE of DeBerry	Panola	TX	32.24°N 94.4566°W	0018 – 0043	21.6 mi (34.8 km)	1,251 yd (1,144 m)	$600,000
EF1	Trees were snapped or uprooted, several of which damaged homes upon falling, and outbuildings sustained some damage.							
EF1	SE of Shreveport	Caddo	LA	32.3891°N 93.7903°W	0112 – 0113	0.43 mi (0.69 km)	91 yd (83 m)	$500,000
EF1	Trees were snapped or uprooted, several of which caused major damage to homes upon falling.							

=== May 26 event ===
List of confirmed tornadoes – Tuesday, May 26, 2015
EF#	Location	County / Parish	State	Start Coord.	Time (UTC)	Path length	Max width	Damage (2015 USD)
EF1	Kenner	Jefferson	LA	29.9718°N 90.2467°W	0622 – 0623	0.37 mi (0.60 km)	100 yd (91 m)	Unknown
EF1	Hardwood trees were snapped, homes and a business sustained structural damage, and a single family home had its roof peeled back.							

== Flooding ==
On May 14, 2015, prior to extensive flooding beginning around May 24, flash flood warnings were issued for counties in South East Texas. At least 14 people were killed, including 10 in Texas and 4 in Oklahoma, and another 11 remain missing.

=== Texas ===
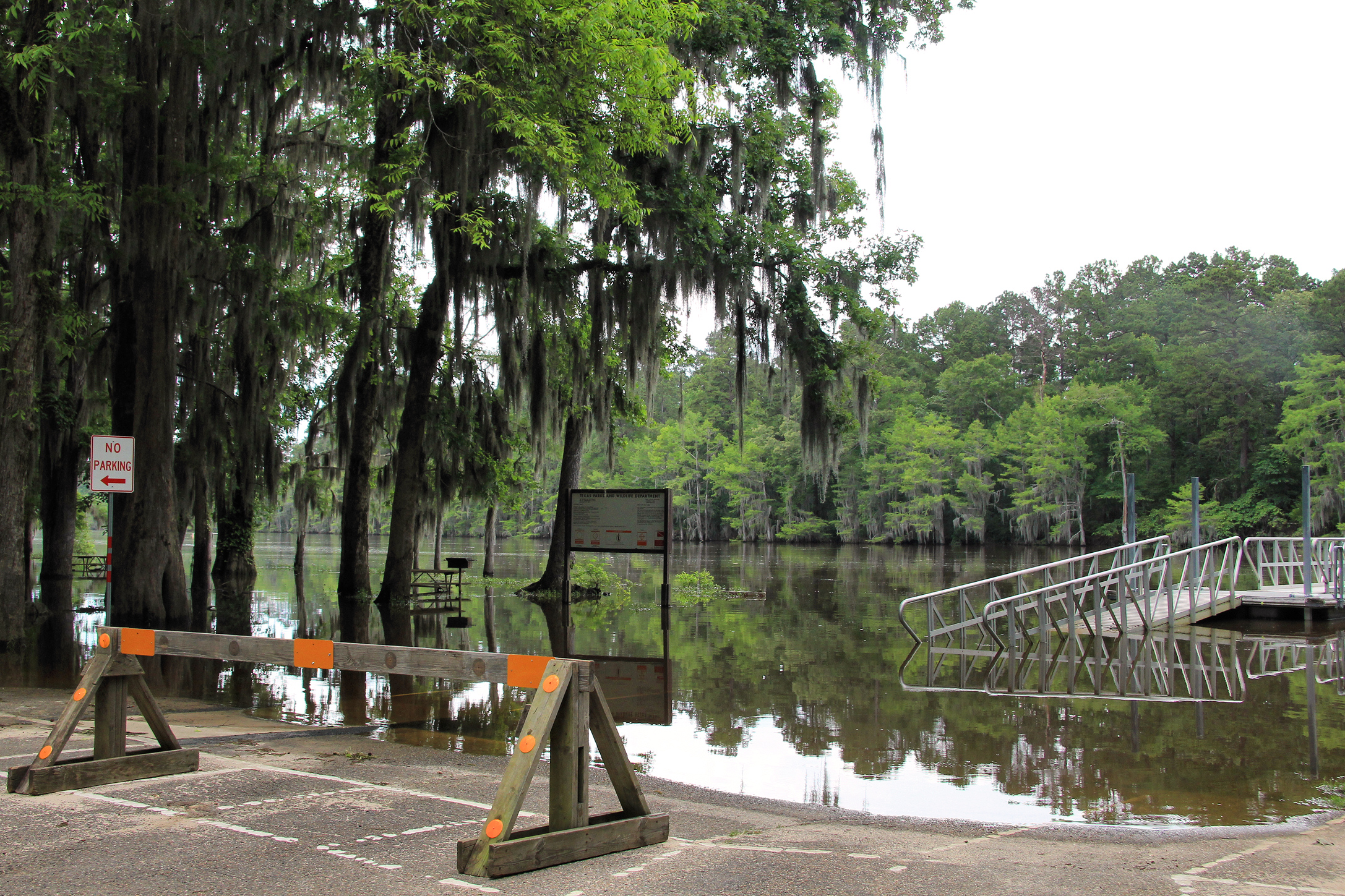
Boat ramp and pier flooded at Caddo Lake State Park

Flooding along the Wichita River prompted evacuations of 390 homes in Wichita Falls. Projections from the National Weather Service indicated that the river would reach a record crest of 25.5 ft (7.8 m) on May 26. Up to 100,000 customers were without power.

Wichita Falls and Corpus Christi broke their previous records for all-time wettest month. Many parts in northern Texas recorded over 20 in (510 mm) of rain.

A 25-foot-by-25-foot sinkhole near a runway at the Dallas/Fort Worth International Airport caused the closure of the runway for a few hours.

Also on May 25, historic flooding along Shoal Creek inundated House Park in Austin, Texas damaging the turf among other things and forcing the Austin Aztex to search for a temporary home.

==== Houston ====
More than 500 water rescues were carried out by firefighters, which involved for the most part stranded motorists. At least 2,500 vehicles were abandoned, when drivers had to seek higher grounds.

During the overnight of May 25–26, nearly 11 in (280 mm) of rain fell near Houston, setting off further flash floods. Two people drowned after being trapped in their cars while a third was later found in bayou. A fourth person lost their life when an evacuation boat capsized during the morning of May 26. On May 26, Houston Mayor Annise Parker, estimated up to 4,000 properties with significant damage.

==== Blanco River ====
During the overnight of May 24–25, more than 12 in (300 mm) fell along the watershed of the Blanco River. In just a few short hours, the river rose from roughly 5 ft (1.5 m) to a crest just over 41 ft (12 m), well over the 13 ft (4.0 m) flood-stage, near Wimberley. This broke the river's all-time peak of 32 ft (9.8 m) set in 1929. Tremendous flash flooding ensued as a result, with areas of Hays County being particularly hard hit.

Entire blocks of homes in Wimberley were swept away by a "tidal wave of water" with officials reporting 350–400 residences destroyed in the town alone. For the first time, the river covered portions of Interstate 35, shutting down traffic for hours. Large trees and debris were deposited across the roadway.

One person in San Marcos, Texas was confirmed dead. Thirteen people were carried away when the home they were in was swept downstream. Residents reported seeing it being destroyed after striking a bridge. One occupant was recovered with significant injuries while the other twelve remain missing. At least 1,200 people have been left homeless along the river.

=== Oklahoma ===
On May 23, flash flooding along Highway 20 near Claremore claimed the life of a firefighter attempting to rescue people in an apartment complex. He was pulled into a storm drain obscured by the rising waters and carried hundreds of yards away. A fellow firefighter attempting to save him was pulled in as well but managed to escape. The day also saw some roads submerged in as much as 9 inches (230 mm) of water, and thousands of OG&E customers experienced power outages as a result of the flooding in Oklahoma City and Del City.

A station Oklahoma City recorded 19.48 inches (495 mm) of rainfall in May 2015, which made it the all-time wettest month on record. Records date back to 1890.

From May 1 to May 25, 122 tornado warnings were reported by the National Weather Service in Oklahoma, more than in the same period

The Oklahoma Department of Transportation reported on May 26 that a number of highways were closed because of high water or damage from previous flooding.

=== Louisiana ===
Flooding in Ruston, Louisiana on 18 May caused an eleven-year-old boy to drown in a submerged car along Colvin Creek.

== Response ==
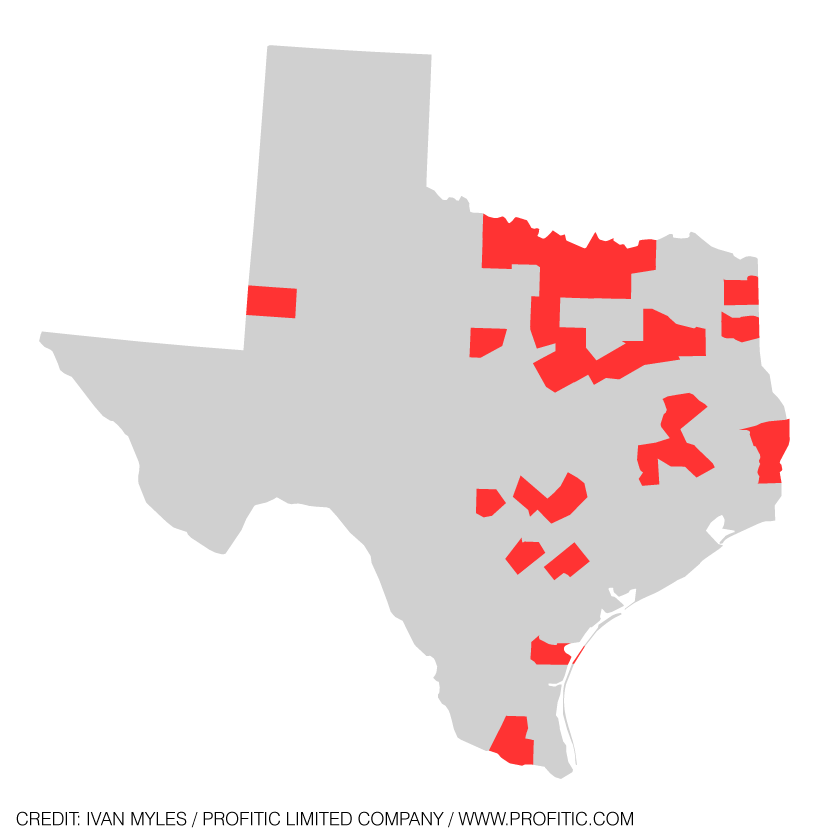
Texas counties under a state of emergency as of May 25

On May 24, voluntary evacuations were extended to include 2,177 homes near the Wichita River. On May 25, near Houston, about 400 homes were placed under mandatory evacuation orders downstream from the Louis Creek Dam.

On May 25, Texas Governor Greg Abbott declared a state of emergency for 24 counties as a result of the ongoing disaster, and called the floods the biggest in Texas history. On May 26, President Barack Obama announced federal resources to help affected areas in Texas, and signed a disaster declaration for Oklahoma. Houston Mayor Annise Parker declared a local state of disaster for the city of Houston on May 26.

On May 26, Governor Mary Fallin declared a state of emergency for all 77 counties in Oklahoma.

== Climate change ==
A study by Utah State University analyzed the pathway in which anthropogenic global warming contributed to the persistent precipitation in May 2015: Warming in the tropical Pacific acted to strengthen the teleconnection toward North America, modification of zonal wave-5 circulation that deepened the stationary trough west of Texas, and enhanced Great Plains low-level southerlies increasing moisture supply from the Gulf of Mexico. Attribution analysis indicated a significant increase in the El Niño-induced precipitation anomalies over Texas and Oklahoma when increases in the anthropogenic greenhouse gases were taken into account.

Studies by the Scripps Institution of Oceanography found for Texas that precipitation totals have increased 10 percent in the last century, but mostly in eastern Texas, with more frequent, severe and longer drought conditions in west Texas.

The report Regional Climate Trends and Scenarios for the U.S. National Climate Assessment (NCA) from 2013 by NOAA, projects that parts of Texas, and parts of the Great Plains region can expect up to 30% (High emissions scenario based on CMIP3 and NARCCAP models) increase in extreme precipitation days by midcentury. This definition is based on days receiving more than one inch of rainfall.

A study from April 2015 concluded that about 18% of moderate daily precipitation extremes over land are attributable to observed temperature increases since the Industrial Revolution and that this primarily results from human influence.

== See also ==
- Effects of Tropical Storm Allison in Texas
- June 2007 Texas flooding
- May 31, 2013 Oklahoma flooding
- Severe weather terminology (United States)
- 2016 Houston floods
