= Kismat =

Kismat may refer to:

- Kismet (disambiguation), word for "fate" or "destiny" and is an Arabic word as well as being used in Bengali, Hindi, Urdu, Nepali, Persian and Turkish, spelled "Kismat" in English in the Indian subcontinent
- Kismat (TV series), an Indian drama television series
- Kismat (Sonu Nigam album), 1998
- Kismat (1968 film), a 1968 Indian Hindi film directed by Manmohan Desai
- Kismat (1995 film), a 1995 Indian Bollywood film directed by Harmesh Malhotra
- Kismat (2004 film), a Bollywood film directed by Guddu Dhanoa
- Kismat (2024 film), an Indian Telugu-language crime comedy film
- Kismat Radio, a British radio station
- Qismat, a 2018 Indian Punjabi-language film by Jagdeep Sidhu
  - Qismat 2, its 2021 sequel, also by Sidhu
- Kismat, a 2025 song by Bloodywood on their album Nu Delhi

== See also ==
- Kismet (disambiguation)
- Kismath (disambiguation)
