= Fargo Township, Kansas =

Township in Seward County, Kansas, U.S.

Fargo Township
- Township
- Location within Seward County
- Coordinates: 37.127021°N 100.752425°W
- Country: United States
- State: Kansas
- County: Seward

Government
  - Districts 1 and 2 County Commissioners: Todd Stanton and Clay Louderback

Area
  - Total: 220.532 sq mi (571.18 km^{2})
  - Land: 220.124 sq mi (570.12 km^{2})
  - Water: 0.408 sq mi (1.06 km^{2}) 0.19%

Population (2020)
  - Total: 1,205
  - Density: 5.474/sq mi (2.114/km^{2})
- Time zone: UTC-6 (CST)
  - Summer (DST): UTC-5 (CDT)
- Area code: 620
- GNIS feature ID: 470670

Fargo Township is a township in Seward County, Kansas, United States. As of the 2020 census, its population was 1,205.

== History ==
The ghost town of Arkalon lies within the township.

== Geography ==
Fargo Township covers an area of 220.532 square miles (571.18 square kilometers). The Cimarron River flows through it.

=== Communities ===
- Kismet

=== Adjacent townships ===
Seward Township, Seward County
		north	northeast	West Plains Township, Meade County
Liberal Township, Seward County	west	self	east	Cimarron Township, Meade County
		south
Beaver County, Oklahoma

== Transportation ==
=== Major highways ===
- US-54
- US-83
