= Seward County, Kansas =

County in Kansas, United States

- County
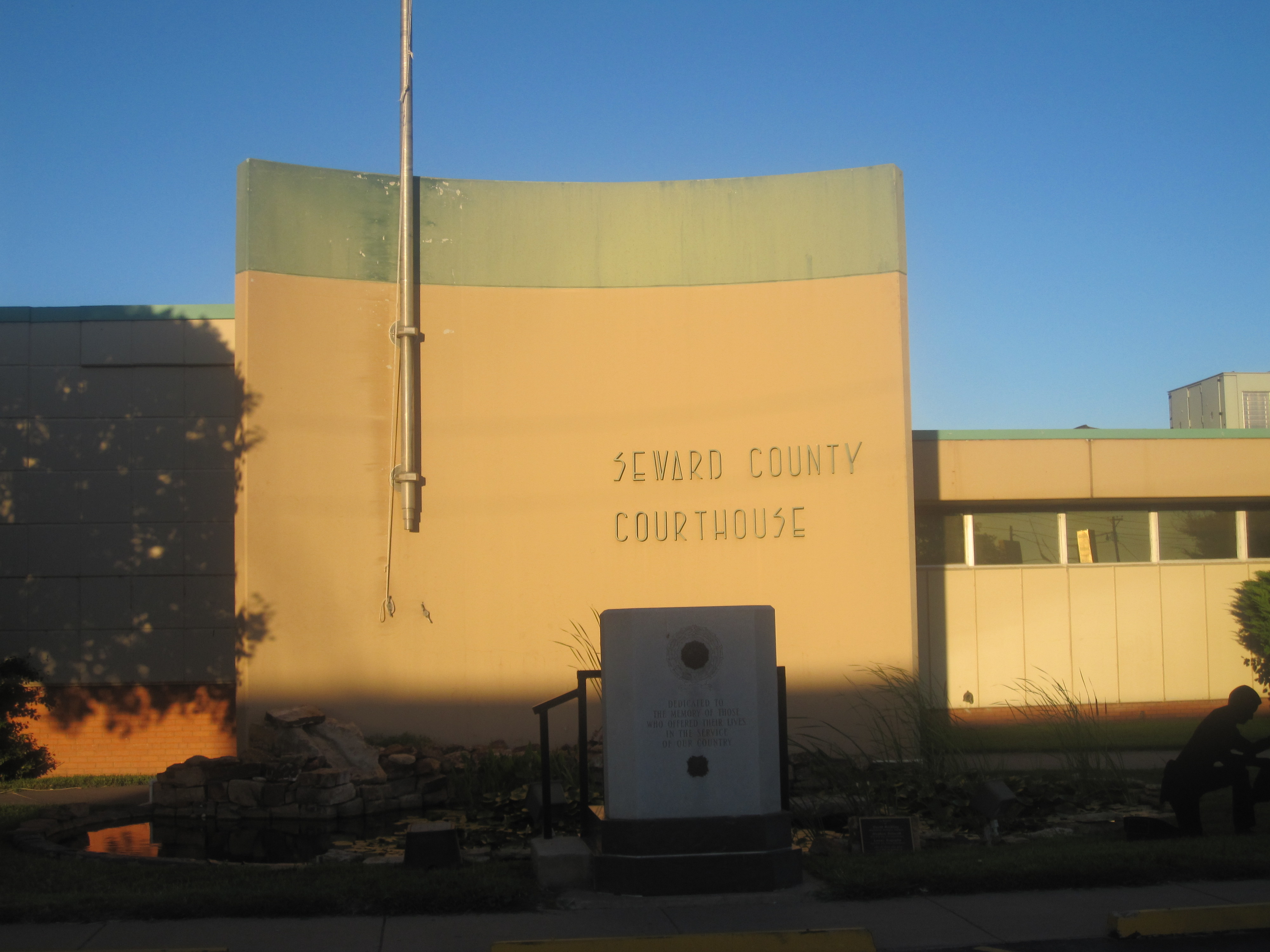
- Seward County Courthouse in Liberal (2010)

- Location within the U.S. state of Kansas
- Coordinates: 37°12′N 100°50′W
- Country: United States
- State: Kansas
- Founded: March 20, 1873
- Named for: William H. Seward
- Seat: Liberal
- Largest city: Liberal

Area
  - Total: 640 sq mi (1,700 km^{2})
  - Land: 639 sq mi (1,660 km^{2})
  - Water: 1.0 sq mi (2.6 km^{2}) 0.2%

Population (2020)
  - Total: 21,964
  - Estimate (2025): 21,073 ▼
  - Density: 34.4/sq mi (13.3/km^{2})
- Time zone: UTC−6 (Central)
  - Summer (DST): UTC−5 (CDT)
- Area code: 620
- Congressional district: 1st
- Website: www.sewardcountyks.org

Seward County is a county of the U.S. state of Kansas. Its county seat and largest city is Liberal. As of the 2020 census, the county population was 21,964. The county was formed on March 20, 1873, and named after William Seward, a politician and Secretary of State under Abraham Lincoln and Andrew Johnson.

== History ==
For millennia, the Great Plains of North America were inhabited by nomadic Native Americans. From the 16th century to the mid-19th century, the region that became southwestern Kansas was part of the vast hunting grounds utilized by tribes such as the Pawnee, Osage, Comanche, and Wichita. Following the Louisiana Purchase of 1803, early United States government expeditions explored the territory, frequently documenting the landscape as an arid expanse that became known as the "Great American Desert", which delayed early permanent Euro-American settlement.

In 1854, the Kansas Territory was organized, then in 1861 Kansas became the 34th U.S. state. During the Bleeding Kansas era (1854–1861), the violent ideological and political conflicts over slavery were concentrated almost entirely in the eastern half of the territory; the unorganized geographic area that would eventually become Seward County remained completely unsettled by Euro-Americans, devoid of permanent voting populations, and entirely unaffected by the guerrilla warfare, raids, or electoral fraud occurring along the Missouri border.

In 1873, Seward County was established, although it was administered from one of several neighboring counties until the county commissioners of Finney County organized Seward County as a municipal township of Finney County on June 10, 1885, with the temporary seat of government at Sunset City. The township was divided into two voting precincts - one headquartered at Sunset City and the other at Fargo Springs. The county was organized on June 17, 1886, with Governor John A. Martin designating Springfield the county seat and appointing men from Fargo Springs as county officers as not to favor one town over the other. Rivalry between Fargo Springs and Springfield became so intense both towns sent armed bodies of men to the other to prevent their voters from reaching the polls, causing a disputed election in 1885.

The county seat dispute was finally settled when the railroads bypassed both Fargo Springs and Springfield in favor of an alignment through southern Seward County, spurring the rapid growth of Liberal, which won the final election for county seat in on December 8, 1892, by 125 votes.

In the early 20th century, agricultural production shifted as Liberal briefly became a major market for broom corn, shipping hundreds of railcars of the crop annually. By 1910, hard winter wheat replaced broom corn as the primary regional cash crop.

The town of Arkalon, established in 1888 along the Cimarron River, served as a local railroad shipping hub for two decades. In 1914, a major flood destroyed the Cimarron River bridge leading into the settlement. Following the bridge failure, the Chicago, Rock Island and Pacific Railroad rerouted its regional operations through Liberal, which caused Arkalon to be abandoned; its post office closed in 1929.

The local economy shifted further from an exclusively agrarian base following the discovery of the Hugoton Gas Field in 1920. Subsequent drilling operations established the county as a major source of natural gas production.

In the 1930s, the prosperity of the area was severely affected by its location within the Dust Bowl. This catastrophe intensified the economic impact of the Great Depression in the region.

In 1992, National Beef opened a large meatpacking facility in Liberal, which became the largest employer in the county. The labor demands of the plant led to a major demographic shift; the county population transitioned over the subsequent decades from predominantly non-Hispanic white to majority Hispanic, recording the highest percentage of Hispanic residents among all Kansas counties by the early 21st century.

=== 21st century ===
On November 16, 2015, a significant tornado outbreak occurred across western Kansas, producing 17 tornadoes between 5:00 p.m. and 10:00 p.m. As part of this outbreak, a long-tracked wedge tornado touched down 4 miles (6.4 km) northeast of Liberal at 5:38 p.m. CST. The tornado traveled northeast for 51.26 miles (82.49 km) across Seward, Meade, and Gray counties, moving nearly parallel to U.S. Highway 54 along a path almost identical to a tornado that had occurred earlier that year on May 24.

The National Weather Service rated the storm as an EF3 tornado, estimating peak winds at 155 miles per hour (249 km/h) and a maximum width of 2,000 yards (1.1 mi; 1,800 m). The path of the tornado passed north of Kismet, Kansas and Plains, Kansas, avoiding direct impacts on those population centers. In rural Seward County, the tornado reached its maximum intensity just west of Kismet, where it destroyed a mobile home, obliterated a commercial metal hog containment building, killed livestock, threw a steel oil tank, snapped miles of wooden power poles, and damaged numerous irrigation pivot sprinklers. The tornado exited Seward County at approximately 6:06 p.m. CST; no human injuries or fatalities were reported within the county.

== Geography ==
According to the U.S. Census Bureau, the county has a total area of 640 square miles (1,700 km^{2}), of which 639 square miles (1,660 km^{2}) is land and 1.0 square mile (2.6 km^{2}) (0.2%) is water. It borders Oklahoma to the south.

=== Adjacent counties ===
- Haskell County (north)
- Meade County (east)
- Beaver County, Oklahoma (southeast)
- Texas County, Oklahoma (southwest)
- Stevens County (west)

== Demographics ==
Historical population
Census	Pop.	Note	%±
1880	5		—
1890	1,503		29,960.0%
1900	822		−45.3%
1910	4,091		397.7%
1920	6,220		52.0%
1930	8,075		29.8%
1940	6,540		−19.0%
1950	9,972		52.5%
1960	15,930		59.7%
1970	15,744		−1.2%
1980	17,071		8.4%
1990	18,743		9.8%
2000	22,510		20.1%
2010	22,952		2.0%
2020	21,964		−4.3%
2025 (est.)	21,073	▼	−4.1%
U.S. Decennial Census; 1790-1960 1900-1990; 1990-2000 2010-2020

The Liberal, KS Micropolitan Statistical Area includes all of Seward County.

=== Racial and ethnic composition ===
Seward County, Kansas – Racial and ethnic composition Note: the US Census treats Hispanic/Latino as an ethnic category. This table excludes Latinos from the racial categories and assigns them to a separate category. Hispanics/Latinos may be of any race.
Race / Ethnicity (NH = Non-Hispanic)	Pop 1980	Pop 1990	Pop 2000	Pop 2010	Pop 2020	% 1980	% 1990	% 2000	% 2010	% 2020
White alone (NH)	2,138,516	2,190,524	11,126	8,261	5,928	90.47%	88.41%	49.43%	35.99%	26.99%
Black or African American alone (NH)	124,820	140,761	806	687	611	5.28%	5.68%	3.58%	2.99%	2.78%
Native American or Alaska Native alone (NH)	15,311	20,363	127	70	66	0.65%	0.82%	0.56%	0.30%	0.30%
Asian alone (NH)	15,061	30,814	638	594	517	0.64%	1.24%	2.83%	2.59%	2.35%
Native Hawaiian or Pacific Islander alone (NH)	x	x	5	31	1	x	x	0.02%	0.14%	0.00%
Other race alone (NH)	6,632	1,442	13	14	42	0.28%	0.06%	0.06%	0.06%	0.19%
Mixed race or Multiracial (NH)	x	x	309	305	393	x	x	1.37%	1.33%	1.79%
Hispanic or Latino (any race)	63,339	93,670	9,486	12,990	14,406	2.68%	3.78%	42.14%	56.60%	65.59%
Total	2,363,679	2,477,574	22,510	22,952	21,964	100.00%	100.00%	100.00%	100.00%	100.00%

=== 2020 census ===
As of the 2020 census, the county had a population of 21,964. The median age was 30.8 years. 30.5% of residents were under the age of 18 and 10.4% of residents were 65 years of age or older. For every 100 females there were 102.1 males, and for every 100 females age 18 and over there were 99.3 males age 18 and over.

The racial makeup of the county was 41.0% White, 3.1% Black or African American, 2.4% American Indian and Alaska Native, 2.4% Asian, 0.0% Native Hawaiian and Pacific Islander, 27.2% from some other race, and 23.8% from two or more races. Hispanic or Latino residents of any race comprised 65.6% of the population.

90.3% of residents lived in urban areas, while 9.7% lived in rural areas.

There were 7,359 households in the county, of which 44.0% had children under the age of 18 living with them and 24.4% had a female householder with no spouse or partner present. About 22.6% of all households were made up of individuals and 8.2% had someone living alone who was 65 years of age or older.

There were 8,268 housing units, of which 11.0% were vacant. Among occupied housing units, 62.6% were owner-occupied and 37.4% were renter-occupied. The homeowner vacancy rate was 2.0% and the rental vacancy rate was 11.4%.

=== 2000 census ===
As of the census of 2000, there were 22,510 people, 7,419 households, and 5,504 families residing in the county. The population density was 35 people per square mile (14 people/km^{2}). There were 8,027 housing units at an average density of 13 per square mile (5.0/km^{2}). The racial makeup of the county was 65.44% White, 3.78% Black or African American, 0.77% Native American, 2.86% Asian, 0.06% Pacific Islander, 23.81% from other races, and 3.27% from two or more races. 42.14% of the population were Hispanic or Latino of any race.

There were 7,419 households, out of which 43.50% had children under the age of 18 living with them, 59.60% were married couples living together, 10.00% had a female householder with no husband present, and 25.80% were non-families. 20.60% of all households were made up of individuals, and 7.80% had someone living alone who was 65 years of age or older. The average household size was 2.98 and the average family size was 3.46.

In the county, the population was spread out, with 32.00% under the age of 18, 11.70% from 18 to 24, 30.50% from 25 to 44, 16.90% from 45 to 64, and 8.90% who were 65 years of age or older. The median age was 29 years. For every 100 females, there were 105.30 males. For every 100 females age 18 and over, there were 103.70 males.

The median income for a household in the county was $36,752, and the median income for a family was $41,134. Males had a median income of $29,765 versus $21,889 for females. The per capita income for the county was $15,059. About 13.90% of families and 16.90% of the population were below the poverty line, including 21.00% of those under age 18 and 7.30% of those age 65 or over.

=== Hispanic majority population ===
The demographics of Seward County has changed form a largely non-Hispanic white population in the 20th century to a majority Hispanic population in the 21st century. In 1990, Hispanics in the county made up 19.7 percent of the population; in 2022 the Hispanic population made up 66.2 percent of the population. Seward country has a larger percentage of Hispanics in its population than any other county in Kansas.

The Hispanic population increased because in 1992 National Beef began operation of a large meat-packing plant in Liberal which employs 3,500 persons, most of them Hispanic. The meat packing plant is the largest employer in the county.

== Government ==
=== Presidential elections ===
Presidential election results

United States presidential election results for Seward County, Kansas
Year	Republican		Democratic		Third party(ies)	
Year	No.	%	No.	%	No.	%
1888	400	61.16%	207	31.65%	47	7.19%
1892	156	57.14%	0	0.00%	117	42.86%
1896	100	55.87%	78	43.58%	1	0.56%
1900	122	60.40%	77	38.12%	3	1.49%
1904	152	65.52%	62	26.72%	18	7.76%
1908	427	48.09%	413	46.51%	48	5.41%
1912	155	14.98%	394	38.07%	486	46.96%
1916	678	34.52%	1,105	56.26%	181	9.22%
1920	1,290	61.52%	722	34.43%	85	4.05%
1924	1,184	52.00%	676	29.69%	417	18.31%
1928	1,873	76.98%	538	22.11%	22	0.90%
1932	1,297	43.64%	1,576	53.03%	99	3.33%
1936	1,108	35.64%	1,997	64.23%	4	0.13%
1940	1,503	49.65%	1,474	48.70%	50	1.65%
1944	1,590	53.92%	1,342	45.51%	17	0.58%
1948	1,829	52.00%	1,614	45.89%	74	2.10%
1952	3,136	72.79%	1,146	26.60%	26	0.60%
1956	2,885	70.95%	1,162	28.58%	19	0.47%
1960	3,974	70.44%	1,654	29.32%	14	0.25%
1964	2,910	53.28%	2,520	46.14%	32	0.59%
1968	3,065	62.32%	1,291	26.25%	562	11.43%
1972	3,866	77.27%	989	19.77%	148	2.96%
1976	3,604	64.19%	1,907	33.96%	104	1.85%
1980	4,385	70.83%	1,460	23.58%	346	5.59%
1984	5,222	80.54%	1,198	18.48%	64	0.99%
1988	4,089	70.54%	1,655	28.55%	53	0.91%
1992	3,477	51.09%	1,488	21.86%	1,841	27.05%
1996	3,812	68.40%	1,309	23.49%	452	8.11%
2000	3,869	75.92%	1,126	22.10%	101	1.98%
2004	4,272	78.54%	1,122	20.63%	45	0.83%
2008	3,791	71.05%	1,493	27.98%	52	0.97%
2012	3,617	69.88%	1,490	28.79%	69	1.33%
2016	3,159	62.70%	1,628	32.31%	251	4.98%
2020	3,372	63.69%	1,833	34.62%	89	1.68%
2024	3,133	68.63%	1,354	29.66%	78	1.71%

Seward County has voted Republican since 1940. The last time Seward County voted for a Democratic candidate for president was when it favored incumbent Democrat Franklin D. Roosevelt in 1936 over Kansas governor Alf Landon. In the Kansas Senate it is currently represented by Republican Garrett Love. In the Kansas House of Representatives it is represented by Republicans Bill Light and Carl Holmes.

In 2016, Hillary Clinton became the first Democrat to break 30% in Seward County since Jimmy Carter in 1976. Four years later, Democrat Joe Biden would receive 34.6% of the vote, the highest share for a Democrat since Lyndon B. Johnson received 46.1% in Seward County in 1964.

=== Laws ===
Following amendment to the Kansas Constitution in 1986, the county remained a prohibition, or "dry", county until 1996, when voters approved the sale of alcoholic liquor by the individual drink with a 30% food sales requirement.

The county narrowly voted "No" on the 2022 Kansas abortion referendum, an anti-abortion ballot measure, by 50.5% to 49.5%.

== Education ==
=== Unified school districts ===
- Liberal USD 480
- Kismet-Plains USD 483

== Communities ==
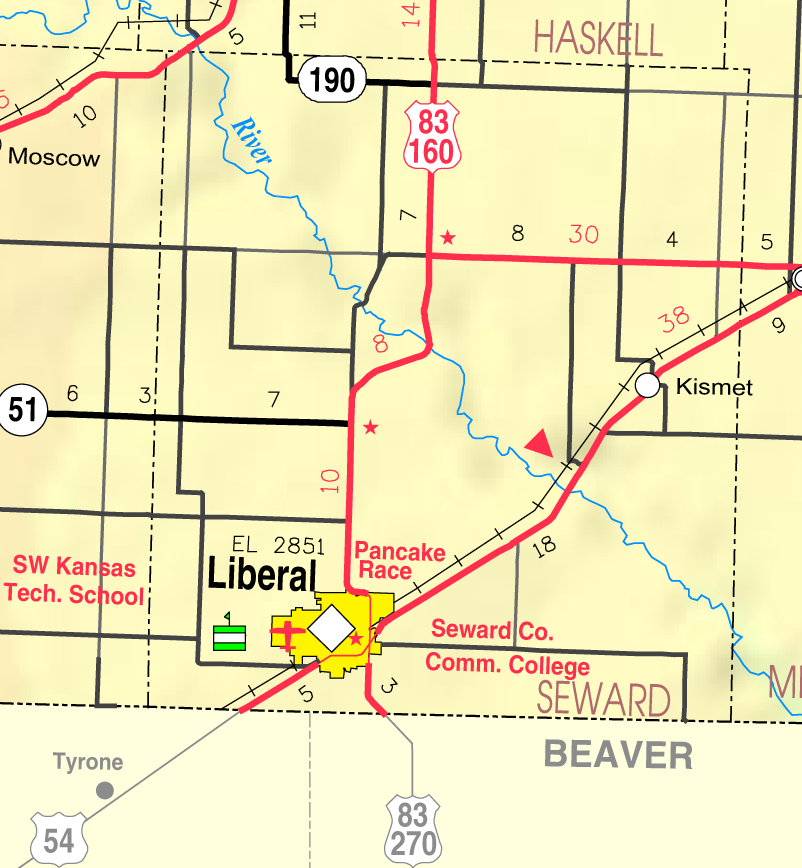
2005 map of Seward County (map legend)

List of townships / incorporated cities / unincorporated communities / extinct former communities within Seward County.

=== Cities ===
- Kismet
- Liberal (county seat)

=== Unincorporated communities ===
- Hayne

=== Ghost towns ===
- Arkalon

=== Townships ===
Area affected by 1930s Dust Bowl

Seward County is divided into three townships. The city of Liberal is considered governmentally independent and is excluded from the census figures for the townships. In the following table, the population center is the largest city (or cities) included in that township's population total, if it is of a significant size.

Sources: 2000 U.S. Gazetteer from the U.S. Census Bureau.
Township	FIPS	Population center	Population	Population density /km^{2} (/sq mi)	Land area km^{2} (sq mi)	Water area km^{2} (sq mi)	Water %	Geographic coordinates
Fargo	23000		1,684	3 (8)	570 (220)	2 (1)	0.29%	37°9′1″N 100°45′3″W
Liberal	39850		803	2 (4)	502 (194)	0 (0)	0.03%	37°5′52″N 100°56′58″W
Seward	64075		357	1 (2)	556 (215)	0 (0)	0.06%	37°18′55″N 100°50′34″W

== See also ==
Community information for Kansas

- Kansas locations by per capita income
- List of counties in Kansas
- List of townships in Kansas
- List of cities in Kansas
- List of unincorporated communities in Kansas
- List of ghost towns in Kansas
