= Kismet =

Kismet may refer to:

- The Turkic term for predestination in Islam

== Comics ==
- Kismet (Marvel Comics), a superheroine
- Kismet, Man of Fate, the first Muslim superhero, originally published by Gilberton Publications

== Film ==
- Kismet (1920 film), a film starring Otis Skinner and directed by Louis J. Gasnier, based on the 1911 play
- Kismet (1929 film), a Hindi film by Baburao Patel
- Kismet (1930 film), a film starring Loretta Young and Otis Skinner, also based on the play
- Kismet (1931 film), a film by William Dieterle, also based on the play
- Kismet (1943 film), a Hindi film starring Ashok Kumar
- Kismet (1944 film), a film starring Ronald Colman and Marlene Dietrich, also based on the play
- Kismet (1955 film), a film by Vincente Minnelli and based on the 1953 musical
- Kismet (1956), a 1956 Indian-Turkish film by Nanabhai Bhatt and Semih Evin
- Kismet (1956 film), a Pakistani drama film
- Kismet (1967 film), an American TV film
- Kismet (1980 film), a Hindi film starring Mithun Chakraborty
- Kismet, a 1999 American short starring Stephanie Niznik

== Music ==
- Kismet (band), a 1993–2002 Australian rock group formed as an offshoot of Mizar

=== Albums and EP ===
- Kismet (Adriana Evans album) (2005)
- Kismet (EP), a 2023 EP by Belinda Carlisle
- Kismet (Jesca Hoop album) (2007)
- Kismet (The Mastersounds album) (1958)
- Kismet, album by Stelios Petrakis and Bijan Cherimani of the Chemirani Ensemble

=== Songs ===
- "Kismet" (Elitsa & Stoyan song), the 2013 Bulgarian Eurovision entry
- "Kismet", a song by Bond from Born
- "Kismet", a song by Flowing Tears from Thy Kingdom Gone
- "Kismet", an instrumental song by Kamelot from Silverthorn
- "Kismet", a song by Elvis Presley from Harum Scarum
- "Kismet", a song by Raveena from Asha's Awakening
- "Kismet", a song by SZA from S

== Places ==
- Kismet, California, an unincorporated community
- Kismet, Kansas, a village near Kansas's southwestern corner
- Kismet, New York, a hamlet on Fire Island, New York

== Stage ==
- Kismet (play), a 1911 play by Edward Knoblock
- Kismet (musical), a 1953 musical version of the 1911 play

== Technology ==
- Kismet (gameplay scripting), a scripting tool for the Unreal Engine from Epic Games
- Kismet (robot), a robot intended to demonstrate simulated emotion
- Kismet (software), software used to analyze wireless network traffic

== Other uses ==
- Kismet (chocolate bar), a Finnish chocolate bar
- Kismet (dice game)
- Kismet (yacht), a 2014 superyacht
- Kismet, a Drosophila Trithorax-group protein homologous to CHD7

== See also ==
- Akismet, a server-based spam filter
- Ashima, Semitic goddess of fate
- Destiny or fate
- Kismat (disambiguation)
- Kismath (disambiguation)
