= Hayne, Kansas =

Unincorporated community in Seward County, Kansas

- Unincorporated community
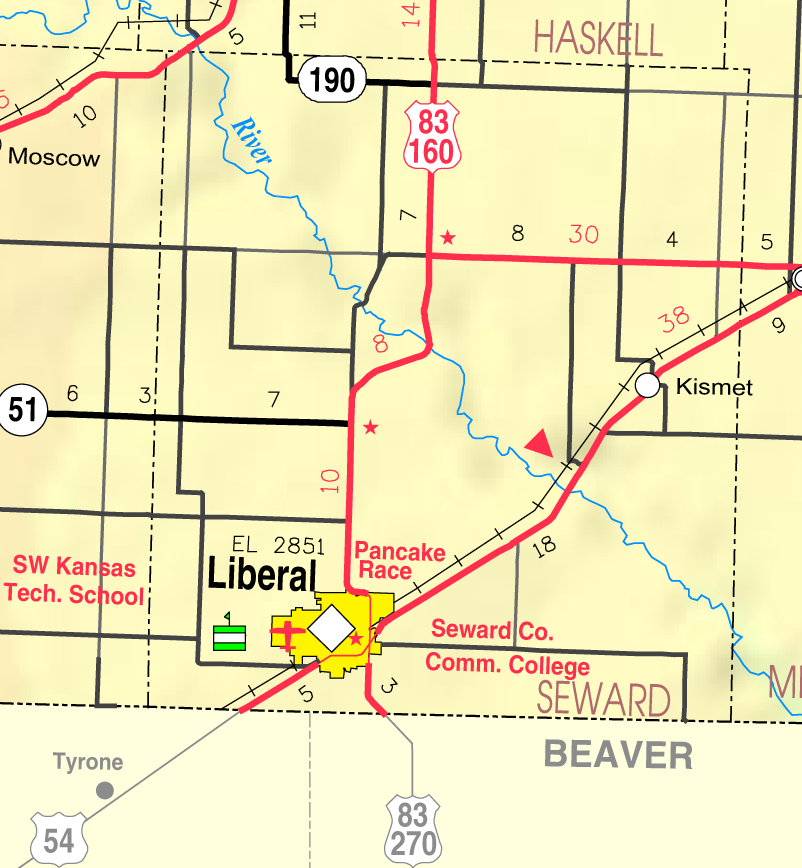
- KDOT map of Seward County (legend)

- Location within Kansas Location within the United States
- Coordinates: 37°6′2.09″N 100°48′14.58″W
- Country: United States
- State: Kansas
- County: Seward
- Elevation: 2,772 ft (845 m)
- Time zone: UTC-6 (CST)
  - Summer (DST): UTC-5 (CDT)
- FIPS code: 20-31050
- GNIS ID: 484536

Hayne is an unincorporated community in Seward County, Kansas, United States. It is located northeast of Liberal along U.S. Route 54 highway.

== History ==
A post office was opened in Hayne in 1908, and remained in operation until it was discontinued in 1925.

== Education ==
The community is served by Southwestern Heights USD 483 public school district. Its high school, Southwestern Heights, is located between Kismet and Plains along U.S. Route 54 highway.
