= Ari Ari (Indian Street Metal) =

2018 song by Bloodywood

Single by Bloodywood
- Language: English; Punjabi
- Released: 1 May 2018
- Genre: Rap metal; nu metal; heavy metal
- Length: 5:15

Bloodywood singles chronology
"Rang Basanti" (2018)	"Ari Ari (Indian Street Metal)" (2018)	"Jee Veerey" (2018)

Music video
- Official music video on YouTube

"Ari Ari (Note: Punjabi: Gurmukhi: ਆਰੀ ਆਰੀ) (Indian Street Metal)" is a single by the Indian heavy metal band Bloodywood. The track is their first song to feature rapper Raoul Kerr, who would later become a permanent member of the band.

Initially released to their YouTube channel at the beginning of May 2018, the song gained traction after being promoted by actress Ileana D'Cruz. Ari Ari has since become one of the band's best-known songs, with over six million views as of September 2022.

== Background ==
Ari Ari is a cover of a cover. The original, Baari Barsi, is a traditional folk song usually sung in call-and-response form with improvised verses. It was later covered multiple times by the bhangra duo Bombay Rockers. The version on their 2007 album, Crash and Burn, serves as the basis for Bloodywood's reinterpretation.

Bloodywood guitarist and flautist, Karan Katiyar, has stated that the song was chosen due to it being unheard of outside of the country: "No one knew about "Ari Ari" outside India and that's where it worked."

The majority of the group's prior material is composed of humorous covers of well-known songs. Ari Ari is considered by the band to be their first "serious" attempt at original material. They decided to not include it on their 2022 debut album, Rakshak, as they preferred to only include original material on the record.

== Composition ==
=== Instrumentation ===
The song heavily features a tin whistle melody, which is a largely atypical instrument across heavy metal. The instrument also features in the Bombay Rockers cover version of the song. The dhol, a traditional Indian drum, acts as the song's main percussion instrument.

=== Lyrics ===
The lyrics to the chorus of Ari Ari speak of unity and equality. Translated from Punjabi, they read, "Besides all differences, we are one".

== Reception ==
The song was widely praised after its rise to popularity, having accumulated over ten million views on Facebook in 2018 alone.

YouTube music reviewer Alex Hefner spoke highly of the song, describing it as "absolutely unique, unlike anything that [he'd] ever heard before".

== Music video ==
Described as "joyful", Ari Ari's music video is largely filmed on the streets of India. Many scenes involve Katiyar playing guitar atop a camel, the band gate-crashing a wedding setup, and vocalist Jayant Bhadula riding a horse.
