= Kismath =

Kismath may refer to:

- Kismath (2016 film), an Indian Malayalam-language romantic drama film
- Kismath (2018 film), an Indian Kannada-language black comedy film

== See also ==
- Kismat (disambiguation)
- Kismet (disambiguation)
