= Ladrones (band) =

Mexican nu metal band

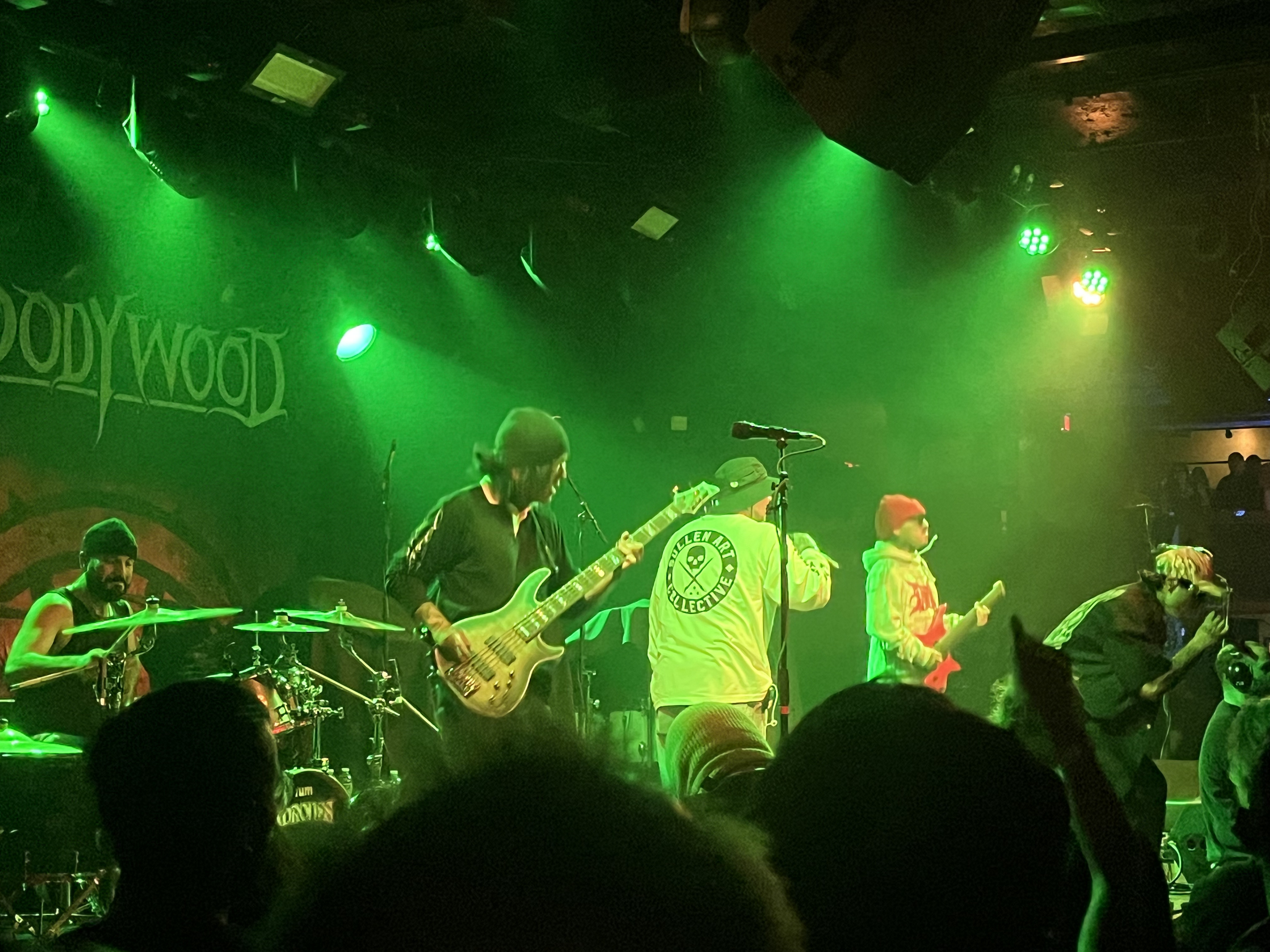
- Ladrones performing in Boston in 2026

Background information
- Origin: Guadalajara, Jalisco, Mexico
- Genres: Nu metal; rap metal; trap music; Música Mexicana; corridos tumbados
- Years active: 2021–present
- Labels: Rise Records; Alzada
- Members: Zxmyr; Cirujano Resendez; José Macario; Diego Zornoza
- Website: ladrones.mx

Ladrones is a Mexican heavy metal band formed in Guadalajara in 2021. The band is known for combining elements of metal, hip-hop, and regional Mexican music. The band is formed of vocalists Zxmyr and Cirujano Resendez, guitarist José Macario, and drummer Diego Zornoza. They are managed by SiriusXM radio host, Jose Mangin and the Mexican producer Alan Ledesma of Alzada Records in Mexico.

== History ==
Ladrones are from Guadalajara, Mexico, and were brought together by producer and founder of the independent record label Alzada, Alan Ledesma. The band plays a mix of metal, hip-hop, and regional Mexican music, featuring nine-string guitars. It began in 2021 with the recording of the song, Díganme, which came together during a visit to Alzada's studios by Zxmyr.

In May 2024, Ladrones released the single, "Mi Momento". They would release their debut album later in the year, titled Flow Pesado. The band would go on the Mexican Pesado Tour in 2025, playing shows across Mexico, including the Guadalajara-based Festival Hermoso Cariño, further taking the tour into South America.

Later in 2025, Ladrones released their second album, Mexican Pesado. In December 2025, Ladrones, The Pretty Wild, and Ankor were announced as support for Bloodywood's 2026 System Of A Brown tour, playing through the United States.

In January 2026, Ladrones released the song "Extra XD" in collaboration with Muñeki77a, an Argentinian nu-metal artist. Later in the month, Ladrones performed during the first day of the NAMM Show.

In March 2026, Ladrones signed with Rise Records. The next month, Ladrones released their first single and music video with the label titled "Ay Ay Ay". In that time, the band continued to tour, playing festivals like Nu Metal Revolution, Vive Latino, and Welcome to Rockville.

On June 26, 2026, the band announced their third album, Arriba La L, which was released on August 28. Following the release of the album, Ladrones were announced as support for Polyphia's North American tour, and as an opening band for Deftones' festival, Día de los Deftones.

On September 4, 2026, Ladrones were featured on the single "Culture Wound", by We Came as Romans, from the band's deluxe edition album All is Beautiful... Because We're Doomed: Circularity.

On September 16, 2026, Ladrones announced their first headlining tour, which included support from the band Empty Shell Casing.

== Band members ==
- Zxmyr (Álvaro Samir Zornoza Ceja) – vocals
- Cirujano Resendez – vocals
- José Macario – guitars
- Diego Zornoza Ceja – drums

=== Touring ===
- Chamuco – bass

== Discography ==
=== Studio albums ===
List of studio albums, with selected details
Title	Album details
Flow Pesado	Released: February 16, 2024; Label: Alzada
Mexican Pesado	Released: May 28, 2025; Label: Alzada
Arriba La L	Released: August 28, 2026; Label: Rise Records
