= June 2007 Texas flooding =

Natural disaster in Texas, United States

The June 2007 Texas flooding occurred after heavy rains hit the Southern Plains of the United States. Moisture from the Gulf of Mexico flowed north creating a slow-moving frontal system. Approximately 200 millimeters (8 inches) of rain poured in northern Texas, and 2 flood-related deaths were reported.

== Meteorological History ==
During mid-June, moisture from the Gulf of Mexico flowed north creating a slow-moving frontal system that caused heavy rains in southern parts of the United States. Approximately 200 millimeters (8 inches) of rain hit northern Texas. The rain fell on swollen streams and lakes as well as wet soil causing heavy flooding in parts of northern Texas. Marble Falls, one of the hardest hit areas, received 18 inches (460 mm) of rain in a period six hours. The headwaters of Lake Marble Falls and Lake Travis had 19 inches of rain totals recorded.

== Damage ==
2 flood-related deaths were reported and approximately 300 homes were ordered to evacuate. Estimates of monetary damage caused by the storm exceed $50 million.^{[3]}156 flash flood warnings were issued throughout the month, as well.

== See also ==
- 2015 Texas–Oklahoma floods
- Flash Flood Alley
