= Rakshak (album) =

Studio album by Bloodywood
- Released: 18 February 2022
- Genres: Nu metal; rap metal; folk metal; Indian folk music
- Length: 47:13
- Languages: English; Punjabi; Hindi
- Label: Independent
- Producer: Karan Katiyar

Bloodywood chronology
Anti-Pop Vol. 1 (2017)	Rakshak (2022)	Nu Delhi (2025)

Singles from Rakshak
- 1. "Gaddaar" Released: 9 November 2021; 2. "Aaj" Released: 24 January 2022; 3. "Dana Dan" Released: 18 February 2022

Rakshak (Hindi: रक्षक, romanized: rakṣak "protector") is the debut studio album by the Indian heavy metal band Bloodywood, independently released on 18 February 2022. The album's music is a blend of Indian folk music and heavy metal, while the lyrics are sung in the English, Hindi and Punjabi languages.

The album entered the Billboard charts, making Bloodywood the first Indian metal band to achieve such an accomplishment. The album has been successful on Bandcamp as well, where it topped the album sales of the platform upon release, ranked (as of early March 2022) as the 22nd all-time best-selling new release and as 3rd best-selling metal release.

== Background ==
Since its inception in 2016, the band has gained attention on the internet with their Indian folk metal covers of pop and Indian songs. They would go on to release a cover album titled Anti-Pop Vol. 1 with songs by Backstreet Boys, 50 Cent, Ariana Grande, Nirvana and Linkin Park. Rapper Raoul, who was initially a guest, eventually became part of the band.

For their debut album, however, they opted to use only original material, re-recording some earlier songs that had been released in the past. The band claims to have been approached by multiple labels, but decided to stay independent for this album.

== Themes ==
When asked about the album's meaning, vocalist/rapper Raoul said that it "is about a joint effort to protect people and the planet as a whole from all the challenges we’re facing. We hope to do this by eliminating the challenges altogether, because the best defence is a great offence. You'll hear messages about divisive politics, corruption, toxic news, sexual assault and bullying, as well as personal ones about battling depression and pushing your limits".

The title, which translates as "protector", conveys the sense that "you are your own saviour, you have the strength within you to meet challenges". The artwork features a boy and an elephant behind him; the animal represents "the strength within this fragile creature".

== Songs ==
Rakshak features both songs which were written for the album, as well as earlier original compositions by the band which were formerly released as independent singles for various causes. Kerr has stated that previous songs such as the popular Ari Ari (Indian Street Metal) were left off of the album due to not being entirely original compositions by the band.

=== Re-recordings of original songs (2018-2020) ===
"Jee Veerey" was initially released in July 2018, in response to a widely criticised infographic distributed by the Ministry of Health and Family Welfare in June regarding depression. The band distributed 60 free private therapy sessions through a partnership with a non-governmental organisation. Several fans of the band paid for further sessions for others as a result.

"Endurant" is an anti-bullying song which encourages listeners to "endure and come out stronger rather than retaliate or fight back with force". Released in January 2019, the music video for the song focuses on the differing adult life experiences of a bully and his victim.

"Machi Bhasad", released in April 2019, was originally composed for the currently unreleased game Beyond Good and Evil 2, but was ultimately rejected. Intended as a call to action to fight injustice, the song was released just as the band revealed 2019 European tour dates.

"Yaad", released in early 2020, focuses on moving on from the death of a loved one. The band purchased an ambulance for use by a local animal shelter with the release of the song.

=== Songs written for Rakshak (2021-2022) ===
The first single written for the album, "Gaddaar", was released on 9 November 2021 and features political commentary, exploring "how politicians rely on dishing out hate in order to gain votes and raise their political standing, and how one can rebel to break the cycle" while advocating for the separation of church and state.

The second single and video, "Aaj", came out on 24 January 2022. The video was shot in Munnar, Kerala, and the band faced a handful of difficulties while doing it, including bad weather, denial of permission for shooting, leeches and accidents with drones.

The final single released from the album, "Dana-Dan", harshly views rape culture and patriarchy. The band states:

"Dana Dan" is a graphic commentary on sexual assault and the need to eliminate it. It begins with the reflexive, almost homicidal rage we feel when we hear about these crimes, before moving on to a more level headed call to arms. It culminates in a gentle appeal for all of us to reflect on the role we play in creating a world where atrocities of this nature are committed and to work towards eliminating it altogether.

“Dana-Dan” was also featured in Dev Patel’s film Monkey Man.

== Reception ==
Professional ratings
Review scores
Source	Rating
Angry Metal Guy	3.5/5
Blabbermouth.net	7.5/10
Kerrang!	4/5
Metal Hammer	4/5 stars
United News of India	8.5/10

Since its release, Rakshak received critical acclaim, being praised for its lyrics, performances and musicianship. The Moshville Times's editor-in-chief Iain "Mosh" Purdie called the album "a superb release especially for those new to the band". He said the band could have made more new music, but that the new and old songs are enough for a live show setlist.

On United News of India, Anand Venkitachalam praised the band's "very unique combination of metal which is a mix of heavy almost Korn like riffs combined with hip hop, electronic music and of course Indian folk music such as bhangra, alternating between rap verses of Raoul Kerr and the growled and clean vocals of Jayanth Bhadula". He was also happy with Raoul Kerr's rapping, which he thought blended well with the band's metal sound. He ultimately said the album "has it all from heaviness to infectious grooves to powerful melodies giving the Indian folk metal group a debut they are can[sic] be very proud of."

Kerrang!'s Paul Travers praised the band's more "serious" tone (compared with their covers) and said they "have a sound like no one else in the world right now. Rakshak is equal parts joyous, furious and incendiary and its creators look set to be the first Indian metal band to truly explode on a global scale."

Writing on Blabbermouth.net, Dom Lawson commented that "even with the novelty value of their early works erased, Bloodywood still make a wholly unique racket, with the gently otherworldly allure of those samples providing a consistent red line through a surprisingly diverse set of songs." On the other hand, he thought the group sounded "less convincing" when performing nu metal music, describing "Zanjeero Se" as "fairly thin gruel" compared to the "rambunctious clangor of "Machi Bhasad" and "Endurant"." He ultimately said that "the essence of Bloodywood's cheerfully revolutionary approach to modern metal is on full display and at full pelt with those infectious Bollywood embellishments proudly to the fore. In those moments, if not all of "Rakshak", Bloodywood sound like one of the greatest ideas ever."

TheKenWord, on Angry Metal Guy, said that the band "succeeds in no small part because it expresses complex human experiences through effortlessly accessible writing." He criticized the mixing and mastering of some tracks - namely "Jee Veerey" and "Endurant" - for not properly blending the folk instruments with the metal sound. He also said the rapping vocals sometimes sound "detached" on softer songs.

Metal Hammer's Elliot Leaver praised the band's "impressive musical range whilst inherently staying true to their native roots" and ultimately reflected that "if this is what Bloodywood can achieve on their own, imagine where they could go with a label behind them. Surely that's only a matter of time." The magazine also ranked the album as the 14th most anticipated metal album of 2022.

=== Accolades ===
Publication	List	Rank
Metal Hammer	The Best Metal Albums Of 2022 So Far	–

== Track listing ==
All tracks are written by Karan Katiyar.

Rakshak track listing
No.	Title	Length
1.	"Gaddaar" (Traitor)	4:44
2.	"Aaj" (Today)	5:00
3.	"Zanjeero Se" (These Chains)	4:11
4.	"Machi Bhasad (Album Version)" (Expect a Riot)	4:00
5.	"Dana-Dan" (Give a Beatdown)	4:54
6.	"Jee Veerey (Album Version)" (Live, Brave One)	4:38
7.	"Endurant (Album Version)"	4:46
8.	"Yaad (Album Version)" (In Memory)	5:40
9.	"BSDK.exe"	4:55
10.	"Chakh Le" (Rise Up)	4:25
Total length:		47:13

== Personnel ==
Bloodywood

- Jayant Bhadula – vocals
- Raoul Kerr – rap vocals
- Karan Katiyar – guitars, flutes, arrangements, production

== Charts ==
Chart performance for Rakshak
Chart (2022)	Peak position
UK Independent Albums (Official Charts)	26
UK Rock & Metal Albums (Official Charts)	8
US Digital Albums (Billboard)	5
US Top Album Sales (Billboard)	93
US World Albums (Billboard)	10
