= Ankor (band) =

Spanish metal band

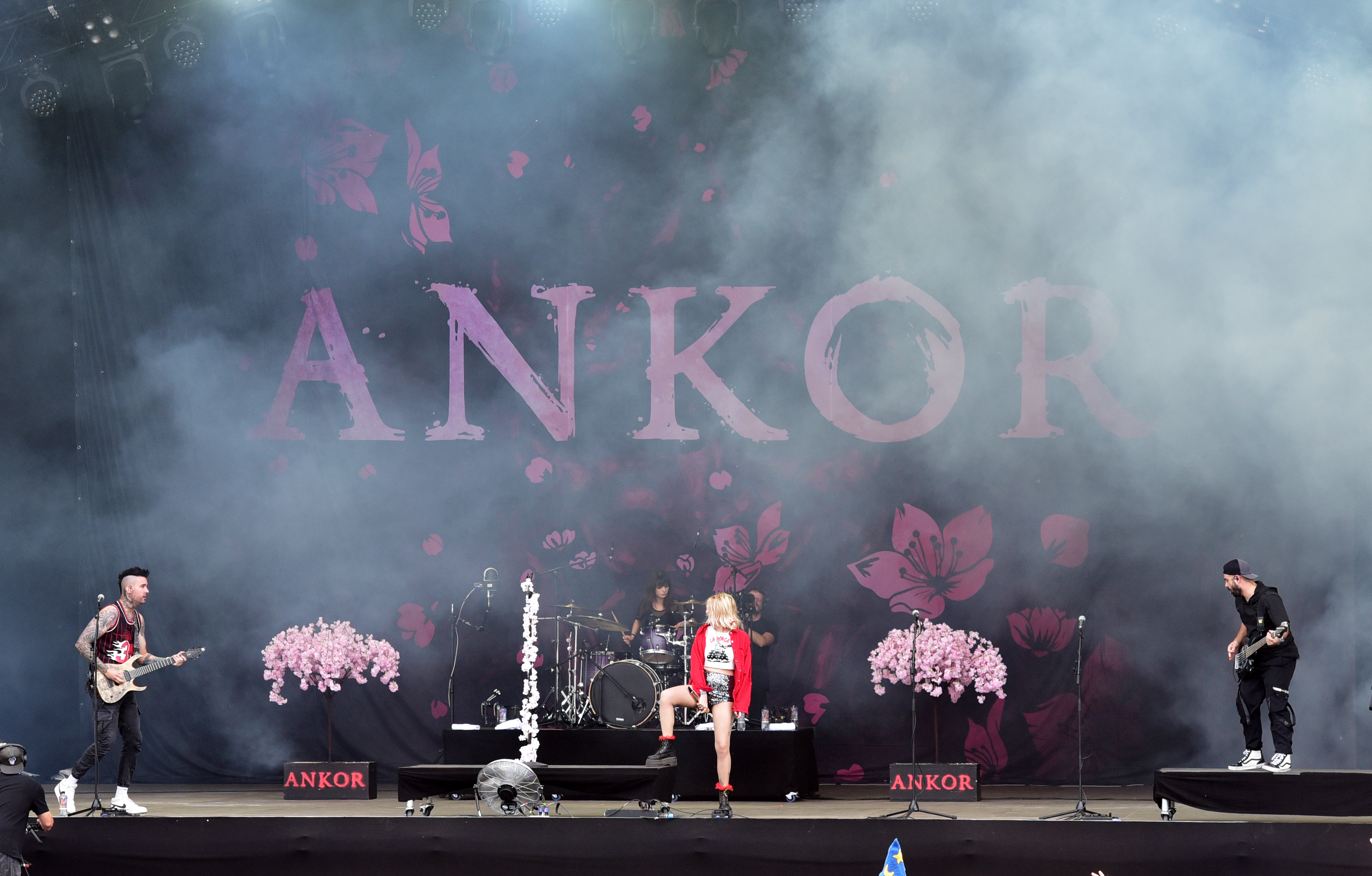
- Ankor at Wacken Open Air 2024

Background information
- Origin: Catalonia, Spain
- Genres: Alternative metal; metalcore; power metal (early)
- Years active: 2003–present
- Labels: Rock Estatal; UNFD
- Members: Jessie Williams; Eleni Nota; David Romeu; Fito Martínez; Julio López
- Past members: José "Jossy" Alarcón; Alberto Muñoz; Juan "Expo" Expósito; Rosa De La Cruz; Javier "Rubio" Casanova; Jordi Vidal; Raphaela Tache
- Website: ankormusic.com

Ankor (stylised as ANKOR) is a Spanish alternative metal band from Catalonia, featuring vocalist Jessie Williams, drummer Eleni Nota, guitarists David Romeu and Fito Martínez, and bassist Julio López.

== History ==
=== Early years (2003–2013) ===
The band formed in 2003 in Els Pallaresos, a village near Barcelona, when its members were around 13 years old. The debut album, Al fin descansar, was released in 2008 on Santo Grial Records. It was heavy metal with power metal influences, sung entirely in Spanish by Rosa De La Cruz. The second album, My Own Angel (2011), switched to English lyrics and added punk and metalcore elements. It was followed by Last Song for Venus in 2013.

=== New vocalist and international touring (2014–2021) ===
In May 2014 De La Cruz left the band and was replaced by British vocalist Jessie Williams. Later that year the band released the EP Get on the Winner Horse!, which featured re-recorded songs with Williams. Williams has cited a lack of demand for metal music in Spain as the reason for focusing on the global market. Also in 2014, the readers of the Spanish and South American rock magazine La Heavy voted Ankor best newcomer band.

The fourth album, Beyond the Silence of These Years (2017), and White Dragon (2019) allowed the band to start headlining tours in Europe and Asia. White Dragon mixed metal, rock, rap, electronic and funk influences, and was mixed by Dan Korneff and mastered by Ted Jensen. In 2020 the band released several cover singles. In September and October 2021, after almost two years without live shows because of the COVID-19 pandemic, Ankor headlined the "Music Resurrection Tour" in Europe.

=== Shoganai and UNFD (2022–present) ===
In 2022 the band released the single "Prisoner", which passed three million streams. It was followed by the conceptually linked singles "Oblivion", "Darkbeat", "Stereo" and "Venom", each with its own music video. These releases helped the band reach large festivals such as Wacken Open Air, where they played in 2024.

In June 2024 Ankor signed with the Australian label UNFD and released the single "Embers". Williams described it as mixing EDM with classic Ankor melodies and as a song about loss and grief; the music video was filmed in a church in London. The singles were collected on Shoganai – Mini Album Vol. 1, released in October 2024 and named after a Japanese expression meaning roughly "it can't be helped". The lyrics and videos form a single story about the loss of a romantic partner.

In February and March 2025 Ankor played their biggest headline tour of Europe and the UK so far, visiting 17 countries. Further singles followed: "MADARA · endless dream" (September 2025), "NAGATO · purple eyes" (January 2026) and "DANZO · lying ghost" (March 2026), the last featuring MAH of the Japanese band SiM and inspired by the Naruto character Danzo Shimura. In December 2025 Ankor, along with Ladrones and The Pretty Wild, was announced as support for Bloodywood's 2026 US tour, the band's first tour of North America.

In October 2026 the band announced the album I See Red, scheduled for release on 20 November 2026 through UNFD, and released its lead single "ITACHI · blood moon". Each song on the album is based on a villain from Naruto, and it includes the earlier singles "MADARA", "NAGATO" and "DANZO".

== Musical style and influences ==
Originally a power metal band, they have since evolved their sound into alternative metal, fused together with metalcore and electronic music. In an interview with The Pretty Cult, Jessie Williams has cited Japanese culture as a significant influence on their music, as well as Falling in Reverse, Maximum the Hormone, hip-hop and even classical music.

== Members ==
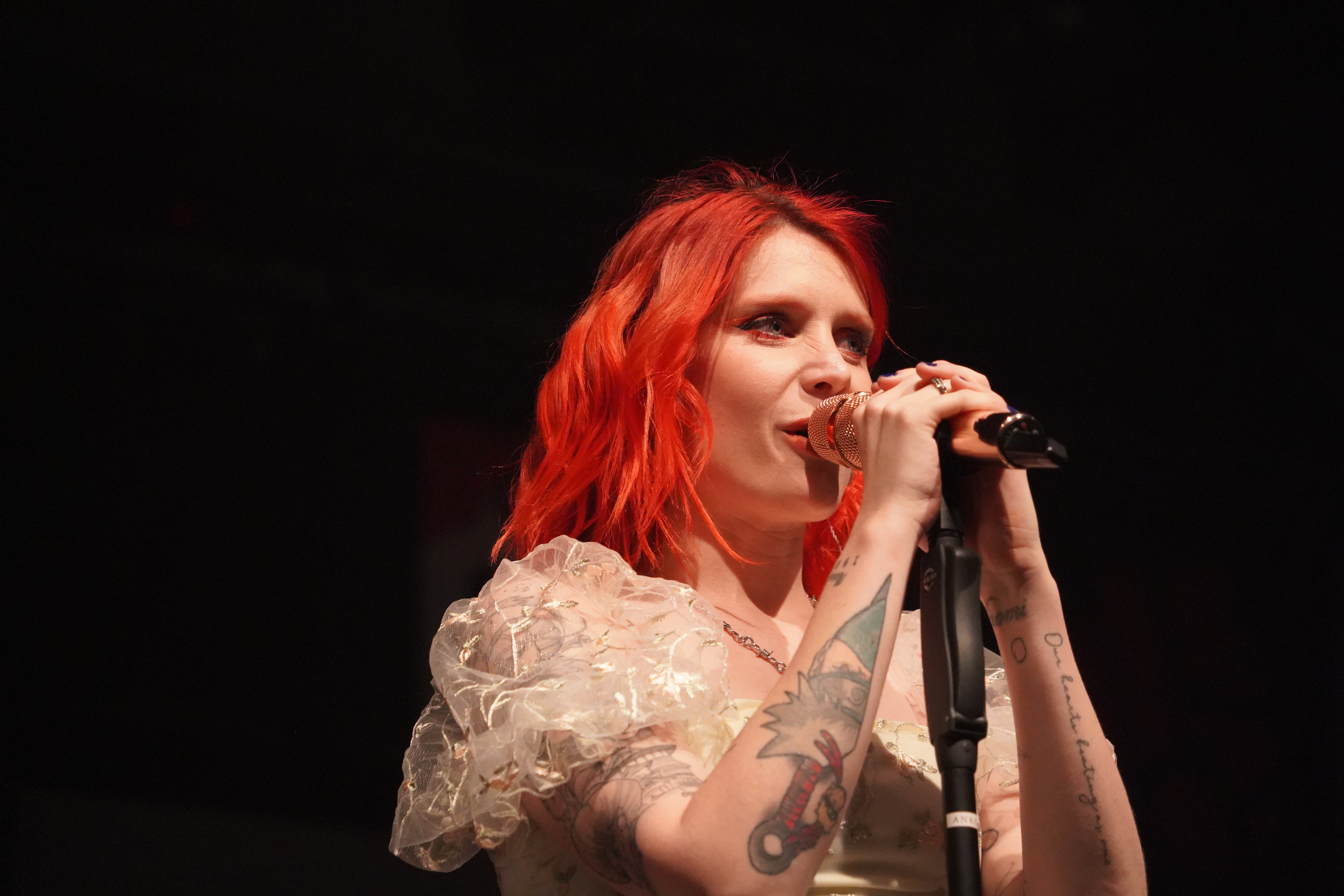
Jessie Williams

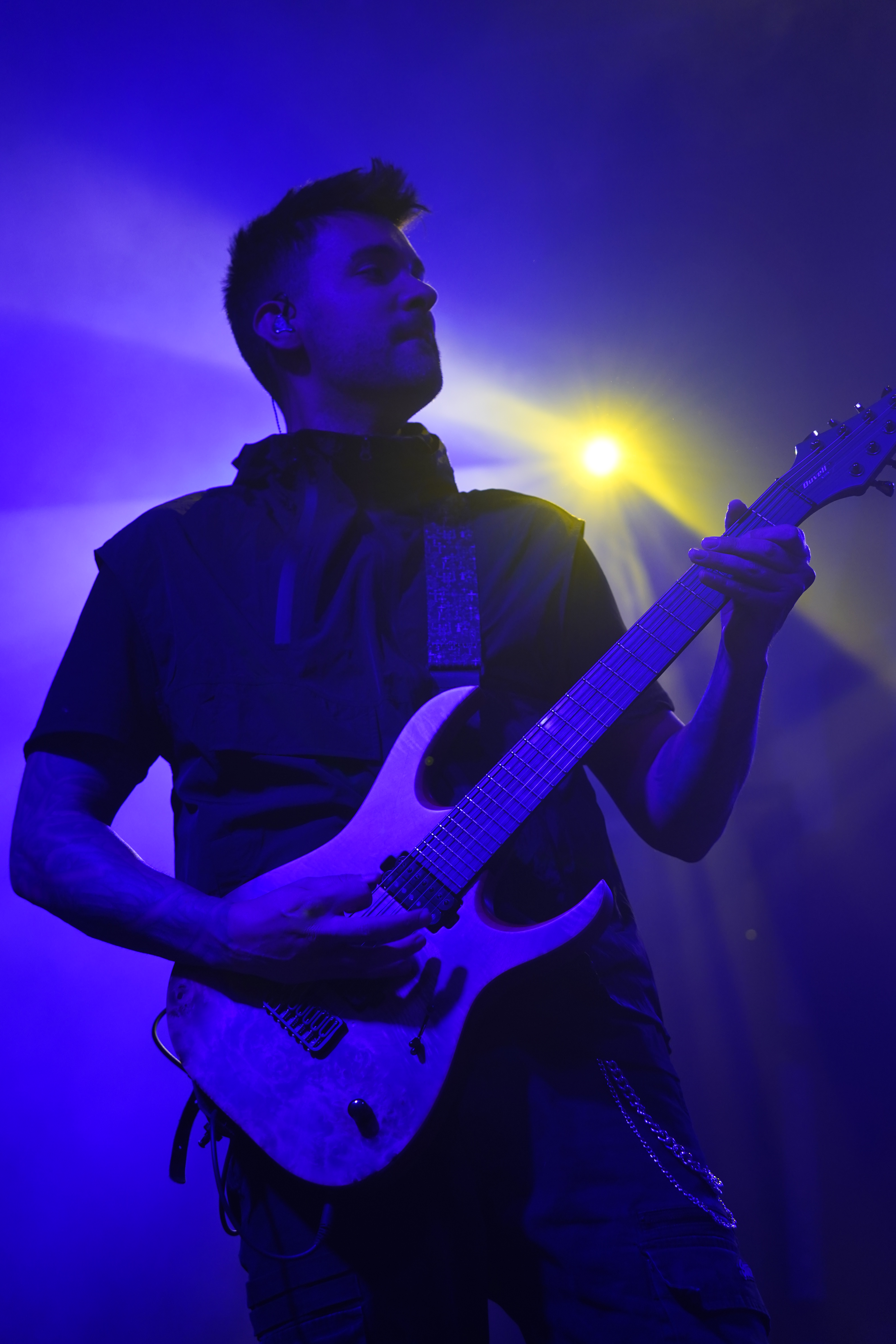
David Romeu

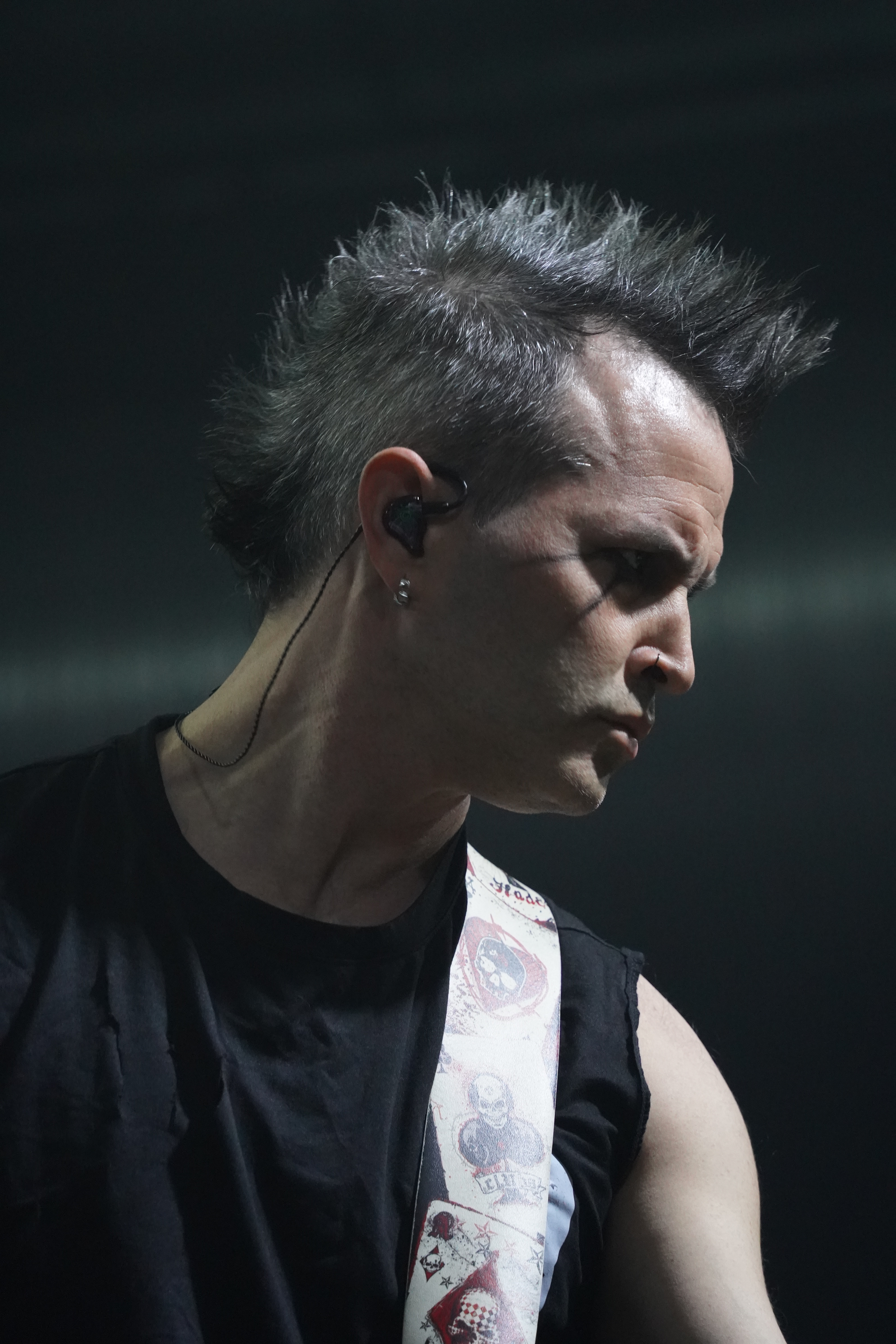
Fito Martínez

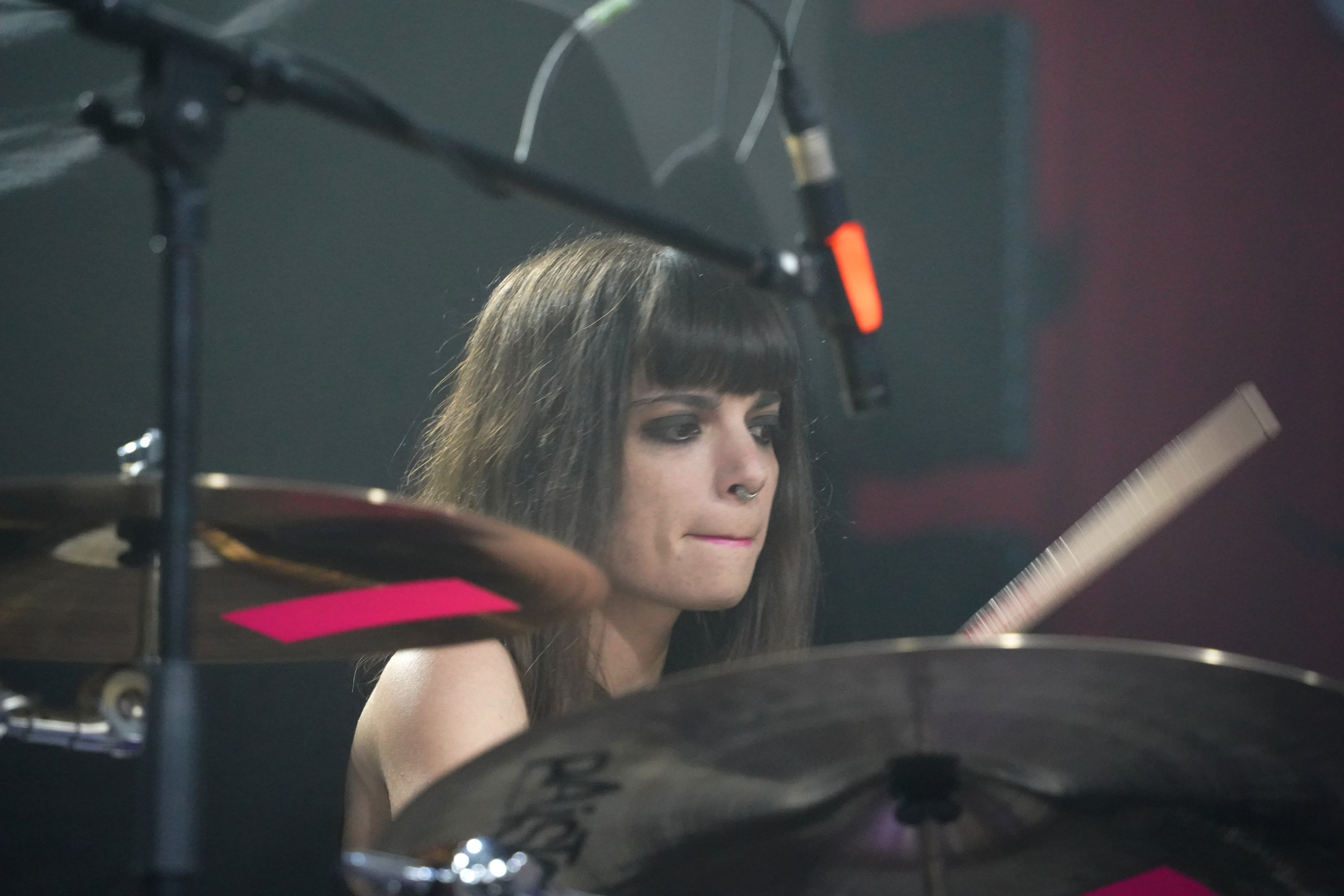
Eleni Nota

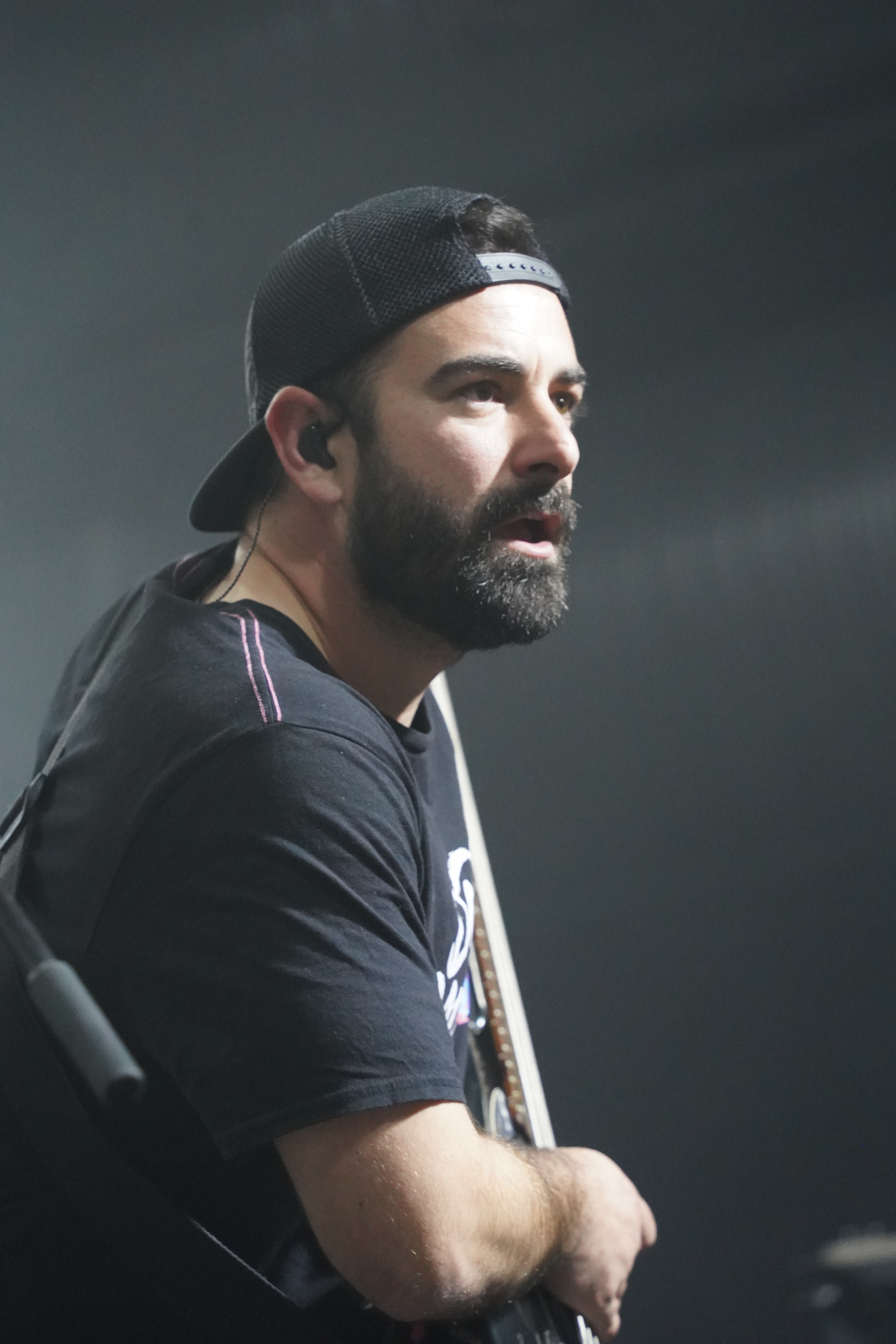
Julio López

Current

- David Romeu – guitars (2003–present)
- Julio Lopez – bass, backing and co-lead vocals (2009–2017, 2020–present)
- Fito Martínez – guitars (2011–present)
- Jessie Williams – lead vocals (2014–present)
- Eleni Nota – drums (2022–present)

Former

- José "Jossy" Alarcón – vocals, bass (2004–2008)
- Alberto Muñoz – vocals, bass (2008–2009)
- Juan "Expo" Expósito – guitar (2003–2011)
- Rosa De La Cruz – lead vocals (2003–2014)
- Javier "Rubio" Casanova – keyboards (2003–2015)
- Jordi Vidal – drums, violin (2004–2016)
- Raphaela Tache – drums, keyboards, backing vocals (2016–2022)

Timeline

== Discography ==
=== Studio albums ===
- Al fin descansar (2008)
- My Own Angel (2011)
- Last Song for Venus (2013)
- Beyond the Silence of These Years (2017)
- White Dragon (2019)
- Shoganai – Mini Album Vol. 1 (2024)
- I See Red (2026)

=== EPs ===
- Demo (2005)
- No + Dolor (2007)
- Get on the Winner Horse! (2014)
