= Bloodywood =

Indian metal band

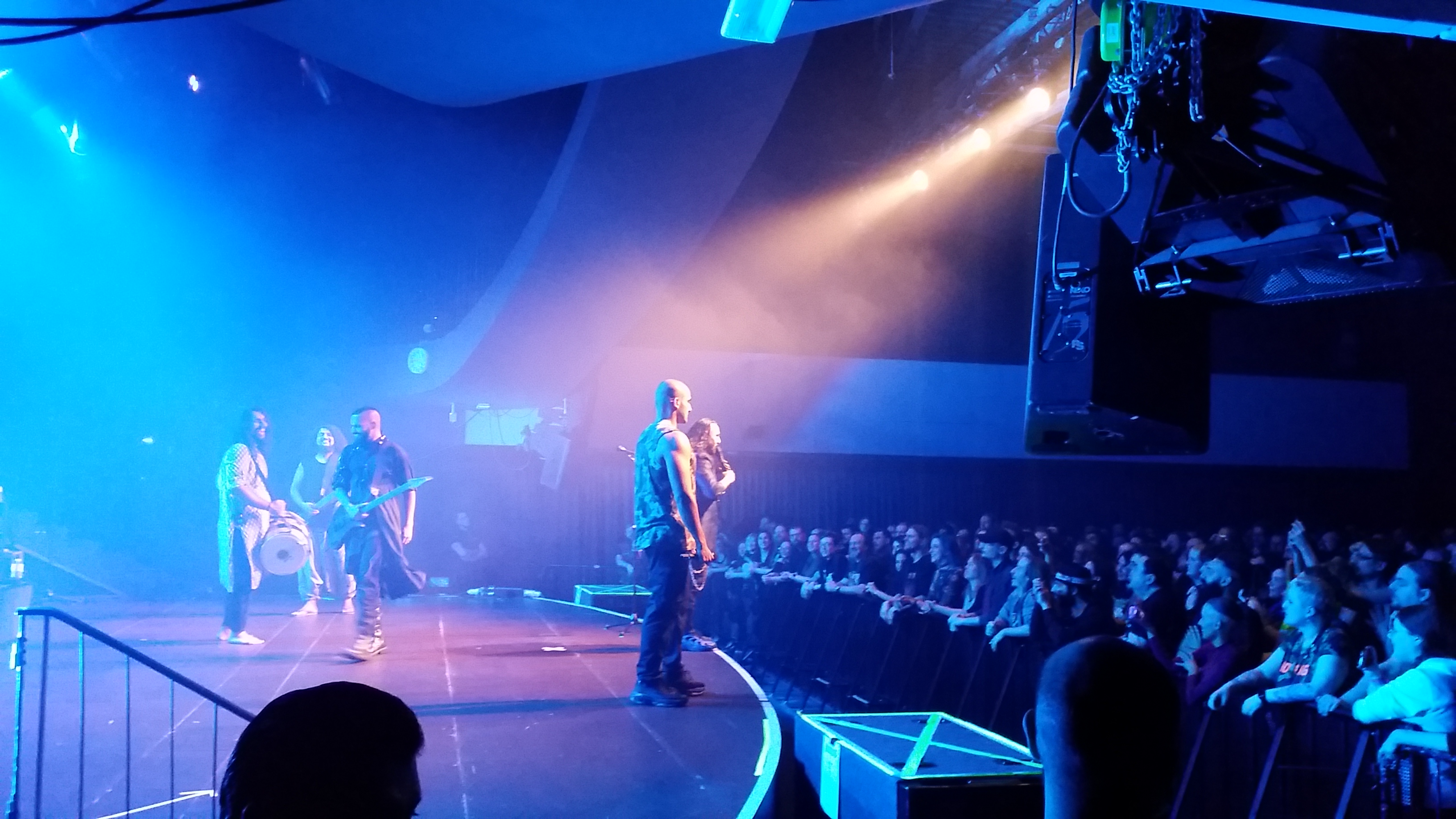
- Bloodywood performing in 2023

Background information
- Origin: New Delhi, India
- Genres: Nu metal; folk metal; rap metal; metalcore; comedy metal (early)
- Years active: 2016–present
- Label: Fearless
- Members: Karan Katiyar; Jayant Bhadula; Raoul Kerr
- Website: bloodywood.net

Bloodywood is an Indian metal band from New Delhi, formed in 2016. Their style is primarily described as nu metal but also includes elements of folk metal and metalcore. They began as a parody band that uploaded metal covers of pop songs on YouTube and later wrote their own music. They have become India's first metal act to chart on Billboard.

== History ==
=== Foundation and early years ===
Prior to forming the band, Karan Katiyar regularly uploaded parody metal covers of popular Bollywood songs on YouTube, but he had trouble finding a suitable vocalist. At a local gig, Katiyar met Jayant Bhadula, who worked as a talent manager at an entertainment company, and was impressed by his vocal range and versatility. In 2016, Katiyar quit his job as a corporate lawyer and together with Bhadula formed a two-piece band with the intention of "destroying pop songs".

In 2017, Bloodywood re-recorded Linkin Park's song "Heavy" in Linkin Park's early nu metal style, catching the attention of many music websites such as Loudwire and Metal Hammer, the latter of which declared it "what Linkin Park's Heavy should have sounded like." The band made more covers in 2017 and released the compilation cover album Anti-Pop Vol. 1 on their Bandcamp page. This was followed by a metal cover version of the popular Bhangra/Indi-pop song "Tunak Tunak Tun" by Daler Mehndi, featuring guest vocals from Bonde do Metaleiro.

In 2018, Bloodywood released "Ari Ari", a cover of the Bhangra song "Ari Ari" by the duo Bombay Rockers, which itself was a version of the Indian folk song "Baari Barsi". The track featured rapper Raoul Kerr, whom Katiyar had invited to take part after working on a lyric video for him. The song's initial exposure was provided by Bollywood actress Ileana D'Cruz, who shared the video of "Ari Ari" on her social media. The positive reception from fans encouraged the band to write original material and draw more inspiration from Indian folk music. In July of the same year, Bloodywood partnered with online counselling site HopeTherapy and released the song "Jee Veerey", dedicated to fighting depression and mental illness.

On 15 January 2019, the band released "Endurant", a song dealing with the topic of bullying. On 21 April, it was announced that Bloodywood would perform at the German heavy metal festival Wacken Open Air. Two days later, the band released the song "Machi Bhasad (Expect a Riot)", initially intended for the upcoming Ubisoft game Beyond Good and Evil 2. At the same time, Bloodywood announced that Kerr had become a permanent member of the band and that Bloodywood was embarking on their Raj Against the Machine Tour.

=== Rakshak and Nu Delhi ===
In 2021, Bloodywood was named one of the "12 new metal bands to watch in 2022" by the heavy metal and rock music magazine Metal Hammer. They were also nominated for the Breakthrough Asian Band title at the 2021 Global Metal Apocalypse awards, finishing second. Bloodywood's debut studio album, titled Rakshak, and was released on 18 February 2022. Lyrically, it tackles social and political topics, such as the track "Dana-Dan", which discusses rape and sexual assault.

On 18 October 2024, it was announced that the band had signed with Fearless Records. This was followed by the release of the new single "Nu Delhi" and the confirmation of a 2025 European tour. On 6 December, Bloodywood issued the single "Bekhauf", which featured the Japanese kawaii metal band Babymetal. Bloodywood released their second studio album, Nu Delhi, on 21 March 2025. In July, Bloodywood was featured in Babymetal's single "Kon! Kon!", from the album Metal Forth.

In 2026, Bloodywood launched their System of a Brown tour across the United States, which featured support from Ladrones, the Pretty Wild, and Ankor.

== Musical style ==
Bloodywood's music has been described as nu metal, folk metal, rap metal, and metalcore.

== Social work ==
Along with the messages included in their songs, the band aims to support various social/charity causes. With the release of the video for their song "Jee Veerey", they gave away pre-paid online counselling sessions. In a 2023 interview, Kerr claimed that the band's goal was "to channel their angst for the right causes and make people want to do something about them".

Upon returning to India from their 2019 European tour, Bloodywood donated the earnings to Posh Foundation, a local NGO that cares for homeless animals, for the purchase of a new ambulance.

== Band members ==
- Karan Katiyar – guitars, flute, production, composition (2016–present)
- Jayant Bhadula – vocals, growls (2016–present)
- Raoul Kerr – rap vocals (2019–present; session musician 2018–2019)

Touring members

- Sarthak Pahwa – dhol (2019–present)
- Roshan Roy – bass (2019–present)
- Vishesh Singh – drums (2019–present)

== Discography ==
=== Studio albums ===
- Anti-Pop Vol. 1 (2017)
- Rakshak (2022)
- Nu Delhi (2025)

=== Singles ===
- "Angry Santa" (2017)
- "Friday The 13th" (2017)
- "Punjabi Metal" (2017)
- "Tunak Tunak Metal" feat. Bonde do Metaleiro (2018)
- "Rang De Basanti" (2018)
- "Ari Ari" (2018)
- "Jee Veerey" (2018)
- "Endurant" (2019)
- "Machi Bhasad" (2019)
- "Yaad" (2020)
- "Great Is Born Raw" with the Snake Charmer (2021)
- "Gaddaar" (2021)
- "Aaj" (2022)
- "Dana-Dan" (2022)
- "Nu Delhi" (2024)
- "Bekhauf" feat. Babymetal (2024)
- "Tadka" (2025)

=== Videos ===
- "Angry Santa" (2017)
- "Tunak Tunak Tun" feat. Bonde do Metaleiro (2018)
- "Rang De Basanti" (2018)
- "Ari Ari" (2018)
- "Jee Veerey" (2018)
- "Endurant" (2019)
- "Machi Bhasad" (2019)
- "Yaad" (2020)
- "Gaddaar" (2021)
- "Aaj" (2022)
- "Dana-Dan" (2022)
- "Nu Delhi" (2024)
- "Bekhauf" feat. Babymetal (2024)
- "Tadka" (2025)
