= Nu Delhi =

Studio album by Bloodywood
- Released: 21 March 2025
- Genres: Nu metal; Indian folk music; folk metal
- Length: 33:07
- Languages: English; Hindi; Japanese
- Label: Fearless

Bloodywood chronology
Rakshak (2022)	Nu Delhi (2025)

Singles from Nu Delhi
- 1. "Nu Delhi" Released: 18 September 2024; 2. "Bekhauf" Released: 6 December 2024; 3. "Tadka" Released: 31 January 2025

Nu Delhi is the second studio album by the Indian heavy metal band Bloodywood. It was released on 21 March 2025.

== Background and themes ==
The album is a tribute to the musical scene of Delhi, from which the band originates. In a Kerrang! interview, Jayant Bhadula states:

"We always try to advocate for things that are close to us. With Nu Delhi, we wanted to let the world know that there is this thriving music scene – not just metal – in India, which is on par with what's happening in the world. The first single, Nu Delhi itself, is a love letter from us to this city."

The third single, "Tadka", released at the end of January 2025, is a reference to the South Asian cooking method of the same name: "It's about going the extra mile in the pursuit of a greater flavour," wrote the band in a statement accompanying the single.

== Track listing ==
Nu Delhi track listing
No.	Title	Length
1.	"Halla Bol" ("Raise Your Voice")	5:29
2.	"Hutt" ("Move")	4:34
3.	"Dhadak" ("Heartbeat")	3:09
4.	"Bekhauf" ("Fearless"; featuring Babymetal)	3:48
5.	"Kismat" ("Destiny")	3:45
6.	"Daggebaaz" ("Deceiver")	3:29
7.	"Tadka"	4:22
8.	"Nu Delhi"	4:28
Total length:		33:07

== Charts ==
Chart performance for Nu Delhi
Chart (2025)	Peak position
Austrian Albums (Ö3 Austria)	68
German Albums (Offizielle Top 100)	85
Japanese International Albums (Oricon)	15
Japanese Rock Albums (Oricon)	15
Scottish Albums (Official Charts)	19
Swiss Albums (Schweizer Hitparade)	46
UK Album Downloads (Official Charts)	7
UK Albums Sales (OCC)	20
UK Rock & Metal Albums (Official Charts)	4
US Top Current Album Sales (Billboard)	41
US World Albums (Billboard)	13
