= Arkalon, Kansas =

Ghost town in Seward County, Kansas

- Ghost town
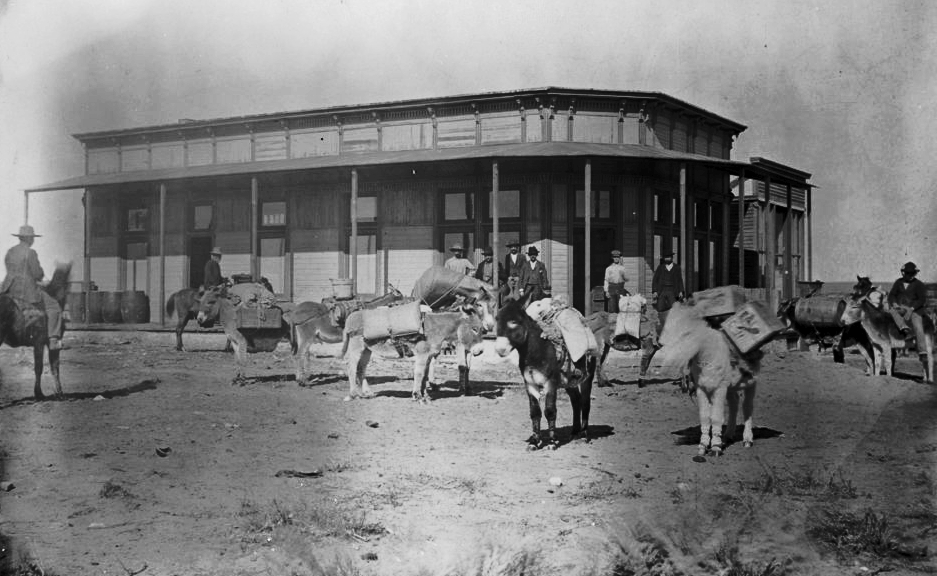
- A pack train of burros in front of the bank in Arkalon (circa 1880–1899)

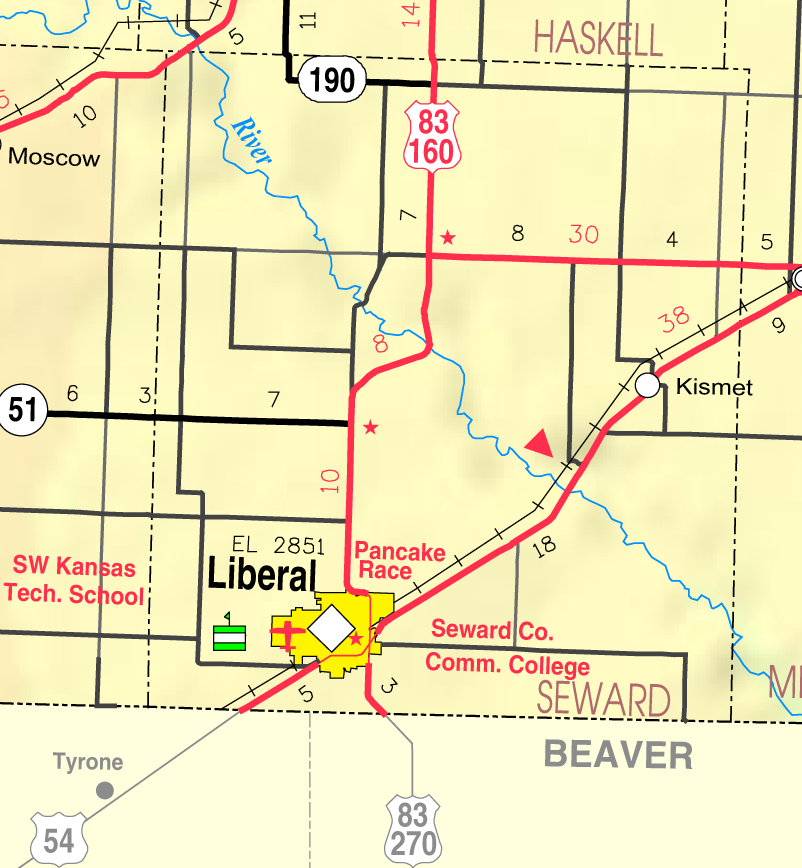
- KDOT map of Seward County (legend)

- Location within Kansas Location within the United States
- Coordinates: 37°8′35″N 100°48′27″W
- Country: United States
- State: Kansas
- County: Seward
- Founded: 1888
- Platted: 1888
- Named for: Arkalon Tenney
- Elevation: 2,618 ft (798 m)

Population
  - Total: 0
- Time zone: UTC-6 (CST)
  - Summer (DST): UTC-5 (CDT)
- Area code: 620
- FIPS code: 20-02290
- GNIS ID: 484534

Arkalon is a ghost town in Seward County, Kansas, United States. It was located northeast of Liberal on the west side of the Cimarron River.

== History ==
After the Chicago, Kansas and Nebraska Railway built through the area in 1888, a townsite sprang up and platted in 1888. The town was named Arkalon for Arkalon Tenney, the father of the first postmaster of the town, Hosea Eugene Tenney. A post office called Arkalon was established in 1888 and remained in operation until 1929.

The Arkalon News newspaper was published from April 1888 until December 1892. In 1891, a one-room school house was opened for children. A large stockyard was erected for shipping cattle to market. While the nearby river held promise for the early settlers, they soon found that the bottom land next the Cimarron River was too sandy for farming and flooded too often. By the 1920s most of the early settlers had left, leaving only the railroad and stockyards behind.
