= Fatality =

Fatality may refer to:

- Fatality (Mortal Kombat), a finishing move in the Mortal Kombat series of fighting games
- Fatality (character), a character published by DC Comics
- Fatal1ty, the screen name of professional electronic sports player Johnathan Wendel

== See also ==
- Casualty (person)
- Fatal (disambiguation)
- Lethality, a term designating the ability of a weapon to kill
- Mortality (disambiguation)
- Category:Death-related lists - lists of fatalities
