= Plains, Kansas =

City in Meade County, Kansas

- City
- Location within Meade County and Kansas

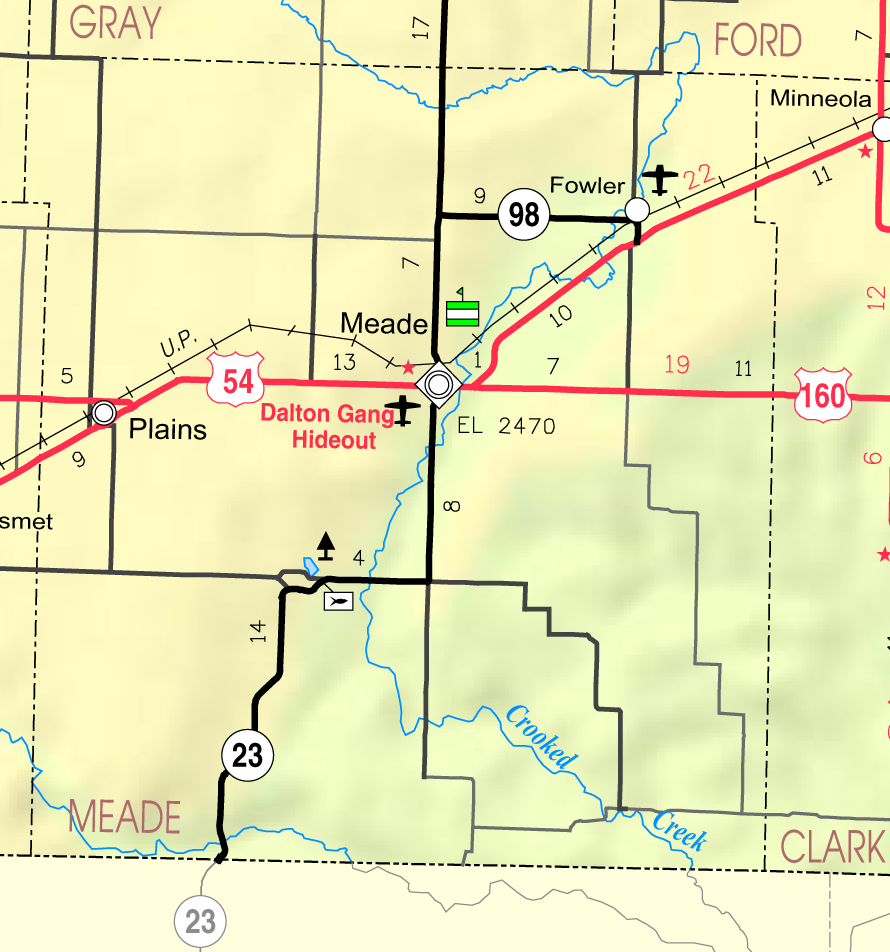
- KDOT map of Meade County (legend)
- Coordinates: 37°15′51″N 100°35′23″W
- Country: United States
- State: Kansas
- County: Meade
- Founded: 1800s
- Platted: 1885
- Incorporated: 1908

Area
  - Total: 1.00 sq mi (2.59 km^{2})
  - Land: 1.00 sq mi (2.59 km^{2})
  - Water: 0 sq mi (0.00 km^{2})
- Elevation: 2,759 ft (841 m)

Population (2020)
  - Total: 1,037
  - Density: 1,040/sq mi (400/km^{2})
- Time zone: UTC-6 (CST)
  - Summer (DST): UTC-5 (CDT)
- ZIP Code: 67869
- Area code: 620
- FIPS code: 20-56100
- GNIS ID: 2396219
- Website: plains.krwa.net

Plains is a city in Meade County, Kansas, United States. As of the 2020 census, the population of the city was 1,037. It is located along U.S. Route 54 highway. Plains is notable for the width of its main street, which is the widest in the United States at 155 feet 5 inches (47.37 m) across.

== History ==
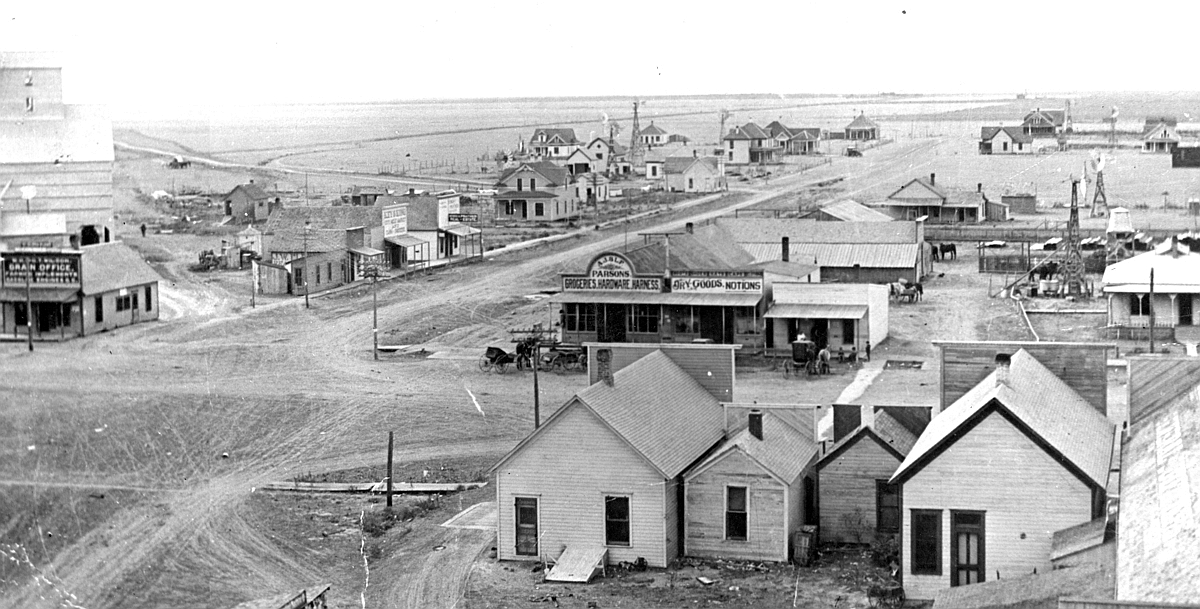
Plains in early 1900s

Plains was originally called West Plains, and under the latter name was platted in January 1885.

== Geography ==
According to the United States Census Bureau, the city has a total area of 1.00 square mile (2.59 km^{2}), all land.

=== Climate ===
According to the Köppen Climate Classification system, Plains has a semi-arid climate, abbreviated "BSk" on climate maps.

== Demographics ==
Historical population
Census	Pop.	Note	%±
1890	62		—
1910	333		—
1920	361		8.4%
1930	383		6.1%
1940	619		61.6%
1950	718		16.0%
1960	780		8.6%
1970	857		9.9%
1980	1,044		21.8%
1990	957		−8.3%
2000	1,163		21.5%
2010	1,146		−1.5%
2020	1,037		−9.5%
U.S. Decennial Census

=== 2020 census ===
The 2020 United States census counted 1,037 people, 367 households, and 268 families in Plains. The population density was 1,038.0 per square mile (400.8/km^{2}). There were 433 housing units at an average density of 433.4 per square mile (167.3/km^{2}). The racial makeup was 65.0% (674) white or European American (54.19% non-Hispanic white), 0.1% (1) black or African-American, 0.0% (0) Native American or Alaska Native, 0.0% (0) Asian, 0.0% (0) Pacific Islander or Native Hawaiian, 17.65% (183) from other races, and 17.26% (179) from two or more races. Hispanic or Latino of any race was 43.01% (446) of the population.

Of the 367 households, 41.7% had children under the age of 18; 58.0% were married couples living together; 22.3% had a female householder with no spouse or partner present. 23.4% of households consisted of individuals and 8.2% had someone living alone who was 65 years of age or older. The average household size was 2.8 and the average family size was 3.0. The percent of those with a bachelor's degree or higher was estimated to be 13.2% of the population.

32.3% of the population was under the age of 18, 8.4% from 18 to 24, 25.6% from 25 to 44, 21.4% from 45 to 64, and 12.3% who were 65 years of age or older. The median age was 31.8 years. For every 100 females, there were 95.3 males. For every 100 females ages 18 and older, there were 107.1 males.

The 2016–2020 5-year American Community Survey estimates show that the median household income was $64,074 (with a margin of error of +/- $5,226) and the median family income was $69,398 (+/- $8,290). Males had a median income of $56,454 (+/- $5,263) versus $19,583 (+/- $10,756) for females. The median income for those above 16 years old was $43,641 (+/- $3,929). Approximately, 19.8% of families and 14.6% of the population were below the poverty line, including 19.2% of those under the age of 18 and 7.9% of those ages 65 or over.

=== 2010 census ===
At the 2010 census, there were 1,146 people, 385 households and 310 families residing in the city. The population density was 1,146.0 inhabitants per square mile (442.5/km^{2}). There were 439 housing units at an average density of 439.0 per square mile (169.5/km^{2}). The racial makeup of the city was 88.1% White, 0.3% African American, 1.0% Native American, 0.4% Asian, 8.5% from other races, and 1.7% from two or more races. Hispanic or Latino of any race were 36.0% of the population.

There were 385 households, of which 42.9% had children under the age of 18 living with them, 67.3% were married couples living together, 8.3% had a female householder with no husband present, 4.9% had a male householder with no wife present, and 19.5% were non-families. 18.2% of all households were made up of individuals, and 6.5% had someone living alone who was 65 years of age or older. The average household size was 2.98 and the average family size was 3.38.

The median age in the city was 30.9 years. 33.9% of residents were under the age of 18; 8.8% were between the ages of 18 and 24; 25.9% were from 25 to 44; 21.6% were from 45 to 64; and 9.8% were 65 years of age or older. The gender makeup of the city was 51.8% male and 48.2% female.

== Education ==
The community is served by Southwestern Heights USD 483 public school district. Its high school, Southwestern Heights, is located between Kismet and Plains along U.S. Route 54 highway. The Southwestern Heights High School mascot is Southwestern Heights Mustangs.
