= Kismet, Kansas =

City in Seward County, Kansas

- City
- Location within Seward County and Kansas

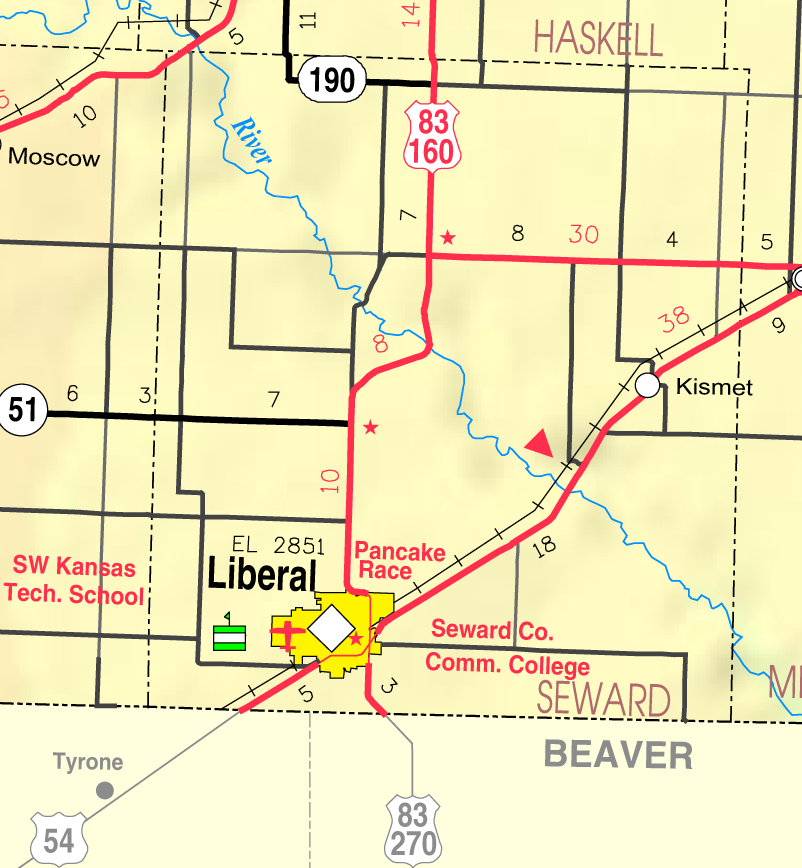
- KDOT map of Seward County (legend)
- Coordinates: 37°12′16″N 100°42′06″W
- Country: United States
- State: Kansas
- County: Seward
- Founded: 1880s
- Incorporated: 1929

Area
  - Total: 0.24 sq mi (0.61 km^{2})
  - Land: 0.24 sq mi (0.61 km^{2})
  - Water: 0 sq mi (0.00 km^{2})
- Elevation: 2,779 ft (847 m)

Population (2020)
  - Total: 340
  - Density: 1,400/sq mi (560/km^{2})
- Time zone: UTC-6 (CST)
  - Summer (DST): UTC-5 (CDT)
- ZIP Code: 67859
- Area code: 620
- FIPS code: 20-37325
- GNIS ID: 2395552

Kismet is a city in Seward County, Kansas, United States. As of the 2020 census, the population of the city was 340. It is located along U.S. Route 54 highway.

== History ==
The first post office in Kismet was established in November 1888.

== Geography ==
According to the United States Census Bureau, the city has a total area of 0.24 square miles (0.62 km^{2}), all land.

== Demographics ==
Historical population
| Census | Pop. | Note | %± |
|---|---|---|---|
| 1940 | 227 | | — |
| 1950 | 180 | | −20.7% |
| 1960 | 150 | | −16.7% |
| 1970 | 294 | | 96.0% |
| 1980 | 368 | | 25.2% |
| 1990 | 421 | | 14.4% |
| 2000 | 484 | | 15.0% |
| 2010 | 459 | | −5.2% |
| 2020 | 340 | | −25.9% |
U.S. Decennial Census

=== 2020 census ===
The 2020 United States census counted 340 people, 124 households, and 101 families in Kismet. The population density was 1,440.7 per square mile (556.2/km^{2}). There were 154 housing units at an average density of 652.5 per square mile (251.9/km^{2}). The racial makeup was 69.12% (235) white or European American (59.71% non-Hispanic white), 0.88% (3) black or African-American, 2.94% (10) Native American or Alaska Native, 1.76% (6) Asian, 0.0% (0) Pacific Islander or Native Hawaiian, 14.12% (48) from other races, and 11.18% (38) from two or more races. Hispanic or Latino of any race was 32.94% (112) of the population.

Of the 124 households, 40.3% had children under the age of 18; 58.9% were married couples living together; 18.5% had a female householder with no spouse or partner present. 16.9% of households consisted of individuals and 8.9% had someone living alone who was 65 years of age or older. The average household size was 2.7 and the average family size was 2.9. The percent of those with a bachelor's degree or higher was estimated to be 21.8% of the population.

26.2% of the population was under the age of 18, 8.8% from 18 to 24, 24.7% from 25 to 44, 23.5% from 45 to 64, and 16.8% who were 65 years of age or older. The median age was 37.5 years. For every 100 females, there were 102.4 males. For every 100 females ages 18 and older, there were 110.9 males.

The 2016–2020 5-year American Community Survey estimates show that the median household income was $58,542 (with a margin of error of +/- $8,709) and the median family income was $60,625 (+/- $13,870). Males had a median income of $40,000 (+/- $7,799) versus $15,625 (+/- $14,835) for females. The median income for those above 16 years old was $32,386 (+/- $10,772). Approximately, 7.6% of families and 10.5% of the population were below the poverty line, including 22.8% of those under the age of 18 and 7.8% of those ages 65 or over.

=== 2010 census ===
As of the census of 2010, there were 459 people, 145 households, and 115 families residing in the city. The population density was 1,912.5 inhabitants per square mile (738.4/km^{2}). There were 155 housing units at an average density of 645.8 per square mile (249.3/km^{2}). The racial makeup of the city was 86.1% White, 0.7% African American, 1.5% Native American, 0.4% Asian, 9.4% from other races, and 2.0% from two or more races. Hispanic or Latino of any race were 35.5% of the population.

There were 145 households, of which 48.3% had children under the age of 18 living with them, 67.6% were married couples living together, 9.0% had a female householder with no husband present, 2.8% had a male householder with no wife present, and 20.7% were non-families. 19.3% of all households were made up of individuals, and 9% had someone living alone who was 65 years of age or older. The average household size was 3.17 and the average family size was 3.64.

The median age in the city was 29.1 years. 37.9% of residents were under the age of 18; 7.2% were between the ages of 18 and 24; 26.6% were from 25 to 44; 18.2% were from 45 to 64; and 10.2% were 65 years of age or older. The gender makeup of the city was 52.5% male and 47.5% female.

== Education ==
The community is served by Southwestern Heights USD 483 public school district. Its high school, Southwestern Heights, is located between Kismet and Plains along U.S. Route 54 highway. The Southwestern Heights High School mascot is Southwestern Heights Mustangs.

Kismet High School was closed through school unification. The Kismet High School mascot was Kismet Pirates.
