= List of United States tornadoes in May 2015 =

This is a list of all tornadoes that were confirmed by local offices of the National Weather Service in the United States in May 2015.

== May ==
Confirmed tornadoes by Enhanced Fujita rating
EFU	EF0	EF1	EF2	EF3	EF4	EF5	Total
0	241	114	19	8	0	0	382

=== May 3 event ===
List of confirmed tornadoes – Sunday, May 3, 2015 (Note: All dates are based on the local time zone where the tornado touched down; however, all times are in Coordinated Universal Time for consistency.)
EF#	Location	County / Parish	State	Start Coord.	Time (UTC)	Path length	Max width	Damage (2015 USD)
EF0	E of Terril	Dickinson	IA	43.31°N 94.93°W	2234 – 2236	0.25 mi (0.40 km)	50 yd (46 m)	$0
EF0	A brief tornado moved across open fields.							
EF0	NE of Adams	Lancaster	NE	40.5542°N 96.6322°W	0133 – 0135	0.3 mi (0.48 km)	100 yd (91 m)	$0
EF0	Storm chasers observed a brief tornado.							

=== May 4 event ===
List of confirmed tornadoes – Monday, May 4, 2015
EF#	Location	County / Parish	State	Start Coord.	Time (UTC)	Path length	Max width	Damage (2015 USD)
EF1	N of Pierceville	Finney	KS	38.0284°N 100.6573°W	2358 – 0015	4.46 mi (7.18 km)	200 yd (180 m)	$0
EF1	Power poles were damaged.							
EF0	NNE of Pierceville	Finney	KS	38.03°N 100.6246°W	0001 – 0005	1.22 mi (1.96 km)	50 yd (46 m)	$0
EF0	A storm chaser reported a brief landspout tornado.							
EF0	N of Pierceville	Finney	KS	38.0638°N 100.6858°W	0004 – 0007	0.97 mi (1.56 km)	50 yd (46 m)	$0
EF0	A storm chaser reported a brief tornado.							

=== May 5 event ===
List of confirmed tornadoes – Tuesday, May 5, 2015
EF#	Location	County / Parish	State	Start Coord.	Time (UTC)	Path length	Max width	Damage (2015 USD)
EF0	W of Roswell	Chaves	NM	33.3708°N 104.5708°W	1855 – 1856	0.15 mi (0.24 km)	15 yd (14 m)	$20,000
EF0	A cold air funnel briefly touched down, damaging the roofs and walls of two outbuildings.							
EF1	N of Big Spring	Howard	TX	32.4493°N 101.5473°W	2023 – 2050	8.12 mi (13.07 km)	150 yd (140 m)	$5,000
EF1	A couple of power poles were snapped near their bases.							
EF0	SSW of Ralls	Crosby	TX	33.57°N 101.41°W	0024 – 0027	0.25 mi (0.40 km)	30 yd (27 m)	$0
EF0	A storm chaser observed a brief tornado over open land.							
EF0	NNE of Southland	Crosby	TX	33.48°N 101.43°W	0027 – 0033	2.3 mi (3.7 km)	100 yd (91 m)	$0
EF0	A storm chaser observed a tornado crossing Texas State Highway 207.							
EF0	N of Sterling City	Sterling	TX	32.032°N 101.0334°W	0059 – 0100	0.83 mi (1.34 km)	50 yd (46 m)	$0
EF0	The public observed a brief tornado on Texas State Highway 163.							
EF0	SSW of Silver	Coke	TX	32.0221°N 100.7302°W	0217 – 0224	1.09 mi (1.75 km)	50 yd (46 m)	$0
EF0	Law enforcement reported a brief tornado with multiple touchdowns.							

=== May 6 event ===
List of confirmed tornadoes – Wednesday, May 6, 2015
EF#	Location	County / Parish	State	Start Coord.	Time (UTC)	Path length	Max width	Damage (2015 USD)
EF0	S of Kellyville	Creek	OK	35.8656°N 96.2274°W	0758 – 0800	1.5 mi (2.4 km)	100 yd (91 m)	$0
EF0	A couple of hardwood trees were split and large tree limbs were downed.							
EF0	Lincoln	Lincoln	KS	38.9057°N 98.1893°W	1924 – 1937	10.72 mi (17.25 km)	100 yd (91 m)	$25,000
EF0	A sheet metal roof was blown across the street at a farmstead. Several trees were snapped in a cemetery.							
EF0	ENE of Apache	Caddo	OK	34.89°N 98.3159°W	1945 – 1947	2 mi (3.2 km)	50 yd (46 m)	$0
EF0	Trees were damaged.							
EF0	NW of Cyril	Caddo	OK	34.9409°N 98.2499°W	1953 – 1955	0.5 mi (0.80 km)	50 yd (46 m)	$0
EF0	A tornado was broadcast on live television via news helicopter.							
EF0	WSW of Ionia	Jewell	KS	39.6351°N 98.4373°W	2031 – 2034	1 mi (1.6 km)	25 yd (23 m)	$0
EF0	An off-duty National Weather Service employee reported a tornado.							
EF2	W of Mankato to N of Burr Oak	Jewell	KS	39.7781°N 98.3652°W	2055 – 2121	12.58 mi (20.25 km)	350 yd (320 m)	$1,500,000
EF2	At least four homes sustained damage to their roofs, windows, or siding, including one that had a large section of its roof removed. A garage was destroyed, with inside vehicles moved 30–50 ft (9.1–15.2 m). Other outbuildings, trees, power poles, and trees were damaged or destroyed.							
EF1	Roseland	Adams	NE	40.4321°N 98.5591°W	2118 – 2128	3.87 mi (6.23 km)	300 yd (270 m)	$1,500,000
EF1	Several homes and outbuildings sustained damage, of which two houses sustained considerable damage. One of those two homes was unanchored and slid off of its foundation, while the second lost its entire roof structure. A large metal building with wood post frame construction was destroyed. Widespread tree damage was observed, irrigation pivots were damaged, and a train car was derailed as well.							
EF3	E of Amber to NNE of Bridge Creek	Grady	OK	35.1576°N 97.8032°W	2133 - 2226	10.3 mi (16.6 km)	1,500 yd (1,400 m)	Unknown
EF3	A large multiple-vortex wedge tornado caused significant damage to numerous homes and other structures in Bridge Creek. Trees and power poles were snapped, mobile homes were completely destroyed, and frame homes were heavily damaged, a few of which lost roofs and exterior walls. One poorly anchored frame home was leveled, and vehicles from some residences were tossed over 100 yards away. A total of 1,500 homes and mobile home were damaged by the tornado, including 200 that were severely damaged or destroyed. Outbuildings were destroyed as well.							
EF0	S of Ringwood	Major	OK	36.3076°N 98.25°W	2137 – 2138	0.1 mi (0.16 km)	20 yd (18 m)	$0
EF0	Trained storm spotters reported a brief tornado.							
EF1	S of Bostwick to SSW of Nelson	Nuckolls	NE	40.0105°N 98.1705°W	2138 – 2154	9.47 mi (15.24 km)	200 yd (180 m)	$250,000
EF1	Pivots were overturned, power poles were snapped, and trees were damaged. A home sustained damage to its porch.							
EF2	ENE of Webber to NW of Deshler	Jewell (KS), Republic (KS), Nuckolls (NE)	KS, NE	39.9476°N 97.9662°W	2148 – 2219	20.12 mi (32.38 km)	400 yd (370 m)	$4,250,000
EF2	Numerous pivots were overturned, power poles were snapped, and widespread tree damage occurred. A few buildings sustained minor damage. Several outbuildings and grain bins were damaged or destroyed, and a few homes lost portions of their roofs in rural areas as well.							
EF0	E of Amber	Grady	OK	35.1877°N 97.7982°W	2148	0.3 mi (0.48 km)	50 yd (46 m)	$0
EF0	A storm chaser observed a satellite tornado in conjunction with the previous EF3 tornado east of Amber.							
EF3	SSE of Mount Hope to NE of Burrton	Sedgwick, Harvey	KS	37.8404°N 97.6507°W	2149 – 2217	16.48 mi (26.52 km)	300 yd (270 m)	$630,000
EF3	Three center pivot irrigation systems were damaged. At one farmstead, a single car detached garage was damaged and a carport was ripped from a barn. At a second farmstead, one home unsecured from its foundation was completely leveled, another home sustained significant damage, and a barn was rendered a complete loss. A small hog barn had its roof ripped off. Numerous trees were snapped or debarked.							
EF1	E of Formoso	Jewell	KS	39.7484°N 97.9644°W	2154 – 2204	4.28 mi (6.89 km)	250 yd (230 m)	$250,000
EF1	A home sustained roof, window, and siding damage, tree and power line damage was observed, and an outbuildings was destroyed.							
EF1	SE of Randall	Jewell	KS	39.583°N 97.9497°W	2204 – 2210	3.11 mi (5.01 km)	60 yd (55 m)	$5,000
EF1	Damage was confined to trees.							
EF1	NNW of Courtland	Republic	KS	39.814°N 97.93°W	2208 – 2215	2.13 mi (3.43 km)	75 yd (69 m)	Unknown
EF1	The first of twin tornadoes was reported by storm chasers.							
EF0	N of Courtland	Republic	KS	39.8563°N 97.8952°W	2210 – 2215	3.15 mi (5.07 km)	50 yd (46 m)	Unknown
EF0	The second of twin tornadoes was reported by storm chasers.							
EF0	SSW of Carrier	Garfield	OK	36.4533°N 98.0338°W	2215	0.1 mi (0.16 km)	10 yd (9.1 m)	$0
EF0	Trained storm spotters reported a brief tornado.							
EF2	S of Courtland to SE of Hebron	Republic, Thayer	KS, NE	39.6838°N 97.8974°W	2220 – 2319	36.24 mi (58.32 km)	800 yd (730 m)	$1,000,000
EF2	An ethanol plant and a home sustained EF2 damage, while a feedlot and several other houses were impacted less severely. Trees, power poles, and grain bins were damaged, pivots were overturned, and a house had its roof partially blown off.							
EF0	W of Carleton	Thayer	NE	40.2767°N 97.7467°W	2226 – 2230	1.79 mi (2.88 km)	100 yd (91 m)	$500,000
EF0	A few train cars and irrigation pivots were overturned.							
EF0	NNW of Byron	Thayer	NE	40.013°N 97.7821°W	2228 – 2231	1.04 mi (1.67 km)	30 yd (27 m)	$0
EF0	A tornado was confirmed using video and radar information.							
EF1	Southeastern Newcastle	McClain	OK	35.2202°N 97.5783°W	2233 – 2239	1 mi (1.6 km)	200 yd (180 m)	$0
EF1	Two outbuildings lost their roofs or were destroyed.							
EF0	N of Viola	Sedgwick	KS	37.56°N 97.63°W	2238 – 2240	0.32 mi (0.51 km)	50 yd (46 m)	$0
EF0	A storm chaser observed a brief tornado.							
EF0	W of Grand Island	Hall	NE	40.9107°N 98.4406°W	2245	0.01 mi (0.016 km)	25 yd (23 m)	$0
EF0	A trained storm spotter reported a brief tornado.							
EF0	Eastern Norman	McClain	OK	35.233°N 97.5344°W	2246 – 2247	0.5 mi (0.80 km)	25 yd (23 m)	$0
EF0	Damage to trees and fencing was observed.							
EF1	Northwestern Norman	Cleveland	OK	35.2453°N 97.4974°W	2253 – 2310	3.25 mi (5.23 km)	1,000 yd (910 m)	$0
EF1	Numerous trees, fences, and power poles were damaged. Several homes had their roofs damaged. HVAC equipment was damaged and light poles were downed at a hospital.							
EF0	ESE of Seiling	Dewey	OK	36.0946°N 98.7545°W	2333	0.3 mi (0.48 km)	30 yd (27 m)	$0
EF0	A storm chaser observed a brief tornado.							
EF0	N of Verden	Caddo	OK	35.1228°N 98.13°W	2341 – 2349	3.5 mi (5.6 km)	200 yd (180 m)	$0
EF0	Storm chasers observed a potentially significant tornado that occurred in a rural area.							
EF0	SSW of Wakita	Grant	OK	36.8131°N 97.9546°W	2356 – 2357	0.3 mi (0.48 km)	20 yd (18 m)	$0
EF0	A storm chaser observed a brief tornado.							
EF3	S of Munden	Republic	KS	39.8584°N 97.5478°W	0014 – 0017	1.87 mi (3.01 km)	100 yd (91 m)	Unknown
EF3	A home was leveled after a catastrophic failure of its garage door caused the structure to be lifted off its foundation and deposited 50–150 yd (46–137 m) northeast. Two cars in the garage were only slightly moved. Nearby trees were snapped and debarked.							
EF0	SW of Narka	Republic	KS	39.9513°N 97.4436°W	0028	0.01 mi (0.016 km)	50 yd (46 m)	$0
EF0	Tree limbs were downed.							
EF0	SW of Anthony	Harper	KS	37.09°N 98.12°W	0035 – 0036	0.25 mi (0.40 km)	50 yd (46 m)	$0
EF0	An off-duty NWS employee observed a brief tornado.							
EF1	N of Norway	Republic	KS	39.7119°N 97.7802°W	0038 – 0044	2.38 mi (3.83 km)	75 yd (69 m)	$0
EF1	Photos of grain bin damage confirmed a tornado.							
EF0	SE of Tuttle	Grady	OK	35.2534°N 97.7779°W	0049 – 0051	0.5 mi (0.80 km)	40 yd (37 m)	$0
EF0	Two homes sustained minor damage and trees were uprooted. Some damage was reported at the Tiger Safari Zoological park.							
EF0	ENE of Tuttle	Grady	OK	35.2977°N 97.741°W	0111 – 0121	3.5 mi (5.6 km)	200 yd (180 m)	$0
EF0	Damage was confined to trees.							
EF1	NE of Jamestown	Cloud	KS	39.5388°N 97.444°W	0133 – 0134	0.25 mi (0.40 km)	75 yd (69 m)	$0
EF1	Photos of damage to outbuildings confirmed a tornado.							
EF0	S of Minneapolis	Ottawa	KS	39.0601°N 97.7064°W	0138	0.02 mi (0.032 km)	50 yd (46 m)	$0
EF0	An emergency manager reported a brief tornado.							
EF3	Southeastern Oklahoma City	Oklahoma	OK	35.4061°N 97.4769°W	0141 – 0148	2 mi (3.2 km)	700 yd (640 m)	$0
EF3	A motel lost most of its second floor walls; many recreational vehicles at an adjacent RV park sustained significant damage.							
EF2	N of Archer City	Archer	TX	33.6434°N 98.7318°W	0149 – 0225	12 mi (19 km)	400 yd (370 m)	$0
EF2	Transmission lines were downed.							
EF0	NNW of Wells	Ottawa	KS	39.1756°N 97.5607°W	0155	0.25 mi (0.40 km)	50 yd (46 m)	$0
EF0	A storm chaser observed a brief tornado over open country.							
EF0	SW of Morrowville	Washington	KS	39.785°N 97.2698°W	0210 – 0219	6.04 mi (9.72 km)	50 yd (46 m)	$0
EF0	Minor tree damage was observed.							
EF0	NE of Aurora	Cloud	KS	39.3941°N 97.4673°W	0227 – 0241	8.8 mi (14.2 km)	75 yd (69 m)	$0
EF0	Tree limbs were damaged.							
EF0	W of Throckmorton	Throckmorton	TX	33.183°N 99.3198°W	0237 – 0248	3.39 mi (5.46 km)	440 yd (400 m)	$0
EF0	Storm chasers observed a large tornado moving across an open field.							
EF1	E of Clyde	Washington	KS	39.5963°N 97.3324°W	0256 – 0305	4.05 mi (6.52 km)	75 yd (69 m)	Unknown
EF1	Power poles were downed.							
EF0	WNW of Throckmorton	Throckmorton	TX	33.25°N 99.34°W	0300 – 0305	1.18 mi (1.90 km)	100 yd (91 m)	$0
EF0	Storm chasers reported a tornado over rural areas.							
EF0	NW of Washington	Washington	KS	39.8474°N 97.0883°W	0336 – 0337	0.25 mi (0.40 km)	75 yd (69 m)	$0
EF0	A trained storm spotter reported a brief tornado.							
EF1	NW of Cortland to WSW of Holland	Gage, Lancaster	NE	40.5058°N 96.7087°W	0349 – 0359	7.67 mi (12.34 km)	500 yd (460 m)	$0
EF1	Outbuildings, trees, and sheds sustained minor damage. The roofs of homes on farmsteads were damaged, and high-tension power lines were downed.							
EF0	NW of Elbert	Throckmorton	TX	33.3129°N 99.0496°W	0400 – 0401	0.01 mi (0.016 km)	50 yd (46 m)	$0
EF0	The public observed a tornado crossing a field.							

=== May 7 event ===
List of confirmed tornadoes – Thursday, May 7, 2015
EF#	Location	County / Parish	State	Start Coord.	Time (UTC)	Path length	Max width	Damage (2015 USD)
EF0	NW of Copeland	Haskell	KS	37.5998°N 100.6801°W	2045 – 2055	0.48 mi (0.77 km)	50 yd (46 m)	$0
EF0	The first of five landspout tornadoes was reported by an emergency manager.							
EF0	NNE of Copeland	Gray	KS	37.6081°N 100.588°W	2100 – 2105	0.25 mi (0.40 km)	50 yd (46 m)	$0
EF0	The second of five landspout tornadoes was reported by an emergency manager.							
EF0	WNW of Montezuma	Gray	KS	37.618°N 100.5596°W	2100 – 2106	0.19 mi (0.31 km)	50 yd (46 m)	$0
EF0	The third of five landspout tornadoes was reported by an emergency manager.							
EF0	NNE of Copeland	Gray	KS	37.6201°N 100.54°W	2101 – 2105	0.19 mi (0.31 km)	50 yd (46 m)	$0
EF0	The fourth of five landspout tornadoes was reported by an emergency manager.							
EF1	NE of Copeland	Gray	KS	37.6042°N 100.5349°W	2102 – 2108	0.24 mi (0.39 km)	50 yd (46 m)	$40,000
EF1	The final of five landspout tornadoes caused EF1 damage to well-built building, tractor, and home.							
EF1	SE of Walsh	Baca	CO	37.0839°N 102.1137°W	2259 – 2301	0.25 mi (0.40 km)	50 yd (46 m)	$3,000
EF1	A windmill was damaged.							
EF0	S of Fort Lupton	Weld	CO	40.04°N 104.81°W	0036	0.1 mi (0.16 km)	50 yd (46 m)	$0
EF0	A trained storm spotter reported a brief tornado in open country.							
EF1	N of Rhome	Wise	TX	33.1468°N 97.4658°W	2345 – 2353	3.37 mi (5.42 km)	200 yd (180 m)	$250,000
EF1	Two mobile homes were destroyed while twelve others were damaged. Several power poles and power lines were damaged.							
EF1	W of Krum to NW of Sanger	Denton	TX	33.255°N 97.3877°W	0045 – 0105	12.7 mi (20.4 km)	500 yd (460 m)	$210,000
EF1	Several barns sustained substantial damage, and several homes had their roofs damaged. A metal storage tank was lifted and thrown into a high tension power line, causing the steel beams to collapse. Open farm and ranch land was damaged.							
EF0	NNW of Runaway Bay	Wise	TX	33.2071°N 97.8899°W	0200 – 0202	0.29 mi (0.47 km)	50 yd (46 m)	$0
EF0	A few trees sustained minimal damage.							

=== May 8 event ===
List of confirmed tornadoes – Friday, May 8, 2015
EF#	Location	County / Parish	State	Start Coord.	Time (UTC)	Path length	Max width	Damage (2015 USD)
EF0	WNW of Vernon	Wilbarger	TX	34.2054°N 99.4516°W	2122	0.3 mi (0.48 km)	30 yd (27 m)	$0
EF0	A storm chaser and law enforcement officer reported a brief tornado.							
EF1	SW of Vernon	Wilbarger	TX	34.1209°N 99.4194°W	2128 – 2136	3.5 mi (5.6 km)	100 yd (91 m)	$0
EF1	Trees and the roof of a metal building were damaged.							
EF0	NNE of Haynesville	Wichita	TX	34.1301°N 98.8999°W	2221	0.3 mi (0.48 km)	50 yd (46 m)	$0
EF0	A metal outbuilding sustained minor damage.							
EF0	E of O'Brien	Haskell	TX	33.3809°N 99.7859°W	2230 – 2231	0.19 mi (0.31 km)	35 yd (32 m)	$0
EF0	A trained storm spotter reported a brief tornado.							
EF0	W of Randlett	Cotton	OK	34.18°N 98.495°W	2304	0.2 mi (0.32 km)	50 yd (46 m)	$0
EF0	Road signs were damaged.							
EF0	ESE of Randlett	Cotton	OK	34.1523°N 98.3792°W	2316	0.2 mi (0.32 km)	50 yd (46 m)	$0
EF0	A storm chaser reported a brief tornado.							
EF0	NW of Throckmorton	Throckmorton	TX	33.31°N 99.34°W	2322 – 2323	0.25 mi (0.40 km)	35 yd (32 m)	$0
EF0	The public reported a brief tornado.							
EF0	W of Waurika	Jefferson	OK	34.17°N 98.105°W	2340	0.5 mi (0.80 km)	50 yd (46 m)	$0
EF0	Broadcast media observed a brief tornado crossing U.S. Route 70.							
EF0	NW of Throckmorton	Throckmorton	TX	33.19°N 99.19°W	2340 – 2341	0.19 mi (0.31 km)	25 yd (23 m)	$0
EF0	A tornado was reported by the local sheriff's office.							
EF0	E of Waurika	Jefferson	OK	34.17°N 97.9825°W	0008	0.2 mi (0.32 km)	50 yd (46 m)	$0
EF0	A brief tornado was recorded on video.							
EF0	S of La Junta	Otero	CO	37.8953°N 103.575°W	0012 – 0014	0.82 mi (1.32 km)	50 yd (46 m)	$0
EF0	A storm chaser reported a brief tornado over open country.							

=== May 9 event ===
List of confirmed tornadoes – Saturday, May 9, 2015
EF#	Location	County / Parish	State	Start Coord.	Time (UTC)	Path length	Max width	Damage (2015 USD)
EF0	S of Karval	Lincoln	CO	38.53°N 103.50°W	2140	0.01 mi (0.016 km)	50 yd (46 m)	$0
EF0	A brief tornado with no damage							
EF0	W of Truckton	El Paso	CO	38.715°N 104.325°W	2141–2146	3.32 mi (5.34 km)	100 yd (91 m)	$0
EF0	Tornado remained over open fields							
EF0	SE of Eads	Kiowa	CO	38.43°N 102.69°W	2227–2235	1.07 mi (1.72 km)	50 yd (46 m)	$0
EF0	Tornado remained over open fields							
EF0	S of Matheson	Elbert	CO	39.04°N 103.95°W	2230	0.1 mi (0.16 km)	50 yd (46 m)	$0
EF0	A brief tornado with no damage							
EF3	SW of Cisco to W of Mangum	Eastland	TX	32.3032°N 99.0133°W	2132–2152	3.79 mi (6.10 km)	1,400 yd (1,300 m)	$400,000
EF3	1 death – A large stovepipe tornado destroyed several homes near Cisco, including one that was leveled. An unanchored hunting lodge was swept completely away, and numerous trees were denuded and partially debarked as well. A large concrete power pole was snapped, and vehicles and farm equipment were tossed more than 1 mi (1.6 km). An elderly woman was killed in the destruction of her mobile home, and one other person was critically injured..							
EF0	Near Lindsay	Cooke	TX	33.69°N 97.21°W	2155–2157	0.68 mi (1.09 km)	40 yd (37 m)	$0
EF0	A brief tornado with no damage							
EF0	SE of Eastland	Eastland	TX	32.34°N 98.7°W	2215	0.1 mi (0.16 km)	20 yd (18 m)	$90,000
EF0	A home, trees, and fences were damaged.							
EF0	Near Thackerville	Love	OK	33.79°N 97.1226°W	2230	0.3 mi (0.48 km)	30 yd (27 m)	$0
EF0	A brief tornado caused minor tree damage near Thackerville.							
EF0	ENE of Matheson	Elbert	CO	39.22°N 103.84°W	2240	0.1 mi (0.16 km)	50 yd (46 m)	$0
EF0	A brief tornado with no damage							
EF0	N of Chivington	Kiowa, Cheyenne	CO	38.5613°N 102.6073°W	2250–2306	11.06 mi (17.80 km)	150 yd (140 m)	$0
EF0	Tornado remained over open fields, causing some damage to fencing.							
EF0	Near Tucks Ferry	Love	OK	33.8684°N 97.0337°W	2250	0.3 mi (0.48 km)	30 yd (27 m)	$0
EF0	A brief tornado caused minor tree damage near Tucks Ferry.							
EF0	WNW of Burkburnett	Wichita	TX	34.11°N 98.63°W	2257–2304	3.25 mi (5.23 km)	50 yd (46 m)	$0
EF0	Tornado remained over open fields							
EF0	W of Randlett	Cotton	OK	34.18°N 98.53°W	2309–2311	1 mi (1.6 km)	100 yd (91 m)	$0
EF0	A stovepipe tornado was reported by a storm chaser.							
EF0	S of Firstview	Cheyenne	CO	38.7043°N 102.5177°W	2320–2323	2.07 mi (3.33 km)	10 yd (9.1 m)	$0
EF0	A trained storm spotter reported a brief, intermittent tornado.							
EF0	N of Willis	Marshall	OK	33.92°N 96.83°W	2324–2330	3 mi (4.8 km)	200 yd (180 m)	$0
EF0	A stovepipe tornado was reported by a storm chaser.							
EF0	E of Kit Carson	Cheyenne	CO	38.7834°N 102.512°W	2335–2338	1.04 mi (1.67 km)	25 yd (23 m)	$0
EF0	Intermittent tornado that caused no damage.							
EF0	NE of Huckabay	Erath	TX	32.35°N 98.35°W	2358–2359	0.29 mi (0.47 km)	80 yd (73 m)	$0
EF0	A tornado was reported by a trained spotter.							
EF1	SSW of Silo to ENE of Durant	Bryan	OK	34.0266°N 96.4867°W	0025–0035	5.25 mi (8.45 km)	200 yd (180 m)	—N/a
EF1	Two homes, including one mobile, were damaged and numerous trees were downed.							
EF0	N of Collyer	Trego	KS	39.0617°N 100.1198°W	0028–0040	3.95 mi (6.36 km)	100 yd (91 m)	$0
EF0	Tornado remained over open fields							
EF0	SSW of Saint Peter	Graham	KS	39.14°N 100.12°W	0055–0106	2.8 mi (4.5 km)	50 yd (46 m)	$0
EF0	A tornado was reported by local law enforcement.							
EF0	NE of Monument Rocks	Gove	KS	38.86°N 100.69°W	0100–0115	5.67 mi (9.12 km)	100 yd (91 m)	$0
EF0	Tornado remained over open fields							
EF0	N of Elk City	Beckham, Roger Mills	OK	40.24°N 99.54°W	0124–0126	2.01 mi (3.23 km)	100 yd (91 m)	$0
EF0	Some trees and a cattle feeder were damaged							
EF0	E of Stamford	Harlan	NE	40.13°N 99.5501°W	0125–0127	0.28 mi (0.45 km)	15 yd (14 m)	$0
EF0	A short-lived tornado was observed.							
EF0	E of Oxford	Harlan	NE	40.24°N 99.54°W	0136	0.01 mi (0.016 km)	15 yd (14 m)	$0
EF0	A storm spotter confirmed a brief touchdown.							
EF1	S of Grinnell	Gove	KS	38.86°N 100.69°W	0138–0158	6.07 mi (9.77 km)	50 yd (46 m)	$50,000
EF1	Tornado caused minor roof damage and overturned irrigation pivots							
EF0	ENE of Angelus to ESE of Rexford	Sheridan	KS	38.86°N 100.69°W	0212–0250	13.88 mi (22.34 km)	150 yd (140 m)	$0
EF0	Tornado remained over open fields							
EF2	NE of Menlo to ESE of Rexford	Sheridan, Decatur	KS	39.41°N 100.68°W	0250–0328	18.75 mi (30.18 km)	150 yd (140 m)	$75,000
EF2	A long-tracked tornado that remained over mostly open fields. Relatively minor damage took place near Selden and a barn elsewhere was destroyed.							
EF1	WSW of Oberlin to SSE of Traer	Decatur	KS	39.80°N 100.62°W	0343–0404	11.74 mi (18.89 km)	50 yd (46 m)	$6,000
EF1	Tornado remained over mostly rural area, but snapped multiple power poles along its path.							
EF0	SSW of McCook	Red Willow	NE	40.11°N 100.65°W	0420–0430	4.22 mi (6.79 km)	25 yd (23 m)	$0
EF0	Intermittent tornado that caused no damage							

=== May 10 event ===
List of confirmed tornadoes – Sunday, May 10, 2015
EF#	Location	County / Parish	State	Start Coord.	Time (UTC)	Path length	Max width	Damage (2015 USD)
EF1	SE of McAlester Regional Airport	Pittsburg	OK	34.8727°N 95.7721°W	1401–1404	3.8 mi (6.1 km)	200 yd (180 m)	$35,000
EF1	A tornado destroyed a barn, rolled a horse trailer, and toppled a grain silo.							
EF2	E of Wagner to N of Delmont	Charles Mix, Douglas	SD	43.092°N 98.232°W	1521–1553	16.16 mi (26.01 km)	400 yd (370 m)	$1,500,000
EF2	A high-end EF2 tornado struck Delmont directly. South of town, a house had its roof torn off and outbuildings were destroyed. Within Delmont, at least 20 structures were heavily damaged or destroyed, including a large church, the fire department, and several homes. A few small and frail cottage-type homes were leveled or swept away, and trees were snapped and stripped of foliage. Farm fields were scoured north of town before the tornado dissipated. Nine people were injured.							
EF0	WNW of Dimock	Hutchinson, Davison	SD	43.49°N 98.08°W	1615–1623	4.18 mi (6.73 km)	50 yd (46 m)	$0
EF0	Tornado remained over open fields and caused no damage							
EF1	N of Argyle to Denton	Denton	TX	33.132°N 97.183°W	1916–1926	5.19 mi (8.35 km)	150 yd (140 m)	$3,500,000
EF1	Numerous trees were snapped or uprooted. A home had damage to its roof, siding, awning, and gutters. One fast food restaurant had a significant portion of its roof removed while a second had its entire roofing structure ripped off. A small outbuilding was overturned. One mobile home had its underpinning removed while three others were slid off their foundations and two others had shingles removed.							
EF0	Krugerville	Denton	TX	33.2769°N 96.9836°W	1939–1941	2.9 mi (4.7 km)	75 yd (69 m)	$60,000
EF0	Tornado touched down in Krugerville, causing minor damage, before moving over mostly open fields. A farmstead sustained some damage.							
EF0	S of Inwood	Sioux	IA	43.24°N 96.45°W	2028–2030	0.85 mi (1.37 km)	50 yd (46 m)	$0
EF0	Tornado touched down over open field and caused no damage							
EF1	SW of Carpenter's Bluff	Grayson	TX	33.67°N 96.40°W	2108–2116	2.6 mi (4.2 km)	100 yd (91 m)	$50,000
EF1	Damage was mainly confined to trees, though one church near Carpenter's Bluff sustained roof damage.							
EF1	E of Shive	Hamilton	TX	31.5612°N 98.234°W	2145–2152	5.1 mi (8.2 km)	105 yd (96 m)	$100,000
EF1	Several groves of trees, outbuildings, and houses were damaged. One home had a majority of its roof removed and thrown into a field approximately 2 mi (3.2 km) downstream.							
EF0	Near Peoria	Hill	TX	31.9874°N 97.2682°W	2303–2305	0.6 mi (0.97 km)	50 yd (46 m)	$0
EF0	A brief tornado caused minor damage to farmland							
EF0	Near Cottonwood	Kaufman	TX	32.48°N 96.4°W	2307	0.1 mi (0.16 km)	20 yd (18 m)	$0
EF0	Brief tornado with no damage							
EF0	ESE of Jumbo	Pushmataha	OK	34.4223°N 95.711°W	2318–2321	1.7 mi (2.7 km)	100 yd (91 m)	$0
EF0	Several storm chasers witnessed a tornado; no known damage occurred.							
EF0	SW of Terrell	Kaufman	TX	32.65°N 96.33°W	2334	0.05 mi (0.080 km)	50 yd (46 m)	$0
EF0	Brief tornado touched down over open fields							
EF1	S of Lake City to N of Rockwell City	Carroll, Calhoun	IA	42.1467°N 94.8402°W	0010–0100	23.34 mi (37.56 km)	700 yd (640 m)	$1,025,000
EF1	South of Lake City, trees and power poles were snapped. The multi-vortex tornado then struck the city directly, tearing the roofs off of a manufactured home and the local high school. An apartment building lost a section of its roof, and trees in town were damaged. North of town, a grain bin and a camper were flipped over, and chicken houses were damaged. The tornado snapped power poles and damaged another grain bin near Rockwell City before dissipating.							
EF0	ESE of Canova	Miner	SD	43.86°N 97.39°W	0016–0017	0.35 mi (0.56 km)	50 yd (46 m)	$0
EF0	A brief tornado that caused no damage							
EF2	S of Wilburton to WSW of Red Oak	Latimer	OK	34.7649°N 95.3112°W	0018–0041	15 mi (24 km)	880 yd (800 m)	$100,000
EF2	A tornado moved through heavily forested areas, flattening a large swath of trees. Outbuildings were damaged, a house was moved off of its foundation, and another house lost much of its roof. An oil drilling platform was damaged, and a large plastic oil tank was tossed. Two metal storage buildings were damaged as well.							
EF0	NE of Brandon	Hill	TX	32.0526°N 96.9653°W	0020–0030	1.42 mi (2.29 km)	150 yd (140 m)	$50,000
EF0	Tornado remained over fields and caused crop damage.							
EF0	NW of Red Oak	Latimer	OK	34.9692°N 95.0984°W	0046–0052	3.7 mi (6.0 km)	75 yd (69 m)	$0
EF0	Large tree limbs were snapped.							
EF0	WSW of Manson	Calhoun	IA	42.5192°N 94.5794°W	0114–0116	1.03 mi (1.66 km)	400 yd (370 m)	$0
EF0	A brief tornado caused minor damage							
EF3	N of Edom to N of Van	Van Zandt	TX	32.41°N 95.62°W	0146–0209	10.22 mi (16.45 km)	700 yd (640 m)	$40,000,000
EF3	2 deaths – A significant tornado began south of Van and moved north directly though town. Numerous homes and mobile homes were damaged or destroyed, and many trees and power lines were downed throughout Van. A school building in town sustained major roof damage, and a nearby metal-frame industrial building was destroyed. A few well-built frame homes in the northern part of town were left with only interior walls standing. An oil pump derrick toppled to the ground, along with a large metal high-tension truss tower. Several barns and outbuildings were destroyed as well. At least 47 people were injured.							
EF1	NNW of Garden Valley	Smith	TX	32.6348°N 95.5807°W	0219–0220	1.44 mi (2.32 km)	440 yd (400 m)	$125,000
EF1	Several homes sustained roof damage, outbuildings were damaged or destroyed, and numerous trees were snapped and uprooted.							
EF1	NNW of Garden Valley	Smith	TX	32.6129°N 95.5761°W	0350–0351	1.09 mi (1.75 km)	450 yd (410 m)	$125,000
EF1	Several outbuildings were damaged or destroyed, and numerous trees were snapped and uprooted.							
EF2	Western Nashville	Howard	AR	33.9311°N 93.8659°W	0418–0434	6.7 mi (10.8 km)	400 yd (370 m)	$1,500,000
EF2	2 deaths – A strong tornado impacted a mobile home park in the western part of town, completely destroying five mobile homes, killing two occupants, and resulting in eight injuries. Numerous trees were snapped or uprooted, and power lines were downed as well. Approximately 40 to 60 homes sustained minor to moderate damage, mainly from fallen trees.							
EF0	NNW of Stalls	Marion	TX	32.8357°N 94.3114°W	0425–0427	0.28 mi (0.45 km)	172 yd (157 m)	$0
EF0	Numerous softwood trees were uprooted and numerous large tree limbs were downed.							
EF0	SW of Lodi	Marion, Cass	TX	32.8643°N 94.2865°W	0428–0432	2.64 mi (4.25 km)	345 yd (315 m)	$0
EF0	Numerous softwood and hardwood trees were uprooted.							

=== May 11 event ===
List of confirmed tornadoes – Monday, May 11, 2015
EF#	Location	County / Parish	State	Start Coord.	Time (UTC)	Path length	Max width	Damage (2015 USD)
EF1	E New Summerfield	Cherokee	TX	31.9604°N 95.0562°W	0634–0636	1.39 mi (2.24 km)	76 yd (69 m)	—N/a
EF1	Several trees were snapped and uprooted.							
EF0	NW of Iota	Acadia	LA	30.38°N 92.56°W	1535	0.01 mi (0.016 km)	10 yd (9.1 m)	$0
EF0	A brief tornado touched down over an open field.							
EF0	Manteo	Dare	NC	35.8918°N 75.6749°W	2110–2111	0.51 mi (0.82 km)	30 yd (27 m)	$5,000
EF0	A waterspout moved ashore, downing tree limbs. This tornado was spawned by Tropical Storm Ana							

=== May 13 event ===
List of confirmed tornadoes – Wednesday, May 13, 2015
EF#	Location	County / Parish	State	Start Coord.	Time (UTC)	Path length	Max width	Damage (2015 USD)
EF0	SE of Victoria Regional Airport	Victoria	TX	28.8024°N 96.8436°W	2101	0.01 mi (0.016 km)	10 yd (9.1 m)	$0
EF0	A brief tornado touched down over an open field.							
EF0	WNW of Guthrie	King	TX	33.6231°N 100.3362°W	2257–2258	0.08 mi (0.13 km)	25 yd (23 m)	$0
EF0	A brief tornado touched down over an open field just west of Guthrie.							
EF0	SW of Freer	Webb	TX	27.78°N 98.99°W	2326–2328	0.62 mi (1.00 km)	50 yd (46 m)	$0
EF0	A brief tornado touched down over an open field							

=== May 14 event ===
List of confirmed tornadoes – Thursday, May 14, 2015
EF#	Location	County / Parish	State	Start Coord.	Time (UTC)	Path length	Max width	Damage (2015 USD)
EF0	SE of Mendon	Chariton	MO	39.5878°N 93.1345°W	0120–0121	0.28 mi (0.45 km)	25 yd (23 m)	—N/a
EF0	A brief tornado caused minor structural damage and downed power lines.							

=== May 15 event ===
List of confirmed tornadoes – Friday, May 15, 2015
EF#	Location	County / Parish	State	Start Coord.	Time (UTC)	Path length	Max width	Damage (2015 USD)
EF1	NW of Cotulla	La Salle	TX	28.54°N 99.38°W	1129–1135	2.26 mi (3.64 km)	50 yd (46 m)	$100,000
EF1	Numerous large trees were snapped at their bases or uprooted. A wooden cabin was destroyed, with its debris lofted approximately 100 yd (91 m) downstream.							
EF0	N of Cotulla	La Salle	TX	28.47°N 99.24°W	1144–1148	0.78 mi (1.26 km)	30 yd (27 m)	$50,000
EF0	A brief tornado impacted a ranch, damaging three barns and several trees.							
EF0	N of Rosita	Duval	TX	27.85°N 98.42°W	1618–1619	0.02 mi (0.032 km)	20 yd (18 m)	$0
EF0	A brief tornado touched down over an open field							
EF0	W of Flour Bluff	Nueces	TX	27.65013°N 97.3728°W	1805–1806	0.22 mi (0.35 km)	25 yd (23 m)	$25,000
EF0	A large tree was blown onto a car, an outbuilding was heavily damaged, and a business had some of its flashing peeled back below the roof line.							
EF0	ENE of Portland	San Patricio	TX	29.70°N 97.28°W	1820–1825	1.38 mi (2.22 km)	50 yd (46 m)	$100,000
EF0	Tornado struck a Voestalpine plant. A trailer was flipped, injuring its three occupants.							
EF0	NNW of Leader	Adams	CO	40.0°N 104.14°W	2003	0.1 mi (0.16 km)	50 yd (46 m)	$0
EF0	A brief tornado touched down over an open field							
EF1	N of Strasburg	Adams	CO	39.9°N 104.3°W	2051–2055	0.1 mi (0.16 km)	100 yd (91 m)	$15,000
EF1	A brief tornado damaged a storage shed							
EF1	WSW of Huntley to E of Torrington	Goshen	WY	41.919°N 104.211°W	2134–2200	9.84 mi (15.84 km)	400 yd (370 m)	—N/a
EF1	A few trees were uprooted, and several wooden power poles were leant. One irrigation pivot was blown over while another was destroyed. A car garage was destroyed, and a single-wide mobile home was rolled onto its side. Several outbuildings were impacted: two had metal roofing panels removed, two had their doors collapsed, one was overturned, and one had its walls collapsed. Several livestock were killed.							
EF0	ESE of Netawaka	Jackson	KS	39.59°N 95.68°W	2322–2323	0.05 mi (0.080 km)	20 yd (18 m)	$0
EF0	A brief tornado touched down over an open field							
EF0	W of Robinson	Brown	KS	39.82°N 95.45°W	0041	0.05 mi (0.080 km)	20 yd (18 m)	$0
EF0	A brief tornado touched down over an open field							
EF0	SSW of Irwin	Cherry	NE	42.81°N 101.97°W	0134–0136	0.08 mi (0.13 km)	20 yd (18 m)	$0
EF0	A brief tornado touched down in open rangeland; no damage was reported.							
EF0	SSW of Rushville	Sheridan	NE	42.698°N 102.464°W	0208–0210	0.01 mi (0.016 km)	10 yd (9.1 m)	$0
EF0	A brief tornado was reported; no known damage occurred.							

=== May 16 event ===
List of confirmed tornadoes – Saturday, May 16, 2015
EF#	Location	County / Parish	State	Start Coord.	Time (UTC)	Path length	Max width	Damage (2015 USD)
EF0	NNE of Silverton	Briscoe	TX	34.6°N 101.24°W	1812–1813	0.54 mi (0.87 km)	30 yd (27 m)	$0
EF0	An off-duty fire department volunteer observed a brief tornado.							
EF0	E of Cody	Park	WY	44.5021°N 108.7494°W	1913–1922	1.37 mi (2.20 km)	20 yd (18 m)	$0
EF0	A law enforcement officer reported a tornado over open country.							
EF1	W of Hedley	Donley	TX	34.873°N 100.7414°W	1920–1938	8.59 mi (13.82 km)	150 yd (140 m)	$0
EF1	A residence sustained significant roof damage, and several large trees were snapped at their bases.							
EF1	NNE of Hedley to WSW of Shamrock	Donley, Collingsworth	TX	34.9486°N 100.6218°W	1940–2007	22.48 mi (36.18 km)	100 yd (91 m)	$0
EF1	A long-lived tornado snapped power poles and trees at its peak.							
EF0	W of Shamrock	Wheeler	TX	35.2226°N 100.2882°W	2014–2025	5.49 mi (8.84 km)	30 yd (27 m)	$0
EF0	A tornado caused EF0 damage along its path.							
EF1	N of Montevideo	Chippewa	MN	45.0499°N 95.7361°W	2133–2138	1.83 mi (2.95 km)	50 yd (46 m)	$250,000
EF1	A large machine shed was pushed off its foundation and destroyed, with metal blown 1.5 mi (2.4 km) downwind; much of the inside equipment was also destroyed. A metal fence was downed, dozens of trees were snapped, and new soybean crops were clipped off.							
EF1	NE of Strong City	Roger Mills	OK	35.852°N 99.448°W	2149–2155	3.5 mi (5.6 km)	100 yd (91 m)	$0
EF1	A travel trailer and equipment barn were destroyed. Two mobile homes, a few outbuildings, and the roof of a house were damaged.							
EF1	NNE of Leedey	Dewey	OK	35.93°N 99.309°W	2205	0.5 mi (0.80 km)	50 yd (46 m)	$0
EF1	A mobile home, barn, and well house were damaged.							
EF0	NE of Danvers	Swift	MN	45.3007°N 95.7229°W	2218–2226	2.69 mi (4.33 km)	100 yd (91 m)	$5,000
EF0	A number of trees were broken or downed, and a farmstead sustained minor damage.							
EF0	SW of Murdock	Chippewa	MN	45.1012°N 95.5275°W	2223–2229	2.7 mi (4.3 km)	25 yd (23 m)	$0
EF0	Numerous storm chasers observed a tornado over open fields.							
EF3	N of Chillicothe to E of Snyder	Hardeman (TX), Wilbarger (TX), Jackson (OK), Tillman (OK), Kiowa (OK)	TX, OK	34.3801°N 99.5061°W	2226–2345	42.13 mi (67.80 km)	1,600 yd (1,500 m)	$0
EF3	Multiple-vortex wedge tornado. Metal buildings, outbuildings, and trees sustained major damage or were destroyed. Power poles were broken and a few homes were damaged as well. Video and radar evidence suggest that this was likely a violent (EF4 or stronger) tornado over a sparsely populated area.							
EF1	SSW of De Graff	Swift	MN	45.1615°N 95.5148°W	2233–2240	3.07 mi (4.94 km)	100 yd (91 m)	$50,000
EF1	An outbuilding was destroyed and windows were blown out of a house. Power lines were downed.							
EF0	NW of Benson	Swift	MN	45.3736°N 95.7558°W	2236–2237	0.15 mi (0.24 km)	15 yd (14 m)	$0
EF0	Storm chasers observed a brief tornado in an open field.							
EF1	N of Neosho Rapids	Lyon	KS	38.403°N 95.986°W	2237–2239	0.18 mi (0.29 km)	50 yd (46 m)	$0
EF1	A farm outbuilding had its roof uplifted, while a nearby shed had metal roofing panels ripped off.							
EF0	Elk City	Beckham	OK	35.424°N 99.372°W	2247	0.2 mi (0.32 km)	30 yd (27 m)	$0
EF0	At least one RV was overturned in an RV park.							
EF0	SW of Murdock	Chippewa	MN	45.1035°N 95.5103°W	2251–2253	0.81 mi (1.30 km)	25 yd (23 m)	$0
EF0	Numerous storm chasers observed a tornado over open fields.							
EF0	SSW of Murdock	Chippewa	MN	45.1438°N 95.4475°W	2257–2300	0.51 mi (0.82 km)	25 yd (23 m)	$0
EF0	Multiple storm chasers observed a tornado over open fields.							
EF0	W of Tipton	Tillman	OK	34.5111°N 99.1725°W	2305	0.2 mi (0.32 km)	20 yd (18 m)	$0
EF0	A storm chaser observed a brief tornado.							
EF1	NW of Fairview to ESE of Aline	Major, Alfalfa	OK	36.3175°N 98.5609°W	2322–2345	16 mi (26 km)	400 yd (370 m)	$0
EF1	A house was moved off its foundation. A mobile home, outbuildings, trees, and utility poles were damaged. An outbuilding was destroyed, and a truck was overturned.							
EF0	NE of Murdock	Swift	MN	45.27°N 95.3594°W	2324–2325	0.25 mi (0.40 km)	25 yd (23 m)	$0
EF0	Multiple storm chasers observed a brief tornado in an open field.							
EF0	WSW of Sunburg	Swift	MN	45.3315°N 95.3315°W	2338–2342	1.26 mi (2.03 km)	25 yd (23 m)	$0
EF0	Numerous storm chasers observed a tornado in an open field.							
EF0	S of Terrace	Pope	MN	45.4302°N 95.293°W	0001–0002	0.11 mi (0.18 km)	15 yd (14 m)	$0
EF0	Multiple storm chasers observed a brief tornado in an open field.							
EF1	SW of Meers	Comanche	OK	34.7186°N 98.6547°W	0014–0024	7.14 mi (11.49 km)	400 yd (370 m)	$0
EF1	A trained storm spotter reported a large tornado in the Wichita Mountains Wildlife Refuge.							
EF0	Western Sedan	Pope	MN	45.5125°N 95.264°W	0015–0029	5.02 mi (8.08 km)	200 yd (180 m)	$0
EF0	Approximately a dozen trees were uprooted.							
EF0	NE of Seymour	Archer	TX	33.82°N 98.9339°W	0022	0.2 mi (0.32 km)	30 yd (27 m)	$0
EF0	The public relayed video of a waterspout over Lake Diversion.							
EF0	N of Sedan	Pope	MN	45.6117°N 95.2623°W	0041–0047	2.52 mi (4.06 km)	50 yd (46 m)	$0
EF0	Numerous storm chasers observed a tornado in an open field.							
EF0	W of Darwin	Meeker	MN	45.0656°N 94.4557°W	0048–0058	5.02 mi (8.08 km)	50 yd (46 m)	$50,000
EF0	A barn and other sheds were pushed off their foundations, the roof was ripped off a pole barn, and dozens of trees were downed.							
EF0	NW of Cyril	Caddo	OK	34.9409°N 98.2499°W	0055–0058	2.01 mi (3.23 km)	50 yd (46 m)	$0
EF0	Tree damage was observed along the path.							
EF0	SE of Villard	Pope	MN	45.7112°N 95.2322°W	0056–0059	0.77 mi (1.24 km)	15 yd (14 m)	$0
EF0	Multiple storm chasers observed a tornado.							
EF0	S of Geronimo	Comanche	OK	34.4493°N 98.4172°W	0058–0108	6 mi (9.7 km)	50 yd (46 m)	$0
EF0	Multiple storm chasers observed a tornado.							
EF0	NNW of Cyril	Caddo	OK	34.9669°N 98.2338°W	0101–0105	2.5 mi (4.0 km)	50 yd (46 m)	$0
EF0	Storm chasers reported a tornado.							
EF0	SSW of Osakis	Douglas	MN	45.7648°N 95.2127°W	0109–0111	0.21 mi (0.34 km)	15 yd (14 m)	$0
EF0	Multiple storm chasers observed a tornado in an open field.							
EF0	Kimball	Stearns	MN	45.2947°N 94.3077°W	0128–0132	1.44 mi (2.32 km)	25 yd (23 m)	$100,000
EF0	A couple dozen trees were downed. A barn was pushed over and multiple sheds were damaged, including a storage shed that had its equipment strewn downstream.							
EF0	Lawson	Ray	MO	39.43°N 94.21°W	0235–0237	0.87 mi (1.40 km)	100 yd (91 m)	Unknown
EF0	Trees and residences sustained minor damage.							
EF1	NE of Okemah	Okfuskee	OK	35.4772°N 96.2666°W	0320–0321	1.4 mi (2.3 km)	110 yd (100 m)	$0
EF1	Trees were snapped and uprooted.							
EF2	SW of Sibley to NW of Orrick	Jackson, Ray	MO	39.14°N 94.22°W	0415–0432	10.03 mi (16.14 km)	250 yd (230 m)	Unknown
EF2	Several hardwood trees were snapped or uprooted, and a few poles were leant or snapped. One residence sustained minor damage to its roof and had its shed destroyed. Roof and wall panels were ripped from a metal building system. A second residence sustained major damage, with its roof largely removed, chimney and carport collapsed, and garage doors blown inward. A barn on the property had a portion of its roofing removed. An outbuilding had metal roofing panels ripped off. A single-wide mobile home was completely destroyed and wrapped around a tree.							
EF2	SW of Oneta to W of Inola	Wagoner, Rogers	OK	35.9727°N 95.7615°W	0426–0441	16 mi (26 km)	1,000 yd (910 m)	$2,000,000
EF2	Up to 120 homes were damaged, some severely. Barns and outbuildings were destroyed, many trees were snapped or uprooted, and power poles were snapped.							
EF2	WNW of Inola to ENE of Tiawah	Rogers	OK	36.1719°N 95.57°W	0443–0451	9.8 mi (15.8 km)	1,500 yd (1,400 m)	$1,000,000
EF2	Dozens of homes were damaged, some severely. Barns outbuildings were destroyed, numerous trees were snapped or uprooted, and power poles were snapped.							
EF1	Polo area	Ray, Caldwell	MO	39.51°N 94.03°W	0451–0457	2.82 mi (4.54 km)	100 yd (91 m)	Unknown
EF1	A few hardwood trees were snapped. One outbuilding had its metal roofing panels ripped off, while a second one had its walls collapsed. A barn, a house, and a few mobile homes sustained minor damage.							
EF1	NE of Tiawah	Rogers	OK	36.2942°N 95.4774°W	0452–0456	3.3 mi (5.3 km)	300 yd (270 m)	$30,000
EF1	Several trees were uprooted, several large tree branches and power poles were snapped, and several homes were damaged.							

=== May 17 event ===
List of confirmed tornadoes – Sunday, May 17, 2015
EF#	Location	County / Parish	State	Start Coord.	Time (UTC)	Path length	Max width	Damage (2015 USD)
EF1	NW of Pryor	Mayes	OK	36.3613°N 95.4017°W	0500 – 0503	2.3 mi (3.7 km)	450 yd (410 m)	$10,000
EF1	Numerous trees were snapped or uprooted and power poles were downed.							
EF1	W of Adrian	Bates	MO	38.39°N 94.39°W	0505 – 0509	0.88 mi (1.42 km)	100 yd (91 m)	Unknown
EF1	Several trees were uprooted. An outbuilding had its walls collapsed. One residence had its doors and windows shattered, while a second residence had its roof ripped off, chimney and carport collapsed, and garage doors blown inward. A second outbuilding had metal roofing panels removed.							
EF1	N of Adair	Mayes	OK	36.4715°N 95.2809°W	0510 – 0516	4.5 mi (7.2 km)	600 yd (550 m)	$75,000
EF1	At least two outbuildings were destroyed, two homes were damaged, and trees were snapped or uprooted. Power poles were downed.							
EF1	N of Cleora	Craig, Delaware	OK	36.5575°N 95.0126°W	0524 – 0529	4.6 mi (7.4 km)	550 yd (500 m)	$100,000
EF1	A mobile home and several outbuildings and barns were destroyed. Numerous trees were snapped or uprooted and power poles were downed.							
EF1	Bernice area	Delaware, Ottawa	OK	36.6208°N 94.9561°W	0530 – 0538	6.7 mi (10.8 km)	1,100 yd (1,000 m)	$20,000
EF1	Two mobile homes were damaged, power poles were downed, and numerous trees were snapped or uprooted.							
EF1	SSE of Fairland to ESE of Wyandotte	Ottawa	OK	36.6812°N 94.8289°W	0538 – 0550	11.5 mi (18.5 km)	650 yd (590 m)	$125,000
EF1	A mobile home and several outbuildings were destroyed, a home and chicken houses were damaged, and numerous trees were snapped or uprooted.							
EF0	Clinton	Henry	MO	38.3539°N 93.7857°W	0548 – 0557	6.46 mi (10.40 km)	25 yd (23 m)	Unknown
EF0	Some residences and trees sustained minor damage.							
EF1	ESE of Wyandotte to W of Neosho	Ottawa, Newton	OK, MO	36.7638°N 94.6368°W	0551–0601	12.23 mi (19.68 km)	200 yd (180 m)	$200,000
EF1	Numerous trees were uprooted, and several outbuildings were completely destroyed.							
EF1	NE of Monett	Lawrence	MO	36.9559°N 93.8971°W	0638–0642	4.53 mi (7.29 km)	100 yd (91 m)	$100,000
EF1	Numerous trees were snapped or uprooted. A house sustained minor damage to its siding and roof, and several outbuildings were destroyed.							
EF0	E of Dunnegan	Polk	MO	37.6983°N 93.5058°W	0707–0709	1.7 mi (2.7 km)	200 yd (180 m)	$0
EF0	Multiple trees were damaged.							
EF0	W of Polk	Polk	MO	37.6971°N 93.4336°W	0710–0722	10.57 mi (17.01 km)	100 yd (91 m)	$15,000
EF0	Numerous trees were damaged or uprooted, and two homes sustained damage to their roofing and siding.							
EF0	E of Humansville	Polk	MO	37.7795°N 93.4794°W	0711–0714	2.09 mi (3.36 km)	100 yd (91 m)	$20,000
EF0	Numerous trees were damaged or uprooted, and a couple of outbuildings were destroyed.							
EF0	SSW of Truro	Madison	IA	41.1702°N 93.8964°W	0720 – 0731	7.11 mi (11.44 km)	130 yd (120 m)	$30,000
EF0	Outbuildings, storage silos, and trees were damaged.							
EF0	WNW of East Peru	Madison	IA	41.2513°N 93.982°W	0727 – 0731	1.7 mi (2.7 km)	50 yd (46 m)	$1,000
EF0	A few trees were damaged.							
EF0	NE of Buffalo	Dallas	MO	37.7952°N 93.0516°W	0738–0739	0.1 mi (0.16 km)	40 yd (37 m)	$5,000
EF0	A brief tornado struck a farm, causing minor damage to buildings.							
EF1	N of Patterson	Madison	IA	41.4158°N 93.8957°W	0740 – 0742	1.49 mi (2.40 km)	100 yd (91 m)	$2,000
EF1	Several groves of trees were damaged.							
EF1	NNW of Patterson	Madison	IA	41.3937°N 93.9169°W	0740 – 0742	1.54 mi (2.48 km)	110 yd (100 m)	$55,000
EF1	A horse trailer was thrown 40 yd (37 m) into a pine tree, flipping a parked car in the process. Outbuilding roofs and trees were damaged.							
EF0	NNW of Van Meter	Dallas	IA	41.5721°N 93.988°W	0800 – 0801	0.32 mi (0.51 km)	40 yd (37 m)	$0
EF0	Trees were damaged.							
EF1	W of Tickfaw	Tangipahoa	LA	30.5479°N 90.5421°W	0830 – 0838	1.56 mi (2.51 km)	50 yd (46 m)	$100,000
EF1	Several hardwood trees were uprooted, one of which impacted a pickup truck. Two houses had sections of their metal roofing removed and outbuildings in both of the houses' yards were damaged, with debris tossed into nearby trees. Several mobile homes were impacted: one was rolled onto its roof, another was slid off its blocks with half the structure completely destroyed, and one sustained a huge hole in its exterior wall. Two sheds were destroyed.							
EF0	N of Gresham	Shawano	WI	44.8705°N 88.85°W	2031 – 2040	4.84 mi (7.79 km)	75 yd (69 m)	$0
EF0	At least a dozen trees were damaged and a barn lost several shingles.							

=== May 18 event ===
List of confirmed tornadoes – Monday, May 18, 2015
EF#	Location	County / Parish	State	Start Coord.	Time (UTC)	Path length	Max width	Damage (2015 USD)
EF0	E of Toyah	Reeves	TX	31.33°N 103.3522°W	2225–2227	1.39 mi (2.24 km)	100 yd (91 m)	$0
EF0	A brief tornado that caused no damage							
EF0	SE of Toyah	Reeves	TX	31.2924°N 103.3772°W	2253–2258	3.57 mi (5.75 km)	150 yd (140 m)	$0
EF0	Tornado remained over open fields.							

=== May 19 event ===
List of confirmed tornadoes – Tuesday, May 19, 2015
EF#	Location	County / Parish	State	Start Coord.	Time (UTC)	Path length	Max width	Damage (2015 USD)
EF0	SE of Giddings	Lee	TX	30.1553°N 96.8811°W	1725–1728	2.14 mi (3.44 km)	100 yd (91 m)	$10,000
EF0	Trees were uprooted. An outbuilding was destroyed, with pieces of debris shattering glass and causing minor roof damage to a local hotel. One person was injured.							
EF0	S of Washington	McClain	OK	34.96°N 97.48°W	1940	0.1 mi (0.16 km)	20 yd (18 m)	$0
EF0	A brief tornado that caused no damage.							
EF0	SW of Purcell	McClain	OK	34.96°N 97.43°W	1951	0.1 mi (0.16 km)	20 yd (18 m)	$0
EF0	A brief tornado that caused no damage.							
EF0	SW of McCamey	Upton	TX	31.1118°N 102.2389°W	2018–2019	0.08 mi (0.13 km)	50 yd (46 m)	$0
EF0	A brief tornado that caused no damage.							
EF0	SE of Waxahachie	Ellis	TX	32.3102°N 96.7952°W	2021 – 2029	4.65 mi (7.48 km)	80 yd (73 m)	$120,000
EF0	Up to twenty homes suffered at leastminor damage, but only one home had more than shingle damage. Fences and storage buildings were damaged as well.							
EF0	ENE of Lexington	Cleveland	OK	35.0322°N 97.2747°W	2022	0.1 mi (0.16 km)	10 yd (9.1 m)	$0
EF0	A meteorologist observed a brief tornado that caused no known damage.							
EF0	SE of Girvin	Pecos	TX	31.0084°N 102.2964°W	2025–2029	0.8 mi (1.3 km)	150 yd (140 m)	$0
EF0	A brief tornado that caused no damage							
EF0	SSW of McCamey	Upton	TX	31.1183°N 102.2376°W	2025–2028	0.19 mi (0.31 km)	100 yd (91 m)	$0
EF0	A brief tornado that caused no damage							
EF0	NE of Harrold	Wichita	TX	34.12°N 98.92°W	2033	0.2 mi (0.32 km)	30 yd (27 m)	$0
EF0	A brief tornado that caused no damage							
EF0	WSW of Grandfield	Tillman	OK	34.21°N 98.75°W	2054–2104	1 mi (1.6 km)	400 yd (370 m)	$0
EF0	A large, multiple vortex tornado that remained over open fields and caused no damage.							
EF0	SW of Bakersfield	Pecos	TX	30.8288°N 102.3396°W	2112–2117	2.91 mi (4.68 km)	150 yd (140 m)	$0
EF0	Tornado remained over open fields and caused no damage							
EF0	W of Brooksville	Pottawatomie	OK	35.20°N 96.99°W	2119	0.1 mi (0.16 km)	20 yd (18 m)	$0
EF0	A brief tornado that caused no damage							
EF0	SW of Bakersfield	Pecos	TX	30.7777°N 102.3992°W	2127–2129	1.63 mi (2.62 km)	100 yd (91 m)	$0
EF0	Tornado remained over open fields and caused no damage							
EF0	SSE of Bakersfield	Pecos	TX	30.6303°N 102.2053°W	2207–2209	0.76 mi (1.22 km)	100 yd (91 m)	$0
EF0	Tornado remained over open fields and caused no damage							
EF0	SW of Bakersfield	Pecos	TX	30.6718°N 102.5354°W	2208 – 2209	0.49 mi (0.79 km)	50 yd (46 m)	$0
EF0	A brief tornado that caused no damage							
EF0	NW of Loving	Young	TX	33.3322°N 98.5667°W	2233 – 2235	0.32 mi (0.51 km)	70 yd (64 m)	$0
EF0	A brief tornado caused no damage.							
EF0	NW of Loving	Young	TX	33.3472°N 98.5529°W	2235 – 2237	0.2 mi (0.32 km)	65 yd (59 m)	$0
EF0	A brief tornado caused no damage.							
EF0	S of Windthorst	Archer	TX	33.4208°N 98.44°W	2255	0.2 mi (0.32 km)	30 yd (27 m)	$0
EF0	A brief tornado caused no damage.							
EF0	NNW of Terral	Jefferson	OK	33.95°N 97.97°W	2316 – 2319	1 mi (1.6 km)	400 yd (370 m)	$0
EF0	Tornado remained over open fields and caused no damage.							
EF0	NE of Palo Pinto	Palo Pinto	TX	32.78°N 98.27°W	2319 – 2321	0.49 mi (0.79 km)	75 yd (69 m)	$0
EF0	Isolated tree damage was observed.							
EF0	NNE of Antelope	Jack	TX	33.4513°N 98.3532°W	2320 – 2322	0.74 mi (1.19 km)	80 yd (73 m)	$0
EF0	A brief tornado caused minimal damage over open range land.							
EF0	NW of Iowa Park	Wichita	TX	34.0114°N 98.7441°W	2320 – 2322	1 mi (1.6 km)	50 yd (46 m)	$0
EF0	A brief tornado caused no damage.							
EF0	S of Ryan, OK	Clay	TX	33.9593°N 97.9672°W	2321 – 2325	1 mi (1.6 km)	200 yd (180 m)	$0
EF0	Multiple-vortex tornado remained over open fields and caused no damage.							
EF0	SSE of Ryan	Jefferson	OK	33.9665°N 97.9233°W	2323 – 2331	1 mi (1.6 km)	250 yd (230 m)	$0
EF0	Tornado remained over open fields and caused no damage.							
EF0	W of Oscar	Jefferson	OK	33.9757°N 97.821°W	2340 – 2344	2 mi (3.2 km)	200 yd (180 m)	$0
EF0	Tornado remained over open fields and caused no damage.							
EF0	S of Joy	Clay	TX	33.5221°N 98.22°W	2345	0.2 mi (0.32 km)	30 yd (27 m)	$0
EF0	A brief tornado caused no damage.							
EF0	NE of Caddo to W of Palo Pinto	Palo Pinto	TX	32.7987°N 98.5351°W	0023 – 0024	2.55 mi (4.10 km)	75 yd (69 m)	$0
EF0	Minor tree damage occurred over open land.							
EF1	Mineral Wells	Palo Pinto	TX	32.8055°N 98.1181°W	0029 – 0032	0.75 mi (1.21 km)	200 yd (180 m)	$230,000
EF1	A church and several businesses sustained damage consistent with an EF1 tornado, whereas surrounding structures witnessed EF0 damage. Numerous trees and power poles were snapped.							
EF0	SW of Wilson	Carter	OK	34.0781°N 97.5289°W	0155	0.3 mi (0.48 km)	30 yd (27 m)	$0
EF0	A brief tornado caused no damage.							
EF0	N of Joplin to WNW of Balsora	Jack, Wise	TX	33.1654°N 97.9851°W	0218 – 0228	4.21 mi (6.78 km)	80 yd (73 m)	$150,000
EF0	Damage to trees, homes, and farm equipment was observed.							
EF0	SSE of Wilson	Carter	OK	34.0931°N 97.3966°W	0235 – 0243	1.5 mi (2.4 km)	50 yd (46 m)	$0
EF0	A brief tornado caused no damage.							
EF0	S of Runaway Bay	Wise	TX	33.1593°N 97.9127°W	0239 – 0245	1.96 mi (3.15 km)	80 yd (73 m)	$80,000
EF0	Damage was largely confined to trees and farm buildings.							
EF1	Runaway Bay	Wise	TX	33.1824°N 97.8613°W	0241 – 0243	1.8 mi (2.9 km)	100 yd (91 m)	$450,000
EF1	A condominium and several homes were severely damaged. One home had its second story balcony removed.							
EF1	N of Balsora to ENE of Balsora	Wise	TX	33.135°N 97.8481°W	0254 – 0259	2.47 mi (3.98 km)	110 yd (100 m)	$300,000
EF1	Several homes, pieces of farm equipment, and mobile homes sustained EF1 damage. Extensive tree damage was observed.							
EF1	E of Decatur	Wise	TX	33.2148°N 97.488°W	0336 – 0338	1.92 mi (3.09 km)	90 yd (82 m)	$120,000
EF1	A few homes sustained EF1 damage, with less severe damage to additional residences and barns.							
EF0	Jacksboro	Jack	TX	33.2169°N 98.1713°W	0404 – 0405	0.16 mi (0.26 km)	30 yd (27 m)	$80,000
EF0	A brief tornado damaged four homes and several trees.							

=== May 20 event ===
List of confirmed tornadoes – Wednesday, May 20, 2015
EF#	Location	County / Parish	State	Start Coord.	Time (UTC)	Path length	Max width	Damage (2015 USD)
EF0	ESE of Gordonville	Grayson	TX	33.7847°N 96.8082°W	0735–0736	0.31 mi (0.50 km)	30 yd (27 m)	$80,000
EF0	A brief tornado damaged two buildings and destroyed the roof of a marina on the south shore of Lake Texoma.							
EF0	SSW of Brownsville	Haywood	TN	35.5464°N 89.297°W	2030–2031	0.07 mi (0.11 km)	25 yd (23 m)	$0
EF0	A brief tornado touched down and caused no damage.							
EF0	ENE of Decaturville	Decatur	TN	35.5965°N 88.0689°W	2229–2232	1.23 mi (1.98 km)	70 yd (64 m)	$5,000
EF0	A weak tornado moved along an intermittent path, causing minor damage to roofs.							

=== May 21 event ===
List of confirmed tornadoes – Thursday, May 21, 2015
EF#	Location	County / Parish	State	Start Coord.	Time (UTC)	Path length	Max width	Damage (2015 USD)
EF1	E of Bolton	Columbus	NC	34.3227°N 78.3549°W	2013–2021	5 mi (8.0 km)	100 yd (91 m)	$75,000
EF1	A single-wide mobile home and adjacent buildings sustained significant structural damage. Numerous large pine trees were snapped, some of which downed power poles and landed on houses.							

=== May 22 event ===
List of confirmed tornadoes – Friday, May 22, 2015
EF#	Location	County / Parish	State	Start Coord.	Time (UTC)	Path length	Max width	Damage (2015 USD)
EF0	NE of Alpine	Brewster	TX	30.4802°N 103.4601°W	2313–2315	0.41 mi (0.66 km)	100 yd (91 m)	$0
EF0	A brief tornado that caused no damage.							

=== May 23 event ===
List of confirmed tornadoes – Saturday, May 23, 2015
EF#	Location	County / Parish	State	Start Coord.	Time (UTC)	Path length	Max width	Damage (2015 USD)
EF0	WSW of Bosler	Albany	WY	41.5357°N 105.843°W	1855 – 1900	0.3 mi (0.48 km)	35 yd (32 m)	$0
EF0	Tornado remained over open country, causing no damage.							
EF1	W of Pocasset to NNE of Pocasset	Grady	OK	35.19°N 98.0031°W	2212 – 2232	6 mi (9.7 km)	500 yd (460 m)	—N/a
EF1	Four houses were damaged by this tornado.							
EF0	N of Sulphur	Murray	OK	34.5245°N 96.97°W	2259 – 2307	3 mi (4.8 km)	40 yd (37 m)	—N/a
EF0	Tornado damaged a workshop building.							
EF0	ESE of Ada	Pontotoc	OK	34.7562°N 96.6393°W	2305	0.2 mi (0.32 km)	20 yd (18 m)	$0
EF0	Brief tornado remained over open country, causing no damage.							
EF0	NNW of Davis	Murray	OK	34.5699°N 97.1501°W	2310 – 2311	0.5 mi (0.80 km)	50 yd (46 m)	$0
EF0	Brief tornado remained over open country, causing no damage.							
EF1	E of Blanchard	McClain	OK	35.132°N 97.6165°W	2311 – 2317	2 mi (3.2 km)	50 yd (46 m)	—N/a
EF1	Ten homes were damaged by this tornado.							
EF0	S of Stratford	Garvin	OK	—N/a	2316	0.2 mi (0.32 km)	50 yd (46 m)	$0
EF0	Brief tornado remained over open country, causing no damage.							
EF1	NE of Francis	Pontotoc, Seminole	OK	—N/a	2325 – 2333	3.75 mi (6.04 km)	100 yd (91 m)	$0
EF1	Tornado caused significant tree damage along its path.							
EF0	WSW of Newcastle	McClain	OK	—N/a	2330 – 2332	0.5 mi (0.80 km)	50 yd (46 m)	$0
EF0	Tornado remained over open country causing no damage.							
EF1	SE of Maysville	Garvin	OK	—N/a	0005	0.5 mi (0.80 km)	50 yd (46 m)	$0
EF1	A barn was destroyed by this brief tornado.							
EF0	N of Holdenville	Hughes	OK	—N/a	0013	0.2 mi (0.32 km)	50 yd (46 m)	$0
EF0	Brief tornado remained over open country, causing no damage.							
EF1	SSW of Balcones Heights	Bexar	TX	29.4430°N 98.575°W	0116 – 0117	0.4 mi (0.64 km)	150 yd (140 m)	Unknown
EF1	One home sustained major damage to its roof, and additional residences nearby sustained generally minor damage to their roofs and vehicles. A home's carport had its roof removed and displaced two blocks to the north. Trees were damaged.							
EF0	SE of Panola	Latimer	OK	34.8785°N 95.1722°W	0144 – 0147	1.6 mi (2.6 km)	75 yd (69 m)	$0
EF0	Large tree limbs were snapped by this weak tornado.							
EF0	SE of Dripping Springs	Hays	TX	30.1269°N 98.0909°W	0153 – 0200	5.71 mi (9.19 km)	100 yd (91 m)	Unknown
EF0	Approximately 15 homes and numerous trees were damaged along the path.							
EF1	NNW of Jonestown	Travis	TX	30.5465°N 97.9708°W	0158 – 0200	1.29 mi (2.08 km)	200 yd (180 m)	Unknown
EF1	A residence sustained roof and exterior wall damage as its front and back porches were destroyed.							
EF0	Hays	Travis	TX	30.1533°N 97.8694°W	0211 – 0213	2.51 mi (4.04 km)	200 yd (180 m)	Unknown
EF0	Significant tree damage and minor roof damage was observed in Hays							
EF1	N of Liberty Hill	Williamson	TX	30.6909°N 97.9411°W	0222 – 0234	3.08 mi (4.96 km)	200 yd (180 m)	Unknown
EF1	Damage was largely confined to large oak trees. Seven to ten homes sustained damage mainly to their roofs, the most substantial instance being the complete less of a chimney. A barn had part of its roof ripped off.							
EF0	NE of Jonestown	Travis, Williamson	TX	30.5155°N 97.8883°W	0237 – 0238	1.16 mi (1.87 km)	125 yd (114 m)	Unknown
EF0	Damage to trees and a school occurred.							
EF1	Wells Branch	Travis	TX	30.365°N 97.685°W	0239 – 0242	0.6 mi (0.97 km)	250 yd (230 m)	Unknown
EF1	A business in town had its sheet metal roofing peeled back, and a stone brick sign was demolished. At an apartment complex, roofing shingles were damaged, large tree limbs were snapped, and a garbage dumpster was tossed. The second floor of a storage facility had its metal roof and walls collapsed. The tornado lifted and tossed 10 small moving trailers. Several power poles were blown over and additional tree limbs were snapped.							
EF1	N of Wyldwood	Bastrop	TX	30.1692°N 97.494°W	0243 – 0244	0.81 mi (1.30 km)	200 yd (180 m)	Unknown
EF1	Several trees were uprooted, with several oaks sustaining substantial damage. Roof damage occurred at a residence.							
EF0	WSW of Andice	Williamson	TX	30.7665°N 97.925°W	0247–0248	0.26 mi (0.42 km)	50 yd (46 m)	Unknown
EF0	Tree and minor roof damage occurred along the path.							
EF1	NE of Leander	Williamson	TX	30.611°N 97.805°W	0247 – 0250	0.55 mi (0.89 km)	150 yd (140 m)	Unknown
EF1	Large tree limbs were snapped. Two homes sustained damage: one had a small portion of its roofing decking removed, while the second had over half of its roofing decking removed. Two large storage sheds were moved 20 yd (18 m).							

=== May 24 event ===
List of confirmed tornadoes – Sunday, May 24, 2015
EF#	Location	County / Parish	State	Start Coord.	Time (UTC)	Path length	Max width	Damage (2015 USD)
EF1	Western Corpus Christi	Nueces	TX	—N/a	0627 – 0630	2.62 mi (4.22 km)	100 yd (91 m)	$750,000
EF1	Numerous trees were snapped or uprooted, some of which fell on houses and vehicles. A flower nursery and a grocery store were damaged, and a baseball dugout was destroyed. Several residences sustained minor to moderate roof and siding damage as well.							
EF1	Northern Irving	Dallas	TX	—N/a	0734 – 0736	1.13 mi (1.82 km)	80 yd (73 m)	$600,000
EF1	Several trees, two high rise buildings, and several carports were damaged.							
EF1	Northwestern Dallas	Dallas	TX	—N/a	0734 – 0737	4.91 mi (7.90 km)	40 yd (37 m)	$100,000
EF1	Trees and power lines were damaged. An apartment complex and several warehouse buildings sustained roof damage.							
EF1	Southwestern Houston	Harris	TX	29.674°N 95.528°W	1133 – 1138	0.5 mi (0.80 km)	50 yd (46 m)	$200,000
EF1	Ten structures at an apartment complex sustained roof damage, including one with complete roof removal and interior wall damage. A twelve-story glass facade building had several of its north-facing windows blown out.							
EF1	S of Marshall	Harrison	TX	32.3588°N 94.3589°W	1634 – 1636	1.89 mi (3.04 km)	128 yd (117 m)	$75,000
EF1	Trees were snapped or uprooted. A house sustained roof damage when its carport was lifted, a small outbuilding was destroyed, and a warehouse sustained roof damage.							
EF1	E of Marshall	Harrison	TX	32.4719°N 94.3364°W	1646 – 1700	9.52 mi (15.32 km)	201 yd (184 m)	Unknown
EF1	Damage was largely confined to snapped or uprooted trees, some of which damaged structures and vehicles.							
EF1	E of Lowry City	St. Clair	MO	38.101°N 93.7149°W	1715 – 1720	5.03 mi (8.10 km)	200 yd (180 m)	$400,000
EF1	Several outbuildings and two homes were severely damaged, and numerous trees were damaged or uprooted.							
EF1	ESE of St. Paul	Lee	IA	40.7551°N 91.4801°W	2242	0.1 mi (0.16 km)	25 yd (23 m)	$10,000
EF1	A barn and a grain bin were destroyed, a couple of chimneys were damaged, and some trees and a power line were downed.							
EF0	W of Merriman	Cherry	NE	42.92°N 101.9965°W	2245	0.1 mi (0.16 km)	20 yd (18 m)	$0
EF0	Brief landspout tornado remained over open rangeland, causing no damage.							
EF0	W of Merriman	Cherry	NE	42.92°N 101.9925°W	2245	0.1 mi (0.16 km)	20 yd (18 m)	$0
EF0	Law enforcement reported a brief landspout tornado in open rangeland.							
EF1	W of Theodosia	Ozark	MO	36.5844°N 92.7068°W	2259 – 2308	4.66 mi (7.50 km)	200 yd (180 m)	$75,000
EF1	A tornado damaged or destroyed three barns, caused minor damage to a mobile home, and snapped or uprooted hundreds of trees.							
EF2	N of New Boston	Mercer	IL	41.2527°N 90.9854°W	2350 – 0000	6.75 mi (10.86 km)	50 yd (46 m)	$30,000
EF2	A large machine shed and two garages were completely destroyed, and a house had a portion of its roof ripped off. Additional trees and outbuildings were damaged.							
EF1	NNE of Kismet to N of Plains	Seward, Meade	KS	37.2318°N 100.6849°W	0237 – 0321	10.87 mi (17.49 km)	1,200 yd (1,100 m)	$1,000,000
EF1	Irrigation pivots were damaged by this large wedge tornado.							
EF0	W of Hayne	Seward	KS	37.0975°N 100.818°W	0247 – 0249	0.71 mi (1.14 km)	150 yd (140 m)	$0
EF0	Tornado remained over open country causing no damage.							
EF0	NE of Plains	Meade	KS	37.3006°N 100.539°W	0306 – 0314	2.4 mi (3.9 km)	100 yd (91 m)	$0
EF0	Tornado remained over open country, causing no damage.							
EF0	N of Plains	Meade	KS	37.3399°N 100.5342°W	0320 – 0334	3.1 mi (5.0 km)	100 yd (91 m)	$0
EF0	Tornado remained over open country, causing no damage.							
EF1	NNE of Plains to SE of Montezuma	Meade, Gray	KS	37.4104°N 100.4592°W	0347 – 0430	13.2 mi (21.2 km)	800 yd (730 m)	Unknown
EF1	Numerous pivot irrigation sprinklers were damaged by this large wedge tornado.							
EF2	SW of Dodge City	Meade, Ford	KS	37.5337°N 100.3193°W	0426 – 0515	14.62 mi (23.53 km)	250 yd (230 m)	Unknown
EF2	High voltage transmission lines and poles, pivot irrigation sprinklers, trees, and a home were damaged by this large wedge tornado. The home had a large stock trailer thrown into it. A car was tossed 100 yd (91 m) to the northeast.							

=== May 25 event ===
List of confirmed tornadoes – Monday, May 25, 2015
EF#	Location	County / Parish	State	Start Coord.	Time (UTC)	Path length	Max width	Damage (2015 USD)
EF0	NNW of Grantsville	Utah	UT	40.69°N 112.5°W	0120	Unknown	Unknown	Unknown
EF0	A weak tornado touched down in a remote area of Tooele County, no damage was reported.							
EF1	S of Dodge City	Ford	KS	37.6688°N 100.0987°W	0520 – 0532	6.43 mi (10.35 km)	75 yd (69 m)	Unknown
EF1	A few pivot irrigation sprinklers, trees, and a home were damaged.							
EF0	WSW of Amory	Monroe	MS	33.9464°N 88.635°W	1341 – 1347	4.12 mi (6.63 km)	70 yd (64 m)	$50,000
EF0	Trees were snapped or uprooted, some of which damaged the roof of several homes.							
EF1	Amory	Monroe	MS	33.9816°N 88.4885°W	1351 – 1357	2.51 mi (4.04 km)	150 yd (140 m)	$150,000
EF1	Numerous trees in town were snapped or uprooted, some of which damaged the roofs of homes, carports, and storage sheds, and power poles were bent. A few homes had areas of shingles removed.							
EF1	S of Loraine	Mitchell	TX	32.3994°N 100.7172°W	1400 – 1401	0.16 mi (0.26 km)	50 yd (46 m)	$40,000
EF1	A barn had several of its walls collapsed and a pole with a cement base pulled out of the ground. Debris from the barn was impaled through a nearby house.							
EF0	NNE of Sweetwater	Fisher	TX	32.54°N 100.4°W	1445 – 1448	1.06 mi (1.71 km)	40 yd (37 m)	$0
EF0	The public observed a tornado along Texas State Highway 70. It remained over open country and caused no damage.							
EF0	W of Louisville	Winston	MS	33.1054°N 89.1826°W	1519 – 1521	0.94 mi (1.51 km)	25 yd (23 m)	$20,000
EF0	Multiple trees were uprooted and multiple large branches were downed. A small boat was lofted several yards.							
EF0	Fort Lauderdale Beach	Broward	FL	26.1122°N 80.1041°W	1600 – 1601	0.06 mi (0.097 km)	10 yd (9.1 m)	$0
EF0	A waterspout moved ashore Fort Lauderdale Beach, causing four injuries when an inflatable bounce house was lofted into the air.							
EF1	Marshall	Harrison	TX	32.4719°N 94.3364°W	1646 – 1700	9.54 mi (15.35 km)	201 yd (184 m)	$300,000
EF1	Numerous trees and power lines were downed, and falling trees damaged several homes in town.							
EF1	E of Fredericksburg	Gillespie	TX	30.2462°N 98.8038°W	1733 – 1736	2.39 mi (3.85 km)	100 yd (91 m)	Unknown
EF1	A water pump station lost its roof and a brick wall; additional damage was largely confined to trees.							
EF0	NW of Johnson City	Blanco	TX	30.3375°N 98.4931°W	1804 – 1809	4.85 mi (7.81 km)	200 yd (180 m)	Unknown
EF0	Numerous trees and two barns were damaged.							
EF1	NE of Lampasas	Lampasas	TX	—N/a	1841 – 1842	0.42 mi (0.68 km)	90 yd (82 m)	$35,000
EF1	Several trees were damaged and a home had a large portion of its roof ripped off.							
EF1	N of Kempner	Lampasas	TX	—N/a	1842 – 1845	1.53 mi (2.46 km)	180 yd (160 m)	$85,000
EF1	Several buildings were damaged, including two houses that had a majority of their roofs removed.							
EF1	NNW of Copperas Cove	Coryell	TX	—N/a	1906 – 1914	5.66 mi (9.11 km)	600 yd (550 m)	$90,000
EF1	All but one tree at a historic cemetery was damaged and/or uprooted. Six homes were damaged, one of which had roofing material removed.							
EF0	Eastern Sherman	Grayson	TX	—N/a	1925 – 1928	1.71 mi (2.75 km)	30 yd (27 m)	$20,000
EF0	A tornado produced minimal damage over open construction areas.							
EF3	WSW of Blue to E of Caney	Bryan, Atoka	OK	—N/a	1942 – 2020	18.8 mi (30.3 km)	700 yd (640 m)	$0
EF3	1 death – A few mobile homes were completely destroyed while other houses were damaged, some significantly. The fatality occurred when a mobile home was completely destroyed.							
EF1	W of Georgetown	Williamson	TX	30.638°N 97.731°W	1945–1947	0.33 mi (0.53 km)	100 yd (91 m)	$50,000
EF1	Several large trees were damaged or uprooted on a private residence and ranch. The main ranch house sustained minor roof damage, with its chimney completely destroyed. A small garage was severely damaged and had its roof tossed 100 yd (91 m).							
EF2	NNW of Bentley	Atoka	OK	—N/a	2029 – 2041	8 mi (13 km)	1,000 yd (910 m)	$0
EF2	Trees were uprooted and a number of houses were damaged.							
EF0	NE of Duplex	Fannin	TX	—N/a	2041 – 2043	2.43 mi (3.91 km)	100 yd (91 m)	$65,000
EF0	Several trees were damaged or uprooted. The roof of a church and two homes were damaged.							
EF0	near Kirvin	Freestone	TX	—N/a	2055 – 2056	0.33 mi (0.53 km)	25 yd (23 m)	$5,000
EF0	A brief tornado produced minor crop damage.							
EF2	W of Cameron	Milam	TX	—N/a	2055 – 2105	8.88 mi (14.29 km)	400 yd (370 m)	$760,000
EF2	1 death – Approximately 12 houses, mobile homes, or farm buildings were damaged or destroyed. Multiple trees were damaged as well. Fatality occurred when a manufactured home was completely destroyed.							
EF1	NE of Atoka	Atoka	OK	—N/a	2106 – 2108	1 mi (1.6 km)	400 yd (370 m)	$0
EF1	Emergency management and trained storm spotters observed a tornado.							
EF1	W of Cedar Creek	Bastrop	TX	30.085°N 97.542°W	2124 – 2133	3.05 mi (4.91 km)	440 yd (400 m)	Unknown
EF1	Many trees were snapped or uprooted. A few barns and a greenhouse were destroyed, and 12 homes were damaged. One person was critically injured.							
EF2	ESE of Clayton to SSW of Talihina	Pushmataha, Latimer	OK	34.552°N 95.2235°W	2152 – 2212	13.3 mi (21.4 km)	1,000 yd (910 m)	$45,000
EF2	An outbuilding was destroyed and several homes were damaged. Power poles were downed and numerous trees were snapped or uprooted.							
EF1	E of Whitesboro	Le Flore	OK	34.6469°N 94.8628°W	2217 – 2225	6.4 mi (10.3 km)	600 yd (550 m)	$10,000
EF1	Numerous trees were snapped or uprooted and power poles were blown down.							
EF1	NE of Fanshawe	Le Flore	OK	34.9734°N 94.8709°W	2234 – 2249	7.5 mi (12.1 km)	250 yd (230 m)	$0
EF1	Numerous trees were snapped.							
EF2	ENE of Wister to NW of Panama	Le Flore	OK	34.9835°N 94.6658°W	2248 – 2307	15.5 mi (24.9 km)	1,700 yd (1,600 m)	$500,000
EF2	At least two mobile homes were destroyed; other barns and outbuildings were also destroyed. Several homes were severely damaged while a number of others sustained roof damage. A cellular communication tower was partially collapsed, power poles were down, and numerous trees were snapped or uprooted.							
EF1	SE of Ola	Yell	AR	—N/a	2335 – 2336	0.43 mi (0.69 km)	100 yd (91 m)	$5,000
EF1	Some trees and power lines were downed.							
EF1	E of Ola	Yell	AR	—N/a	2340 – 2344	1.91 mi (3.07 km)	250 yd (230 m)	$300,000
EF1	A home, some chicken houses, and several outbuildings were damaged; one chicken house was destroyed. Some trees and power lines were downed.							
EF0	SE of Floresville	Wilson	TX	29.099°N 98.13°W	2310 – 2314	1.7 mi (2.7 km)	50 yd (46 m)	Unknown
EF0	A carport awning to a business was ripped off and a few tree limbs were downed.							
EF1	WNW of Swiss Alp	Fayette	TX	29.787°N 96.951°W	2316 – 2324	4.06 mi (6.53 km)	100 yd (91 m)	Unknown
EF1	Two homes sustained substantial roof damage, multiple barns sustained roof damage, a few small outbuildings were destroyed, and several trees were snapped at their trunks.							
EF2	Henderson	Rusk	TX	32.1177°N 94.9438°W	2347 – 0006	19.45 mi (31.30 km)	600 yd (550 m)	$250,000
EF2	Numerous trees were snapped or uprooted, several power poles were snapped, and several homes sustained minor to moderate damage in and around town.							
EF0	W of Pandora	Wilson	TX	29.247°N 97.874°W	2357 – 0002	1.81 mi (2.91 km)	150 yd (140 m)	Unknown
EF0	Crops were damaged, a few trees were uprooted and several large limbs were snapped, a mobile home had its skirting damaged and the tin roof to a patio cover peeled off, a metal carport was collapsed, a residence sustained shingle damage, and a small barn was heavily damaged.							
EF1	SSW of Beckville to NE of DeBerry	Panola	TX	32.24°N 94.4566°W	0018 – 0043	21.6 mi (34.8 km)	1,251 yd (1,144 m)	$600,000
EF1	Trees were snapped or uprooted, several of which damaged homes upon falling, and outbuildings sustained some damage.							
EF1	SE of Shreveport	Caddo	LA	32.3891°N 93.7903°W	0112 – 0113	0.43 mi (0.69 km)	91 yd (83 m)	$500,000
EF1	Trees were snapped or uprooted, several of which caused major damage to homes upon falling.							

=== May 26 event ===
List of confirmed tornadoes – Tuesday, May 26, 2015
EF#	Location	County / Parish	State	Start Coord.	Time (UTC)	Path length	Max width	Damage (2015 USD)
EF1	Kenner	Jefferson	LA	29.9718°N 90.2467°W	0622 – 0623	0.37 mi (0.60 km)	100 yd (91 m)	Unknown
EF1	Hardwood trees were snapped, homes and a business sustained structural damage, and a single family home had its roof peeled back.							
EF1	WSW of Otter Creek	Jackson	IA	42.2293°N 90.7467°W	1459 – 1500	0.13 mi (0.21 km)	25 yd (23 m)	$0
EF1	Damage was largely confined to trees.							
EF1	S of Atkinson	Henry	IL	41.3229°N 90.0515°W	1459 – 1504	4 mi (6.4 km)	50 yd (46 m)	$10,000
EF1	Damage was largely confined to trees and outbuildings.							
EF1	NE of Kasbeer	Bureau	IL	41.5204°N 89.4423°W	1546 – 1549	2.4 mi (3.9 km)	50 yd (46 m)	$15,000
EF1	A machine shed and trees were damaged.							
EF0	SW of Monticello	Green	WI	42.7004°N 89.6461°W	1723 – 1724	0.05 mi (0.080 km)	20 yd (18 m)	$0
EF0	The public observed a brief tornado in an open field.							
EF0	E of Summit	Cook	IL	41.7773°N 87.8038°W	1808 – 1809	0.4 mi (0.64 km)	50 yd (46 m)	$10,000
EF0	A few weak hardwood trees were snapped and several large branches were downed; a structure sustained minor roof damage; a wooden fence was partially downed; an electrical pole was cracked at the base.							
EF1	W of Warm Springs to NW of Woodbury	Meriwether	GA	32.89°N 84.71°W	1941 – 1955	9.75 mi (15.69 km)	350 yd (320 m)	$100,000
EF1	Numerous large trees were snapped or uprooted.							
EF1	Southwestern Beavercreek	Greene	OH	39.6968°N 84.1031°W	2116 – 2117	0.59 mi (0.95 km)	70 yd (64 m)	$750,000
EF1	At least 5 cars were lifted and rolled while 22 others sustained damage. A restaurant and strip mall sustained roof, window, and awning damage. A gym had its brick roof facade partially collapsed and a rooftop HVAC unit blown off. Several homes suffered roof damage. Numerous trees were downed.							
EF0	W of Palo Pinto	Palo Pinto	TX	—N/a	2240 – 2242	2.16 mi (3.48 km)	75 yd (69 m)	$0
EF0	Amateur radio operators observed a tornado over ranch land.							
EF0	Metcalf Gap area	Palo Pinto	TX	—N/a	2306 – 2308	0.5 mi (0.80 km)	60 yd (55 m)	$0
EF0	Trees and ranch land were damaged.							
EF0	NE of Gordon	Palo Pinto	TX	—N/a	2329 – 2330	0.63 mi (1.01 km)	80 yd (73 m)	$0
EF0	Ranch land sustained minimal damage.							
EF0	E of Weatherford	Caddo, Custer	OK	—N/a	2332	0.1 mi (0.16 km)	30 yd (27 m)	$0
EF0	A well house was tossed across a road, a heavy cattle feeder was displaced, and a picnic table and gas grill were blown off a house patio.							

=== May 27 event ===
List of confirmed tornadoes – Wednesday, May 27, 2015
EF#	Location	County / Parish	State	Start Coord.	Time (UTC)	Path length	Max width	Damage (2015 USD)
EF0	SSE of Blanco	Blanco	TX	30°N 98.38°W	1646 – 1648	0.33 mi (0.53 km)	10 yd (9.1 m)	$0
EF0	An emergency manager reported a tornado that caused no damage.							
EF0	NW of Wauneta	Yuma	CO	40.33°N 102.3°W	1910 – 1915	0.5 mi (0.80 km)	25 yd (23 m)	$0
EF0	A storm chaser reported a tornado.							
EF0	ENE of Winona	Logan	KS	39.0595°N 101.1764°W	2000 – 2010	2.24 mi (3.60 km)	25 yd (23 m)	$0
EF0	An emergency manager reported a tornado that was intermittently on the ground and caused no damage.							
EF0	S of Amy	Lane	KS	38.29°N 100.56°W	2003 – 2008	0.28 mi (0.45 km)	50 yd (46 m)	$0
EF0	A storm chaser reported a landspout tornado.							
EF0	SW of Dighton	Lane	KS	38.3395°N 100.5264°W	2102 – 2110	1.49 mi (2.40 km)	100 yd (91 m)	$0
EF0	A trained storm spotter reported a landspout tornado.							
EF0	S of Dighton	Lane	KS	38.3618°N 100.483°W	2121 – 2126	0.83 mi (1.34 km)	75 yd (69 m)	$0
EF0	A storm chaser reported a landspout tornado.							
EF0	SW of Amy	Lane	KS	38.3829°N 100.7269°W	2124 – 2129	1.43 mi (2.30 km)	100 yd (91 m)	$0
EF0	A storm chaser reported a tornado.							
EF2	NW of Canadian	Hemphill	TX	35.974°N 100.423°W	2158 – 2212	1.39 mi (2.24 km)	1,200 yd (1,100 m)	$0
EF2	Two temporary mobile homes were lofted 50–70 yd (46–64 m) and destroyed, and two pickup trucks were lofted a similar distance. Trees sustained some minor debarking as well.							
EF0	N of Satanta	Haskell	KS	37.5972°N 100.9655°W	2210 – 2215	0.49 mi (0.79 km)	75 yd (69 m)	$0
EF0	An emergency manager reported a landspout tornado.							
EF1	NW of Sublette	Haskell	KS	37.591°N 100.9512°W	2214 – 2227	2.39 mi (3.85 km)	150 yd (140 m)	$1,000,000
EF1	Pivot irrigation sprinklers sustained upper-end EF1 damage. Several outbuildings and eight large grain bins were damaged. A semi-trailer truck was flipped and carried into a field.							
EF0	S of Alamota	Lane, Finney	KS	38.2756°N 100.3243°W	2245 – 2306	5.04 mi (8.11 km)	125 yd (114 m)	$0
EF0	A storm chaser reported a tornado.							
EF0	NW of Kalvesta	Finney	KS	38.1711°N 100.3317°W	2254 – 2307	3.4 mi (5.5 km)	200 yd (180 m)	$0
EF0	A trained storm spotter observed a tornado over grassland.							
EF1	NW of Canadian	Hemphill	TX	35.94°N 100.435°W	2302 – 2303	1.12 mi (1.80 km)	600 yd (550 m)	$0
EF1	Two tornadoes affected the same region in quick succession, making it nearly impossible to discern which caused what damage.							
EF0	N of Canadian	Hemphill	TX	35.979°N 100.422°W	2305 – 2308	0.53 mi (0.85 km)	400 yd (370 m)	$0
EF0	A weak tornado touched down over open field, causing no damage.							
EF1	NW of Canadian	Hemphill	TX	35.94°N 100.435°W	2305 – 2308	1.12 mi (1.80 km)	600 yd (550 m)	$0
EF1	Two tornadoes affected the same region in quick succession, making it nearly impossible to discern which caused what damage.							
EF0	NNW of Kalvesta	Finney	KS	38.1626°N 100.2928°W	2314 – 2325	2 mi (3.2 km)	100 yd (91 m)	$0
EF0	A storm chaser observed a tornado over grassland.							
EF0	N of Cimarron	Gray	KS	37.9812°N 100.3466°W	0033 – 0037	1 mi (1.6 km)	75 yd (69 m)	$0
EF0	A trained storm spotter reported a tornado.							
EF0	WNW of Fort Stockton	Pecos	TX	31.0052°N 103.2824°W	0035 – 0039	2.17 mi (3.49 km)	100 yd (91 m)	$0
EF0	A storm chaser reported a tornado.							
EF0	WNW of Fort Stockton	Pecos	TX	30.9847°N 103.2585°W	0050 – 0055	4.08 mi (6.57 km)	200 yd (180 m)	$0
EF0	A storm chaser reported a tornado.							

=== May 28 event ===
List of confirmed tornadoes – Thursday, May 28, 2015
EF#	Location	County / Parish	State	Start Coord.	Time (UTC)	Path length	Max width	Damage (2015 USD)
EF1	NNE of Talihina	Le Flore	OK	34.7706°N 95.0412°W	1458 – 1459	0.5 mi (0.80 km)	75 yd (69 m)	$50,000
EF1	A residence was severely damaged, and numerous trees were snapped or uprooted.							
EF1	Highfill	Benton	AR	36.2571°N 94.3576°W	1909 – 1912	1.6 mi (2.6 km)	100 yd (91 m)	$25,000
EF1	Trees were uprooted or had their trunks snapped, two small outbuildings had their metal roof panels removed, and a residence had a small portion of its roof ripped off.							
EF0	S of Bella Vista	Benton	AR	36.4019°N 94.2351°W	1940	0.2 mi (0.32 km)	50 yd (46 m)	$10,000
EF0	Trees limbs were snapped and barns were damaged.							
EF0	SE of Tribune	Greeley	KS	—N/a	2014 – 2017	0.5 mi (0.80 km)	20 yd (18 m)	$0
EF0	A trained storm spotter reported a tornado.							
EF0	NW of Gail	Borden	TX	32.9242°N 101.6366°W	2037 – 2039	1.06 mi (1.71 km)	50 yd (46 m)	$0
EF0	A trained storm spotter observed a tornado.							
EF0	S of Kim	Las Animas	CO	37.161°N 103.3548°W	2038 – 2044	0.27 mi (0.43 km)	50 yd (46 m)	$0
EF0	A storm chaser reported a landspout tornado over open country.							
EF0	NW of Lydia	Wichita	KS	—N/a	2053 – 2059	1.91 mi (3.07 km)	50 yd (46 m)	$0
EF0	A trained storm spotter reported a tornado.							
EF0	NW of Lydia	Wichita	KS	—N/a	2107 – 2108	0.25 mi (0.40 km)	25 yd (23 m)	$0
EF0	A trained storm spotter reported a tornado.							
EF0	S of Stratton	Kit Carson	CO	—N/a	2135 – 2140	0.98 mi (1.58 km)	25 yd (23 m)	$0
EF0	An NWS employee observed a tornado.							
EF0	SW of Shallow Water	Scott	KS	38.2951°N 101.1064°W	2150 – 2156	1.85 mi (2.98 km)	75 yd (69 m)	$0
EF0	A storm chaser reported a tornado.							
EF0	SSE of Vilas	Baca	CO	37.2275°N 102.3746°W	2153 – 2156	0.43 mi (0.69 km)	50 yd (46 m)	$0
EF0	Law enforcement reported a landspout tornado.							
EF0	SW of Friend	Finney	KS	38.2519°N 100.9735°W	2209 – 2213	1.67 mi (2.69 km)	75 yd (69 m)	$0
EF0	A storm chaser reported a tornado.							
EF0	E of Grafton	Walsh	ND	48.37°N 97.24°W	2217 – 2221	2 mi (3.2 km)	100 yd (91 m)	$0
EF0	Several trees were snapped and numerous limbs were downed.							
EF0	NNW of Hinckley	Millard	UT	39.27°N 112.85°W	2300	Unknown	Unknown	Unknown
EF0	A Millard County resident spotted a small tornado. No damage was reported.							
EF0	W of Crowell	Foard	TX	—N/a	0213 – 0214	0.5 mi (0.80 km)	50 yd (46 m)	$0
EF0	Storm chasers reported a brief tornado.							

=== May 29 event ===
List of confirmed tornadoes – Friday, May 29, 2015
EF#	Location	County / Parish	State	Start Coord.	Time (UTC)	Path length	Max width	Damage (2015 USD)
EF0	SSW of Baird	Sunflower	MS	33.3874°N 90.6111°W	1540	0.01 mi (0.016 km)	10 yd (9.1 m)	$0
EF0	An emergency manager reported a brief landspout tornado.							
EF1	S of Webbers Falls	Muskogee	OK	35.386°N 95.1402°W	1851 – 1906	5 mi (8.0 km)	400 yd (370 m)	$30,000
EF1	Trees were snapped or uprooted; damage to homes and outbuildings occurred.							
EF0	SE of Gore	Sequoyah	OK	35.487°N 95.09°W	1916 – 1919	1.5 mi (2.4 km)	100 yd (91 m)	$20,000
EF0	Small businesses were damaged and large tree limbs were snapped.							
EF1	WSW of Spavinaw to NW of Eucha	Mayes, Delaware	OK	36.3703°N 95.0809°W	1927 – 1947	9.5 mi (15.3 km)	1,500 yd (1,400 m)	$60,000
EF1	Numerous trees or large tree limbs were snapped or uprooted. Numerous power poles were snapped. The roofs to a couple of homes were damaged.							
EF0	NE of Milnesand	Roosevelt	NM	33.6867°N 103.2955°W	0128 – 0134	3.07 mi (4.94 km)	25 yd (23 m)	$0
EF0	Numerous storm chasers reported a tornado.							
EF1	Carrollton	Greene	IL	—N/a	0420 – 0434	4.68 mi (7.53 km)	200 yd (180 m)	$0
EF1	Numerous trees were uprooted and numerous tree limbs were snapped. One barn was destroyed while a second one had its roof blown off and entire structure shifted. A retail store had a small portion of its roof uplifted, a farm service building had some of its roofing blown off and its southern wall blown inward, a residence had a large portion of its roof ripped off, and a double-wide mobile home had its entire roof removed. Two power poles were snapped.							

=== May 30 event ===
List of confirmed tornadoes – Saturday, May 30, 2015
EF#	Location	County / Parish	State	Start Coord.	Time (UTC)	Path length	Max width	Damage (2015 USD)
EF1	SE of Indianapolis	Marion	IN	39.7415°N 86.0771°W	0047 – 0048	0.28 mi (0.45 km)	40 yd (37 m)	$49,000
EF1	Two homes sustained significant damage: one had it garage door blown inward, its garage slid slightly off its foundation, and its roof damaged, whereas the second also sustained damage to its garage door and had its gazebo destroyed. A nearby trailer was tossed into a pond. Another residence sustained roof damage, two automobiles were stacked atop one another, and trees and power lines were downed.							

=== May 31 event ===
List of confirmed tornadoes – Sunday, May 31, 2015
EF#	Location	County / Parish	State	Start Coord.	Time (UTC)	Path length	Max width	Damage (2015 USD)
EF0	S of Hermitage	Mercer	PA	41.2°N 80.46°W	2000 – 2002	1.1 mi (1.8 km)	250 yd (230 m)	$20,000
EF0	Part of a Sheetz gas station canopy was tossed northward. Numerous wood fence panels were blown away. The back of a pick-up truck was lifted and rotated over 90 degrees. Many large trees and branches were snapped. A home had numerous shingles removed.							

== See also ==
- Tornadoes of 2015
- List of United States tornadoes in April 2015
- List of United States tornadoes from June to August 2015
