= Garry Mize =

American politician (born 1977)

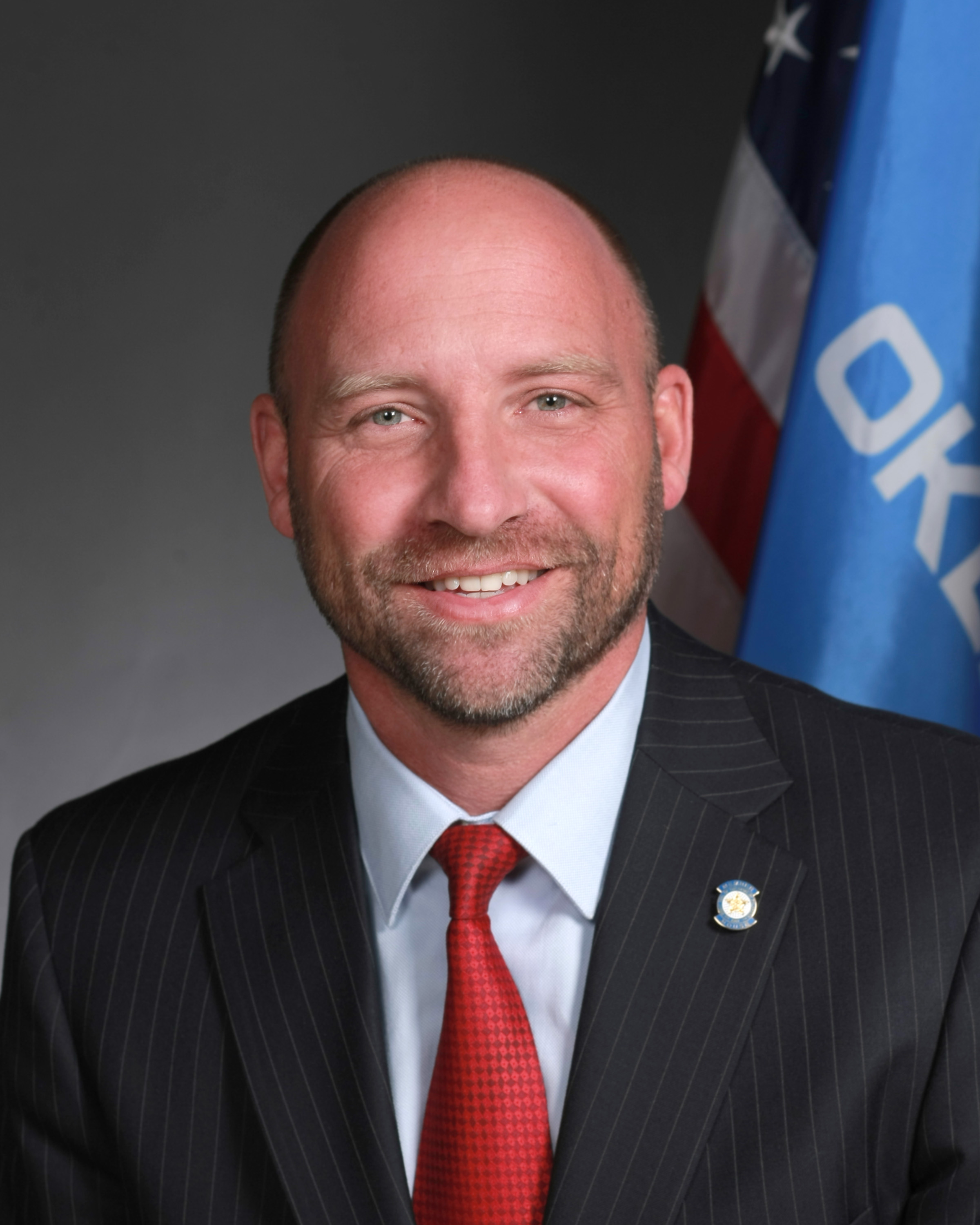

Member of the Oklahoma House of Representatives from the 31st district
- In office November 15, 2018 – November 16, 2022
- Preceded by: Jason Murphey
- Succeeded by: Collin Duel

Personal details
- Born: July 5, 1977 (age 49) Guthrie, Oklahoma
- Party: Republican
- Spouse: Jennifer Mize
- Children: 3

Garry Mize (born July 5, 1977) is an American politician and former athlete who served in the Oklahoma House of Representatives from the 31st district from 2018 to 2022. He did not file for reelection in 2022 and retired at the end of the term.
