= Collin Duel =

American politician

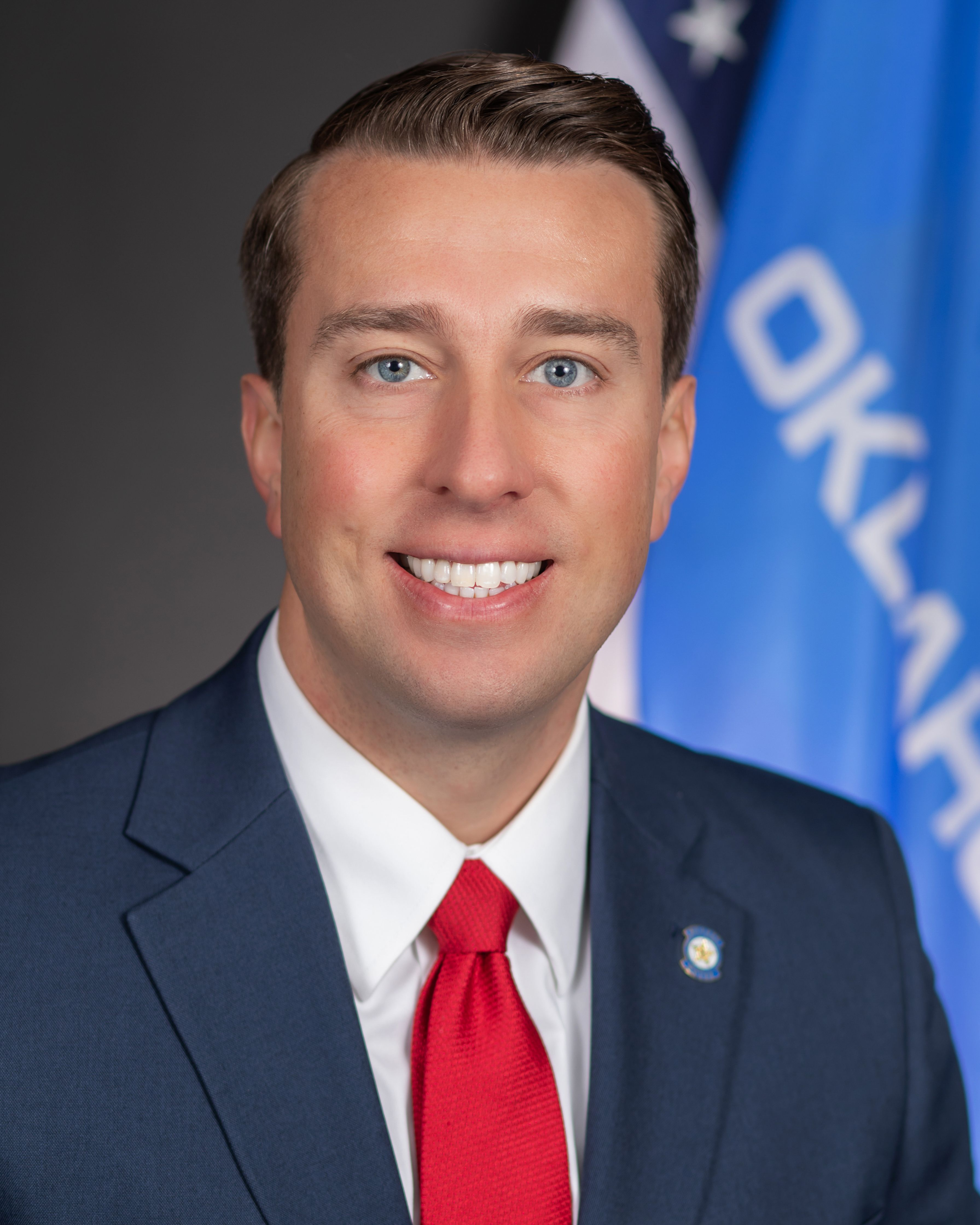

Member of the Oklahoma House of Representatives from the 31st district
- Incumbent
- Assumed office November 16, 2022
- Preceded by: Garry Mize

Personal details
- Party: Republican
- Spouse: Hannah

Military service
- Branch/service: United States Army
- Rank: Sergeant
- Battles/wars: War in Afghanistan

Collin Duel is an American politician. He has served as a Republican member of the Oklahoma House of Representatives from the 31st district since November 16, 2022.

== Early life and education ==
Duel was born and raised in Guthrie, Oklahoma where he attended Guthrie High School, graduating in 2007. After his military career, he earned a bachelor's degree from the University of Oklahoma in International Security Studies and a juris doctor from the University of Oklahoma College of Law.

== Career ==
=== Military career ===
Duel enlisted in the United States Army at age 19. He was an Army Ranger and served four deployments in the War in Afghanistan and was honorably discharged in 2013. During his service he was awarded two Army Commendation medals and he was discharged at the rank of sergeant.

=== Legal career ===
He graduated from the University of Oklahoma College of Law in 2019 and started his own practice, Duel Law.

== Oklahoma House of Representatives ==
Duel officially launched his campaign for the Oklahoma House of Representatives 31st district in August 2021. Two other candidates, Logan Trainer and Karmin Grider, also launched campaigns in the district to succeed retiring incumbent Garry Mize. He advanced to a runoff with Grider. He was supported by the Oklahoma Farm Bureau in both primary elections and endorsed by Governor Kevin Stitt in the Republican runoff election. Duel defeated Grider in the runoff and won the seat since no non-Republican candidate filed for the district. He was sworn in November 16, 2022. As of the 2025 Legislative Session he serves on the Administrative Rules Committee.

== Personal life ==
He is married to his wife Hannah (Hamm). They met in high school through Hannah's older brother Jacob, who was in the same grade as Collin. They have two children. He is a lifetime member of the National Rifle Association of America. He and his family attends Life Church. His uncle is associate district judge Louis Alvin Duel Jr.
