= Dale DePue =

American politician

Member of the Oklahoma House of Representatives from the 31st district
- In office November 2004 – November 2006
- Preceded by: Frank W. Davis
- Succeeded by: Jason Murphey

Personal details
- Born: L. Dale DePue; July 20, 1935 Oklahoma City, Oklahoma, United States
- Died: March 31, 2023 (aged 87) Edmond, Oklahoma, United States
- Party: Republican

L. Dale DePue (July 20, 1935 – March 31, 2023) was an American politician who served in the Oklahoma House of Representatives representing the 31st district from 2004 to 2006.

== Biography ==
L. Dale DePue was born on July 20, 1935, in Oklahoma City to Geraldine and Lionel DePue. He graduated from Northeast High School in 1953 and attended the University of Oklahoma where he played for Oklahoma Sooners football. He graduated in 1959 with a degree in petroleum engineering and worked for the Continental Oil Company. In 1966, he was transferred to Carmi, Illinois, where he became increasingly involved with the First Presbyterian Church. In 1972, he left his oil company job to be a full time pastor until 2000. He served one term in the Oklahoma House of Representatives representing the 31st district from 2004 to 2006 as a member of the Republican Party. He was preceded by Frank W. Davis and succeeded by Jason Murphey. He died on March 31, 2023, in Edmond, Oklahoma.
