= Frank W. Davis =

American politician and lawyer (1936–2018)

Member of the Oklahoma House of Representatives from the 31st district
- In office 1978 – November 2004
- Preceded by: James R. Cummings
- Succeeded by: Dale DePue

Personal details
- Born: August 24, 1936 Ada, Oklahoma, U.S.
- Died: September 9, 2018 (aged 82) Guthrie, Oklahoma, U.S.
- Party: Republican

Frank W. Davis (August 24, 1936 – September 9, 2018) was an American politician and lawyer based in Oklahoma. Born in Ada, Oklahoma, he was a graduate of the Oklahoma University School of Law. A Republican, he served in the Oklahoma House of Representatives for 26 years, from 1978 to 2004.

== Biography ==
He was raised on a farm between Francis and Ada, Oklahoma, in Pontotoc County. He attended the East Central University, where he graduated with a bachelor's degree in history and government in 1958.

Davis began his legal studies at the University of Illinois College of Law and transferred to the University of Oklahoma College of Law, graduating in 1959. He then served as acting postmaster of Ada, and worked for attorney Denny Faulkenburg before assuming the post of Logan County attorney from 1961 to 1965. Davis began his private practice in 1965, and was judge of the Guthrie Municipal Court from 1974 to 1978. He also continued working as a lawyer while he sat on the Oklahoma House of Representatives, where he served as a Republican between 1978 and 2004. Upon leaving the state legislature, Davis focused on his legal practice in Guthrie, Oklahoma. Davis was still practicing law at the time of his death.

Davis died of a heart attack at his home in Guthrie on September 9, 2018. He was survived by his wife and two children.
