= Jason Murphey =

American politician

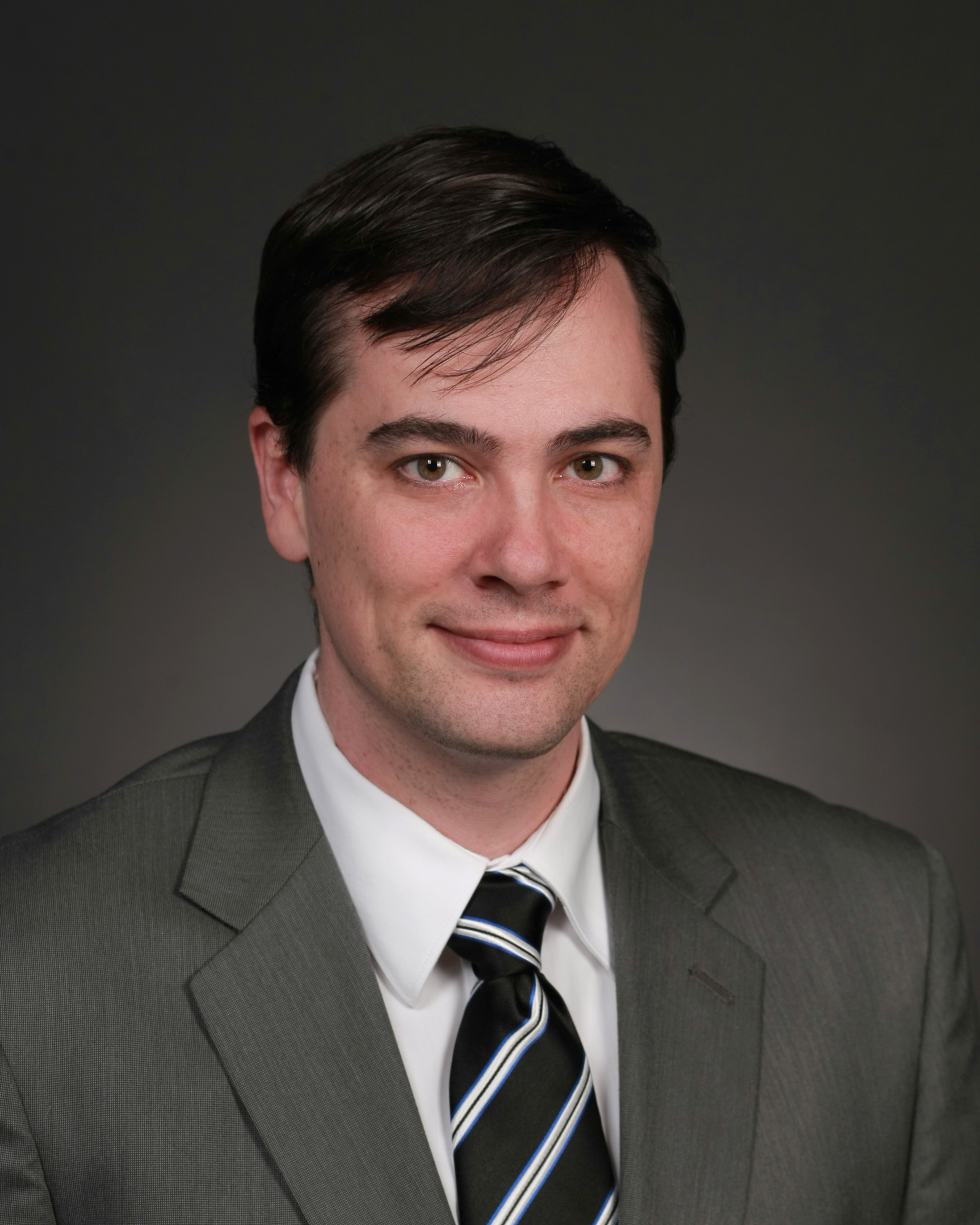

Member of the Oklahoma House of Representatives from the 31st district
- In office 2006–2018
- Preceded by: Dale DePue
- Succeeded by: Garry Mize

Personal details
- Party: Republican
- Website: Official web site

Jason Murphey is an American politician and former Republican State Representative in the US state of Oklahoma. He represented District 31 in the Oklahoma House of Representatives; the district comprised portions of Logan and Oklahoma counties and includes the cities of Edmond and Guthrie. Murphey currently serves as the chair of the Government Modernization Committee and was named to this position prior to the 2009 legislative session. As chair, Murphy was the House author of Senator Glen Coffee's attempt to centralize the state's information technology systems and the Oklahoma Government 2.0 initiative, which resulted in the creation of data.ok.gov.

== Legislative career ==
During his legislative career, Murphey's projects included setting term limits on statewide elected officials, the creation of the data.ok.gov transparency portal, and the co-sponsorship of legislation to centralize of information technology systems in Oklahoma state government. During his first year in office, he authored legislation to lower legislative pay. He is also the author of unsuccessful attempts to end lobbyist gift-giving to legislators and to remove the Oklahoma Legislature's exemption from the state's open records and open meeting laws.

In 2006, Jason Murphey was the only Oklahoma legislative candidate to defeat an incumbent in the 2006 primary/runoff election.

In 2008, Murphey's 12,978 votes represented more votes than any other candidate for the House District 31 seat had received in the history of the district.

In 2010, Murphey won re-election with more votes than any other Oklahoma State House Republican candidate that election season. Murphey's vote total was also the biggest vote tally for a Republican primary candidate in the history of House District 31.

In 2014, Government Technology magazine named Murphey as one of the Tech-Savviest Legislators in the U.S.

On June 24, 2014, Murphey won re-election by capturing more votes than any other Oklahoma House Republican on the ballot that day. He scored the most votes of any State House candidate (3,623) and secured the highest percentage (82.9%).

Murphey will be required to step down in 2018 due to term limits.

=== Lobbyist reform ===
Murphey has been critical of the influence of lobbyists over state politicians. He has refused personal gifts and campaign contributions from lobbyists and the groups that employ them. He proposed legislation that would have created a "no gift" list that legislators could use to refuse lobbyist gifts. In 2016, he proposed legislation to end all lobbyist gift-giving to legislators.

=== Term limits ===
Murphey authored a bill to let constituents vote on establishing term limits on all statewide elected officials. The voters approved the proposal in November 2010.

=== Openness ===
Murphey authored legislation to remove an exemption for the Oklahoma Legislature in the state's open meeting and open records laws. As of 2016, his attempts have been unsuccessful.

== Election history ==
November 8, 2016, Election results for Oklahoma State Representative for District 31
Candidates	Party	Votes	%
Jason W. Murphey	Republican Party	13,626	74.87%
John Tiller	Democratic Party	4,574	25.13%

June 24, 2014, Election results for Oklahoma State Representative for District 31
Candidates	Party	Votes	%
Jason W. Murphey	Republican Party	3,623	82.9%
Andrew Muchmore	Republican Party	626	17.1%

July 27, 2010, Election results for Oklahoma State Representative for District 31
Candidates	Party	Votes	%
Jason W. Murphey	Republican Party	3,981	74.92%
AJ Jones	Republican Party	1,333	25.08%

November 4, 2008, Election results for Oklahoma State Representative for District 31
Candidates	Party	Votes	%
Jason W. Murphey	Republican Party	12,978	69.54%
Jennifer Sherrill	Democratic Party	5,684	30.46%

November 7, 2006, Election results for Oklahoma State Representative for District 31
Candidates	Party	Votes	%
Jason W. Murphey	Republican Party	6,544	57.11%
Thomas R. Cook	Democratic Party	4,914	42.89%

August 22, 2006, Runoff election results for Oklahoma State Representative for District 31
Candidates	Party	Votes	%
Jason W. Murphey	Republican Party	2,012	53.54%
Dale Depue	Republican Party	1,746	46.46%

July 25, 2006, Primary election results for Oklahoma State Representative for District 31
Candidates	Party	Votes	%
Jason W. Murphey	Republican Party	1,792	49.53%
Dale Depue	Republican Party	1,671	46.19%
Wayne M. Hlincky	Republican Party	155	4.28%

August 24, 2004, Runoff election results for Oklahoma State Representative for District 31
Candidates	Party	Votes	%
Jason W. Murphey	Republican Party	1,805	46.69%
Dale Depue	Republican Party	2,061	53.31%

July 27, 2004, Primary election results for Oklahoma State Representative for District 31
Candidates	Party	Votes	%
Jason W. Murphey	Republican Party	1,928	44.51%
WILLIAM W. WHEELER	Republican Party	487	11.24%
STEVEN FARLEY	Republican Party	732	16.90%
Dale Depue	Republican Party	1,004	23.18%
WAYNE M. HLINICKY	Republican Party	92	2.12%
Bill Stoval	Republican Party	89	2.05%
