= Tiawah, Oklahoma =

- Census-designated place
- Location within the state of Oklahoma
- Coordinates: 36°14′55″N 95°32′15″W
- Country: United States
- State: Oklahoma
- County: Rogers

Area
  - Total: 4.11 sq mi (10.64 km^{2})
  - Land: 4.11 sq mi (10.64 km^{2})
  - Water: 0 sq mi (0.00 km^{2})
- Elevation: 604 ft (184 m)

Population (2020)
  - Total: 235
  - Density: 57.2/sq mi (22.09/km^{2})
- Time zone: UTC-6 (Central (CST))
  - Summer (DST): UTC-5 (CDT)
- FIPS code: 40-73600
- GNIS feature ID: 2409318

Tiawah is a census-designated place (CDP) in Rogers County, Oklahoma, United States. As of the 2020 census, Tiawah had a population of 235. It was built on the St. Louis, Iron Mountain, & Southern Railway line running from Coffeyville, Kansas, to Fort Smith, Arkansas. The post office existed from August 24, 1903, until December 31, 1938. It is said to be named for Tiawah Mound in Georgia.

== Geography ==
Tiawah is located at 36°15′25″N 95°32′51″W (36.256876, -95.547602).

According to the United States Census Bureau, the CDP has a total area of 4.1 square miles (10.6 km^{2}), all land.

== Demographics ==
Historical population
Census	Pop.	Note	%±
2000	166		—
2010	189		13.9%
2020	235		24.3%
U.S. Decennial Census

=== 2020 census ===
As of the 2020 census, Tiawah had a population of 235. The median age was 36.5 years. 28.5% of residents were under the age of 18 and 20.9% of residents were 65 years of age or older. For every 100 females there were 117.6 males, and for every 100 females age 18 and over there were 127.0 males age 18 and over.

0.0% of residents lived in urban areas, while 100.0% lived in rural areas.

There were 81 households in Tiawah, of which 18.5% had children under the age of 18 living in them. Of all households, 42.0% were married-couple households, 14.8% were households with a male householder and no spouse or partner present, and 39.5% were households with a female householder and no spouse or partner present. About 30.8% of all households were made up of individuals and 23.5% had someone living alone who was 65 years of age or older.

There were 87 housing units, of which 6.9% were vacant. The homeowner vacancy rate was 8.6% and the rental vacancy rate was 0.0%.

Racial composition as of the 2020 census
Race	Number	Percent
White	166	70.6%
Black or African American	1	0.4%
American Indian and Alaska Native	16	6.8%
Asian	7	3.0%
Native Hawaiian and Other Pacific Islander	0	0.0%
Some other race	3	1.3%
Two or more races	42	17.9%
Hispanic or Latino (of any race)	23	9.8%

=== 2000 census ===
As of the census of 2000, there were 166 people, 57 households, and 49 families residing in the CDP. The population density was 40.5 inhabitants per square mile (15.6/km^{2}). There were 58 housing units at an average density of 14.1/sq mi (5.5/km^{2}). The racial makeup of the CDP was 80.12% White, 18.07% Native American, and 1.81% from two or more races.

There were 57 households, out of which 35.1% had children under the age of 18 living with them, 75.4% were married couples living together, 8.8% had a female householder with no husband present, and 14.0% were non-families. 10.5% of all households were made up of individuals, and 1.8% had someone living alone who was 65 years of age or older. The average household size was 2.91 and the average family size was 3.16.

In the CDP, the population was spread out, with 27.7% under the age of 18, 6.0% from 18 to 24, 27.7% from 25 to 44, 33.1% from 45 to 64, and 5.4% who were 65 years of age or older. The median age was 38 years. For every 100 females, there were 107.5 males. For every 100 females age 18 and over, there were 106.9 males.

The median income for a household in the CDP was $30,625, and the median income for a family was $31,094. Males had a median income of $29,167 versus $15,536 for females. The per capita income for the CDP was $14,673. About 22.0% of families and 20.5% of the population were below the poverty line, including 26.7% of those under the age of eighteen and none of those 65 or over.
