= Francis, Oklahoma =

- Town
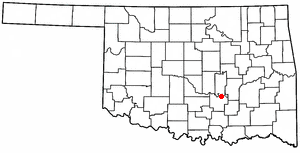
- Location of Francis, Oklahoma
- Coordinates: 34°52′28″N 96°35′33″W
- Country: United States
- State: Oklahoma
- County: Pontotoc

Area
  - Total: 0.56 sq mi (1.45 km^{2})
  - Land: 0.56 sq mi (1.45 km^{2})
  - Water: 0 sq mi (0.00 km^{2})
- Elevation: 951 ft (290 m)

Population (2020)
  - Total: 244
  - Density: 436.4/sq mi (168.51/km^{2})
- Time zone: UTC-6 (Central (CST))
  - Summer (DST): UTC-5 (CDT)
- ZIP code: 74844
- Area code: 580
- FIPS code: 40-27650
- GNIS feature ID: 2412651

Francis is a town in Pontotoc County, Oklahoma, United States. It is old enough to appear on a 1911 map of the county. As of the 2020 census, Francis had a population of 244.

== Geography ==
According to the United States Census Bureau, the town has a total area of 0.6 square miles (1.6 km^{2}), all land.

=== Climate ===
Climate data for Francis, Oklahoma
Month	Jan	Feb	Mar	Apr	May	Jun	Jul	Aug	Sep	Oct	Nov	Dec	Year
Mean daily maximum °F (°C)	50.4 (10.2)	55.8 (13.2)	65.3 (18.5)	74.7 (23.7)	81 (27)	87.9 (31.1)	93.6 (34.2)	93.5 (34.2)	85.7 (29.8)	76.1 (24.5)	63.7 (17.6)	53.5 (11.9)	73.4 (23.0)
Mean daily minimum °F (°C)	27.5 (−2.5)	31.6 (−0.2)	40.4 (4.7)	50.1 (10.1)	58.1 (14.5)	65.9 (18.8)	70.6 (21.4)	69.1 (20.6)	61.9 (16.6)	51.1 (10.6)	40.5 (4.7)	30.8 (−0.7)	49.8 (9.9)
Average precipitation inches (mm)	1.5 (38)	2.2 (56)	3.3 (84)	3.5 (89)	5.6 (140)	4.1 (100)	2.4 (61)	2.9 (74)	4.5 (110)	4.2 (110)	2.8 (71)	2.0 (51)	38.9 (990)
Source 1: weather.com
Source 2: Weatherbase.com

== Demographics ==
Historical population
Census	Pop.	Note	%±
1910	931		—
1920	911		−2.1%
1930	607		−33.4%
1940	370		−39.0%
1950	271		−26.8%
1960	286		5.5%
1970	283		−1.0%
1980	365		29.0%
1990	346		−5.2%
2000	332		−4.0%
2010	315		−5.1%
2020	244		−22.5%
U.S. Decennial Census

=== 2020 census ===
As of the 2020 census, Francis had a population of 244. The median age was 35.3 years. 27.0% of residents were under the age of 18 and 16.8% of residents were 65 years of age or older. For every 100 females there were 98.4 males, and for every 100 females age 18 and over there were 93.5 males age 18 and over.

0.0% of residents lived in urban areas, while 100.0% lived in rural areas.

There were 99 households in Francis, of which 46.5% had children under the age of 18 living in them. Of all households, 48.5% were married-couple households, 13.1% were households with a male householder and no spouse or partner present, and 29.3% were households with a female householder and no spouse or partner present. About 17.2% of all households were made up of individuals and 7.0% had someone living alone who was 65 years of age or older.

There were 112 housing units, of which 11.6% were vacant. The homeowner vacancy rate was 4.6% and the rental vacancy rate was 7.0%.

Racial composition as of the 2020 census
Race	Number	Percent
White	167	68.4%
Black or African American	0	0.0%
American Indian and Alaska Native	46	18.9%
Asian	3	1.2%
Native Hawaiian and Other Pacific Islander	0	0.0%
Some other race	1	0.4%
Two or more races	27	11.1%
Hispanic or Latino (of any race)	7	2.9%

=== 2000 census ===
As of the census of 2000, there were 332 people, 139 households, and 97 families residing in the town. The population density was 567.1 inhabitants per square mile (219.0/km^{2}). There were 155 housing units at an average density of 264.8 per square mile (102.2/km^{2}). The racial makeup of the town was 81.93% White, 12.65% Native American, 0.30% Asian, and 5.12% from two or more races. Hispanic or Latino of any race were 1.51% of the population.

There were 139 households, out of which 30.9% had children under the age of 18 living with them, 51.1% were married couples living together, 15.8% had a female householder with no husband present, and 30.2% were non-families. 28.1% of all households were made up of individuals, and 10.8% had someone living alone who was 65 years of age or older. The average household size was 2.39 and the average family size was 2.89.

In the town, the population was spread out, with 23.5% under the age of 18, 8.7% from 18 to 24, 27.1% from 25 to 44, 26.5% from 45 to 64, and 14.2% who were 65 years of age or older. The median age was 40 years. For every 100 females, there were 88.6 males. For every 100 females age 18 and over, there were 85.4 males.

The median income for a household in the town was $25,083, and the median income for a family was $26,094. Males had a median income of $25,417 versus $18,393 for females. The per capita income for the town was $12,826. About 13.9% of families and 17.1% of the population were below the poverty line, including 6.8% of those under age 18 and 16.2% of those age 65 or over.

== Education ==
It is within the Byng Public Schools school district.

== Notable person ==
- Frank W. Davis, Oklahoma State Representative
