= Matheson, Colorado =

Census-designated place in Elbert County, CO, USA

- Census-designated place
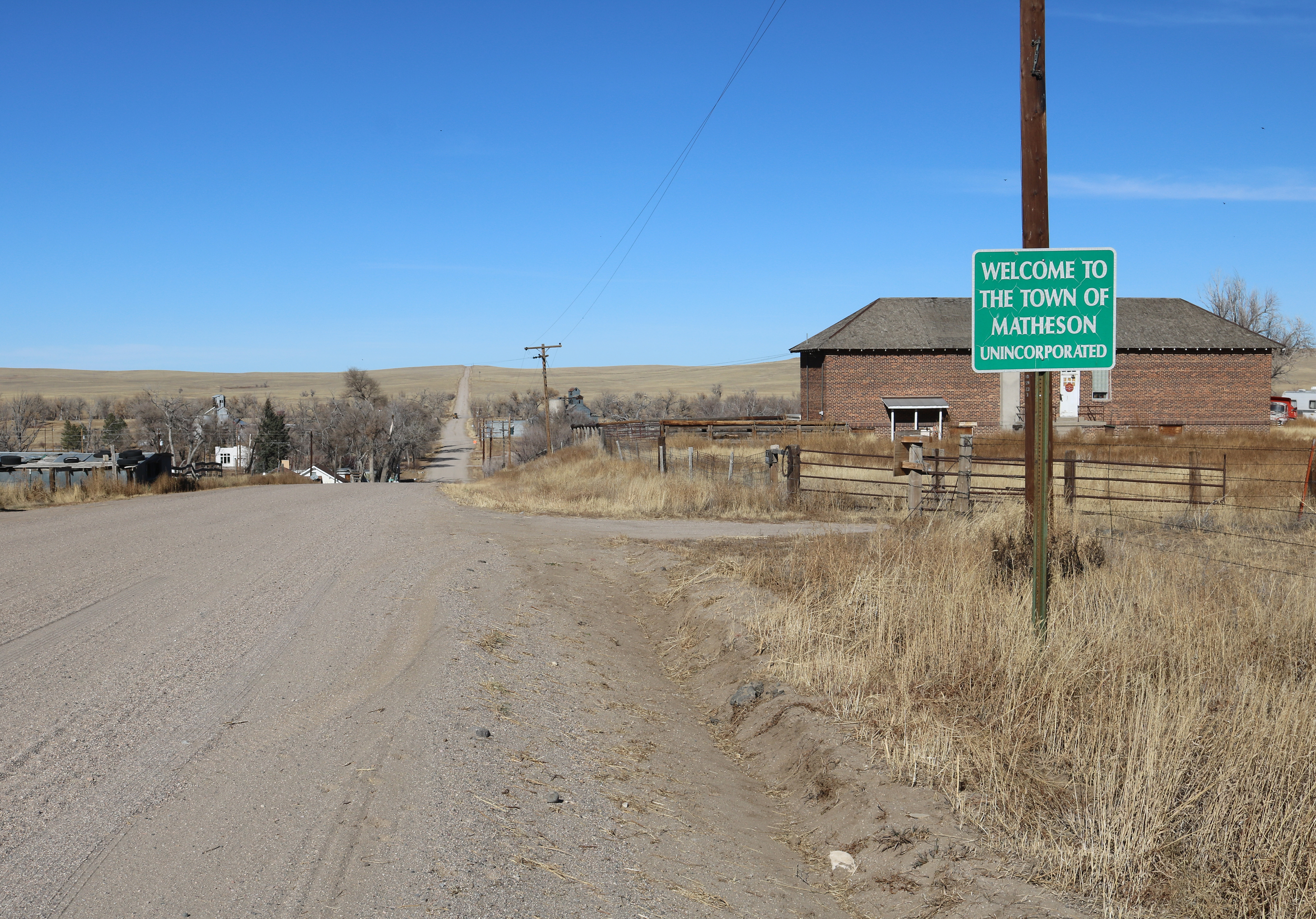
- Looking north on Main Street (County Road 149) from the town's south side, November 2021

- Location of the Matheson CDP in the State of Colorado
- Coordinates: 39°10′06″N 103°58′37″W
- Country: United States
- State: Colorado
- County: Elbert County

Government
  - Type: Unincorporated community

Area
  - Total: 1.716 sq mi (4.444 km^{2})
  - Land: 1.716 sq mi (4.444 km^{2})
  - Water: 0 sq mi (0.00 km^{2})
- Elevation: 5,843 ft (1,781 m)

Population (2020)
  - Total: 79
  - Density: 46/sq mi (18/km^{2})
- Time zone: UTC-7 (MST)
  - Summer (DST): UTC-6 (MDT)
- ZIP Code: 80830
- Area code: 719
- GNIS feature: 2805919

Matheson is a census-designated place (CDP) and post office in and governed by Elbert County, Colorado, United States. The CDP is a part of the Denver–Aurora–Lakewood, CO Metropolitan Statistical Area. The Matheson post office has the ZIP Code 80830. At the United States Census 2020, the population of the Matheson CDP was 79.

== History ==
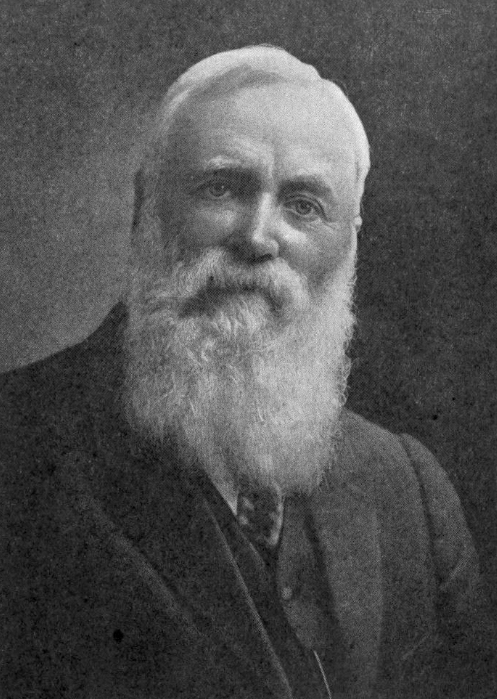
Duncan Matheson

The town was named after Duncan Matheson, the original owner of the town site.

== Geography ==
The Matheson CDP has an area of 1,098 acres (4.444 km^{2}), all land.

== Demographics ==
The United States Census Bureau defined the Matheson CDP for the United States Census 2020.

Matheson CDP, Colorado
Year	Pop.	±%
2020	79	—
Source: United States Census Bureau

== Education ==
The community is in the Big Sandy School District 100J.

== In popular culture ==
The television series Honey, I Shrunk the Kids: The TV Show is set in Matheson, Colorado. However, the series portrays Matheson as much larger, a hub of high-tech industry, and located somewhere in the mountains west of Denver.

== Gallery ==
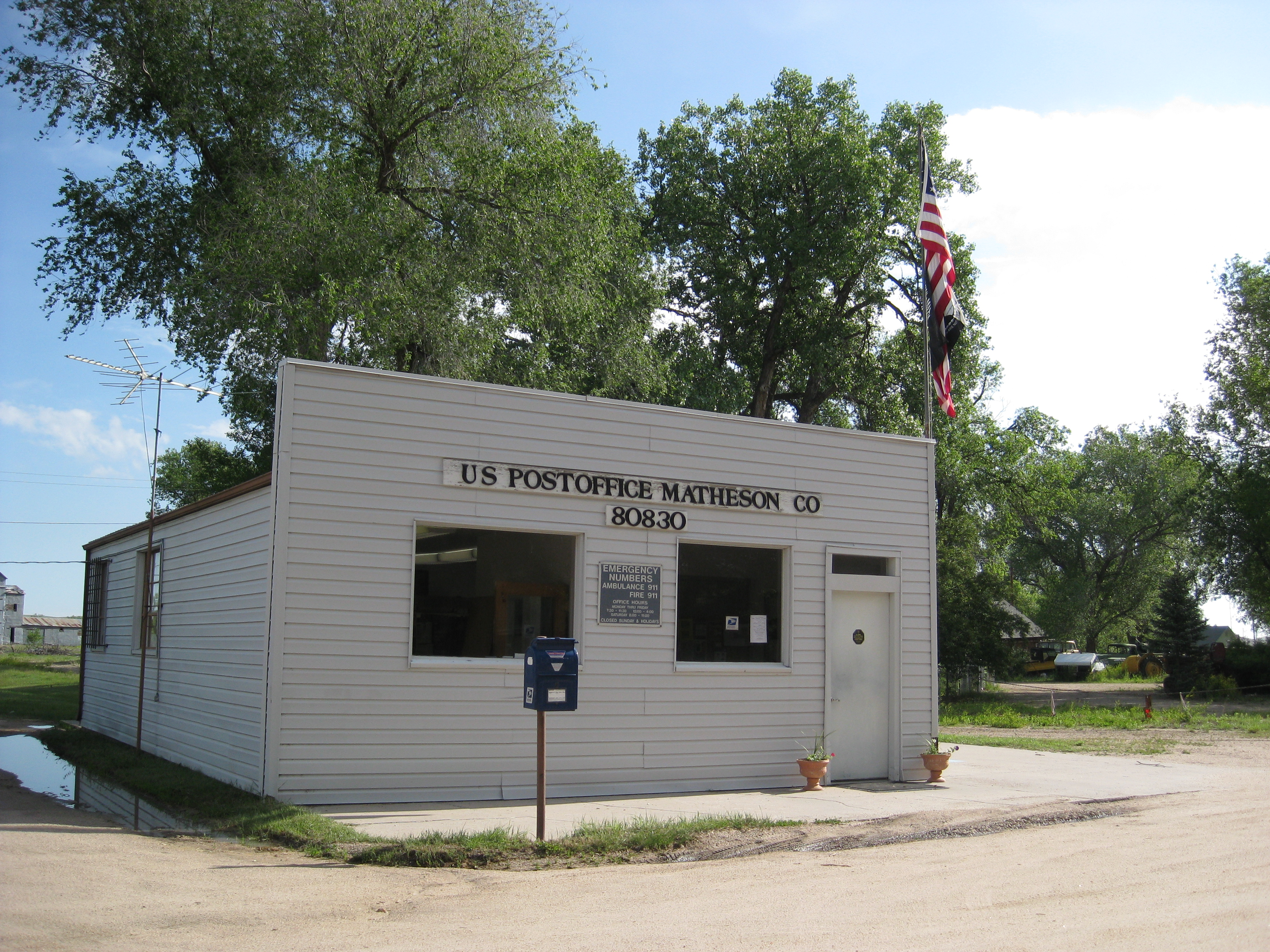
The post office in June 2010

== See also ==
- List of census-designated places in Colorado
