= Balsora, Texas =

Unincorporated community in Texas, US

Coordinates: 33°06′58″N 97°51′07″W

Balsora is an unincorporated community in Wise County, in the U.S. state of Texas.

== History ==
Balsora was originally called Wild Horse Prairie, and under the latter name was founded circa 1890. A post office was established under the name Balsora in 1894, and was discontinued in 1924.
