= Lydia, Kansas =

Unincorporated community in Wichita County, Kansas

- Unincorporated community
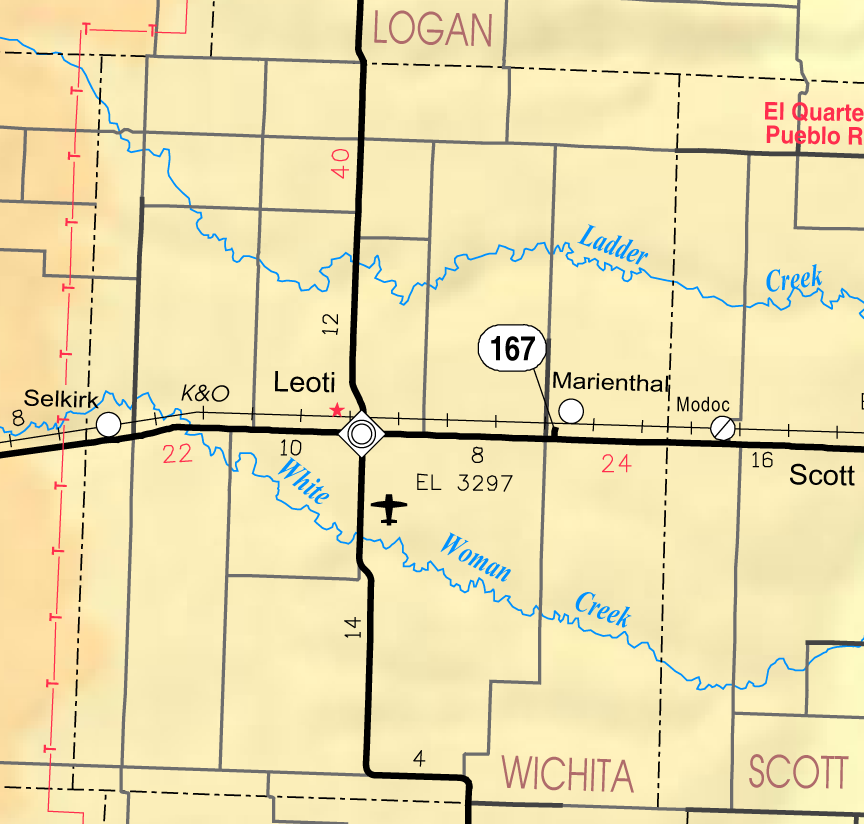
- KDOT map of Wichita County (legend)

- Location within Kansas Location within the United States
- Coordinates: 38°16′42″N 101°17′30″W
- Country: United States
- State: Kansas
- County: Wichita
- Elevation: 3,255 ft (992 m)
- Time zone: UTC-6 (CST)
  - Summer (DST): UTC-5 (CDT)
- Area code: 620
- FIPS code: 20-43300
- GNIS ID: 484564

Lydia is an unincorporated community in Wichita County, Kansas, United States. It is located between Leoti and Lakin.

== History ==
A post office was opened in Lydia in 1888, and remained in operation until it was discontinued in 1928.
