= Soule Canal =

- Soule Canal-Gray County Segment 1
- U.S. National Register of Historic Places
- Location within Kansas Location within the United States
- Location: Between U.S. Routes 50/400 and Soule Ave., Ingalls, Kansas
- Coordinates: 37°49′18″N 100°26′18″W
- Area: Less than five acres
- NRHP reference No.: 14000857
- Added to NRHP: October 15, 2014

- Soule Canal-Gray County Segment 2
- U.S. National Register of Historic Places
- Location: North side of 50/400 east of Ingalls, Kansas
- Coordinates: 37°49′00″N 100°25′28″W
- Area: Less than five acres
- NRHP reference No.: 14000858
- Added to NRHP: October 15, 2014

The Soule Canal is a historic failed irrigation canal in southwest Kansas meant to divert water from the Arkansas River. Two segments near Ingalls, Kansas were listed on the National Register of Historic Places in 2014.

The canal ran from the east edge of Ingalls in Gray County, Kansas east to Spearville in adjacent Ford County. The canal generally followed the line of the Arkansas River, the ATSF railway, and U.S. Highway 50/400.

It became known as Soule's Folly.
