= Crooked Creek Township, Kansas =

Township in Meade County, Kansas, U.S.

Crooked Creek Township
- Township
- Location within Meade County
- Coordinates: 37.411247°N 100.324727°W
- Country: United States
- State: Kansas
- County: Meade

Area
  - Total: 54.184 sq mi (140.34 km^{2})
  - Land: 54.153 sq mi (140.26 km^{2})
  - Water: 0.031 sq mi (0.080 km^{2}) 0.06%

Population (2020)
  - Total: 48
  - Density: 0.89/sq mi (0.34/km^{2})
- Time zone: UTC-6 (CST)
  - Summer (DST): UTC-5 (CDT)
- Area code: 620

Crooked Creek Township is a township in Meade County, Kansas, United States. As of the 2020 census, its population was 48.

== Geography ==
Crooked Creek Township covers an area of 54.184 square miles (140.34 square kilometers).

=== Adjacent townships ===
- East Hess Township, Gray County (northeast)
- Fowler Township, Meade County (east)
- Meade Center Township, Meade County (south)
- Mertilla Township, Meade County (west)
- Montezuma Township, Gray County (northwest)

=== Major highways ===
- K-23
