= Mertilla Township, Kansas =

Township in Meade County, Kansas, U.S.

Mertilla Township
- Township
- Location within Meade County
- Coordinates: 37.395035°N 100.504153°W
- Country: United States
- State: Kansas
- County: Meade

Area
  - Total: 150.356 sq mi (389.42 km^{2})
  - Land: 150.325 sq mi (389.34 km^{2})
  - Water: 0.031 sq mi (0.080 km^{2}) 0.02%

Population (2020)
  - Total: 196
  - Density: 1.30/sq mi (0.503/km^{2})
- Time zone: UTC-6 (CST)
  - Summer (DST): UTC-5 (CDT)
- Area code: 620

Mertilla Township is a township in Meade County, Kansas, United States. As of the 2020 census, its population was 196.

== Geography ==
Mertilla Township covers an area of 150.356 square miles (389.42 square kilometers).

=== Adjacent townships ===
- Montezuma Township, Gray County (north)
- Crooked Creek Township, Meade County (east)
- Meade Center Township, Meade County (southeast)
- West Plains Township, Meade County (south)
- Seward Township, Seward County (southwest)
- Lockport Township, Haskell County (west)
- Copeland Township, Gray County (northwest)
