= Fowler Township, Kansas =

Township in Meade County, Kansas, U.S.

Fowler Township
- Township
- Location within Meade County
- Coordinates: 37.399676°N 100.186723°W
- Country: United States
- State: Kansas
- County: Meade

Area
  - Total: 104.635 sq mi (271.00 km^{2})
  - Land: 104.628 sq mi (270.99 km^{2})
  - Water: 0.007 sq mi (0.018 km^{2}) 0.01%

Population (2020)
  - Total: 651
  - Density: 6.22/sq mi (2.40/km^{2})
- Time zone: UTC-6 (CST)
  - Summer (DST): UTC-5 (CDT)
- Area code: 620

Fowler Township is a township in Meade County, Kansas, United States. As of the 2020 census, its population was 651.

== Geography ==
Fowler Township covers an area of 104.635 square miles (271.00 square kilometers).

=== Communities ===
- Fowler

=== Adjacent townships ===
- Wilburn Township, Ford County (northeast)
- Appleton Township, Clark County (east)
- Logan Township, Meade County (south)
- Meade Center Township, Meade County (southwest)
- Crooked Creek Township, Meade County (west)
- East Hess Township, Gray County (northwest)

=== Major highways ===
- US-54
