= Logan Township, Meade County, Kansas =

Township in Meade County, Kansas, U.S.

Logan Township
- Township
- Location within Meade County
- Coordinates: 37.228352°N 100.163438°W
- Country: United States
- State: Kansas
- County: Meade

Area
  - Total: 109.797 sq mi (284.37 km^{2})
  - Land: 109.788 sq mi (284.35 km^{2})
  - Water: 0.009 sq mi (0.023 km^{2}) 0.01%

Population (2020)
  - Total: 102
  - Density: 0.929/sq mi (0.359/km^{2})
- Time zone: UTC-6 (CST)
  - Summer (DST): UTC-5 (CDT)
- Area code: 620

Logan Township is a township in Meade County, Kansas, United States. As of the 2020 census, its population was 102.

== Geography ==
Logan Township covers an area of 109.797 square miles (284.37 square kilometers).

=== Adjacent townships ===
- Fowler Township, Meade County (north)
- Appleton Township, Clark County (northeast)
- Englewood Township, Clark County (east)
- Sand Creek Township, Meade County (south)
- Odee Township, Meade County (southwest)
- Meade Center Township, Meade County (west)

=== Major highways ===
- US-160
