= Meade County, Kansas =

County in Kansas, United States

- County
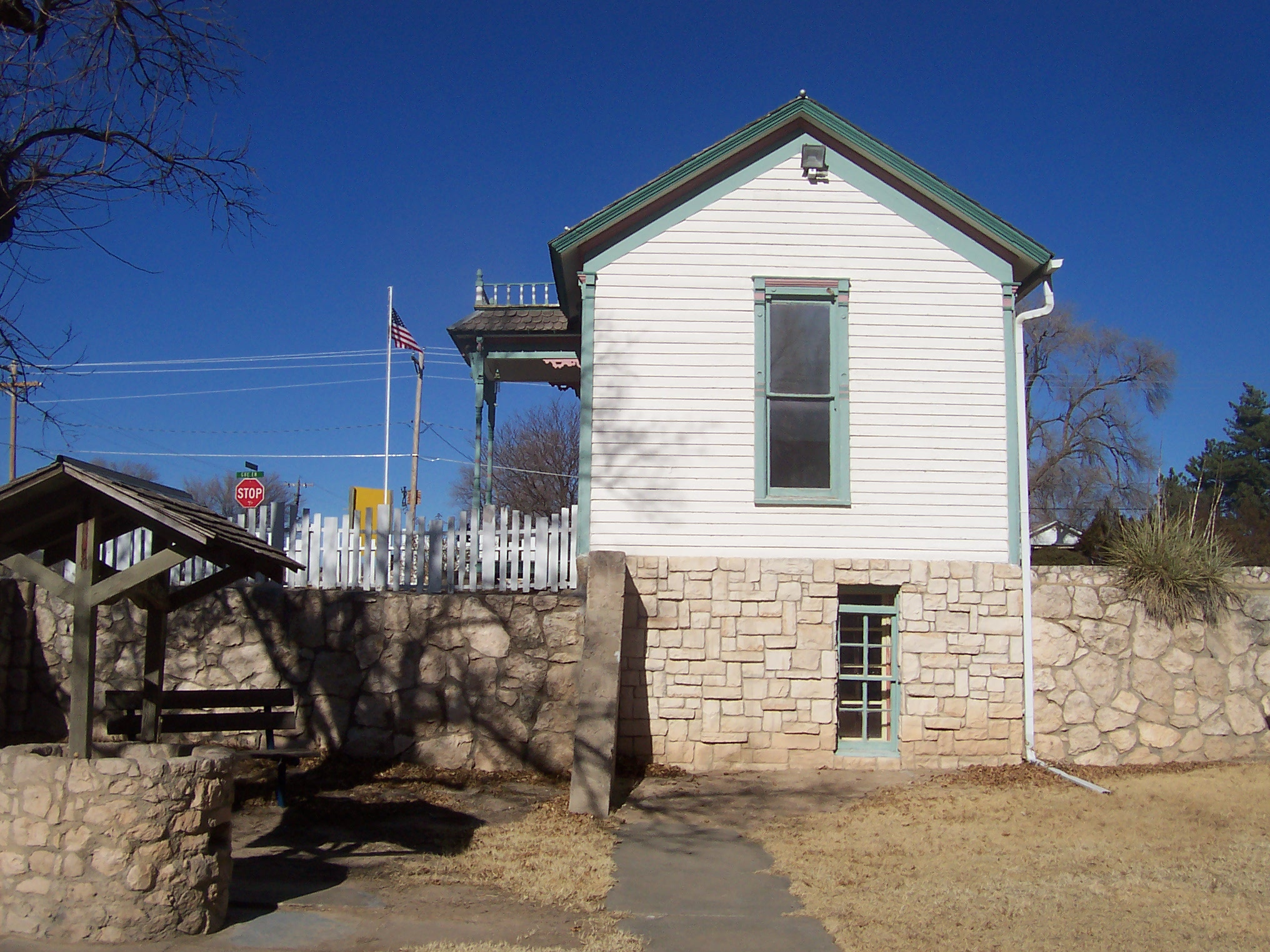
- Dalton Gang Hideout and Museum in Meade (2006)

- Location within the U.S. state of Kansas
- Coordinates: 37°14′N 100°22′W
- Country: United States
- State: Kansas
- Founded: March 20, 1873
- Named for: George G. Meade
- Seat: Meade
- Largest city: Meade

Area
  - Total: 979 sq mi (2,540 km^{2})
  - Land: 978 sq mi (2,530 km^{2})
  - Water: 1.3 sq mi (3.4 km^{2}) 0.1%

Population (2020)
  - Total: 4,055
  - Estimate (2025): 3,852 ▼
  - Density: 4.15/sq mi (1.60/km^{2})
- Time zone: UTC−6 (Central)
  - Summer (DST): UTC−5 (CDT)
- Area code: 620
- Congressional district: 1st
- Website: County website

Meade County is a county located in the U.S. state of Kansas. Its county seat and largest city is Meade. As of the 2020 census, the county population was 4,055. The county was created in 1873 and named in honor of George Meade, a Union general during the Civil War.

== History ==
For millennia, the Great Plains of North America were inhabited by nomadic Native Americans.

In 1854, the Kansas Territory was organized, then in 1861 Kansas became the 34th U.S. state.

In 1873, Meade County was established. The first permanent settlement in the county was established in 1878 at Meade City, 12 miles north of the city of Meade. Pearlette was settled shortly thereafter in 1879 by a company of sixteen families from Zanesville, Ohio led by John Jobling. The railroad first entered the country in 1887, ending a decade in which supplies had to be hauled from Dodge City.

On August 24, 1874, in Meade County, Mochi, Medicine Water, and the other members of their band of Cheyenne massacred a surveying party led by Capt. Oliver Francis Short, who had fought in the Union Army during the American Civil War. This event became known as the Lone Tree Massacre. Short, his 14-year-old son Truman, and four other members of the party were killed, with three of them being scalped.

Meade County became known as a hotbed of thievery and cattle rustling in the 1880s and 1890s. Eva Dalton Whipple lived with her husband in Meade County and allowed her house to be used as a hide for her brothers, the infamous Dalton Gang. The Dalton Gang Hideout and Museum was restored by the WPA in the 1930s and today is on the National Register of Historic Places.

A large sinkhole filled with saltwater, known as the Salt Well, appeared in the county on March 16, 1879. William Sturgis first produced commercial solar salt from the Salt Well in 1880, and floating in its salty water was a tourist attraction at the turn of the 20th century.

Like the rest of southwestern Kansas, Meade County was devastated by the Dust Bowl in the 1930s.

== Geography ==
According to the U.S. Census Bureau, the county has a total area of 979 square miles (2,540 km^{2}), of which 978 square miles (2,530 km^{2}) is land and 1.3 square miles (3.4 km^{2}) (0.1%) is water.

=== Adjacent counties ===
- Gray County (north)
- Ford County (northeast)
- Clark County (east)
- Beaver County, Oklahoma (south)
- Seward County (west)
- Haskell County (northwest)

== Demographics ==
Historical population
| Census | Pop. | Note | %± |
|---|---|---|---|
| 1880 | 296 | | — |
| 1890 | 2,542 | | 758.8% |
| 1900 | 1,581 | | −37.8% |
| 1910 | 5,055 | | 219.7% |
| 1920 | 5,542 | | 9.6% |
| 1930 | 6,858 | | 23.7% |
| 1940 | 5,522 | | −19.5% |
| 1950 | 5,710 | | 3.4% |
| 1960 | 5,505 | | −3.6% |
| 1970 | 4,912 | | −10.8% |
| 1980 | 4,788 | | −2.5% |
| 1990 | 4,247 | | −11.3% |
| 2000 | 4,631 | | 9.0% |
| 2010 | 4,575 | | −1.2% |
| 2020 | 4,055 | | −11.4% |
| 2025 (est.) | 3,852 | ▼ | −5.0% |
U.S. Decennial Census; 1790-1960 1900-1990; 1990-2000 2010-2020

=== 2020 census ===
As of the 2020 census, the county had a population of 4,055. The median age was 39.1 years. 26.4% of residents were under the age of 18 and 18.5% of residents were 65 years of age or older. For every 100 females there were 105.3 males, and for every 100 females age 18 and over there were 97.7 males age 18 and over. 0.0% of residents lived in urban areas, while 100.0% lived in rural areas.

The racial makeup of the county was 80.4% White, 0.9% Black or African American, 0.3% American Indian and Alaska Native, 0.3% Asian, 0.0% Native Hawaiian and Pacific Islander, 7.8% from some other race, and 10.2% from two or more races. Hispanic or Latino residents of any race comprised 19.7% of the population.

There were 1,584 households in the county, of which 32.2% had children under the age of 18 living with them and 21.2% had a female householder with no spouse or partner present. About 27.5% of all households were made up of individuals and 14.7% had someone living alone who was 65 years of age or older.

There were 1,900 housing units, of which 16.6% were vacant. Among occupied housing units, 71.7% were owner-occupied and 28.3% were renter-occupied. The homeowner vacancy rate was 2.7% and the rental vacancy rate was 14.4%.

=== 2000 census ===
As of the census of 2000, there were 4,631 people, 1,728 households, and 1,252 families residing in the county. The population density was 5 people per square mile (1.9 people/km^{2}). There were 1,968 housing units at an average density of 2 per square mile (0.77/km^{2}). The racial makeup of the county was 91.10% White, 0.39% Black or African American, 0.54% Native American, 0.22% Asian, 6.24% from other races, and 1.51% from two or more races. 10.90% of the population were Hispanic or Latino of any race.

There were 1,728 households, out of which 36.40% had children under the age of 18 living with them, 64.70% were married couples living together, 4.90% had a female householder with no husband present, and 27.50% were non-families. 25.60% of all households were made up of individuals, and 13.60% had someone living alone who was 65 years of age or older. The average household size was 2.61 and the average family size was 3.16.

In the county, the population was spread out, with 29.50% under the age of 18, 6.90% from 18 to 24, 26.50% from 25 to 44, 19.20% from 45 to 64, and 17.90% who were 65 years of age or older. The median age was 36 years. For every 100 females there were 98.20 males. For every 100 females age 18 and over, there were 95.00 males.

The median income for a household in the county was $36,761, and the median income for a family was $41,550. Males had a median income of $29,295 versus $20,153 for females. The per capita income for the county was $16,824. About 6.70% of families and 9.30% of the population were below the poverty line, including 11.90% of those under age 18 and 5.70% of those age 65 or over.

== Government ==
Meade County is usually carried by Republican candidates. The last time a Democratic presidential candidate carried the county was in 1936, when Franklin D. Roosevelt won a landslide victory nationwide.

=== Presidential elections ===
Presidential election results

United States presidential election results for Meade County, Kansas
| Year | Republican | | Democratic | | Third party(ies) | |
| Year | No. | % | No. | % | No. | % |
|---|---|---|---|---|---|---|
| 1888 | 578 | 56.78% | 342 | 33.60% | 98 | 9.63% |
| 1892 | 261 | 54.83% | 0 | 0.00% | 215 | 45.17% |
| 1896 | 203 | 50.50% | 195 | 48.51% | 4 | 1.00% |
| 1900 | 238 | 53.24% | 209 | 46.76% | 0 | 0.00% |
| 1904 | 383 | 66.38% | 166 | 28.77% | 28 | 4.85% |
| 1908 | 560 | 56.22% | 386 | 38.76% | 50 | 5.02% |
| 1912 | 204 | 18.26% | 383 | 34.29% | 530 | 47.45% |
| 1916 | 973 | 44.96% | 977 | 45.15% | 214 | 9.89% |
| 1920 | 1,236 | 70.95% | 483 | 27.73% | 23 | 1.32% |
| 1924 | 1,290 | 66.94% | 472 | 24.49% | 165 | 8.56% |
| 1928 | 1,709 | 73.16% | 618 | 26.46% | 9 | 0.39% |
| 1932 | 1,248 | 49.50% | 1,231 | 48.83% | 42 | 1.67% |
| 1936 | 1,218 | 46.58% | 1,394 | 53.31% | 3 | 0.11% |
| 1940 | 1,618 | 61.13% | 970 | 36.65% | 59 | 2.23% |
| 1944 | 1,424 | 68.23% | 631 | 30.23% | 32 | 1.53% |
| 1948 | 1,406 | 60.19% | 834 | 35.70% | 96 | 4.11% |
| 1952 | 2,061 | 76.90% | 568 | 21.19% | 51 | 1.90% |
| 1956 | 1,720 | 74.30% | 575 | 24.84% | 20 | 0.86% |
| 1960 | 1,826 | 70.47% | 754 | 29.10% | 11 | 0.42% |
| 1964 | 1,290 | 51.77% | 1,179 | 47.31% | 23 | 0.92% |
| 1968 | 1,511 | 66.24% | 572 | 25.08% | 198 | 8.68% |
| 1972 | 1,712 | 74.56% | 526 | 22.91% | 58 | 2.53% |
| 1976 | 1,109 | 51.53% | 983 | 45.68% | 60 | 2.79% |
| 1980 | 1,618 | 71.66% | 482 | 21.35% | 158 | 7.00% |
| 1984 | 1,804 | 77.16% | 491 | 21.00% | 43 | 1.84% |
| 1988 | 1,322 | 65.19% | 664 | 32.74% | 42 | 2.07% |
| 1992 | 1,135 | 52.45% | 430 | 19.87% | 599 | 27.68% |
| 1996 | 1,443 | 70.08% | 426 | 20.69% | 190 | 9.23% |
| 2000 | 1,604 | 78.13% | 400 | 19.48% | 49 | 2.39% |
| 2004 | 1,748 | 82.41% | 356 | 16.78% | 17 | 0.80% |
| 2008 | 1,540 | 79.75% | 357 | 18.49% | 34 | 1.76% |
| 2012 | 1,428 | 83.56% | 258 | 15.10% | 23 | 1.35% |
| 2016 | 1,415 | 82.27% | 210 | 12.21% | 95 | 5.52% |
| 2020 | 1,523 | 83.45% | 263 | 14.41% | 39 | 2.14% |
| 2024 | 1,427 | 84.19% | 247 | 14.57% | 21 | 1.24% |

=== Laws ===
The Kansas Constitution was amended in 1986 to allow the sale of alcoholic liquor by the individual drink with the approval of voters, either with or without a minimum of 30% of sales coming from food. Meade County is one of 67 counties in the state that allows for the sale of liquor by the drink with the minimum food sales stipulation.

== Education ==
=== Unified school districts ===
- Fowler USD 225
- Meade USD 226

== Communities ==
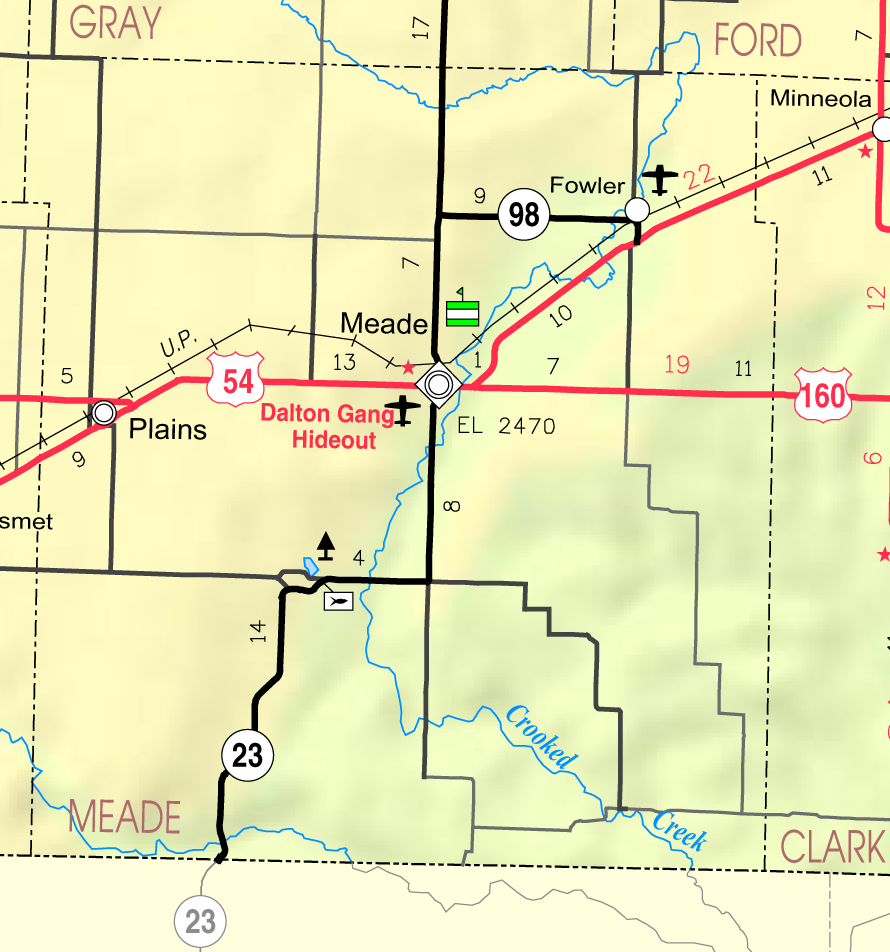
2005 map of Meade County (map legend)

List of townships / incorporated cities / unincorporated communities / extinct former communities within Meade County.

=== Cities ===
- Fowler
- Meade (county seat)
- Plains

=== Unincorporated community ===
- Missler

=== Townships ===
Meade County is divided into nine townships. None of the cities within the county are considered governmentally independent, and all figures for the townships include those of the cities. In the following table, the population center is the largest city (or cities) included in that township's population total, if it is of a significant size.

Sources: 2000 U.S. Gazetteer from the U.S. Census Bureau.
| Township | FIPS | Population center | Population | Population density /km^{2} (/sq mi) | Land area km^{2} (sq mi) | Water area km^{2} (sq mi) | Water % | Geographic coordinates |
|---|---|---|---|---|---|---|---|---|
| Cimarron | 13325 | | 93 | 0 (1) | 303 (117) | 2 (1) | 0.57% | 37°4′34″N 100°30′42″W |
| Crooked Creek | 16450 | | 92 | 1 (2) | 141 (54) | 0 (0) | 0.06% | 37°24′41″N 100°19′30″W |
| Fowler | 24200 | Fowler | 749 | 3 (7) | 271 (105) | 0 (0) | 0.01% | 37°23′8″N 100°11′46″W |
| Logan | 42000 | | 100 | 0 (1) | 284 (110) | 0 (0) | 0.01% | 37°14′30″N 100°11′58″W |
| Meade Center | 45350 | Meade | 1,968 | 7 (18) | 280 (108) | 0 (0) | 0.14% | 37°16′15″N 100°20′15″W |
| Mertilla | 46025 | | 221 | 1 (1) | 389 (150) | 0 (0) | 0.02% | 37°24′33″N 100°30′58″W |
| Odee | 52075 | | 50 | 0 (1) | 246 (95) | 0 (0) | 0.13% | 37°2′47″N 100°22′14″W |
| Sand Creek | 62925 | | 38 | 0 (0) | 272 (105) | 0 (0) | 0.03% | 37°3′59″N 100°9′46″W |
| West Plains | 77300 | Plains | 1,320 | 4 (10) | 348 (134) | 0 (0) | 0.13% | 37°14′59″N 100°33′45″W |

== See also ==
- Dry counties
- National Register of Historic Places listings in Meade County, Kansas

Community information for Kansas

- Kansas locations by per capita income
- List of counties in Kansas
- List of townships in Kansas
- List of cities in Kansas
- List of unincorporated communities in Kansas
- List of ghost towns in Kansas
