= 1936 United States presidential election in Kansas =

- November 3, 1936

Nominee	Franklin D. Roosevelt	Alf Landon
Party	Democratic	Republican
Home state	New York	Kansas
Running mate	John N. Garner	Frank Knox
Electoral vote	9	0
Popular vote	464,520	397,727
Percentage	53.67%	45.95%
County results
Roosevelt
40–50%
50–60%
60–70%
70–80%
Landon
40–50%
50–60%
60–70%
President before election
Franklin D. Roosevelt
Democratic
Elected President
Franklin D. Roosevelt
Democratic

The 1936 United States presidential election in Kansas took place on November 3, 1936, as part of 1936 United States presidential election held in all forty-eight contemporary states. Kansas voters chose nine electors, or representatives to the Electoral College, who voted for President and Vice President.

Kansas had been a powerfully Republican state during the 1920s (as it had been during its first quarter-century of statehood), although it did not possess the isolationist sentiment found in Appalachia or the Upper Midwest. In 1928 large-scale anti-Catholic voting swept a state substantially part of the Ozark “Bible Belt”, so that whereas Kansas had been less anti-Democratic than more northerly Plains states in 1920 and 1924, it became Herbert Hoover’s best state in the entire nation in 1928.

A major drought affected the Great Plains in the 1930s, producing dramatic swings against incumbent President Hoover in 1932, which were more overwhelming in Kansas than in states further north, though less so than in the traditionally Democratic Southern Plains that had been vehemently against Al Smith’s Catholic faith in 1928. During Franklin Delano Roosevelt's first term as President, Kansas twice elected Republican Governor Alfred Mossman Landon, who proved himself a skilled administrator, who was critical of the excesses of the Agricultural Adjustment Act and was the only GOP governor re-elected in 1934. Landon was to have relatively little trouble gaining the Republican nomination against the popular Roosevelt in 1936.

Although some observers thought that Landon could bring back the West and Plains which had completely deserted Herbert Hoover in 1932, Landon could not achieve this to any significant degree. Although he carried more than thirty counties that had supported Roosevelt in 1932, Landon did not make the hoped-for gains there, and any gains he did make were offset by substantial losses in Kansas’ larger cities, where Landon's later anti-New Deal rhetoric was unpopular. Landon consequently improved on Hoover's 1932 showing by only 1.71 percentage points even in a state that had known him as governor, although Kansas was Landon's fourth-best state by vote percentage behind Vermont, Maine and New Hampshire (the first two being the only states in the Union which Landon carried in the Electoral College). This was the penultimate time Kansas voted for a Democratic presidential candidate—the only subsequent Democrat to win the state being Lyndon B. Johnson in his national landslide win in 1964.

As of the 2024 presidential election, this is the last occasion the following counties have voted for a Democratic presidential candidate: Chase, Cheyenne, Decatur, Graham, Greenwood, Harper, Kiowa, Lincoln, Marion, Meade, Mitchell, Morris, (Note: Independent Ross Perot did tie Morris County with Republican George H. W. Bush in the 1992 election.) Rawlins, Rooks, Scott and Seward.

== Results ==
Electoral results
Presidential candidate	Party	Home state	Popular vote		Electoral vote	Running mate		
Presidential candidate	Party	Home state	Count	Percentage	Electoral vote	Vice-presidential candidate	Home state	Electoral vote
Franklin D. Roosevelt	Democratic	New York	464,520	53.67%	9	John Nance Garner	Texas	9
Alf Landon	Republican	Kansas	397,727	45.95%	0	Frank Knox	Illinois	0
Norman Thomas	Socialist	New York	2,763	0.32%	0	George A. Nelson	Wisconsin	0
William Lemke	Union	North Dakota	497	0.06%	0	Thomas C. O'Brien	Massachusetts	0
Total			865,507	100%	9			9
Needed to win					266			266

=== Results by county ===
1936 United States presidential election in Kansas by county
County	Franklin Delano Roosevelt Democratic		Alfred Mossman Landon Republican		Norman Mattoon Thomas Socialist		William Frederick Lemke Union		Margin		Total votes cast
County	#	%	#	%	#	%	#	%	#	%	Total votes cast
Allen	3,869	38.90%	6,071	61.05%	5	0.05%	0	0.00%	-2,202	-22.14%	9,945
Anderson	2,767	43.80%	3,452	54.64%	10	0.16%	89	1.41%	-685	-10.84%	6,318
Atchison	5,817	52.12%	5,312	47.60%	31	0.28%	0	0.00%	505	4.53%	11,160
Barber	2,774	60.20%	1,816	39.41%	18	0.39%	0	0.00%	958	20.79%	4,608
Barton	5,978	62.81%	3,534	37.13%	5	0.05%	0	0.00%	2,444	25.68%	9,517
Bourbon	5,714	51.38%	5,402	48.58%	4	0.04%	0	0.00%	312	2.81%	11,120
Brown	3,495	37.50%	5,814	62.38%	11	0.12%	0	0.00%	-2,319	-24.88%	9,320
Butler	9,283	59.84%	6,204	39.99%	27	0.17%	0	0.00%	3,079	19.85%	15,514
Chase	1,706	51.31%	1,610	48.42%	9	0.27%	0	0.00%	96	2.89%	3,325
Chautauqua	2,080	45.23%	2,506	54.49%	13	0.28%	0	0.00%	-426	-9.26%	4,599
Cherokee	7,894	58.88%	5,445	40.61%	69	0.51%	0	0.00%	2,449	18.27%	13,408
Cheyenne	1,673	57.20%	1,241	42.43%	11	0.38%	0	0.00%	432	14.77%	2,925
Clark	1,457	61.79%	899	38.13%	2	0.08%	0	0.00%	558	23.66%	2,358
Clay	3,441	49.25%	3,525	50.45%	21	0.30%	0	0.00%	-84	-1.20%	6,987
Cloud	4,546	51.75%	4,208	47.90%	21	0.24%	10	0.11%	338	3.85%	8,785
Coffey	2,662	40.47%	3,900	59.29%	16	0.24%	0	0.00%	-1,238	-18.82%	6,578
Comanche	1,428	60.43%	932	39.44%	3	0.13%	0	0.00%	496	20.99%	2,363
Cowley	10,805	56.12%	8,378	43.51%	72	0.37%	0	0.00%	2,427	12.60%	19,255
Crawford	12,974	59.96%	8,596	39.73%	66	0.31%	0	0.00%	4,378	20.23%	21,636
Decatur	2,362	57.55%	1,727	42.08%	7	0.17%	8	0.19%	635	15.47%	4,104
Dickinson	5,313	47.09%	5,936	52.61%	29	0.26%	5	0.04%	-623	-5.52%	11,283
Doniphan	2,749	41.91%	3,791	57.80%	19	0.29%	0	0.00%	-1,042	-15.89%	6,559
Douglas	4,961	37.08%	8,324	62.22%	94	0.70%	0	0.00%	-3,363	-25.14%	13,379
Edwards	1,986	58.71%	1,394	41.21%	3	0.09%	0	0.00%	592	17.50%	3,383
Elk	2,059	46.55%	2,355	53.24%	9	0.20%	0	0.00%	-296	-6.69%	4,423
Ellis	4,834	74.73%	1,622	25.07%	13	0.20%	0	0.00%	3,212	49.65%	6,469
Ellsworth	2,990	59.15%	2,058	40.71%	7	0.14%	0	0.00%	932	18.44%	5,055
Finney	2,682	58.85%	1,863	40.88%	12	0.26%	0	0.00%	819	17.97%	4,557
Ford	5,335	61.11%	3,378	38.69%	17	0.19%	0	0.00%	1,957	22.42%	8,730
Franklin	4,503	42.73%	6,007	57.00%	28	0.27%	0	0.00%	-1,504	-14.27%	10,538
Geary	2,973	55.39%	2,382	44.38%	12	0.22%	0	0.00%	591	11.01%	5,367
Gove	1,090	49.05%	1,107	49.82%	2	0.09%	23	1.04%	-17	-0.77%	2,222
Graham	1,734	54.15%	1,462	45.66%	6	0.19%	0	0.00%	272	8.49%	3,202
Grant	616	56.41%	476	43.59%	0	0.00%	0	0.00%	140	12.82%	1,092
Gray	1,459	65.57%	764	34.34%	2	0.09%	0	0.00%	695	31.24%	2,225
Greeley	388	49.43%	396	50.45%	1	0.13%	0	0.00%	-8	-1.02%	785
Greenwood	4,176	50.04%	4,146	49.68%	23	0.28%	0	0.00%	30	0.36%	8,345
Hamilton	885	54.76%	720	44.55%	11	0.68%	0	0.00%	165	10.21%	1,616
Harper	3,391	57.93%	2,441	41.70%	22	0.38%	0	0.00%	950	16.23%	5,854
Harvey	5,357	54.44%	4,456	45.28%	28	0.28%	0	0.00%	901	9.16%	9,841
Haskell	626	58.56%	442	41.35%	1	0.09%	0	0.00%	184	17.21%	1,069
Hodgeman	1,162	59.71%	781	40.13%	3	0.15%	0	0.00%	381	19.58%	1,946
Jackson	3,265	46.92%	3,680	52.88%	14	0.20%	0	0.00%	-415	-5.96%	6,959
Jefferson	3,105	45.39%	3,711	54.25%	25	0.37%	0	0.00%	-606	-8.86%	6,841
Jewell	2,780	41.72%	3,849	57.76%	35	0.53%	0	0.00%	-1,069	-16.04%	6,664
Johnson	6,108	41.97%	8,399	57.71%	37	0.25%	10	0.07%	-2,291	-15.74%	14,554
Kearny	716	54.53%	586	44.63%	11	0.84%	0	0.00%	130	9.90%	1,313
Kingman	3,705	64.64%	2,014	35.14%	10	0.17%	3	0.05%	1,691	29.50%	5,732
Kiowa	1,417	52.38%	1,280	47.32%	8	0.30%	0	0.00%	137	5.06%	2,705
Labette	8,050	54.70%	6,610	44.92%	56	0.38%	0	0.00%	1,440	9.79%	14,716
Lane	853	54.75%	682	43.77%	23	1.48%	0	0.00%	171	10.98%	1,558
Leavenworth	7,996	48.17%	8,532	51.39%	73	0.44%	0	0.00%	-536	-3.23%	16,601
Lincoln	2,209	52.35%	2,001	47.42%	10	0.24%	0	0.00%	208	4.93%	4,220
Linn	2,682	40.72%	3,872	58.78%	26	0.39%	7	0.11%	-1,190	-18.07%	6,587
Logan	908	48.63%	955	51.15%	4	0.21%	0	0.00%	-47	-2.52%	1,867
Lyon	7,340	54.68%	6,005	44.74%	59	0.44%	19	0.14%	1,335	9.95%	13,423
Marion	4,207	49.93%	4,185	49.67%	34	0.40%	0	0.00%	22	0.26%	8,426
Marshall	5,238	46.81%	5,929	52.98%	1	0.01%	22	0.20%	-691	-6.18%	11,190
McPherson	6,256	56.65%	4,744	42.96%	44	0.40%	0	0.00%	1,512	13.69%	11,044
Meade	1,394	53.31%	1,218	46.58%	3	0.11%	0	0.00%	176	6.73%	2,615
Miami	4,601	49.52%	4,676	50.33%	14	0.15%	0	0.00%	-75	-0.81%	9,291
Mitchell	3,289	53.82%	2,781	45.51%	41	0.67%	0	0.00%	508	8.31%	6,111
Montgomery	11,535	49.79%	11,565	49.92%	67	0.29%	0	0.00%	-30	-0.13%	23,167
Morris	2,805	50.31%	2,751	49.35%	17	0.30%	2	0.04%	54	0.97%	5,575
Morton	876	57.59%	636	41.81%	9	0.59%	0	0.00%	240	15.78%	1,521
Nemaha	4,175	51.09%	3,903	47.76%	10	0.12%	84	1.03%	272	3.33%	8,172
Neosho	5,611	49.10%	5,777	50.55%	40	0.35%	0	0.00%	-166	-1.45%	11,428
Ness	2,002	60.26%	1,302	39.19%	18	0.54%	0	0.00%	700	21.07%	3,322
Norton	2,307	44.71%	2,829	54.83%	24	0.47%	0	0.00%	-522	-10.12%	5,160
Osage	4,224	49.78%	4,232	49.87%	30	0.35%	0	0.00%	-8	-0.09%	8,486
Osborne	2,200	44.19%	2,765	55.54%	13	0.26%	0	0.00%	-565	-11.35%	4,978
Ottawa	2,785	55.33%	2,230	44.31%	18	0.36%	0	0.00%	555	11.03%	5,033
Pawnee	2,814	61.49%	1,753	38.31%	9	0.20%	0	0.00%	1,061	23.19%	4,576
Phillips	2,154	40.20%	3,193	59.59%	11	0.21%	0	0.00%	-1,039	-19.39%	5,358
Pottawatomie	3,284	44.39%	3,977	53.76%	13	0.18%	124	1.68%	-693	-9.37%	7,398
Pratt	3,871	66.43%	1,946	33.40%	10	0.17%	0	0.00%	1,925	33.04%	5,827
Rawlins	2,029	59.61%	1,364	40.07%	11	0.32%	0	0.00%	665	19.54%	3,404
Reno	14,203	62.03%	8,607	37.59%	86	0.38%	0	0.00%	5,596	24.44%	22,896
Republic	3,427	47.07%	3,830	52.61%	15	0.21%	8	0.11%	-403	-5.54%	7,280
Rice	4,905	59.49%	3,318	40.24%	22	0.27%	0	0.00%	1,587	19.25%	8,245
Riley	4,104	39.93%	6,077	59.13%	66	0.64%	31	0.30%	-1,973	-19.20%	10,278
Rooks	2,235	50.97%	2,150	49.03%	0	0.00%	0	0.00%	85	1.94%	4,385
Rush	2,482	58.83%	1,733	41.08%	4	0.09%	0	0.00%	749	17.75%	4,219
Russell	3,736	62.43%	2,241	37.45%	7	0.12%	0	0.00%	1,495	24.98%	5,984
Saline	7,872	56.30%	6,061	43.35%	50	0.36%	0	0.00%	1,811	12.95%	13,983
Scott	1,096	63.57%	625	36.25%	3	0.17%	0	0.00%	471	27.32%	1,724
Sedgwick	39,503	64.39%	21,654	35.29%	196	0.32%	0	0.00%	17,849	29.09%	61,353
Seward	1,997	64.23%	1,108	35.64%	4	0.13%	0	0.00%	889	28.59%	3,109
Shawnee	22,942	53.49%	19,785	46.13%	160	0.37%	1	0.00%	3,157	7.36%	42,888
Sheridan	1,442	57.66%	1,007	40.26%	7	0.28%	45	1.80%	435	17.39%	2,501
Sherman	1,814	59.89%	1,159	38.26%	56	1.85%	0	0.00%	655	21.62%	3,029
Smith	2,847	46.25%	3,292	53.48%	17	0.28%	0	0.00%	-445	-7.23%	6,156
Stafford	3,212	62.12%	1,939	37.50%	20	0.39%	0	0.00%	1,273	24.62%	5,171
Stanton	458	59.48%	311	40.39%	1	0.13%	0	0.00%	147	19.09%	770
Stevens	1,023	59.13%	701	40.52%	6	0.35%	0	0.00%	322	18.61%	1,730
Sumner	7,966	61.57%	4,946	38.23%	26	0.20%	1	0.01%	3,020	23.34%	12,939
Thomas	2,168	63.99%	1,200	35.42%	16	0.47%	4	0.12%	968	28.57%	3,388
Trego	1,783	63.43%	1,012	36.00%	16	0.57%	0	0.00%	771	27.43%	2,811
Wabaunsee	2,235	44.18%	2,809	55.52%	15	0.30%	0	0.00%	-574	-11.35%	5,059
Wallace	492	42.38%	658	56.68%	11	0.95%	0	0.00%	-166	-14.30%	1,161
Washington	3,355	40.95%	4,809	58.70%	28	0.34%	0	0.00%	-1,454	-17.75%	8,192
Wichita	637	58.39%	448	41.06%	5	0.46%	1	0.09%	189	17.32%	1,091
Wilson	3,816	43.93%	4,829	55.59%	42	0.48%	0	0.00%	-1,013	-11.66%	8,687
Woodson	1,884	44.05%	2,374	55.51%	19	0.44%	0	0.00%	-490	-11.46%	4,277
Wyandotte	38,101	58.98%	26,239	40.62%	256	0.40%	0	0.00%	11,862	18.36%	64,596
Totals	464,520	53.67%	397,727	45.95%	2,763 (Note: The Thomas total include 18 absentee votes that were not assigned to any county.)	0.32%	497	0.06%	66,793	7.72%	865,507

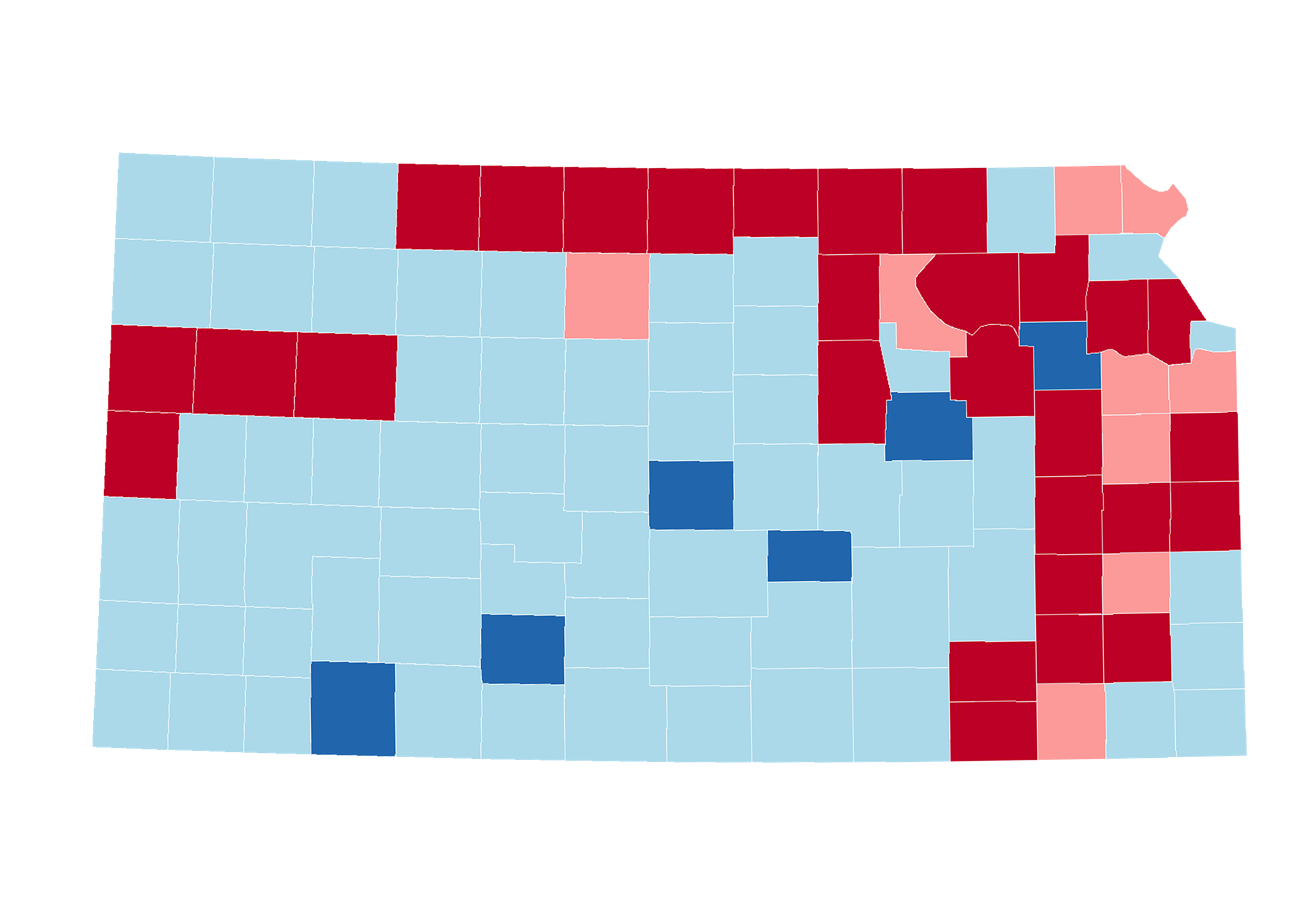
Kansas county flips 1932-36: Democratic Hold Gain from Republican Republican Hold Gain from Democratic

==== Counties that flipped from Democratic to Republican ====
- Jefferson
- Greeley
- Jewell
- Wabaunsee
- Logan
- Washington
- Wallace
- Smith
- Phillips
- Clay
- Dickinson
- Marshall
- Leavenworth
- Jackson
- Osage
- Miami
- Norton
- Linn
- Woodson
- Wilson
- Neosho
- Gove
- Coffey
- Chautauqua
- Anderson
- Elk
- Pottawatomie
- Republic

==== Counties that flipped from Republican to Democratic ====
- Kiowa
- Harvey
- Morris
- Meade
- Rice
- Shawnee

== See also ==
- United States presidential elections in Kansas
