= Ingalls Township, Kansas =

Ingalls Township
- Township
- Location in Gray County
- Coordinates: 37°46′50″N 100°32′34″W
- Country: United States
- State: Kansas
- County: Gray

Area
  - Total: 134.71 sq mi (348.91 km^{2})
  - Land: 134.7 sq mi (348.8 km^{2})
  - Water: 0.042 sq mi (0.11 km^{2}) 0.03%
- Elevation: 2,760 ft (840 m)

Population (2020)
  - Total: 564
  - Density: 4.19/sq mi (1.62/km^{2})
- GNIS feature ID: 0471648

Ingalls Township is a township in Gray County, Kansas, United States. As of the 2020 census, its population was 564.

== Geography ==
Ingalls Township covers an area of 134.72 square miles (348.9 km^{2}) and contains one incorporated settlement, Ingalls. According to the USGS, it contains one cemetery, Ingalls-Logan.
