= Meade Center Township, Kansas =

Township in Meade County, Kansas, U.S.

Meade Center Township
- Township
- Location within Meade County
- Coordinates: 37.243886°N 100.360094°W
- Country: United States
- State: Kansas
- County: Meade

Area
  - Total: 108.107 sq mi (280.00 km^{2})
  - Land: 107.96 sq mi (279.6 km^{2})
  - Water: 0.147 sq mi (0.38 km^{2}) 0.14%

Population (2020)
  - Total: 1,737
  - Density: 16.09/sq mi (6.212/km^{2})
- Time zone: UTC-6 (CST)
  - Summer (DST): UTC-5 (CDT)
- Area code: 620

Meade Center Township is a township in Meade County, Kansas, United States. As of the 2020 census, its population was 1,737.

== Geography ==
Meade Center Township covers an area of 108.107 square miles (280.00 square kilometers). Part of Meade State Park is located within the township.

=== Communities ===
- Meade

=== Adjacent townships ===
- Crooked Creek Township, Meade County (north)
- Fowler Township, Meade County (northeast)
- Logan Township, Meade County (east)
- Sand Creek Township, Meade County (southeast)
- Odee Township, Meade County (south)
- Cimarron Township, Meade County (southwest)
- West Plains Township, Meade County (west)
- Mertilla Township, Meade County (northwest)

=== Major highways ===
- US-54
- US-160
- K-23
