= Odee Township, Kansas =

Township in Meade County, Kansas, U.S.

Odee Township
- Township
- Location within Meade County
- Coordinates: 37.10°N 100.36°W
- Country: United States
- State: Kansas
- County: Meade

Area
  - Total: 95.106 sq mi (246.32 km^{2})
  - Land: 94.98 sq mi (246.0 km^{2})
  - Water: 0.126 sq mi (0.33 km^{2}) 0.13%

Population (2020)
  - Total: 51
  - Density: 0.54/sq mi (0.21/km^{2})
- Time zone: UTC-6 (CST)
  - Summer (DST): UTC-5 (CDT)
- Area code: 620

Odee Township is a township in Meade County, Kansas, United States.

== History ==
Odee was named for Orren Dick "O. D." Lemert, who was instrumental in securing a post office. This post office was discontinued in 1908.

== Geography ==
Odee Township covers an area of 95.106 square miles (246.32 square kilometers). The Cimarron River flows through it.

=== Adjacent townships ===
- Meade Center Township, Meade County (north)
- Logan Township, Meade County (northeast)
- Sand Creek Township, Meade County (east)
- Cimarron Township, Meade County (west)
- West Plains Township, Meade County (northwest)
