= Alfred Gray (Kansas politician) =

American politician

Secretary of the Kansas Department of Agriculture
- In office 1873–1880
- Governor: Thomas A. Osborn; George T. Anthony; John St. John
- Succeeded by: Joseph K. Hudson

Personal details
- Born: December 5, 1830 Evans, New York, US
- Died: January 24, 1880 (aged 49)
- Education: Albany Law School

Military service
- Allegiance: Union
- Branch/service: Army

Alfred Gray (December 5, 1830 – January 23, 1880) was an American politician from Kansas. He served as a state legislator and as Secretary of the state Board of Agriculture.

Gray was born to English parents in Evans, New York. His father died when he was 14, after which he worked to support his mother; after his mother died when he was 19, he enrolled in law school. He attended Albany Law School, earning a degree in 1855, and then entering law practice.

In 1857, however, he moved to Quindaro, Kansas, and took up farming. He was soon elected to the Kansas Legislature and served for a time. During the Civil War he served in the Union Army, and returning to Kansas politics, held a series of high-profile agricultural posts. He was a director in the Kansas State Agricultural Society from 1866 until it was merged into the Kansas State Board of Agriculture. He later sold his farm and moved to Topeka to serve as Secretary of the Board of Agriculture from 1873 until his death from tuberculosis in 1880.

Gray County, Kansas is named after him.
