= Sand Creek Township, Kansas =

Township in Meade County, Kansas, U.S.

Sand Creek Township
- Township
- Location within Meade County
- Coordinates: 37.067775°N 100.184896°W
- Country: United States
- State: Kansas
- County: Meade

Area
  - Total: 105.135 sq mi (272.30 km^{2})
  - Land: 105.103 sq mi (272.22 km^{2})
  - Water: 0.032 sq mi (0.083 km^{2}) 0.03%

Population (2020)
  - Total: 26
  - Density: 0.25/sq mi (0.096/km^{2})
- Time zone: UTC-6 (CST)
  - Summer (DST): UTC-5 (CDT)
- Area code: 620

Sand Creek Township is a township in Meade County, Kansas, United States. As of the 2020 census, its population was 26.

== Geography ==
Sand Creek Township covers an area of 105.135 square miles (272.30 square kilometers).

=== Adjacent townships ===
- Logan Township, Meade County (north)
- Englewood Township, Clark County (east)
- Odee Township, Meade County (west)
- Meade Center Township, Meade County (northwest)
