= Logan Township, Gray County, Kansas =

Logan Township
- Township
- Location in Gray County
- Coordinates: 37°54′53″N 100°33′20″W
- Country: United States
- State: Kansas
- County: Gray

Area
  - Total: 119.4 sq mi (309.2 km^{2})
  - Land: 119.33 sq mi (309.07 km^{2})
  - Water: 0.050 sq mi (0.13 km^{2}) 0.04%
- Elevation: 2,835 ft (864 m)

Population (2020)
  - Total: 163
  - Density: 1.37/sq mi (0.527/km^{2})
- GNIS feature ID: 0485283

Logan Township is a township in Gray County, Kansas, United States. As of the 2020 census, its population was 163.

== Geography ==
Logan Township covers an area of 119.38 square miles (309.2 km^{2}) and contains no incorporated settlements.

== Transportation ==
Logan Township contains one airport or landing strip, Ingalls Municipal Airport.
