= Copeland Township, Kansas =

Copeland Township
- Township
- Location in Gray County
- Coordinates: 37°35′00″N 100°36′17″W
- Country: United States
- State: Kansas
- County: Gray

Area
  - Total: 90.26 sq mi (233.77 km^{2})
  - Land: 90.12 sq mi (233.42 km^{2})
  - Water: 0.14 sq mi (0.35 km^{2}) 0.15%
- Elevation: 2,740 ft (835 m)

Population (2020)
  - Total: 502
  - Density: 5.57/sq mi (2.15/km^{2})
- GNIS feature ID: 0470620

Copeland Township is a township in Gray County, Kansas, United States. As of the 2020 census, its population was 502.

== Geography ==
Copeland Township covers an area of 90.26 square miles (233.8 km^{2}) and contains one incorporated settlement, Copeland.
