= Foote Township, Kansas =

Foote Township
- Township
- Location in Gray County
- Coordinates: 37°57′28″N 100°20′13″W
- Country: United States
- State: Kansas
- County: Gray

Area
  - Total: 119.68 sq mi (309.96 km^{2})
  - Land: 119.66 sq mi (309.91 km^{2})
  - Water: 0.019 sq mi (0.05 km^{2}) 0.02%
- Elevation: 2,707 ft (825 m)

Population (2020)
  - Total: 131
  - Density: 1.09/sq mi (0.423/km^{2})
- GNIS feature ID: 0471627

Foote Township is a township in Gray County, Kansas, United States. As of the 2020 census, its population was 131.

== Geography ==
Foote Township covers an area of 119.68 square miles (310.0 km^{2}) and contains no incorporated settlements.
