= Haggard, Kansas =

Unincorporated community in Gray County, Kansas

Coordinates: 37°38′04″N 100°19′14″W

Haggard is an unincorporated community in Gray County, Kansas, United States.

== History ==
A post office was opened in Haggard in 1914, and remained in operation until 1954.

== Economy ==
The Gray County Wind Farm near Haggard is the largest wind farm in Kansas.
