= West Plains Township, Kansas =

Township in Meade County, Kansas, U.S.

West Plains Township
- Township
- Location within Meade County
- Coordinates: 37.251443°N 100.535517°W
- Country: United States
- State: Kansas
- County: Meade

Area
  - Total: 134.403 sq mi (348.10 km^{2})
  - Land: 134.224 sq mi (347.64 km^{2})
  - Water: 0.179 sq mi (0.46 km^{2}) 0.13%

Population (2020)
  - Total: 1,177
  - Density: 8.769/sq mi (3.386/km^{2})
- Time zone: UTC-6 (CST)
  - Summer (DST): UTC-5 (CDT)
- Area code: 620

West Plains Township is a township in Meade County, Kansas, United States. As of the 2020 census, its population was 1,177.

== Geography ==
West Plains Township covers an area of 134.403 square miles (348.10 square kilometers). Most of Meade State Park is located within the township.

=== Communities ===
- Plains

=== Adjacent townships ===
- Mertilla Township, Meade County (north)
- Meade Center Township, Meade County (east)
- Odee Township, Meade County (southeast)
- Cimarron Township, Meade County (south)
- Fargo Township, Seward County (southwest)
- Seward Township, Seward County (northwest)

=== Major highways ===
- US-54
- US-160
- K-23
