= Cimarron Township, Meade County, Kansas =

Township in Meade County, Kansas, U.S.

Cimarron Township
- Township
- Location within Meade County
- Coordinates: 37.09055°N 100.527636°W
- Country: United States
- State: Kansas
- County: Meade

Area
  - Total: 117.618 sq mi (304.63 km^{2})
  - Land: 116.922 sq mi (302.83 km^{2})
  - Water: 0.696 sq mi (1.80 km^{2}) 0.59%

Population (2020)
  - Total: 67
  - Density: 0.57/sq mi (0.22/km^{2})
- Time zone: UTC-6 (CST)
  - Summer (DST): UTC-5 (CDT)
- Area code: 620

Cimarron Township is a township in Meade County, Kansas, United States. As of the 2020 census, its population was 67.

== Geography ==
Cimarron Township covers an area of 117.618 square miles (304.63 square kilometers). The Cimarron River flows through it.

=== Adjacent townships ===
- West Plains Township, Meade County (north)
- Meade Center Township, Meade County (northeast)
- Odee Township, Meade County (east)
- Fargo Township, Seward County (west)

=== Major highways ===
- K-23
