= 1976 United States presidential election in Kansas =

- November 2, 1976

Nominee	Gerald Ford	Jimmy Carter
Party	Republican	Democratic
Home state	Michigan	Georgia
Running mate	Bob Dole	Walter Mondale
Electoral vote	7	0
Popular vote	502,752	430,421
Percentage	52.49%	44.94%
County results
Ford
40–50%
50–60%
60–70%
Carter
40–50%
50–60%
President before election
Gerald Ford
Republican
Elected President
Jimmy Carter
Democratic

The 1976 United States presidential election in Kansas took place on November 2, 1976, as part of the 1976 United States presidential election. Kansas voters chose seven representatives, or electors, to the Electoral College, who voted for president and vice president.

Kansas was won by incumbent President Gerald Ford (R–Michigan). with 52.49 percent of the popular vote, against Jimmy Carter (D–Georgia), with 44.94 percent of the popular vote. None of the third-party candidates amounted to a significant portion of the vote, but Eugene McCarthy (I–Minnesota) won 1.38 percent of the popular vote in Kansas, finishing third in the state. This was the only occasion between 1964 and 1988 that the Democrats won any Kansas county except Wyandotte.

Ford's running mate was Bob Dole, Kansas' junior U.S. senator since 1969. Dole, a native of Russell, was previously the U.S. representative from Kansas's 1st congressional district from 1963 to 1968 after representing the defunct 6th district for one term.

Despite losing in Kansas, Carter went on to win the national election and became the 39th president of the United States. As of the 2024 presidential election, this is the last election in which the following counties have voted for a Democratic presidential candidate: Anderson, Butler, Cloud, Edwards, Finney, Ford, Gray, Greeley, Hamilton, Hodgeman, Kingman, Ness, Pawnee, Reno, Rice, Rush, Stafford, Sumner, and Wichita.

== Results ==
1976 United States presidential election in Kansas
Party	Candidate	Votes	%
Republican	Gerald Ford (inc.)	502,752	52.49%
Democratic	Jimmy Carter	430,421	44.94%
Independent	Eugene McCarthy	13,185	1.38%
American	Thomas Anderson	4,724	0.49%
Libertarian	Roger MacBride	3,242	0.34%
Conservative	Lester Maddox	2,118	0.22%
Prohibition	Benjamin Bubar	1,403	0.15%
Total votes		957,845	100.00%

=== Results by county ===
County	Gerald Ford Republican		Jimmy Carter Democratic		Eugene McCarthy Independent		Thomas Anderson American		Various candidates Other parties		Margin		Total votes cast
County	#	%	#	%	#	%	#	%	#	%	#	%	Total votes cast
Allen	3,269	53.23%	2,746	44.72%	67	1.09%	25	0.41%	34	0.55%	523	8.51%	6,141
Anderson	1,872	48.70%	1,886	49.06%	51	1.33%	17	0.44%	18	0.47%	-14	-0.36%	3,844
Atchison	4,030	48.30%	4,108	49.23%	142	1.70%	35	0.42%	29	0.35%	-78	-0.93%	8,344
Barber	1,568	50.43%	1,494	48.05%	27	0.87%	8	0.26%	12	0.39%	74	2.38%	3,109
Barton	7,311	55.63%	5,497	41.83%	174	1.32%	84	0.64%	76	0.58%	1,814	13.80%	13,142
Bourbon	3,589	51.80%	3,237	46.72%	44	0.64%	28	0.40%	31	0.45%	352	5.08%	6,929
Brown	3,407	64.96%	1,745	33.27%	51	0.97%	17	0.32%	25	0.48%	1,662	31.69%	5,245
Butler	8,390	48.45%	8,540	49.32%	173	1.00%	107	0.62%	106	0.61%	-150	-0.87%	17,316
Chase	922	57.59%	643	40.16%	18	1.12%	10	0.62%	8	0.50%	279	17.43%	1,601
Chautauqua	1,159	55.77%	866	41.67%	27	1.30%	17	0.82%	9	0.43%	293	14.10%	2,078
Cherokee	3,957	42.93%	5,154	55.91%	55	0.60%	18	0.20%	34	0.37%	-1,197	-12.98%	9,218
Cheyenne	1,008	55.84%	758	41.99%	19	1.05%	10	0.55%	10	0.55%	250	13.85%	1,805
Clark	761	51.80%	680	46.29%	13	0.88%	9	0.61%	6	0.41%	81	5.51%	1,469
Clay	3,085	63.85%	1,610	33.32%	57	1.18%	20	0.41%	60	1.24%	1,475	30.53%	4,832
Cloud	2,954	48.74%	2,976	49.10%	55	0.91%	18	0.30%	58	0.96%	-22	-0.36%	6,061
Coffey	2,145	56.70%	1,549	40.95%	48	1.27%	23	0.61%	18	0.48%	596	15.75%	3,783
Comanche	719	52.71%	630	46.19%	8	0.59%	1	0.07%	6	0.44%	89	6.52%	1,364
Cowley	7,513	50.32%	7,095	47.52%	152	1.02%	76	0.51%	95	0.64%	418	2.80%	14,931
Crawford	7,225	43.78%	9,021	54.66%	133	0.81%	37	0.22%	88	0.53%	-1,796	-10.88%	16,504
Decatur	1,232	52.74%	1,011	43.28%	36	1.54%	32	1.37%	25	1.07%	221	9.46%	2,336
Dickinson	4,759	55.23%	3,672	42.61%	103	1.20%	38	0.44%	45	0.52%	1,087	12.62%	8,617
Doniphan	2,469	62.21%	1,428	35.98%	29	0.73%	12	0.30%	31	0.78%	1,041	26.23%	3,969
Douglas	14,277	51.28%	11,922	42.82%	1,358	4.88%	115	0.41%	170	0.61%	2,355	8.46%	27,842
Edwards	1,001	42.47%	1,304	55.32%	26	1.25%	9	0.43%	17	0.81%	-303	-12.85%	2,357
Elk	1,087	54.84%	865	43.64%	12	0.61%	6	0.30%	12	0.61%	222	11.20%	1,982
Ellis	4,719	41.98%	6,280	55.87%	157	1.40%	38	0.34%	46	0.41%	-1,561	-13.89%	11,240
Ellsworth	1,618	49.85%	1,573	48.46%	28	0.86%	14	0.43%	13	0.40%	45	1.39%	3,246
Finney	3,711	48.40%	3,813	49.73%	68	0.89%	37	0.48%	38	0.50%	-102	-1.33%	7,667
Ford	4,679	47.61%	4,934	50.21%	114	1.16%	29	0.30%	71	0.72%	-255	-2.60%	9,827
Franklin	4,760	55.49%	3,607	42.05%	120	1.40%	33	0.38%	58	0.68%	1,153	13.44%	8,578
Geary	3,230	52.13%	2,843	45.88%	61	0.98%	15	0.24%	47	0.76%	387	6.25%	6,196
Gove	860	48.95%	848	48.26%	33	1.88%	4	0.23%	12	0.68%	12	0.69%	1,757
Graham	1,112	53.26%	936	44.83%	22	1.05%	4	0.19%	14	0.67%	176	8.43%	2,088
Grant	1,226	50.62%	1,151	47.52%	21	0.87%	7	0.29%	17	0.70%	75	3.10%	2,422
Gray	837	42.08%	1,111	55.86%	23	1.16%	5	0.25%	13	0.65%	-274	-13.78%	1,989
Greeley	389	43.42%	479	53.46%	14	1.56%	5	0.56%	9	1.00%	-90	-10.04%	896
Greenwood	2,319	55.96%	1,737	41.92%	23	0.56%	44	1.06%	21	0.51%	582	14.04%	4,144
Hamilton	560	41.70%	746	55.55%	8	0.60%	20	1.49%	9	0.67%	-186	-13.85%	1,343
Harper	1,777	50.00%	1,681	47.30%	29	0.82%	35	0.98%	32	0.90%	96	2.70%	3,554
Harvey	6,624	51.00%	6,003	46.22%	173	1.33%	92	0.71%	95	0.73%	621	4.78%	12,987
Haskell	761	51.98%	676	46.17%	13	0.89%	4	0.27%	10	0.68%	85	5.81%	1,464
Hodgeman	576	43.80%	697	53.00%	24	1.83%	7	0.53%	11	0.84%	-121	-9.20%	1,315
Jackson	2,725	54.85%	2,129	42.85%	48	0.97%	30	0.60%	36	0.72%	596	12.00%	4,968
Jefferson	3,225	55.12%	2,470	42.22%	84	1.44%	40	0.68%	32	0.55%	755	12.90%	5,851
Jewell	1,592	57.47%	1,111	40.11%	29	1.05%	11	0.40%	27	0.97%	481	17.36%	2,770
Johnson	75,798	66.41%	35,605	31.19%	1,740	1.52%	364	0.32%	635	0.56%	40,193	35.22%	114,142
Kearny	674	48.95%	658	47.79%	22	1.60%	10	0.73%	13	0.94%	16	1.16%	1,377
Kingman	1,839	44.93%	2,142	52.33%	69	1.69%	16	0.39%	27	0.66%	-303	-7.40%	4,093
Kiowa	1,180	59.48%	764	38.51%	19	0.96%	6	0.30%	15	0.76%	416	20.97%	1,984
Labette	4,640	45.59%	5,294	52.02%	127	1.25%	59	0.58%	57	0.56%	-654	-6.43%	10,177
Lane	651	48.91%	646	48.53%	12	0.90%	8	0.60%	14	1.05%	5	0.38%	1,331
Leavenworth	8,407	50.11%	8,022	47.81%	212	1.26%	70	0.42%	67	0.40%	385	2.30%	16,778
Lincoln	1,225	54.52%	985	43.84%	23	1.02%	3	0.13%	11	0.49%	240	10.68%	2,247
Linn	1,873	52.00%	1,681	46.67%	23	0.64%	7	0.19%	18	0.50%	192	5.33%	3,602
Logan	957	56.39%	694	40.90%	15	0.88%	20	1.18%	11	0.65%	263	15.49%	1,697
Lyon	7,062	52.59%	5,634	41.96%	232	1.73%	446	3.32%	54	0.40%	1,428	10.63%	13,428
Marion	3,226	50.72%	3,004	47.23%	71	1.12%	16	0.25%	43	0.68%	222	3.49%	6,360
Marshall	6,187	52.17%	5,366	45.24%	158	1.33%	44	0.37%	105	0.89%	821	6.93%	11,860
McPherson	3,519	57.31%	2,483	40.44%	63	1.03%	31	0.50%	44	0.72%	1,036	16.87%	6,140
Meade	1,109	51.53%	983	45.68%	20	0.93%	10	0.46%	30	1.39%	126	5.85%	2,152
Miami	3,999	48.67%	4,000	48.69%	125	1.52%	45	0.55%	47	0.57%	-1	-0.02%	8,216
Mitchell	2,095	53.99%	1,700	43.81%	51	1.31%	14	0.36%	20	0.52%	395	10.18%	3,880
Montgomery	8,864	54.08%	7,157	43.66%	122	0.74%	161	0.98%	87	0.53%	1,707	10.42%	16,391
Morris	1,698	54.74%	1,337	43.10%	32	1.03%	15	0.48%	20	0.64%	361	11.64%	3,102
Morton	738	48.91%	735	48.71%	20	1.33%	5	0.33%	11	0.73%	3	0.20%	1,509
Nemaha	2,759	50.71%	2,586	47.53%	63	1.16%	13	0.24%	20	0.37%	173	3.18%	5,441
Neosho	4,038	50.32%	3,842	47.88%	79	0.98%	38	0.47%	27	0.34%	196	2.44%	8,024
Ness	1,016	46.52%	1,106	50.64%	28	1.28%	13	0.60%	21	0.96%	-90	-4.12%	2,184
Norton	2,201	60.55%	1,337	36.78%	44	1.21%	26	0.72%	27	0.74%	864	23.77%	3,635
Osage	2,945	50.53%	2,755	47.27%	61	1.04%	31	0.53%	36	0.62%	190	3.26%	5,828
Osborne	1,574	55.42%	1,190	41.90%	28	0.99%	17	0.60%	31	1.09%	384	13.52%	2,840
Ottawa	1,629	52.86%	1,393	45.20%	37	1.20%	6	0.19%	17	0.55%	236	7.66%	3,082
Pawnee	1,692	45.11%	1,959	52.23%	47	1.25%	12	0.32%	41	1.09%	-267	-7.12%	3,751
Phillips	2,317	63.05%	1,264	34.39%	48	1.31%	28	0.76%	18	0.49%	1,053	28.66%	3,675
Pottawatomie	3,483	59.06%	2,316	39.27%	59	1.00%	17	0.29%	22	0.37%	1,167	19.79%	5,897
Pratt	2,427	50.04%	2,307	47.57%	61	1.26%	11	0.23%	44	0.91%	120	2.47%	4,850
Rawlins	1,148	53.87%	903	42.37%	42	1.97%	22	1.03%	16	0.75%	245	11.50%	2,131
Reno	11,212	42.29%	14,620	55.14%	333	1.26%	107	0.40%	240	0.91%	-3,408	-12.85%	26,512
Republic	2,294	57.44%	1,617	40.49%	47	1.18%	13	0.33%	23	0.58%	677	16.95%	3,994
Rice	2,584	44.82%	3,056	53.01%	64	1.11%	19	0.33%	42	0.73%	-472	-8.19%	5,765
Riley	9,518	57.45%	6,540	39.47%	394	2.38%	34	0.21%	82	0.49%	2,978	17.98%	16,568
Rooks	1,664	53.04%	1,412	45.01%	33	1.05%	11	0.35%	17	0.54%	252	8.03%	3,137
Rush	1,170	45.33%	1,359	52.65%	31	1.20%	6	0.23%	15	0.58%	-189	-7.32%	2,581
Russell	3,165	67.79%	1,453	31.12%	32	0.69%	9	0.19%	10	0.21%	1,712	36.67%	4,669
Saline	11,218	55.79%	8,476	42.15%	271	1.35%	59	0.29%	83	0.41%	2,742	13.64%	20,107
Scott	1,195	54.74%	919	42.10%	39	1.79%	16	0.73%	14	0.64%	276	12.64%	2,183
Sedgwick	69,828	50.74%	63,989	46.49%	1,616	1.17%	723	0.53%	1,473	1.07%	5,839	4.25%	137,629
Seward	3,604	64.19%	1,907	33.96%	59	1.05%	11	0.20%	34	0.61%	1,697	30.23%	5,615
Shawnee	37,101	55.07%	28,578	42.42%	995	1.48%	288	0.43%	408	0.61%	8,523	12.65%	67,370
Sheridan	838	49.15%	793	46.51%	48	2.82%	11	0.65%	15	0.88%	45	2.64%	1,705
Sherman	1,671	50.15%	1,573	47.21%	55	1.65%	17	0.51%	16	0.48%	98	2.94%	3,332
Smith	2,009	58.47%	1,333	38.80%	47	1.37%	24	0.70%	23	0.67%	676	19.67%	3,436
Stafford	1,430	45.22%	1,659	52.47%	32	1.01%	7	0.22%	34	1.08%	-229	-7.25%	3,162
Stanton	510	49.04%	489	47.02%	14	1.35%	14	1.35%	13	1.25%	21	2.02%	1,040
Stevens	1,262	57.23%	901	40.86%	24	1.09%	10	0.45%	8	0.36%	361	16.37%	2,205
Sumner	4,645	44.92%	5,385	52.08%	138	1.33%	87	0.84%	85	0.82%	-740	-7.16%	10,340
Thomas	2,246	53.94%	1,802	43.28%	60	1.44%	26	0.62%	30	0.72%	444	10.66%	4,164
Trego	1,025	49.56%	1,003	48.50%	25	1.21%	8	0.39%	7	0.34%	22	1.06%	2,068
Wabaunsee	1,921	57.58%	1,354	40.59%	32	0.96%	17	0.51%	12	0.36%	567	16.99%	3,336
Wallace	600	52.77%	486	42.74%	32	2.81%	8	0.70%	11	0.97%	114	10.03%	1,137
Washington	2,543	60.36%	1,564	37.12%	63	1.50%	10	0.24%	33	0.78%	979	23.24%	4,213
Wichita	593	47.90%	614	49.60%	12	0.97%	8	0.65%	11	0.89%	-21	-1.70%	1,238
Wilson	2,682	55.67%	2,047	42.49%	46	0.95%	26	0.54%	17	0.35%	635	13.18%	4,818
Woodson	1,104	54.09%	904	44.29%	17	0.83%	7	0.34%	9	0.44%	200	9.80%	2,041
Wyandotte	23,141	36.99%	37,478	59.91%	903	1.44%	318	0.51%	715	1.14%	-14,337	-22.92%	62,555
Totals	502,752	52.49%	430,421	44.94%	13,185	1.38%	4,724	0.49%	6,763	0.71%	72,331	7.55%	957,845

==== Counties that flipped from Republican to Democratic ====
- Anderson
- Atchison
- Butler
- Cherokee
- Cloud
- Crawford
- Edwards
- Ellis
- Finney
- Ford
- Gray
- Greeley
- Hamilton
- Hodgeman
- Kingman
- Labette
- Miami
- Ness
- Pawnee
- Reno
- Rice
- Rush
- Stafford
- Sumner
- Wichita
- Wyandotte

=== By congressional district ===
Ford won all five congressional districts, including two that elected Democrats.

District	Ford	Carter	Representative
1st	53.8%	46.2%	Keith Sebelius
2nd	55.2%	44.8%	Martha Keys
3rd	58.2%	41.8%	Larry Winn
4th	51.0%	49.0%	Dan Glickman
5th	51.0%	49.0%	Joe Skubitz

== See also ==
- United States presidential elections in Kansas
