= Dalton Gang Hideout and Museum =

- U.S. National Register of Historic Places
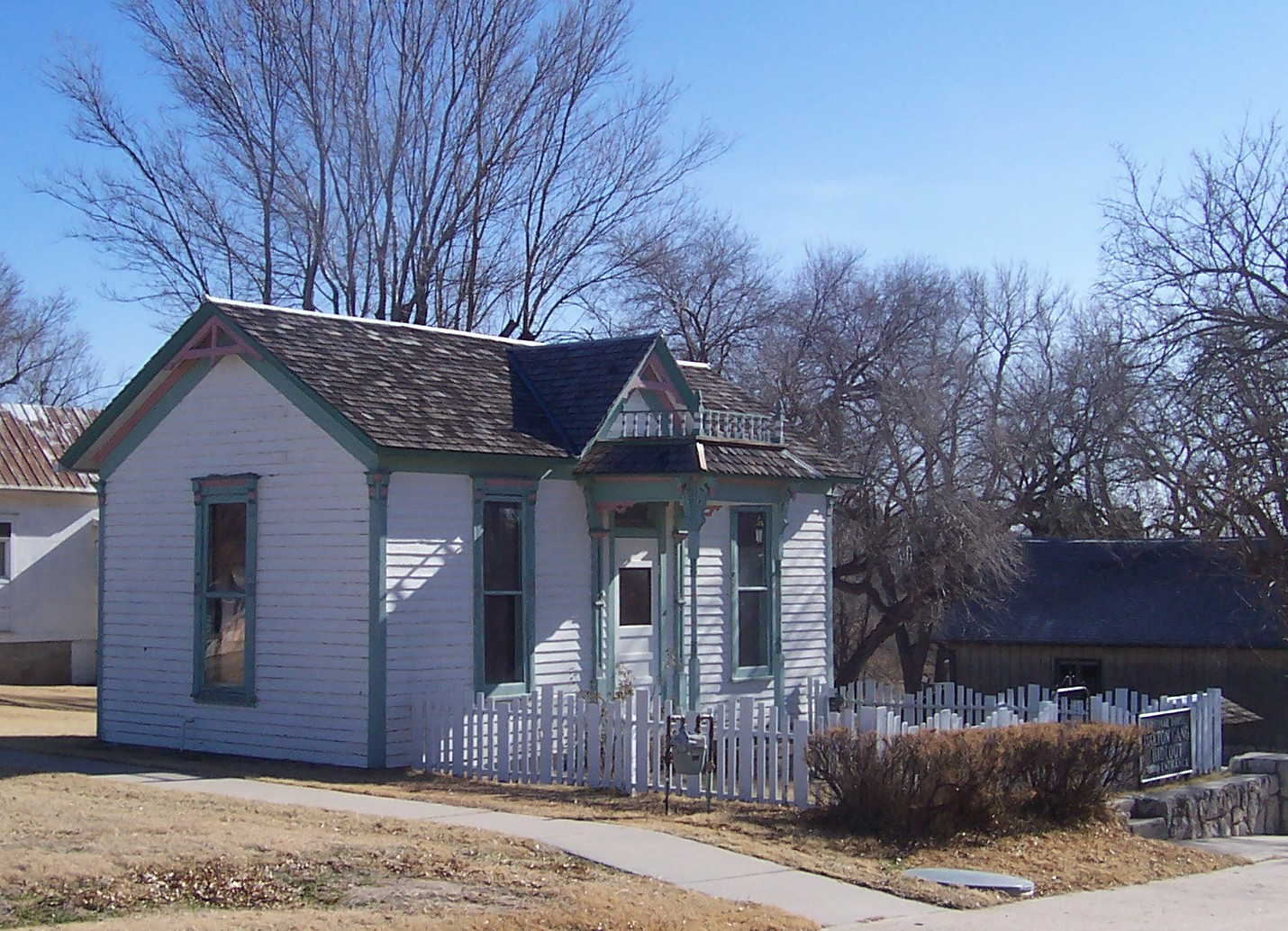
- Whipple House at the Dalton Gang Hideout and Museum

- Location within Kansas Location within the United States
- Location: 502 S. Pearlette St. Meade, Kansas
- Coordinates: 37.280°N 100.337°W
- Area: 1.2 acres (0.49 ha)
- Architectural style: Victorian
- Website: The Dalton Gang Hideout
- NRHP reference No.: 14001121
- Added to NRHP: January 7, 2015

The Dalton Gang Hideout and Museum is a tourist attraction in Meade, Kansas. The complex encompasses a home, a museum on the top floor of a barn, and contributing objects. Originally owned by the sister and brother-in-law of the outlaw Dalton Gang brothers, local folklore says the brothers took refuge from the law in their sister's home. Restoration of the property was done in 1941 by the Works Progress Administration and the National Youth Administration. It was listed on the National Register of Historic Places on January 7, 2015.

== Original owners ==
Eva Dalton, sister of the Dalton Gang brothers, married John N. Whipple on October 25, 1887, in Meade, Kansas. Whipple was the owner of a general store that bore his name. He sold groceries, clothing and a variety of general mercantile items. Whipple paid $400 for the house and property, which he lost to a Sheriff's sale on November 19, 1892. The new occupants of the house were H. G. Marshall and family. They discovered a small hidden tunnel that led from a closet door beneath the house stairwell, through the basement and to the barn. The Marshall daughter Mrs. Roy Talbott recalled incidents of strangers entering their home through the stairwell closet, after having left their horses in the barn. Entrance to the tunnel was sealed off and plastered over.

== Legend ==
The Dalton brothers were a gang of 19th century robbers who stole from banks and trains. Historian Richard White has made the case that the Daltons were "social bandits"; that is, outlaws enabled by supporters who either actively helped them evade capture, kept silent about what they knew, or otherwise abetted the criminals. Such social bandits, White wrote, lived openly in communities who accepted them as friends and neighbors.

The property being named as the hideout of Eva's outlaw brothers stems from a local legend that arose in the 20th century, claiming the brothers used it as a place of refuge. The brothers were known to have been in Meade in the years prior to their crime spree that began in 1890. No supporting documentation of their presence in Meade after that date has thus far surfaced.

One of the earliest mentions of the legend came from the Wayne Settle family who owned the home in the 1930s, and supposedly had no prior knowledge of the walled-off tunnel. They recounted a visit from a stranger who claimed to have been part of the Dalton Gang, and was able to direct them to the tunnel's entrance. When the property was being developed into a tourist attraction in 1940, two individuals provided oral accounts that added to the lore. Local newspaper publisher Frank Fuhr claimed that he had used a telescope to watch the gang members enter, but never exit, the barn. Belle Mackey gave an interview to the local newspaper alleging that she and her husband unknowingly had Emmett Dalton as their ranch guest for two days in 1892, without asking his name or any other details. She claimed it was only after seeing Dalton's picture in a newspaper over a year later, that she believed he had been their visitor.

== Restoration and new construction ==
The Works Progress Administration (WPA) was a government jobs creation program during the administration of President Franklin D. Roosevelt, that included historic preservation, programs in the arts, and building or improving infrastructure such as parks. The National Youth Administration (NYA) came under the aegis of the WPA and was a jobs creation program for young men and women between the ages of 16 and 25. Kansas: a Guide to the Sunflower State, published in 1939 by the Federal Writer's Project of the WPA, listed the population of Meade as 1,552, and describes the town as, "... spreads out pleasantly on the prairie. It differs from most western Kansas towns in that it has many trees, shrubs and green lawns, made possible by an abundant supply of artesian water."

The Dalton Gang museum and park, composed of the Whipple property, was opened to the public in July 1940, having been purchased by the Meade Chamber of Commerce. The WPA, NYA and Meade Chamber of Commerce worked together in 1941 to restore existing structures and add new construction, with the wood-frame Whipple Victorian cottage as a centerpiece. The original hinged front door, with its small porch and front stoop remains intact but is no longer used as the entrance. Visitors must first enter the barn to access the 4-room house through the tunnel.

The 2-story barn with its secret tunnel was reconstructed by the WPA in 1941, with the second floor housing the museum that had been originally operated out of the Whipple home by Ruth and Walter Dingess. Although the barn has a wooden shingle roof and a wood frame on both floors, and metal bars on the ground-floor windows, the foundation is of concrete. Gypsum was hauled in from Clark County to construct the basement walls. The 96-foot tunnel is only 32 inches wide and 80 inches high, and was constructed by both the WPA and NYA, also in 1941. Additional objects contributing to the NRHP listing that were built in 1941, are the wishing well, outdoor stove and the stone wall around the property.

== Later development NRHP listing ==
Dad's Country Store was erected in 1951 and is considered a contributing property to the NRHP listing. A commemorative bell with a plaque honoring the contributions of Walter Dingle was installed in the yard in 1959. The Heritage House was donated and moved to the park in 1969. The property was listed on the NRHP in Meade County, Kansas on January 7, 2015.

== See also ==
- List of museums in Kansas
