= Montezuma, Kansas =

City in Gray County, Kansas

- City
- Location within Gray County and Kansas

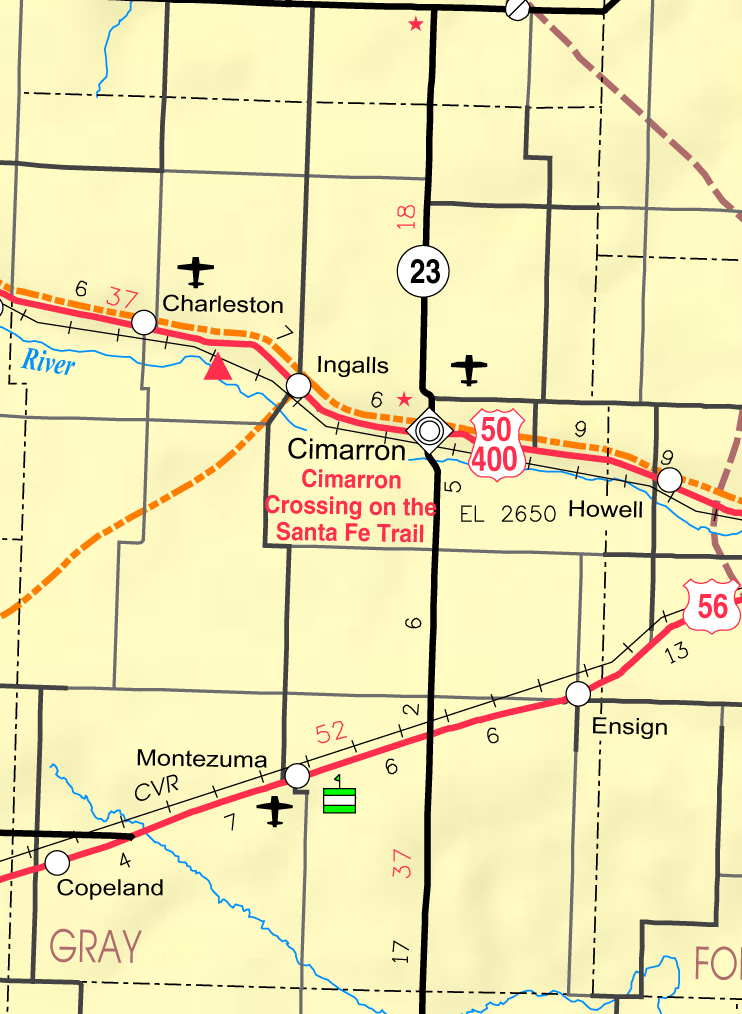
- KDOT map of Gray County (legend)
- Coordinates: 37°35′33″N 100°27′00″W
- Country: United States
- State: Kansas
- County: Gray
- Founded: 1879
- Incorporated: 1917
- Named for: Moctezuma II

Area
  - Total: 0.98 sq mi (2.55 km^{2})
  - Land: 0.98 sq mi (2.55 km^{2})
  - Water: 0 sq mi (0.00 km^{2})
- Elevation: 2,779 ft (847 m)

Population (2020)
  - Total: 975
  - Density: 990/sq mi (382/km^{2})
- Time zone: UTC-6 (CST)
  - Summer (DST): UTC-5 (CDT)
- ZIP Code: 67867
- Area code: 620
- FIPS code: 20-47875
- GNIS ID: 2395379
- Website: cityofmontezumaks.com

Montezuma is a city in Gray County, Kansas, United States. As of the 2020 census, the population of the city was 975.

== History ==
Montezuma was founded in 1879, and relocated in 1912 to the Santa Fe Railroad. It was named for Moctezuma II, ruler of the Aztec empire.

== Geography ==
According to the United States Census Bureau, the city has a total area of 0.76 square miles (1.97 km^{2}), all land.

=== Climate ===
According to the Köppen Climate Classification system, Montezuma has a semi-arid climate, abbreviated "BSk" on climate maps.

Climate data for Montezuma, Kansas (1991–2020)
Month	Jan	Feb	Mar	Apr	May	Jun	Jul	Aug	Sep	Oct	Nov	Dec	Year
Mean daily maximum °F (°C)	46.5 (8.1)	50.4 (10.2)	60.1 (15.6)	68.6 (20.3)	78.2 (25.7)	87.7 (30.9)	93.3 (34.1)	90.4 (32.4)	83.3 (28.5)	71.1 (21.7)	58.1 (14.5)	46.9 (8.3)	69.6 (20.9)
Daily mean °F (°C)	32.5 (0.3)	35.7 (2.1)	44.6 (7.0)	53.0 (11.7)	63.5 (17.5)	73.7 (23.2)	79.0 (26.1)	76.5 (24.7)	68.7 (20.4)	55.9 (13.3)	43.2 (6.2)	33.5 (0.8)	55.0 (12.8)
Mean daily minimum °F (°C)	18.5 (−7.5)	20.9 (−6.2)	29.0 (−1.7)	37.5 (3.1)	48.8 (9.3)	59.7 (15.4)	64.6 (18.1)	62.7 (17.1)	54.2 (12.3)	40.8 (4.9)	28.2 (−2.1)	20.0 (−6.7)	40.4 (4.7)
Average precipitation inches (mm)	0.56 (14)	0.55 (14)	1.27 (32)	1.81 (46)	2.78 (71)	3.46 (88)	3.20 (81)	3.04 (77)	1.39 (35)	2.01 (51)	0.75 (19)	0.91 (23)	21.73 (551)
Average snowfall inches (cm)	3.7 (9.4)	2.8 (7.1)	3.1 (7.9)	1.0 (2.5)	0.1 (0.25)	0.0 (0.0)	0.0 (0.0)	0.0 (0.0)	0.0 (0.0)	0.5 (1.3)	1.0 (2.5)	3.6 (9.1)	15.8 (40.05)
Source: NOAA

== Demographics ==
Historical population
Census	Pop.	Note	%±
1920	163		—
1930	424		160.1%
1940	340		−19.8%
1950	509		49.7%
1960	543		6.7%
1970	606		11.6%
1980	730		20.5%
1990	838		14.8%
2000	966		15.3%
2010	966		0.0%
2020	975		0.9%
U.S. Decennial Census

=== 2020 census ===
The 2020 United States census counted 975 people, 400 households, and 246 families in Montezuma. The population density was 960.6 per square mile (370.9/km^{2}). There were 425 housing units at an average density of 418.7 per square mile (161.7/km^{2}). The racial makeup was 89.95% (877) white or European American (86.87% non-Hispanic white), 0.0% (0) black or African-American, 0.0% (0) Native American or Alaska Native, 0.0% (0) Asian, 0.0% (0) Pacific Islander or Native Hawaiian, 3.08% (30) from other races, and 6.97% (68) from two or more races. Hispanic or Latino of any race was 10.87% (106) of the population.

Of the 400 households, 26.2% had children under the age of 18; 52.8% were married couples living together; 26.5% had a female householder with no spouse or partner present. 34.5% of households consisted of individuals and 20.5% had someone living alone who was 65 years of age or older. The average household size was 2.3 and the average family size was 3.1. The percent of those with a bachelor's degree or higher was estimated to be 10.1% of the population.

23.0% of the population was under the age of 18, 6.8% from 18 to 24, 22.2% from 25 to 44, 17.8% from 45 to 64, and 30.3% who were 65 years of age or older. The median age was 43.0 years. For every 100 females, there were 116.2 males. For every 100 females ages 18 and older, there were 120.9 males.

The 2016–2020 5-year American Community Survey estimates show that the median household income was $53,469 (with a margin of error of +/- $7,582) and the median family income was $72,321 (+/- $15,906). Males had a median income of $50,060 (+/- $12,325) versus $13,125 (+/- $12,554) for females. The median income for those above 16 years old was $30,820 (+/- $3,753). Approximately, 4.2% of families and 5.5% of the population were below the poverty line, including 7.5% of those under the age of 18 and 6.3% of those ages 65 or over.

=== 2010 census ===
As of the census of 2010, there were 966 people, 366 households, and 249 families residing in the city. The population density was 1,271.1 inhabitants per square mile (490.8/km^{2}). There were 390 housing units at an average density of 513.2 per square mile (198.1/km^{2}). The racial makeup of the city was 95.7% White, 0.1% African American, 0.9% Native American, 2.5% from other races, and 0.8% from two or more races. Hispanic or Latino of any race were 11.0% of the population.

There were 366 households, of which 30.1% had children under the age of 18 living with them, 59.6% were married couples living together, 5.7% had a female householder with no husband present, 2.7% had a male householder with no wife present, and 32.0% were non-families. 28.7% of all households were made up of individuals, and 16.1% had someone living alone who was 65 years of age or older. The average household size was 2.50 and the average family size was 3.14.

The median age in the city was 36.8 years. 24.9% of residents were under the age of 18; 8.1% were between the ages of 18 and 24; 24.4% were from 25 to 44; 19.1% were from 45 to 64; and 23.5% were 65 years of age or older. The gender makeup of the city was 45.5% male and 54.5% female.

== Economy ==
The Gray County Wind Farm near Montezuma is the largest wind farm in Kansas.

== Education ==
South Gray Schools consists of Copeland USD 476 and Montezuma USD 371. They include an Elementary school and Junior High School in Copeland, and an Elementary and High School in Montezuma. The South Gray High School mascot is the Rebels.

Prior to school unification, the Montezuma High School mascot was the Indians. The Montezuma Indians won the Kansas State High School boys class BB basketball championship in 1955.
