= Montezuma Township, Kansas =

Montezuma Township
- Township
- Location in Gray County
- Coordinates: 37°34′45″N 100°31′02″W
- Country: United States
- State: Kansas
- County: Gray

Area
  - Total: 198.61 sq mi (514.39 km^{2})
  - Land: 198.47 sq mi (514.04 km^{2})
  - Water: 0.14 sq mi (0.35 km^{2}) 0.07%
- Elevation: 2,769 ft (844 m)

Population (2020)
  - Total: 1,540
  - Density: 7.76/sq mi (3.00/km^{2})
- GNIS feature ID: 0470573

Montezuma Township is a township in Gray County, Kansas, United States. As of the 2020 census, its population was 1,540.

== Geography ==
Montezuma Township covers an area of 198.61 square miles (514.4 km^{2}) and contains one incorporated settlement, Montezuma. According to the USGS, it contains two cemeteries: Evans and Fairview.

Wild Horse Lake is within this township.
