= Gray County, Kansas =

County in Kansas, United States

- County
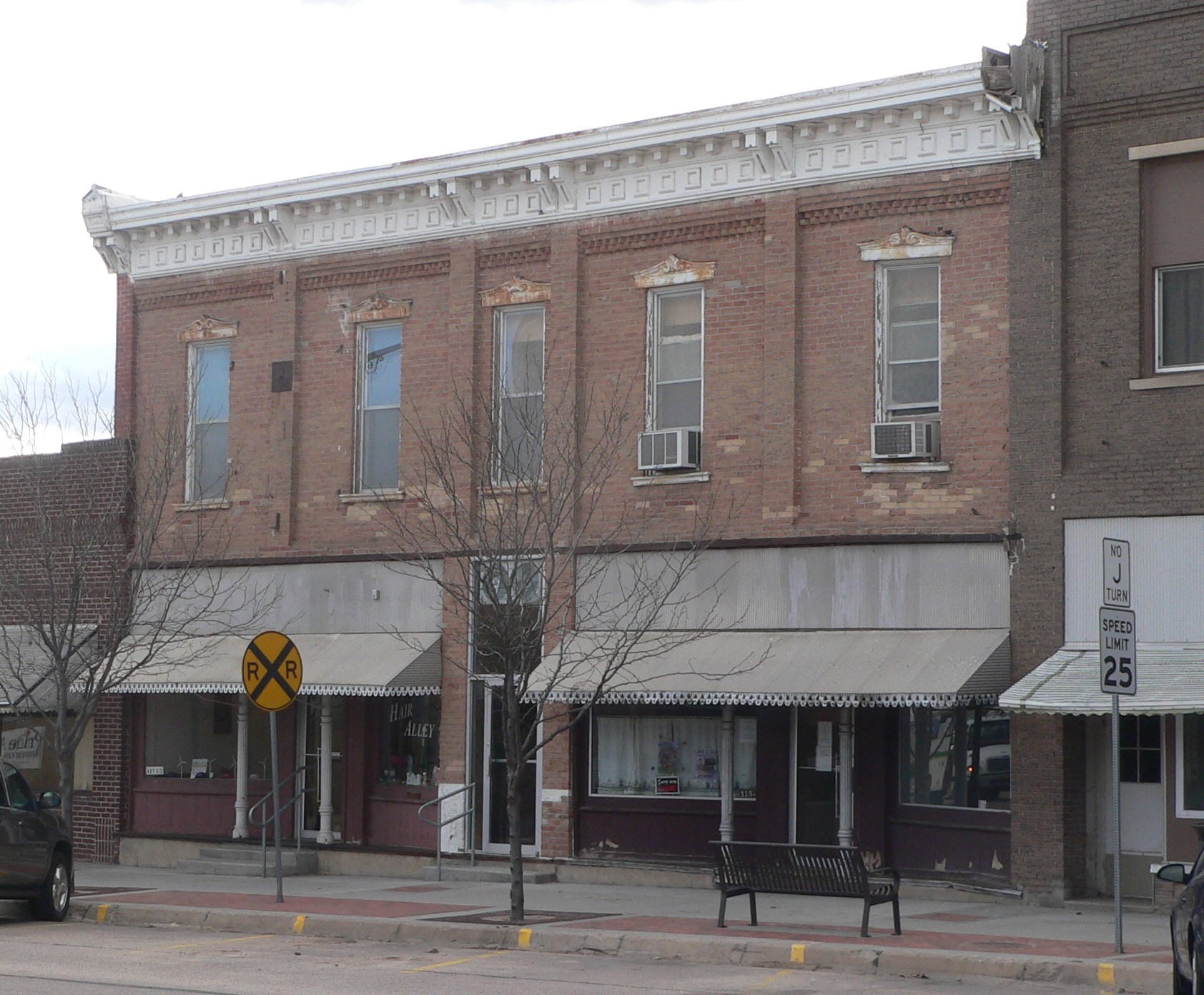
- Former Gray County Courthouse in Cimarron (2015)

- Location within the U.S. state of Kansas
- Coordinates: 37°44′00″N 100°25′59″W
- Country: United States
- State: Kansas
- Founded: March 13, 1881
- Named for: Alfred Gray
- Seat: Cimarron
- Largest city: Cimarron

Area
  - Total: 869 sq mi (2,250 km^{2})
  - Land: 869 sq mi (2,250 km^{2})
  - Water: 0.4 sq mi (1.0 km^{2}) 0.05%

Population (2020)
  - Total: 5,653
  - Estimate (2025): 5,652 ▼
  - Density: 6.5/sq mi (2.5/km^{2})
- Time zone: UTC−6 (Central)
  - Summer (DST): UTC−5 (CDT)
- Congressional district: 1st
- Website: GrayCo.org

Gray County is a county located in the U.S. state of Kansas. Its county seat and most populous city is Cimarron. As of the 2020 census, the county population was 5,653. The county was named after Alfred Gray, a 19th-century Kansas politician.

== History ==
For millennia, the Great Plains of North America were inhabited by nomadic Native Americans.

In 1854, the Kansas Territory was organized, then in 1861 Kansas became the 34th U.S. state.

Gray County was founded in 1881 and named for Alfred Gray. Between 1887 and 1893, a county seat war took place in Gray County that involved several notable Old West figures, such as Bat Masterson, Bill Tilghman, and Ben Daniels. As a result of the dispute, Cimarron became the permanent county seat of Gray County.

== Geography ==
According to the U.S. Census Bureau, the county has a total area of 869 square miles (2,250 km^{2}), of which 869 square miles (2,250 km^{2}) is land and 0.4 square miles (1.0 km^{2}) (0.05%) is water.

Since 2001, NextEra Energy Resources has operated the largest wind farm in Kansas—170 turbines with a generating capacity of 110 megawatts—on a 12,000-acre (49 km^{2}) site near Montezuma.

=== Adjacent counties ===
- Finney County (north)
- Hodgeman County (northeast)
- Ford County (east)
- Meade County (south)
- Haskell County (west)

== Demographics ==
Historical population
Census	Pop.	Note	%±
1890	2,415		—
1900	1,264		−47.7%
1910	3,121		146.9%
1920	4,711		50.9%
1930	6,211		31.8%
1940	4,773		−23.2%
1950	4,894		2.5%
1960	4,380		−10.5%
1970	4,516		3.1%
1980	5,138		13.8%
1990	5,396		5.0%
2000	5,904		9.4%
2010	6,006		1.7%
2020	5,653		−5.9%
2025 (est.)	5,652	▼	0.0%
U.S. Decennial Census; 1790–1960 1900–1990; 1990–2000 2010–2020

=== 2020 census ===
As of the 2020 census, the county had a population of 5,653. The median age was 37.7 years, 28.4% of residents were under the age of 18, and 17.8% were 65 years of age or older. For every 100 females there were 102.6 males, and for every 100 females age 18 and over there were 99.9 males. 0.0% of residents lived in urban areas, while 100.0% lived in rural areas.

The racial makeup of the county was 86.3% White, 0.3% Black or African American, 0.3% American Indian and Alaska Native, 0.2% Asian, 0.0% Native Hawaiian and Pacific Islander, 4.9% from some other race, and 7.9% from two or more races. Hispanic or Latino residents of any race comprised 14.8% of the population.

There were 2,092 households in the county, of which 36.4% had children under the age of 18 living with them and 16.8% had a female householder with no spouse or partner present. About 23.2% of all households were made up of individuals and 10.6% had someone living alone who was 65 years of age or older.

There were 2,327 housing units, of which 10.1% were vacant. Among occupied housing units, 74.7% were owner-occupied and 25.3% were renter-occupied. The homeowner vacancy rate was 1.7% and the rental vacancy rate was 9.8%.

=== 2000 census ===
As of the 2000 census, there were 5,904 people, 2,045 households, and 1,556 families residing in the county. The population density was 7 people per square mile (2.7 people/km^{2}). There were 2,181 housing units at an average density of 2 per square mile (0.77/km^{2}). The racial makeup of the county was 92.31% White, 0.46% Native American, 0.19% Black or African American, 0.10% Asian, 0.07% Pacific Islander, 5.42% from other races, and 1.46% from two or more races. Hispanic or Latino of any race were 9.81% of the population.

There were 2,045 households, out of which 42.00% had children under the age of 18 living with them, 67.70% were married couples living together, 5.60% had a female householder with no husband present, and 23.90% were non-families. 21.20% of all households were made up of individuals, and 9.40% had someone living alone who was 65 years of age or older. The average household size was 2.82 and the average family size was 3.31.

In the county, the population was spread out, with 31.60% under the age of 18, 8.30% from 18 to 24, 27.30% from 25 to 44, 20.20% from 45 to 64, and 12.70% who were 65 years of age or older. The median age was 33 years. For every 100 females there were 100.10 males. For every 100 females age 18 and over, there were 96.20 males.

The median income for a household in the county was $40,000, and the median income for a family was $45,299. Males had a median income of $31,519 versus $21,563 for females. The per capita income for the county was $18,632. About 6.50% of families and 9.10% of the population were below the poverty line, including 11.80% of those under age 18 and 8.00% of those age 65 or over.

=== Religion ===
Gray County has by far the highest percentage of adherents of the Church of God in Christ, Mennonite in the US. There were 1,032 members of the Church in Gray County in 2010, which is 17.18% of the population. It is the largest Church in the county.

== Government ==
=== Presidential elections ===
Gray County votes predominantly for Republican candidates in presidential elections. The last time a Democratic candidate carried this county was Jimmy Carter in 1976.

Presidential election results

United States presidential election results for Gray County, Kansas
Year	Republican		Democratic		Third party(ies)	
Year	No.	%	No.	%	No.	%
1888	417	53.81%	268	34.58%	90	11.61%
1892	274	54.37%	0	0.00%	230	45.63%
1896	153	53.50%	133	46.50%	0	0.00%
1900	188	55.79%	145	43.03%	4	1.19%
1904	285	64.48%	113	25.57%	44	9.95%
1908	372	46.79%	338	42.52%	85	10.69%
1912	112	15.95%	243	34.62%	347	49.43%
1916	660	38.66%	889	52.08%	158	9.26%
1920	962	62.18%	507	32.77%	78	5.04%
1924	959	59.34%	463	28.65%	194	12.00%
1928	1,294	67.47%	606	31.60%	18	0.94%
1932	910	39.27%	1,348	58.18%	59	2.55%
1936	764	34.34%	1,459	65.57%	2	0.09%
1940	1,056	51.87%	962	47.25%	18	0.88%
1944	1,057	57.01%	775	41.80%	22	1.19%
1948	1,035	53.68%	869	45.07%	24	1.24%
1952	1,515	73.51%	537	26.06%	9	0.44%
1956	1,278	66.77%	627	32.76%	9	0.47%
1960	1,150	60.56%	744	39.18%	5	0.26%
1964	643	35.86%	1,136	63.36%	14	0.78%
1968	952	55.25%	612	35.52%	159	9.23%
1972	1,235	69.15%	511	28.61%	40	2.24%
1976	837	42.08%	1,111	55.86%	41	2.06%
1980	1,310	63.68%	583	28.34%	164	7.97%
1984	1,580	74.32%	514	24.18%	32	1.51%
1988	1,180	61.55%	696	36.31%	41	2.14%
1992	1,039	47.81%	443	20.39%	691	31.80%
1996	1,457	71.53%	404	19.83%	176	8.64%
2000	1,631	75.51%	482	22.31%	47	2.18%
2004	1,816	80.89%	408	18.17%	21	0.94%
2008	1,643	77.54%	436	20.58%	40	1.89%
2012	1,603	81.87%	324	16.55%	31	1.58%
2016	1,698	82.19%	263	12.73%	105	5.08%
2020	1,911	83.52%	341	14.90%	36	1.57%
2024	1,837	83.77%	324	14.77%	32	1.46%

=== Laws ===
Although the Kansas Constitution was amended in 1986 to allow the sale of alcoholic liquor by the individual drink with the approval of voters, Gray County has remained a prohibition, or "dry", county.

== Education ==
=== Unified school districts ===
- Cimarron–Ensign USD 102
- Montezuma USD 371
- Copeland USD 476
- Ingalls USD 477

== Communities ==
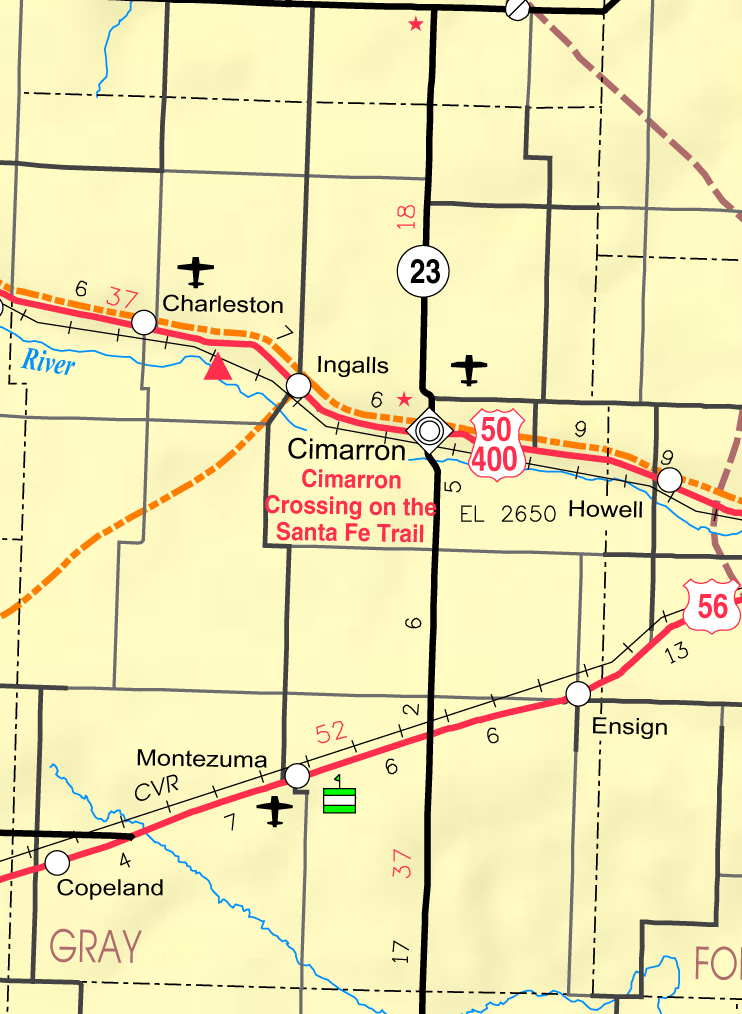
2005 map of Gray County (map legend)

List of townships / incorporated cities / unincorporated communities / extinct former communities within Gray County.

=== Cities and Towns ===
- Cimarron (county seat)
- Copeland
- Ensign
- Ingalls
- Montezuma

=== Unincorporated communities ===
- Charleston
- Haggard

=== Townships ===
Gray County is divided into seven townships. None of the cities within the county are considered governmentally independent, and all figures for the townships include those of the cities. In the following table, the population center is the largest city (or cities) included in that township's population total, if it is of a significant size.

Township	FIPS	Population center	Population	Population density /km^{2} (/sq mi)	Land area km^{2} (sq mi)	Water area km^{2} (sq mi)	Water %	Geographic coordinates
Cimarron	13300	Cimarron	2,379	9 (24)	254 (98)	0 (0)	0.03%	37°48′22″N 100°20′52″W
Copeland	15500	Copeland	540	2 (6)	233 (90)	0 (0)	0.15%	37°33′57″N 100°37′14″W
East Hess	19525		372	1 (3)	281 (108)	0 (0)	0.03%	37°37′45″N 100°15′39″W
Foote	23675		126	0 (1)	310 (120)	0 (0)	0.02%	37°55′44″N 100°20′46″W
Ingalls	34250		646	2 (5)	349 (135)	0 (0)	0.03%	37°47′43″N 100°30′23″W
Logan	41900		216	1 (2)	309 (119)	0 (0)	0.04%	37°55′20″N 100°33′52″W
Montezuma	47900	Montezuma	1,625	3 (8)	514 (198)	0 (0)	0.07%	37°35′56″N 100°26′11″W
Sources: "Census 2000 U.S. Gazetteer Files". U.S. Census Bureau, Geography Division. Archived from the original on August 2, 2002.

== See also ==
- Dry counties

Community information for Kansas

- Kansas locations by per capita income
- List of counties in Kansas
- List of townships in Kansas
- List of cities in Kansas
- List of unincorporated communities in Kansas
- List of ghost towns in Kansas
