= Copeland, Kansas =

City in Gray County, Kansas

- City
- Location within Gray County and Kansas

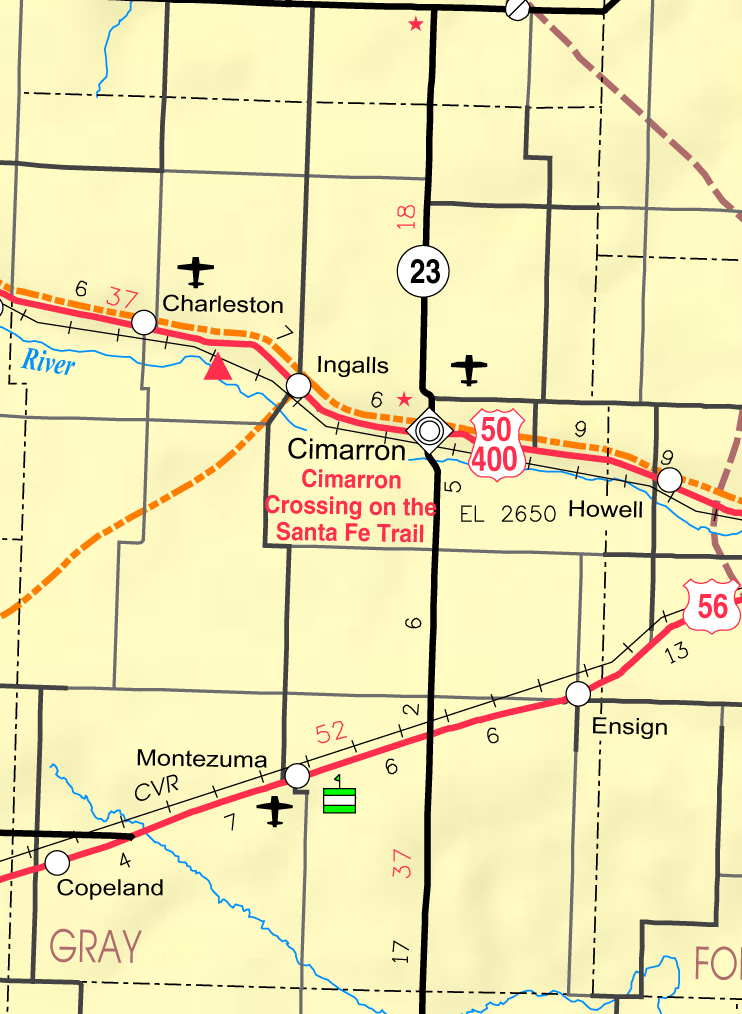
- KDOT map of Gray County (legend)
- Coordinates: 37°32′24″N 100°37′42″W
- Country: United States
- State: Kansas
- County: Gray
- Founded: 1912
- Incorporated: 1927
- Named for: E.L. Copeland

Area
  - Total: 0.23 sq mi (0.60 km^{2})
  - Land: 0.23 sq mi (0.60 km^{2})
  - Water: 0 sq mi (0.00 km^{2})
- Elevation: 2,822 ft (860 m)

Population (2020)
  - Total: 251
  - Density: 1,100/sq mi (420/km^{2})
- Time zone: UTC−6 (CST)
  - Summer (DST): UTC−5 (CDT)
- ZIP Code: 67837
- Area code: 620
- FIPS code: 20-15475
- GNIS ID: 2393631

Copeland is a city in Gray County, Kansas, United States. As of the 2020 census, the population of the city was 251.

== History ==
Copeland was founded in 1912. It was named for E. L. Copeland, an official of the Santa Fe Railroad.

The first post office in Copeland was established in October 1912.

== Geography ==
According to the United States Census Bureau, the city has a total area of 0.25 square miles (0.65 km^{2}), all land.

== Demographics ==
Historical population
Census	Pop.	Note	%±
1930	423		—
1940	262		−38.1%
1950	242		−7.6%
1960	247		2.1%
1970	267		8.1%
1980	323		21.0%
1990	290		−10.2%
2000	339		16.9%
2010	310		−8.6%
2020	251		−19.0%
U.S. Decennial Census

=== 2020 census ===
The 2020 United States census counted 251 people, 93 households, and 71 families in Copeland. The population density was 1,077.3 per square mile (415.9/km^{2}). There were 118 housing units at an average density of 506.4 per square mile (195.5/km^{2}). The racial makeup was 93.63% (235) white or European American (85.66% non-Hispanic white), 0.0% (0) black or African-American, 0.0% (0) Native American or Alaska Native, 0.0% (0) Asian, 0.0% (0) Pacific Islander or Native Hawaiian, 2.79% (7) from other races, and 3.59% (9) from two or more races. Hispanic or Latino of any race was 11.55% (29) of the population.

Of the 93 households, 30.1% had children under the age of 18; 61.3% were married couples living together; 18.3% had a female householder with no spouse or partner present. 22.6% of households consisted of individuals and 15.1% had someone living alone who was 65 years of age or older. The average household size was 2.6 and the average family size was 3.4. The percent of those with a bachelor's degree or higher was estimated to be 11.2% of the population.

30.7% of the population was under the age of 18, 5.2% from 18 to 24, 19.1% from 25 to 44, 25.5% from 45 to 64, and 19.5% who were 65 years of age or older. The median age was 41.5 years. For every 100 females, there were 102.4 males. For every 100 females ages 18 and older, there were 97.7 males.

The 2016–2020 5-year American Community Survey estimates show that the median household income was $52,188 (with a margin of error of +/- $22,342) and the median family income was $66,875 (+/- $14,576). Males had a median income of $35,288 (+/- $31,194) versus $12,917 (+/- $12,107) for females. Approximately, 3.6% of families and 3.0% of the population were below the poverty line, including 4.9% of those under the age of 18 and 3.7% of those ages 65 or over.

=== 2010 census ===
As of the census of 2010, there were 310 people, 112 households, and 87 families residing in the city. The population density was 1,240.0 inhabitants per square mile (478.8/km^{2}). There were 130 housing units at an average density of 520.0 per square mile (200.8/km^{2}). The racial makeup of the city was 96.1% White, 1.6% African American, 0.3% Native American, and 1.9% from other races. Hispanic or Latino of any race were 5.2% of the population.

There were 112 households, of which 36.6% had children under the age of 18 living with them, 71.4% were married couples living together, 1.8% had a female householder with no husband present, 4.5% had a male householder with no wife present, and 22.3% were non-families. 20.5% of all households were made up of individuals, and 8.9% had someone living alone who was 65 years of age or older. The average household size was 2.77 and the average family size was 3.25.

The median age in the city was 37.3 years. 30.3% of residents were under the age of 18; 7.7% were between the ages of 18 and 24; 23.3% were from 25 to 44; 25.5% were from 45 to 64; and 13.2% were 65 years of age or older. The gender makeup of the city was 54.2% male and 45.8% female.

== Education ==
South Gray Schools consists of Copeland USD 476 and Montezuma USD 371. They include an Elementary school and Junior High School in Copeland, and an Elementary and High School in Montezuma.

Prior to school unification, Copeland was home to Copeland High School, which had a mascot known as the Vikings.
