= 1920 United States presidential election in Kansas =

- November 2, 1920
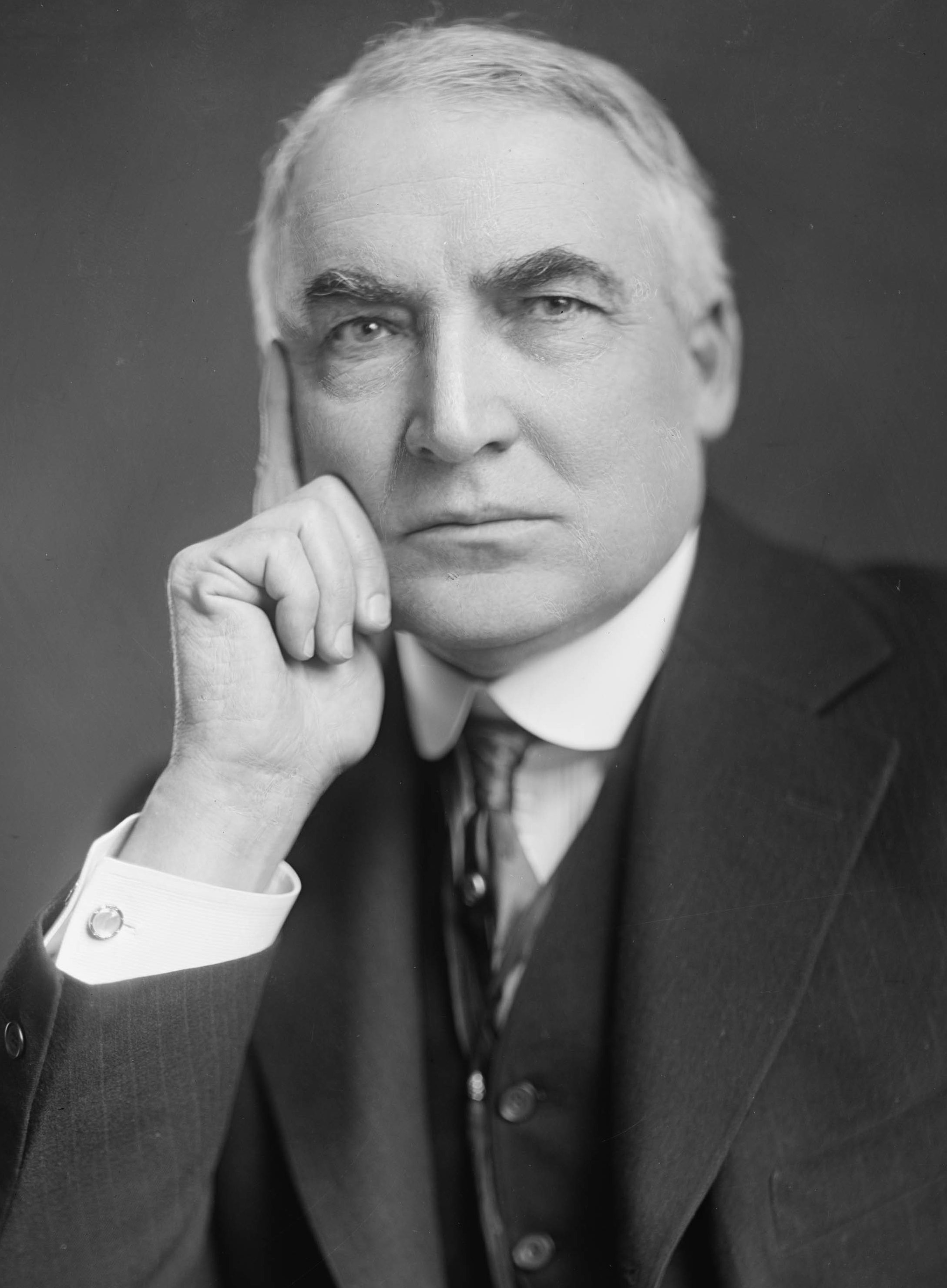

Nominee	Warren G. Harding	James M. Cox
Party	Republican	Democratic
Home state	Ohio	Ohio
Running mate	Calvin Coolidge	Franklin D. Roosevelt
Electoral vote	10	0
Popular vote	369,268	185,464
Percentage	64.75%	32.52%
County results
Harding
50–60%
60–70%
70–80%
President before election
Woodrow Wilson
Democratic
Elected President
Warren G. Harding
Republican

The 1920 United States presidential election in Kansas was held on November 2, 1920, as part of the 1920 United States presidential election. Kansas voters chose ten electors to the Electoral College, who voted for president and vice president. Kansas voted for the Republican nominee, Ohio Senator Warren G. Harding, over the Democratic nominee, Ohio Governor James M. Cox. Harding ran with Massachusetts Governor Calvin Coolidge, while Cox ran with Assistant Secretary of the Navy Franklin D. Roosevelt of New York.

Harding won the state by a margin of 32.23 percentage points. By the beginning of 1920 skyrocketing inflation and President Woodrow Wilson's focus upon his proposed League of Nations at the expense of domestic policy had helped make the incumbent president very unpopular – besides which Wilson also had major health problems that had left First Lady Edith Wilson effectively running the nation. Political unrest observed in the Palmer Raids and the "Red Scare" further added to the unpopularity of the Democratic Party, since this global political turmoil produced considerable fear of alien revolutionaries invading the country. Another issue was the anti-Cox position taken by the Ku Klux Klan, and Cox's inconsistent stance on newly passed Prohibition – he had been a "wet" but announced he would support Prohibition enforcement in August

The West had been the chief presidential battleground ever since the "System of 1896" emerged following that election. For this reason, Cox chose to tour the entire nation but the only attention Cox received in the Western press was severe criticism. Moreover, at the beginning of the presidential campaign farmers – a critical constituency in Kansas – were highly critical of the likely effect of the Cox platform upon their cost of living.

Wilson carried Kansas in his two election triumphs in 1912 and 1916. Cox did visit the state in early October, but was aggressively heckled during his only speeches in the state. Surveys earlier by Progressive journalist William Allen White had shown that two-thirds of the Kansas population were opposed to Wilson's League of Nations. At the end of October, two days before the poll, editors estimated a majority of one hundred and twenty thousand votes for Harding in Kansas, although Cox's campaign managers, especially Frank E. Doremus, believed they had a chance of holding the state.

As it turned out, Harding easily won Kansas by a two-to-one majority, fifty percent larger than predicted by the combined polls of editors at the end of October, and a swing of 37 percentage points from Wilson's victory in the state in 1916. Harding carried all 105 Kansas counties, whereas in 1916 Charles Evans Hughes had carried only 26, although the trend – dramatic as it was – was substantially smaller than Harding's landslides in heavily German-American North and South Dakota. In spite of Cox's two-to-one loss, as of 2024 this remains the last presidential election when Kansas voted less Republican than California, Illinois, Iowa, Minnesota, New York, Washington or Wisconsin.

== Results ==
Presidential Candidate	Running Mate	Party	Electoral Vote (EV)	Popular Vote (PV)	
Warren G. Harding	Calvin Coolidge	Republican	10	369,268	64.75%
James M. Cox	Franklin D. Roosevelt	Democratic	0	185,464	32.52%
Eugene V. Debs	Seymour Stedman	Socialist	0	15,511	2.72%
Write-ins	—	—	0	75	0.01%

=== Results by county ===
1920 United States presidential election in Kansas by county
County	Warren Gamaliel Harding Republican		James Middleton Cox Democratic		Eugene Victor Debs Socialist		Various candidates Write-ins		Margin		Total votes cast
County	#	%	#	%	#	%	#	%	#	%	Total votes cast
Allen	5,091	67.68%	2,272	30.20%	159	2.11%			2,819	37.48%	7,522
Anderson	3,068	62.82%	1,708	34.97%	108	2.21%			1,360	27.85%	4,884
Atchison	5,872	65.02%	3,082	34.13%	77	0.85%			2,790	30.89%	9,031
Barber	2,400	66.45%	1,098	30.40%	114	3.16%			1,302	36.05%	3,612
Barton	3,993	68.77%	1,688	29.07%	125	2.15%			2,305	39.70%	5,806
Bourbon	4,194	52.09%	3,632	45.11%	225	2.79%			562	6.98%	8,051
Brown	5,249	72.28%	1,937	26.67%	76	1.05%			3,312	45.61%	7,262
Butler	6,821	60.56%	4,112	36.51%	331	2.94%			2,709	24.05%	11,264
Chase	1,659	63.15%	904	34.41%	59	2.25%	5	0.19%	755	28.74%	2,627
Chautauqua	2,539	68.58%	936	25.28%	227	6.13%			1,603	43.30%	3,702
Cherokee	5,466	55.83%	3,832	39.14%	492	5.03%			1,634	16.69%	9,790
Cheyenne	1,079	62.41%	471	27.24%	160	9.25%	19	1.10%	608	35.16%	1,729
Clark	923	57.98%	610	38.32%	55	3.45%	4	0.25%	313	19.66%	1,592
Clay	3,521	72.69%	1,155	23.84%	168	3.47%			2,366	48.84%	4,844
Cloud	4,090	69.82%	1,534	26.19%	234	3.99%			2,556	43.63%	5,858
Coffey	3,370	64.20%	1,785	34.01%	94	1.79%			1,585	30.20%	5,249
Comanche	1,121	63.05%	612	34.42%	45	2.53%			509	28.63%	1,778
Cowley	7,352	59.22%	4,733	38.13%	329	2.65%			2,619	21.10%	12,414
Crawford	7,957	54.68%	5,362	36.84%	1,234	8.48%			2,595	17.83%	14,553
Decatur	1,448	51.55%	1,221	43.47%	140	4.98%			227	8.08%	2,809
Dickinson	5,761	69.10%	2,387	28.63%	189	2.27%			3,374	40.47%	8,337
Doniphan	3,369	76.46%	978	22.20%	59	1.34%			2,391	54.27%	4,406
Douglas	6,266	73.23%	2,197	25.67%	94	1.10%			4,069	47.55%	8,557
Edwards	1,782	70.16%	681	26.81%	77	3.03%			1,101	43.35%	2,540
Elk	2,253	65.27%	1,110	32.16%	89	2.58%			1,143	33.11%	3,452
Ellis	2,385	75.17%	740	23.32%	48	1.51%			1,645	51.84%	3,173
Ellsworth	2,264	65.60%	1,090	31.59%	97	2.81%			1,174	34.02%	3,451
Finney	1,573	68.96%	619	27.14%	89	3.90%			954	41.82%	2,281
Ford	3,305	61.90%	1,879	35.19%	155	2.90%			1,426	26.71%	5,339
Franklin	5,216	65.16%	2,606	32.55%	183	2.29%			2,610	32.60%	8,005
Geary	2,404	69.56%	962	27.84%	90	2.60%			1,442	41.72%	3,456
Gove	950	74.92%	285	22.48%	33	2.60%			665	52.44%	1,268
Graham	1,658	64.06%	762	29.44%	168	6.49%			896	34.62%	2,588
Grant	339	73.70%	108	23.48%	13	2.83%			231	50.22%	460
Gray	962	62.18%	507	32.77%	78	5.04%			455	29.41%	1,547
Greeley	273	69.47%	93	23.66%	27	6.87%			180	45.80%	393
Greenwood	3,422	68.34%	1,478	29.52%	107	2.14%			1,944	38.83%	5,007
Hamilton	591	57.66%	371	36.20%	63	6.15%			220	21.46%	1,025
Harper	2,593	61.65%	1,486	35.33%	127	3.02%			1,107	26.32%	4,206
Harvey	4,454	63.09%	2,457	34.80%	149	2.11%			1,997	28.29%	7,060
Haskell	444	69.59%	150	23.51%	44	6.90%			294	46.08%	638
Hodgeman	945	73.31%	306	23.74%	38	2.95%			639	49.57%	1,289
Jackson	3,753	70.20%	1,562	29.22%	31	0.58%			2,191	40.98%	5,346
Jefferson	3,463	68.86%	1,535	30.52%	31	0.62%			1,928	38.34%	5,029
Jewell	3,925	65.97%	1,899	31.92%	116	1.95%	10	0.17%	2,026	34.05%	5,950
Johnson	4,325	64.27%	2,303	34.22%	101	1.50%			2,022	30.05%	6,729
Kearny	617	63.74%	266	27.48%	85	8.78%			351	36.26%	968
Kingman	2,818	63.18%	1,557	34.91%	85	1.91%			1,261	28.27%	4,460
Kiowa	1,411	69.51%	587	28.92%	32	1.58%			824	40.59%	2,030
Labette	6,596	57.94%	4,328	38.02%	460	4.04%			2,268	19.92%	11,384
Lane	656	63.94%	298	29.04%	72	7.02%			358	34.89%	1,026
Leavenworth	6,846	65.05%	3,409	32.39%	269	2.56%			3,437	32.66%	10,524
Lincoln	2,298	69.51%	935	28.28%	73	2.21%			1,363	41.23%	3,306
Linn	3,189	62.84%	1,764	34.76%	122	2.40%			1,425	28.08%	5,075
Logan	781	68.51%	312	27.37%	45	3.95%	2	0.18%	469	41.14%	1,140
Lyon	5,492	61.09%	3,303	36.74%	195	2.17%			2,189	24.35%	8,990
Marion	3,840	65.82%	1,713	29.36%	281	4.82%			2,127	36.46%	5,834
Marshall	5,706	71.47%	2,026	25.38%	252	3.16%			3,680	46.09%	7,984
McPherson	4,870	69.50%	1,926	27.49%	211	3.01%			2,944	42.02%	7,007
Meade	1,236	70.95%	483	27.73%	23	1.32%			753	43.23%	1,742
Miami	4,060	60.92%	2,450	36.76%	154	2.31%			1,610	24.16%	6,664
Mitchell	3,310	68.32%	1,409	29.08%	126	2.60%			1,901	39.24%	4,845
Montgomery	10,044	62.21%	5,657	35.04%	444	2.75%			4,387	27.17%	16,145
Morris	3,001	66.19%	1,467	32.36%	66	1.46%			1,534	33.83%	4,534
Morton	783	72.97%	266	24.79%	24	2.24%			517	48.18%	1,073
Nemaha	4,655	72.32%	1,731	26.89%	51	0.79%			2,924	45.42%	6,437
Neosho	5,150	60.82%	3,195	37.73%	122	1.44%			1,955	23.09%	8,467
Ness	1,402	69.30%	492	24.32%	111	5.49%	18	0.89%	910	44.98%	2,023
Norton	2,288	65.24%	1,082	30.85%	137	3.91%			1,206	34.39%	3,507
Osage	4,507	62.80%	2,414	33.64%	256	3.57%			2,093	29.16%	7,177
Osborne	3,060	74.45%	980	23.84%	70	1.70%			2,080	50.61%	4,110
Ottawa	2,512	62.94%	1,358	34.03%	121	3.03%			1,154	28.92%	3,991
Pawnee	2,128	63.98%	1,138	34.22%	60	1.80%			990	29.77%	3,326
Phillips	2,862	68.60%	1,230	29.48%	80	1.92%			1,632	39.12%	4,172
Pottawatomie	4,481	76.95%	1,293	22.21%	49	0.84%			3,188	54.75%	5,823
Pratt	2,722	64.15%	1,433	33.77%	88	2.07%			1,289	30.38%	4,243
Rawlins	1,236	64.81%	495	25.96%	176	9.23%			741	38.86%	1,907
Reno	9,649	67.12%	4,385	30.50%	341	2.37%			5,264	36.62%	14,375
Republic	3,661	67.30%	1,672	30.74%	107	1.97%			1,989	36.56%	5,440
Rice	3,651	68.95%	1,532	28.93%	106	2.00%	6	0.11%	2,119	40.02%	5,295
Riley	4,875	73.57%	1,610	24.30%	141	2.13%			3,265	49.28%	6,626
Rooks	2,143	69.94%	843	27.51%	78	2.55%			1,300	42.43%	3,064
Rush	2,017	73.43%	605	22.02%	125	4.55%			1,412	51.40%	2,747
Russell	2,407	75.27%	724	22.64%	67	2.10%			1,683	52.63%	3,198
Saline	5,554	64.42%	2,808	32.57%	260	3.02%			2,746	31.85%	8,622
Scott	636	58.51%	379	34.87%	63	5.80%	9	0.83%	257	23.64%	1,087
Sedgwick	16,642	59.15%	10,998	39.09%	494	1.76%			5,644	20.06%	28,134
Seward	1,290	61.52%	722	34.43%	85	4.05%			568	27.09%	2,097
Shawnee	14,814	66.28%	7,217	32.29%	318	1.42%			7,597	33.99%	22,349
Sheridan	1,194	69.54%	477	27.78%	44	2.56%	2	0.12%	717	41.76%	1,717
Sherman	1,066	54.33%	789	40.21%	107	5.45%			277	14.12%	1,962
Smith	3,251	66.10%	1,535	31.21%	132	2.68%			1,716	34.89%	4,918
Stafford	2,779	70.04%	1,057	26.64%	132	3.33%			1,722	43.40%	3,968
Stanton	269	73.10%	89	24.18%	10	2.72%			180	48.91%	368
Stevens	876	69.47%	346	27.44%	39	3.09%			530	42.03%	1,261
Sumner	5,830	60.49%	3,454	35.84%	354	3.67%			2,376	24.65%	9,638
Thomas	1,046	54.56%	747	38.97%	124	6.47%			299	15.60%	1,917
Trego	1,299	75.04%	395	22.82%	37	2.14%			904	52.22%	1,731
Wabaunsee	2,859	77.63%	782	21.23%	42	1.14%			2,077	56.39%	3,683
Wallace	632	70.38%	203	22.61%	63	7.02%			429	47.77%	898
Washington	4,390	76.06%	1,287	22.30%	95	1.65%			3,103	53.76%	5,772
Wichita	422	73.91%	127	22.24%	22	3.85%			295	51.66%	571
Wilson	4,024	66.23%	1,768	29.10%	284	4.67%			2,256	37.13%	6,076
Woodson	2,253	68.71%	944	28.79%	82	2.50%			1,309	39.92%	3,279
Wyandotte	19,294	57.25%	13,737	40.76%	671	1.99%			5,557	16.49%	33,702
Totals	369,268	64.75%	185,464	32.52%	15,511	2.72%	75	0.01%	183,804	32.23%	570,318

== See also ==
- United States presidential elections in Kansas
