= Ingalls, Kansas =

City in Gray County, Kansas

- City
- Location within Gray County and Kansas

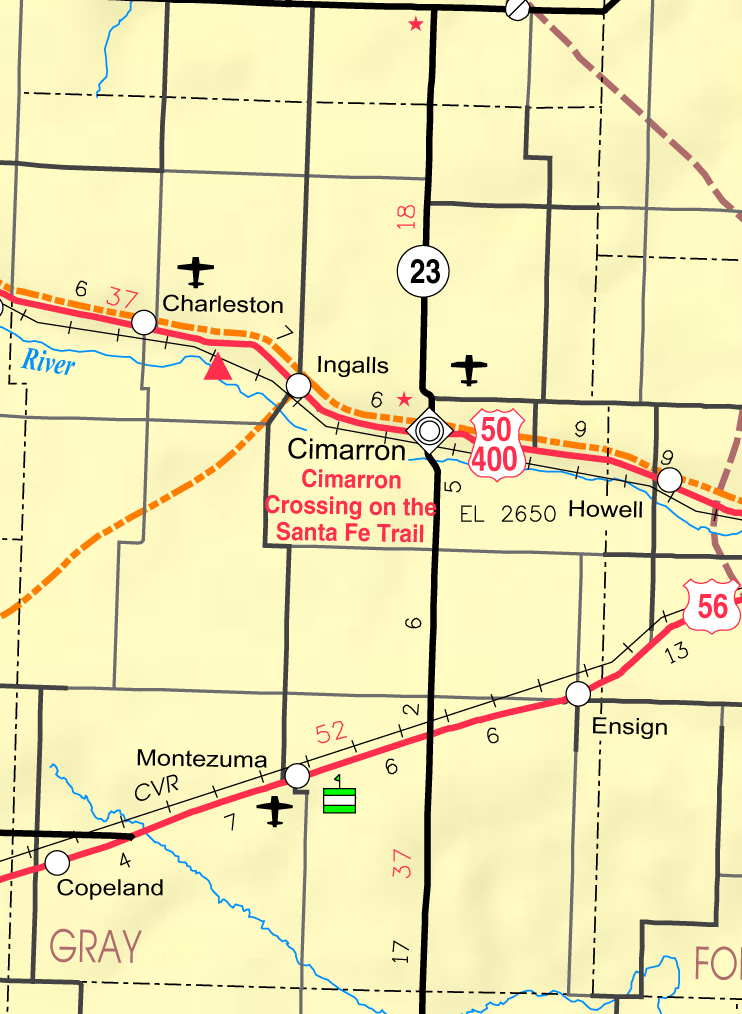
- KDOT map of Gray County (legend)
- Coordinates: 37°49′43″N 100°27′12″W
- Country: United States
- State: Kansas
- County: Gray
- Founded: 1880s
- Incorporated: 1929
- Named for: John Ingalls

Government
  - Mayor: Leonard Rodenbur

Area
  - Total: 0.25 sq mi (0.66 km^{2})
  - Land: 0.25 sq mi (0.66 km^{2})
  - Water: 0 sq mi (0.00 km^{2})
- Elevation: 2,681 ft (817 m)

Population (2020)
  - Total: 252
  - Density: 990/sq mi (380/km^{2})
- Time zone: UTC-6 (CST)
  - Summer (DST): UTC-5 (CDT)
- ZIP Code: 67853
- Area code: 620
- FIPS code: 20-34225
- GNIS ID: 2395426
- Website: cityofingalls.com

Ingalls is a city in Gray County, Kansas, United States. As of the 2020 census, the population of the city was 252. It is located along Highway 50.

== History ==
The first post office was established in May 1887 with the name Soule until May 1888. The community was renamed for Kansas senator John James Ingalls.

Ingalls was a candidate for county seat in the late 1880s, and once held the county offices.

== Geography ==
According to the United States Census Bureau, the city has a total area of 0.26 square miles (0.67 km^{2}), all land.

== Demographics ==
Historical population
Census	Pop.	Note	%±
1930	273		—
1940	187		−31.5%
1950	173		−7.5%
1960	174		0.6%
1970	235		35.1%
1980	274		16.6%
1990	301		9.9%
2000	328		9.0%
2010	306		−6.7%
2020	252		−17.6%
U.S. Decennial Census

=== 2020 census ===
The 2020 United States census counted 252 people, 97 households, and 71 families in Ingalls. The population density was 969.2 per square mile (374.2/km^{2}). There were 111 housing units at an average density of 426.9 units per square mile (164.8 units/km^{2}). The racial makeup was 78.17% (197) white or European American (64.68% non-Hispanic white), 1.59% (4) black or African-American, 0.4% (1) Native American or Alaska Native, 0.79% (2) Asian, 0.0% (0) Pacific Islander or Native Hawaiian, 10.71% (27) from other races, and 8.33% (21) from two or more races. Hispanic or Latino of any race was 30.16% (76) of the population.

Of the 97 households, 44.3% had children under the age of 18; 61.9% were married couples living together; 18.6% had a female householder with no spouse or partner present. 23.7% of households consisted of individuals and 9.3% had someone living alone who was 65 years of age or older. The average household size was 3.1 and the average family size was 3.9. The percent of those with a bachelor's degree or higher was estimated to be 9.1% of the population.

32.1% of the population was under the age of 18, 6.3% from 18 to 24, 24.6% from 25 to 44, 27.4% from 45 to 64, and 9.5% who were 65 years of age or older. The median age was 32.6 years. For every 100 females, there were 92.4 males. For every 100 females ages 18 and older, there were 101.2 males.

The 2016–2020 5-year American Community Survey estimates show that the median household income was $62,188 (with a margin of error of +/- $6,664) and the median family income was $66,563 (+/- $21,273). Males had a median income of $39,583 (+/- $17,874) versus $25,833 (+/- $18,323) for females. The median income for those above 16 years old was $31,450 (+/- $5,652). Approximately, 0.0% of families and 0.0% of the population were below the poverty line, including 0.0% of those under the age of 18 and 0.0% of those ages 65 or over.

=== 2010 census ===
As of the census of 2010, there were 306 people, 113 households, and 87 families residing in the city. The population density was 1,176.9 inhabitants per square mile (454.4/km^{2}). There were 121 housing units at an average density of 465.4 units per square mile (179.7 units/km^{2}). The racial makeup of the city was 87.3% White, 0.3% African American, 0.3% Asian, 11.4% from other races, and 0.7% from two or more races. Hispanic or Latino of any race were 22.5% of the population.

There were 113 households, of which 41.6% had children under the age of 18 living with them, 62.8% were married couples living together, 7.1% had a female householder with no husband present, 7.1% had a male householder with no wife present, and 23.0% were non-families. 19.5% of all households were made up of individuals, and 5.3% had someone living alone who was 65 years of age or older. The average household size was 2.71 and the average family size was 3.10.

The median age in the city was 32.3 years. 27.1% of residents were under the age of 18; 12.2% were between the ages of 18 and 24; 29% were from 25 to 44; 22.6% were from 45 to 64; and 9.2% were 65 years of age or older. The gender makeup of the city was 50.3% male and 49.7% female.

== Education ==
The community is served by Ingalls USD 477 public school district. The Ingalls High School mascot is Bulldogs.
