= Appleton Township, Kansas =

Appleton Township
- Township
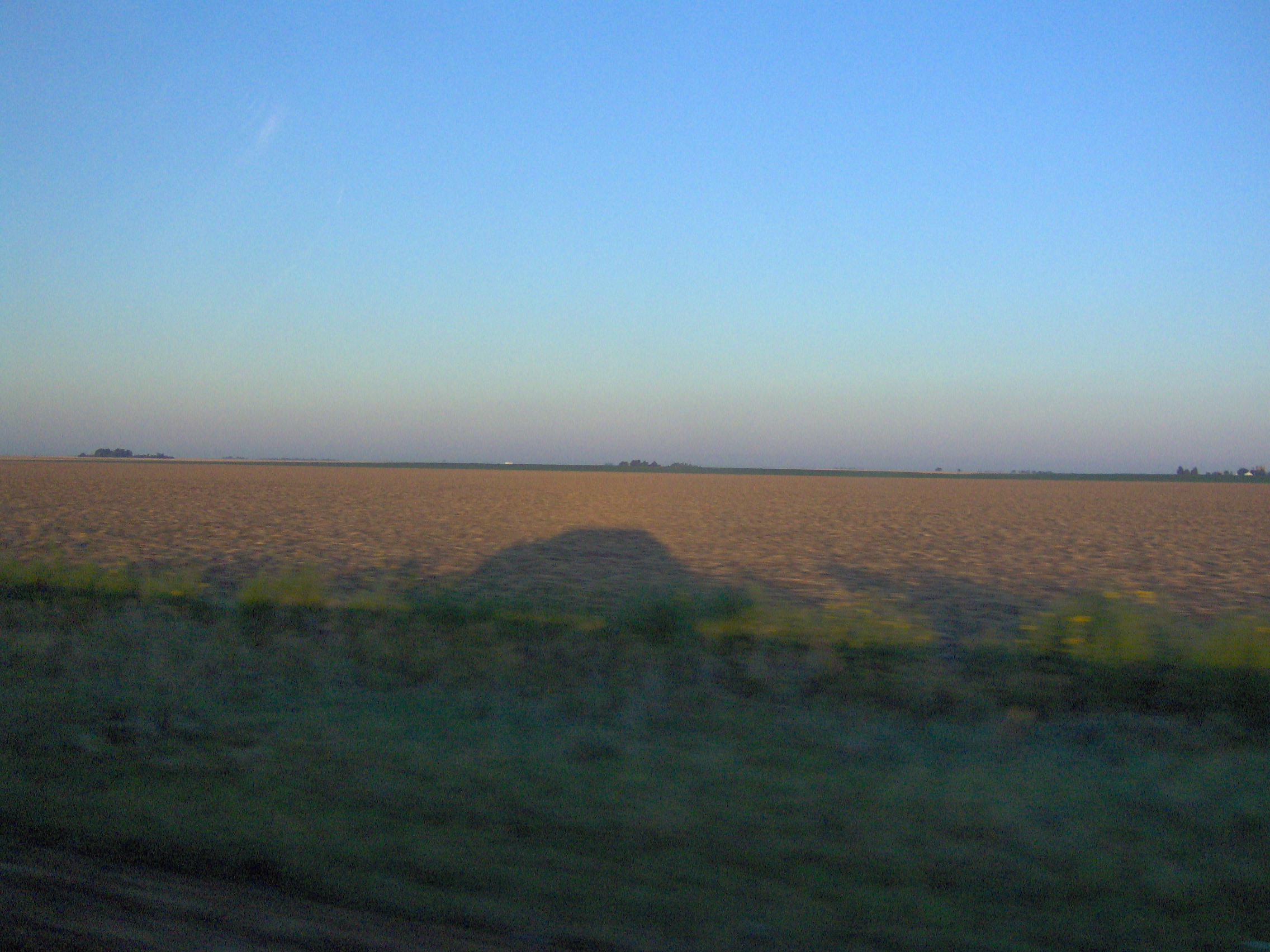
- Countryside in Appleton Township near Minneola (2006)

- Location in Clark County
- Coordinates: 37°23′00″N 099°51′31″W
- Country: United States
- State: Kansas
- County: Clark

Area
  - Total: 243.9 sq mi (631.7 km^{2})
  - Land: 243.20 sq mi (629.89 km^{2})
  - Water: 0.70 sq mi (1.81 km^{2}) 0.29%
- Elevation: 2,539 ft (774 m)

Population (2020)
  - Total: 912
  - Density: 3.75/sq mi (1.45/km^{2})
- GNIS feature ID: 0470721

Appleton Township is a township in Clark County, Kansas, United States. As of the 2020 census, its population was 912.

== Geography ==
Appleton Township covers an area of 243.9 square miles (632 km^{2}) and contains one incorporated settlement, Minneola. According to the USGS, it contains one cemetery, Minneola.

The streams of Brites Creek, Hackberry Creek, Hargis Creek and Simmons Creek run through this township.

== Transportation ==
Appleton Township contains one airport or landing strip, Kennedy Glider Port.
