= East Hess Township, Kansas =

East Hess Township
- Township
- Location in Gray County
- Coordinates: 37°36′00″N 100°16′02″W
- Country: United States
- State: Kansas
- County: Gray

Area
  - Total: 108.4 sq mi (280.8 km^{2})
  - Land: 108.39 sq mi (280.72 km^{2})
  - Water: 0.031 sq mi (0.08 km^{2}) 0.03%
- Elevation: 2,753 ft (839 m)

Population (2020)
  - Total: 335
  - Density: 3.09/sq mi (1.19/km^{2})
- GNIS feature ID: 0470575

East Hess Township is a township in Gray County, Kansas, United States. As of the 2020 census, its population was 335.

== Geography ==
East Hess Township covers an area of 108.42 square miles (280.8 km^{2}) and contains one incorporated settlement, Ensign. According to the USGS, it contains three cemeteries: Cave, Ensign and Johnson.
