= Department of the Missouri =

Defunct American military command

The Department of the Missouri was a command echelon of the United States Army in the 19th century and a sub division of the Military Division of the Missouri that functioned through the Indian Wars.

== History ==
=== Background ===
Following the successful conclusion of the Mexican–American War, the administration of the United States Army was theoretically directed, under the President of the United States, by the Secretary of War and the general in chief. In practice the Secretary of War and the heads of the army's staff agencies—who reported directly to him (adjutant general, quartermaster general, commissary general, inspector general, paymaster general, surgeon general, chief engineer, colonel of topographical engineers, and colonel of ordnance)—exercised full authority, leaving the general-in-chief a figurehead. With a lack of central direction, policy and strategy were de facto developed by the commanders of the numbered geographical departments and three division headquarters. After October 31, 1853 the division echelon was eliminated and the six western departments consolidated into four (Departments of Texas, New Mexico, the West, and the Pacific), whose department commanders employed their troops as they saw fit. The system returned to six departments in 1858 when the Department of Utah was created in January, and the Department of the Pacific split into the Departments of California and Oregon in September.

Military activity affecting one department often originated in another department, preventing efficient use of limited manpower and coordination of efforts. Friction between the Secretaries of War and the generals in chief, and particularly between Jefferson Davis and Winfield Scott, obstructed reforms in the staff system that might have brought unity of command and civilian control of the military. The expansion of the army during the Civil War saw a proliferation in the numbers of geographic departments and their subordinate districts, often changing names and areas under their individual control, some departments eliminated or renamed, only to be recreated again in altered form.

=== Departments of the Missouri and Kansas ===
The Department of Missouri resulted from the reorganization and breakup of the Department of the West on November 9, 1861, after Abraham Lincoln fired John C. Frémont when he would not rescind his order emancipating the slaves of Missouri and imposing martial law on the state. David Hunter served briefly as the last commander Department of the West. The new department included Missouri, Arkansas, Illinois, Kentucky west of the Cumberland River and at times, Kansas. It briefly merged with the Department of Mississippi in 1862, but was recreated September 19, now consisting of Missouri, Arkansas, Kansas, and the Indian Territory. Colorado and Nebraska were added on October 11, 1862, and the department became generally known as the Department of the Missouri. From 1862 to 1865 the department was primarily concerned with fighting Confederates in Missouri and Arkansas.

The Department of Kansas was created for a third time on January 1, 1864, removing major areas from the military jurisdiction of the Department of the Missouri. The new commander of the Department of Kansas, Maj. Gen. Samuel R. Curtis, had two districts (Colorado and Nebraska) wholly involved in Indian warfare, but Curtis was absorbed with fighting Confederates in the Indian Territory and bushwhackers in Kansas, allowing his other districts, particularly Colorado, complete autonomy. Governor John Evans and Colorado district commander Col. John M. Chivington took advantage of this lack of oversight to aggressively attack Cheyenne villages in April 1864, igniting a major Indian war in July. Curtis created a new District of the Upper Arkansas to wage the war, but he was wholly incapable of locating his opponents. In his other District of Nebraska, the warfare was even more intense, but the forces there too weak to deal with it.

== Commanders ==
Commanders of the Department of the Missouri included:

=== Civil War ===
- Henry W. Halleck (November 19, 1861 to March 11, 1862)
- Samuel R. Curtis (September 24, 1862 to May 24, 1863)
- John M. Schofield (May 24, 1863 to January 30, 1864)
- William S. Rosecrans (January 30, 1864 to December 9, 1864)
- Grenville M. Dodge (December 9, 1864 to June 27, 1865)
- John Pope (June 27, 1865 to 1866)

=== Indian Wars ===
- Winfield Scott Hancock (1866–1867)
- Philip Sheridan (1867–1869)
- John Schofield (1869–1870)
- John Pope (1870–1883)
- Christopher Columbus Augur (1883–1885)
- Joseph H. Potter (1886)
- Orlando B. Willcox (1886–1887)
- Wesley Merritt (1887–1891)
- Nelson A. Miles (1891–1894)
- Thomas H. Ruger (1894–1895)
- Wesley Merritt (1895–1897)

=== Spanish–American War ===
- John R. Brooke (1897–1898)
- John J. Coppinger (1898–1900)
- Fitzhugh Lee (1900–1901)
- Henry C. Merriam (1901)
- John C. Bates (1901–1903)
- Camillo C. C. Carr (1904)
- Theodore J. Wint (1904–1906)
- Adolphus Greely (1906–1907)
- Earl D. Thomas (1907)
- Charles Morton (1907–1908)
- William Harding Carter (1908–1909)
- Frederick Appleton Smith (1910–1913)
- Command discontinued after 1913

== Department of Missouri Camps, Forts and Posts ==
=== Arkansas ===
- Fort Smith

=== Kansas ===
- Bear Creek Redoubt (1870–1878)
- Big Creek Station (1865–1867)+
- Carlysle Station (1865–1866)+
- Camp Caldwell (1884–1885)
- Camp Crawford (1868)
- Crisfield Post (1885)
- Camp Drywood (1871)
- Camp Grierson (1866)
- Camp Hoffman (1867)
- Camp Kirwin (1865)
- Camp Ogallah (1867)
- Camp Pliley (1869–1870?)
- Camp Wichita (1868–1869)
- Chalk Bluffs Station (1865–1867)+
- Castle Rock Creek Station (1865–1867)+
- Cimarron Redoubt (1870–1876)
- Cimarron Springs Station (1864–1873)
- Fort Aubrey (1865–1866)
- Fort Bissell (1873–1878)
- Fort Coon (1868)
- Fort Dodge (1865–1882)
- Fort Downer or Downer's Station (1867–1868)
- Fort Harker (1866–1872)
- Fort Hays (1865–1889)
- Fort Jewell (1870)
- Fort Larned (1859–1878)
- Fort Leavenworth (1827–present)
- Fort Lincoln (1861–1879)
- Fort Lookout (1866–1870s)
- Fort Monument (1865–1868)
- Fort Protection (1885)
- Fort Riley (1853–present)
- Post of Southeastern Kansas (1869–1873)
- Fort Solomon (1864–1865)
- Fort Montgomery (1861–1869)
- Fort Wallace (1865–1882)
- Fort Zarah (1864–1869)
- Grinnell Springs Station (1865–1867)+
- Henshaw's Station (1865–1867)+
- Lookout Station or Fort Lookout (1866–1868)
- Monument Springs Post (1865–1867)
- Pond Creek Station (1865–1866)+
- Russell Springs Station (1865–1866)+
- New Kiowa Post (1885)
- Smoky Hill Station (1865–1867)+
- + Army fortified Butterfield Stage stations along the Smoky Hill River route.

=== Missouri ===
- St. Louis Arsenal (1827–1904)
- Jefferson Barracks (1826–1871, 1894–1946)

=== Indian Territory and Territory of Oklahoma ===
- Camp Alice (1883)
- Camp Auger (1873–1874)
- Camp Beach or Fort Beach or Fort Otter or Camp Otter (1874)
- Camp Chilocco (1885)
- Camp Guthrie (1889–1891)
- Camp Oklahoma (1889)
- Camp Price (1889)
- Camp at Purcell (1889)
- Camp Rockwell (1888)
- Camp Russell (1884–1886)
- Camp Wade or Camp at Kingfisher (1889)
- Cantonment on the North Fork of the Canadian River (1879–1882, 1885)
- Fort Arbuckle (1851–1870)
- Fort Cobb (1859–1862, 1868–1869)
- Camp Davidson (1878–1882)
- Fort Gibson (1824–1901)
- Fort Reno (1875–1948)
- Fort Sill (1869–present)
- Depot on the North Fork Canadian River and Camp Supply (1868–1878)
  - Fort Supply (1878–1894)
- Sewell's Stockade (1870s)
- Sheridan's Roost (1870)

== Sources ==
- Robert W. Frazer, Forts of the West: Military Forts and Presidios, and Posts Commonly Called Forts, West of the Mississippi River to 1898 (Norman: University of Oklahoma Press, 1965).
- Raphael P. Thian, Notes Illustrating the Military Geography of the United States, 1813-1880 (Washington, D.C.: Government Printing Office, 1881; reprinted Austin, TX: University of Texas Press, 1979).
- Francis Paul Prucha, A Guide to the Military Posts of the United States, 1789-1895 (Madison: State Historical Society of Wisconsin, 1964).
- Utley, Robert M. (1967). Frontiersmen in Blue: The United States Army and the Indian, 1848-1865. University of Nebraska Press. ISBN 978-0-8032-9550-6.
- The Civil War Day by Day: An Almanac, 1861–1865, by E.B. Long with Barbara Long, 1985, Da Capo Press, ISBN 0-306-80255-4, page 138
