= Glen H. Thomas =

American architect (1889–1962)

- Born: July 9, 1889; Waterville, Kansas
- Died: November 19, 1962 (aged 73); Wichita, Kansas
- Occupation: Architect
- Awards: Fellow, American Institute of Architects (1957)
- Practice: Glen H. Thomas; Thomas & Harris; Thomas–Harris–Calvin & Associates

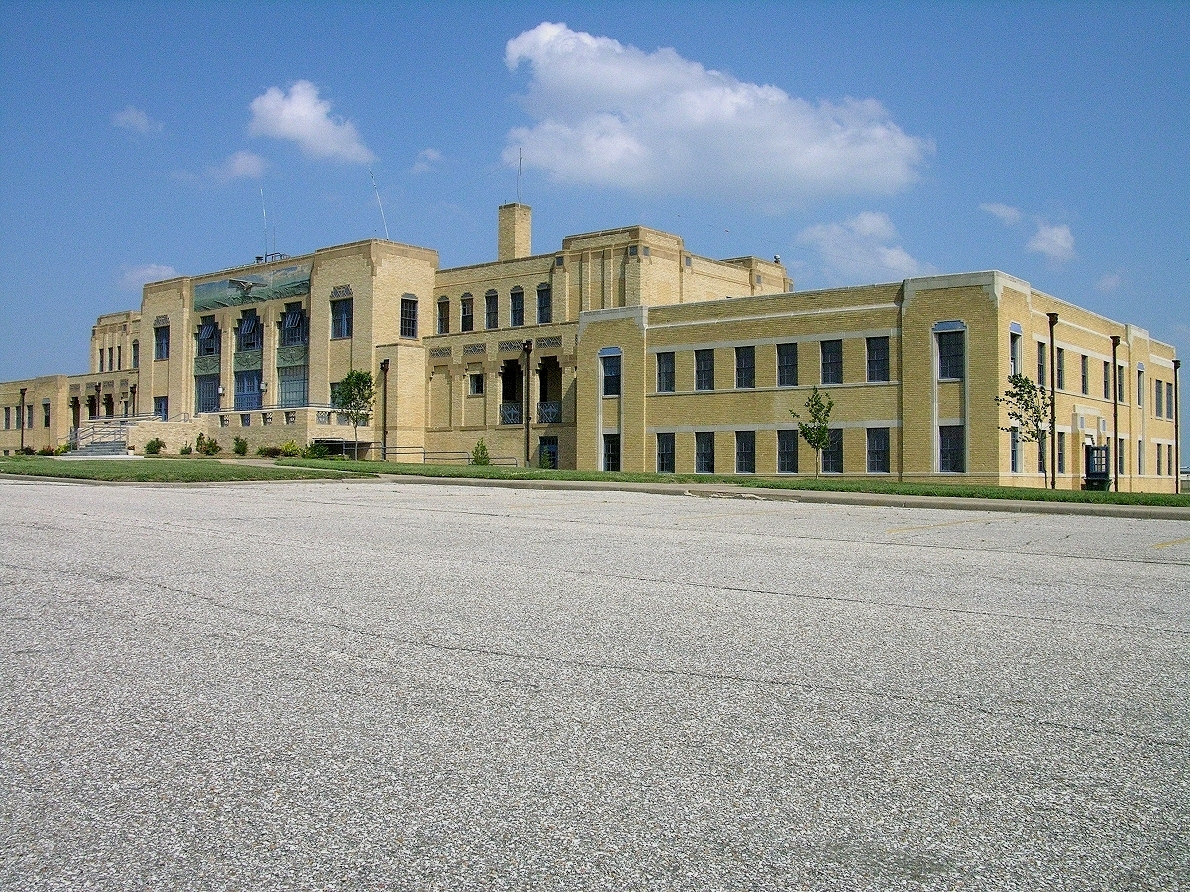
The terminal of the former Wichita Municipal Airport, now the Kansas Aviation Museum, designed by Glen H. Thomas and completed in 1935.

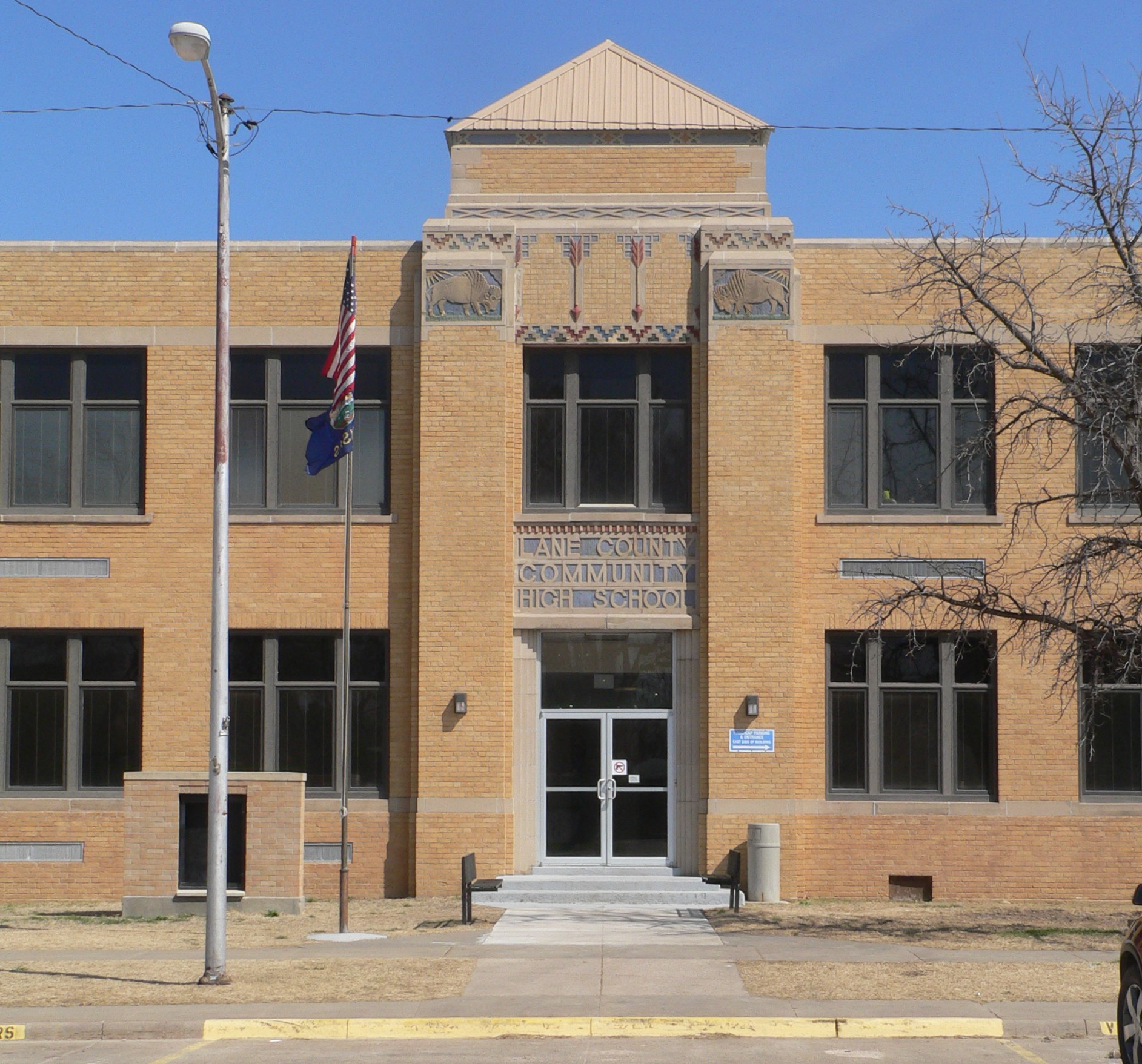
The Dighton High School, designed by Thomas and completed in 1938.

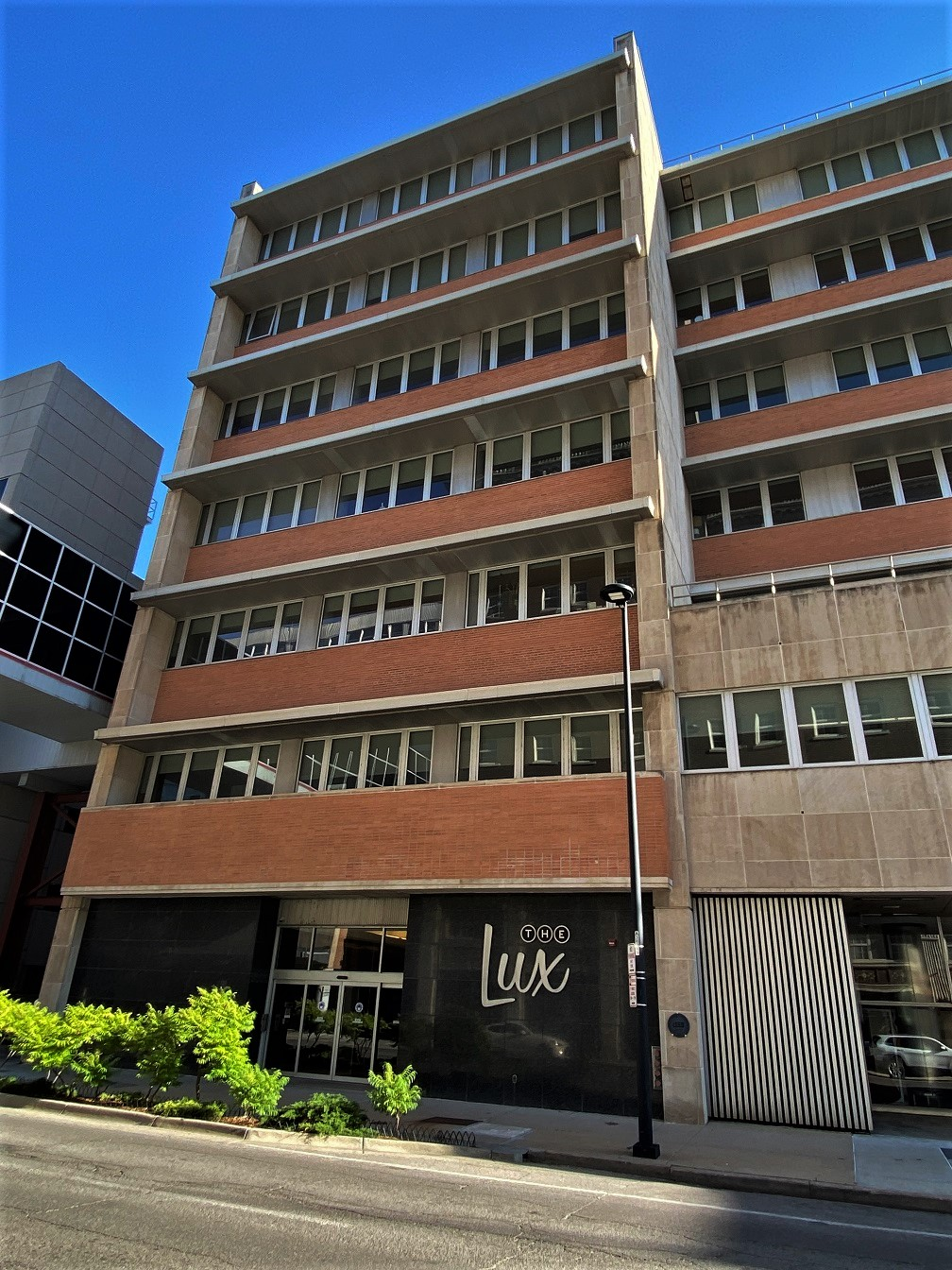
The Kansas Gas & Electric Company Building in Wichita, Designed by Thomas & Harris and completed in 1953.

Glen H. Thomas FAIA (July 9, 1889 – November 19, 1962) was an American architect in practice in Wichita, Kansas from 1919 until his death in 1962. The firm Thomas founded in 1919 celebrated its hundreth anniversary in 2019 and now (2024) is known as TESSERE.

== Life and career ==
Glen Herbert Thomas was born July 9, 1889, in Waterville, Kansas to Courtney Glendure Thomas and Alice Elizabeth Thomas, née Farwell. He was educated at the University of Illinois, but did not earn a degree. In 1916 he moved to Wichita, where he joined the office of Lorentz Schmidt FAIA. He served briefly in the army during World War I but otherwise remained with Schmidt until 1919, when he opened an independent office.

In 1944 he formed the partnership of Thomas & Harris with Arthur B. Harris AIA, an employee since 1920. In 1953 the partnership was reorganized as Thomas–Harris–Calvin & Associates to reflect the addition of Roy E. Calvin Jr. AIA, an employee since 1946. Harris died in 1957, and the partnership was expanded to include electrical engineer Glen C. Thomas and architect Robert B. Harris AIA, sons of Thomas and Harris. Thomas was senior partner of the firm until his death in 1962.

Thomas was a member of the Wichita City Planning Commission from 1927 to 1938 and from 1940 to 1945 and was chair of the Sedgwick County Planning Commission from 1951 to 1958. He joined the American Institute of Architects (AIA) in 1929 as a member of the Kansas chapter and was elected a Fellow in 1957 is recognition of his public service and for his service to the AIA.

== Legacy ==
After his death, Thomas' firm was continued by his partners. With more partnership changes, the firm was changed to Thomas, Harris & Ash in 1964 and to Thomas, Harris, Ash & Mason in 1968. In 1978 it was incorporated as Thomas Harris Ash & Mason PA, which was changed to THAM Associates PA in 1983. In 1988 it merged with Planning Development Services Inc. to form Oblinger, Mason, McCluggage & Van Sickle. This changed to McCluggage, Van Sickle & Perry in 1994, which merged in 2010 with Gossen Livingston Associates to form GLMV Architecture Inc. The combined firm considers Thomas to be its founder and celebrated its hundreth anniversary in 2019. In 2024 the name was changed again to TESSERE.

At least eight buildings designed by Thomas and his partners have been listed on the United States National Register of Historic Places.

== Personal life ==
Thomas was married in 1919 to Onus Pearl Deichman. They had two children, Glen Courtney and Jane Louise. Thomas died November 19, 1962 at the age of 73.

== Architectural works ==
=== Glen H. Thomas, 1919–1944 ===
- 1923 – Hotel Broadview, 110 W 6th Ave, Emporia, Kansas
- 1923 – Western Newspaper Union Building, 201 S St Francis Ave, Wichita, Kansas
- 1929 – Stackman Court Apartments, (Note: NRHP-listed.) 1207 Franklin Ave, Wichita, Kansas
- 1929 – Wichita North High School, 1437 N Rochester St, Wichita, Kansas
- 1930 – Allen's Market, 2938 E. Douglas Ave, Wichita, Kansas
- 1931 – Field Kindley High School, 1110 W 8th St, Coffeyville, Kansas
- 1935 – Eugene Ware Elementary School, 900 E. 3rd St, Fort Scott, Kansas
- 1935 – Wichita Municipal Airport terminal (former), Wichita, Kansas
- 1937 – Ashland Elementary School, 210 W. 7th St, Ashland, Kansas
- 1938 – Dighton High School, 200 S. Wichita Ave, Dighton, Kansas

=== Thomas & Harris, 1944–1953 ===
- 1949 – St. Patrick Catholic Church, 2007 N Arkansas Ave, Wichita, Kansas
- 1951 – Clark County Courthouse, 913 Highland St, Ashland, Kansas
- 1953 – Kansas Gas & Electric Company Building, 120 E 1st St N, Wichita, Kansas
- 1953 – Wichita West High School, 820 S Osage St Wichita, Kansas

=== Thomas–Harris–Calvin & Associates, 1953–1964 ===
- 1954 – Smoky Valley High School, 1 Viking Blvd, Lindsborg, Kansas
- 1954 – Wichita Dwight D. Eisenhower National Airport terminal, (Note: Demolished.) Wichita, Kansas
- 1955 – Nemaha County Courthouse, 607 Nemaha St, Seneca, Kansas
- 1956 – Sedgwick County Courthouse, 525 N Main St, Wichita, Kansas
- 1958 – Fourth National Bank Building, 100–110 N Market St, Wichita, Kansas
