= Clark County Courthouse (Kansas) =

- Location within Kansas Location within the United States

General information
- Architectural style: Modern
- Location: 913 Highland Street, Ashland, Kansas
- Coordinates: 37°11′12″N 99°46′3″W
- Construction started: 1950
- Completed: 1951

Design and construction
- Architect: Thomas & Harris
- Main contractor: D. C. Bass & Sons

The Clark County Courthouse, located at 913 Highland Street in Ashland, is the seat of government of Clark County, Kansas. Ashland has been the county seat since 1885. The courthouse was built from 1950 to 1951 by contractor D. C. Bass & Sons of Enid, Oklahoma.

Architects Thomas & Harris of Wichita, Kansas designed the courthouse in the Modern style. The courthouse is two stories and faces east. It is constructed of buff-colored brick, stone, and concrete with a flat roof. The entrance projects from the southern end of the east side of the building and is decorated with a carved map of the county, showing the townships, towns, and other points of interest in the county.

The current courthouse is the second structure used as a courthouse. The first courthouse was built in 1888 by J. M. Anderson and designed by W. R. Parsons & Son. It was significantly remodeled and enlarged in 1932.

The first Clark County Courthouse was located at Clark City (1867-1884), which was located about one and one-half miles from Ashland. Clark City had become a ghost town, thus the need to move the county seat.

== See also ==
- List of county courthouses in Kansas
