= Alexander & Anna Schwartz Farm =

- U.S. National Register of Historic Places
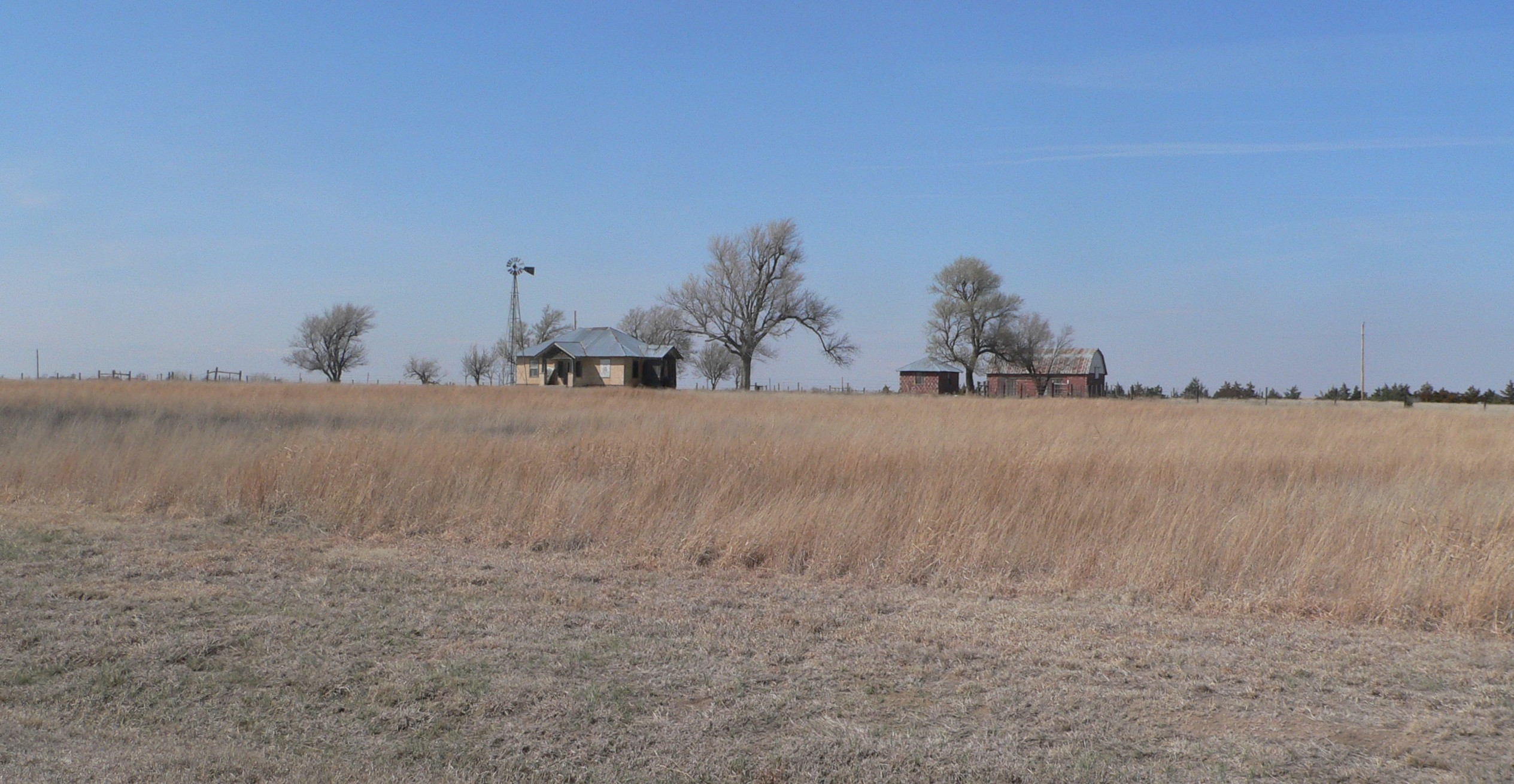

- Location within Kansas Location within the United States
- Location: 57 E. Rd. 70, Dighton, Kansas
- Coordinates: 38°21′57″N 100°21′33″W
- Built: c.1928
- NRHP reference No.: 14000829
- Added to NRHP: October 8, 2014

The Alexander & Anna Schwartz Farm, located at 57 E. Rd. 70 in Dighton, Kansas, was listed on the National Register of Historic Places in 2014.

It includes three buildings (a craftsman-style house built c.1928, a barn, and a smokehouse/cellar) and an Aermotor windmill. The house is built of structural hollow clay tile, also known as structural terra cotta.

== History ==
In 1906, Alexander and Anna Schwartz moved from Russia with their young family, and settled in Kansas. They initially lived in Russell, then moved to Rush County, then Ness County. In 1928, seeking land suitable for cattle grazing, Alexander traded his plot in Ness County for the 200-acre plot which became the Alexander and Anna Schwartz Farm. The family built the buildings on the property from hollow clay tile bricks.

The property is still owned by the Schwartz family.
