= Ashland Elementary School =

Ashland Elementary School may refer to:

- Ashland Elementary School (Kansas), United States
- Ashland Elementary School, Alabama, United States — Clay County School District (Alabama)
- Ashland Elementary School, Missouri, United States — St. Louis Public Schools
- Ashland Elementary School (K-8), New Hampshire, United States
- Ashland Elementary School, Kentucky, United States — Fayette County Public Schools
