= Ashland USD 220 =

Public school district in Ashland, Kansas

Address
- 311 JE Humphreys St. Ashland, Kansas, 67831; United States
- Coordinates: 37°11′39″N 99°46′31″W

District information
- Type: Public
- Grades: K to 12
- Schools: 1

Other information
- Website: usd220.net

Ashland Junior/Senior High School

Location
- 311 J.E. Humphreys Street; Ashland, (Clark County), Kansas 67831; United States

Information
- Type: Public high school
- Principal: Heidi Hazen
- Staff: 4.77 (FTE)
- Enrollment: 74 (2023-24)
- Student to teacher ratio: 15.51
- Colors: Blue and white
- Nickname: Blue Jays
- Website: Ashland High School

Ashland USD 220 is a public unified school district headquartered in Ashland, Kansas, United States. The district includes the communities of Ashland, Englewood, Sitka, and nearby rural areas.

== Schools ==
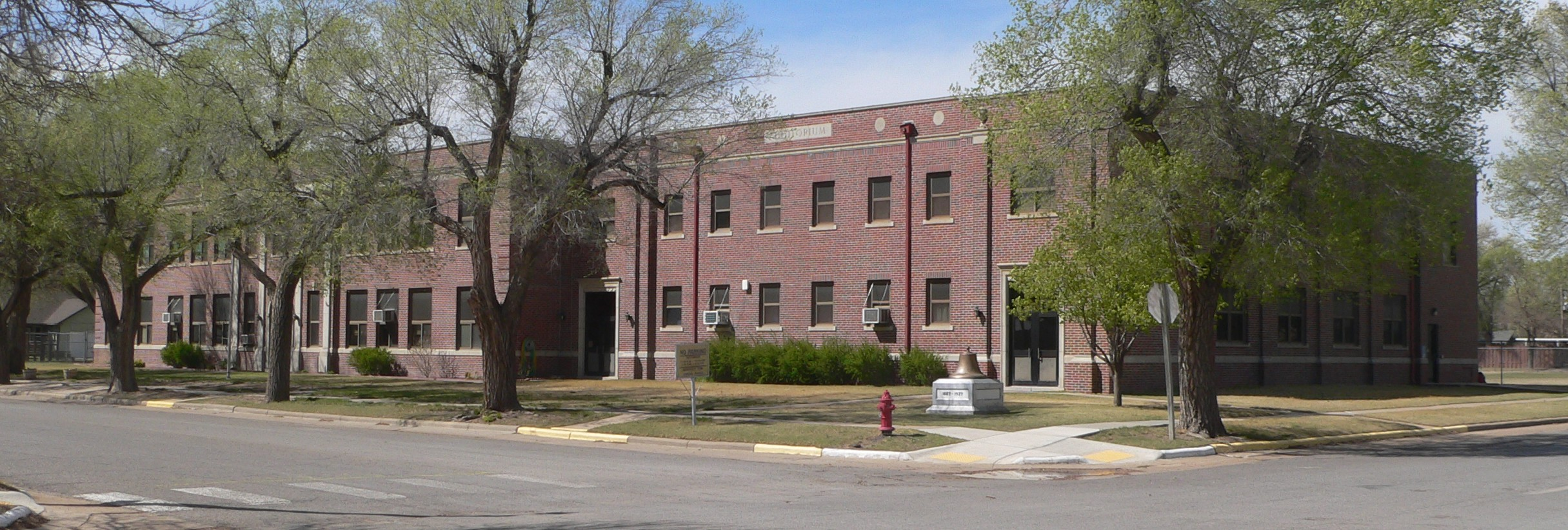
Ashland Elementary School (Ashland Grade School)

The school district operates the following schools:

- Ashland Junior/Senior High School.
- Ashland Elementary School. (Closed April 21, 2025)

== History ==
Brian Pekarek served as the superintendent and principal from circa 2013-2014 until circa 2015–2016. Calvin Jones served as the superintendent and principal for the 2015–2016 school year.

The high school is ranked as division 1A by the Kansas athletic association.

On April 21, 2025, the grade school ceased teaching operations, with all students moving to Ashland Junior/Senior High School for education starting in the 2025/2026 school year. The grade school gymnasium continues to be used.

== See also ==
- Kansas State Department of Education
- Kansas State High School Activities Association
- List of high schools in Kansas
- List of unified school districts in Kansas
