= Center Township, Clark County, Kansas =

Center Township
- Township
- Location in Clark County
- Coordinates: 37°11′20″N 099°48′41″W
- Country: United States
- State: Kansas
- County: Clark

Area
  - Total: 204.56 sq mi (529.82 km^{2})
  - Land: 203.93 sq mi (528.17 km^{2})
  - Water: 0.63 sq mi (1.64 km^{2}) 0.31%
- Elevation: 2,005 ft (611 m)

Population (2020)
  - Total: 867
  - Density: 4.25/sq mi (1.64/km^{2})
- GNIS feature ID: 0470813

Center Township is a township in Clark County, Kansas, United States. As of the 2020 census, its population was 867.

== History ==
The Cimarron Redoubt, an Army fortification built in 1870, is located along Clark Creek (Redoubt Creek) south of its confluence with the Cimarron River, in southern Clark Township.

== Geography ==
Center Township covers an area of 204.56 square miles (529.8 km^{2}) and contains one incorporated settlement, Ashland (the county seat). According to the USGS, it contains one cemetery, Saint Josephs and Highland.

The streams of Big Sandy Creek, Bullard Creek, Casino Creek, East Branch Bear Creek, Keiger Creek, Little Sandy Creek, Redhole Creek, Redoubt Creek, Spring Creek, Stink Creek and West Branch Bear Creek run through this township.

== Transportation ==
Center Township contains one airport or landing strip, Harold Krier Field.
