= Englewood Township =

Englewood Township may refer to the following townships in the United States:

- Englewood Township, Clark County, Kansas
- Englewood Township, New Jersey, in Bergen County
