= Lexington, Kansas =

Ghost town in Clark County, Kansas

Coordinates: 37°17′38″N 99°35′58″W

Lexington is a ghost town in Lexington Township, Clark County, Kansas, United States.

== History ==
A post office was established in Lexington in the 1880s, and remained in operation until it was discontinued in 1927.
