= Liberty Township, Clark County, Kansas =

Liberty Township
- Township
- Location in Clark County
- Coordinates: 37°25′45″N 099°40′56″W
- Country: United States
- State: Kansas
- County: Clark

Area
  - Total: 59.83 sq mi (154.96 km^{2})
  - Land: 59.80 sq mi (154.88 km^{2})
  - Water: 0.031 sq mi (0.08 km^{2}) 0.05%
- Elevation: 2,372 ft (723 m)

Population (2020)
  - Total: 13
  - Density: 0.22/sq mi (0.084/km^{2})
- GNIS feature ID: 0470700

Liberty Township is a township in Clark County, Kansas, United States. As of the 2020 census, its population was 13.

== Geography ==
Liberty Township covers an area of 59.83 square miles (155.0 km^{2}) and contains no incorporated settlements.
