= Cimarron Redoubt =

- U.S. National Register of Historic Places
- Location within Kansas Location within the United States
- Location: Along Clark Creek in southern Center Township, Clark County, Kansas
- Nearest city: Ashland
- Coordinates: 37°1′47.9″N 99°45′47.5″W
- Area: 6 acres (2.4 ha)
- Built: 1870
- Architect: John Page
- NRHP reference No.: 78001276
- Added to NRHP: May 23, 1978

The Cimarron Redoubt (also known as the Deep Hole Redoubt) was an improvised U.S. Army fortification south of the city of Ashland in Clark County, Kansas, United States. Built in 1870 near a major trade route's crossing of the Cimarron River, it was later used for a variety of civilian purposes, including a post office. Today, it lies abandoned amid farm fields in southern Center Township.

== History ==
Southwestern Kansas was the location of some of the fighting of the Comanche War, fought between 1867 and 1875. In order to protect traffic on the Fort Supply/Fort Dodge trail, U.S. Army soldiers built two redoubts north and south of the Cimarron River. The southern redoubt, constructed of sandbags, was erected on the eastern side of Clark Creek south of its confluence with the Cimarron, while the earthen northern redoubt was built along the eastern side of Bear Creek. Named for the streams along which they lie, the two sites are located approximately fourteen miles apart: the Cimarron Redoubt lies nine miles south of Ashland, while the Bear Creek Redoubt lies five miles to the north of the city.

Although fighting concluded in the immediate vicinity of the redoubt by 1875, it and the Bear Creek redoubt remained necessary fortifications in the Army's strategy of keeping hostile Native Americans away from settled areas. By the late 1870s, the region was sufficiently peaceful to render the Cimarron Redoubt unnecessary, and it was left to use by local civilians. The next few years saw it converted into a store, and by 1881, it was the location of the Deep Hole post office. After an undetermined period of time, it was abandoned. Since that time, the redoubt has been remarkably well preserved: the tall grass that now covers it has significantly reduced the rate of erosion. Located in the middle of a field now used for the storage of hay, the grass-covered redoubt is Kansas' only known sandbag fort.

In 1978, the Cimarron Redoubt's excellent state of preservation led to its being placed on the National Register of Historic Places, both for its historical role in military affairs and for the potential archeological value of excavation. The areas recognized as significant include both the fortification and some surrounding fields. Moreover, the National Park Service has recognized the redoubt as one of the principal sites in the valley of the Cimarron River.

== Structure ==
Built by soldiers under the command of Captain John Page, the redoubt was constructed in the shape of a square, sixty feet on each side. According to an account by Frances Roe, a later commander's wife who was stationed there in January 1873, it was laid out with many aspects of larger fortifications, such as bastions, ditches, and a ten-foot-tall parapet. Inside, the fortification included log-reinforced rooms for the garrison that, under Roe's supervision, were capable of becoming "clean and cheerful" for a military wife.

Today, the walls have been eroded somewhat, especially along Clark Creek on the redoubt's southern side; they are generally only about two or three feet above the surrounding terrain. Nevertheless, its structure is overall strong enough that the redoubt is expected to survive essentially intact long into the future.
