= Lorentz Schmidt =

American architect (1884–1952)

- Born: June 28, 1884; Clyde, Kansas
- Died: February 5, 1952 (aged 67)
- Occupation: Architect
- Awards: Fellow, American Institute of Architects (1951)
- Practice: Lorentz Schmidt; Lorentz Schmidt & Company; Schmidt, Boucher & Overend; Lorentz Schmidt, McVay & Peddie

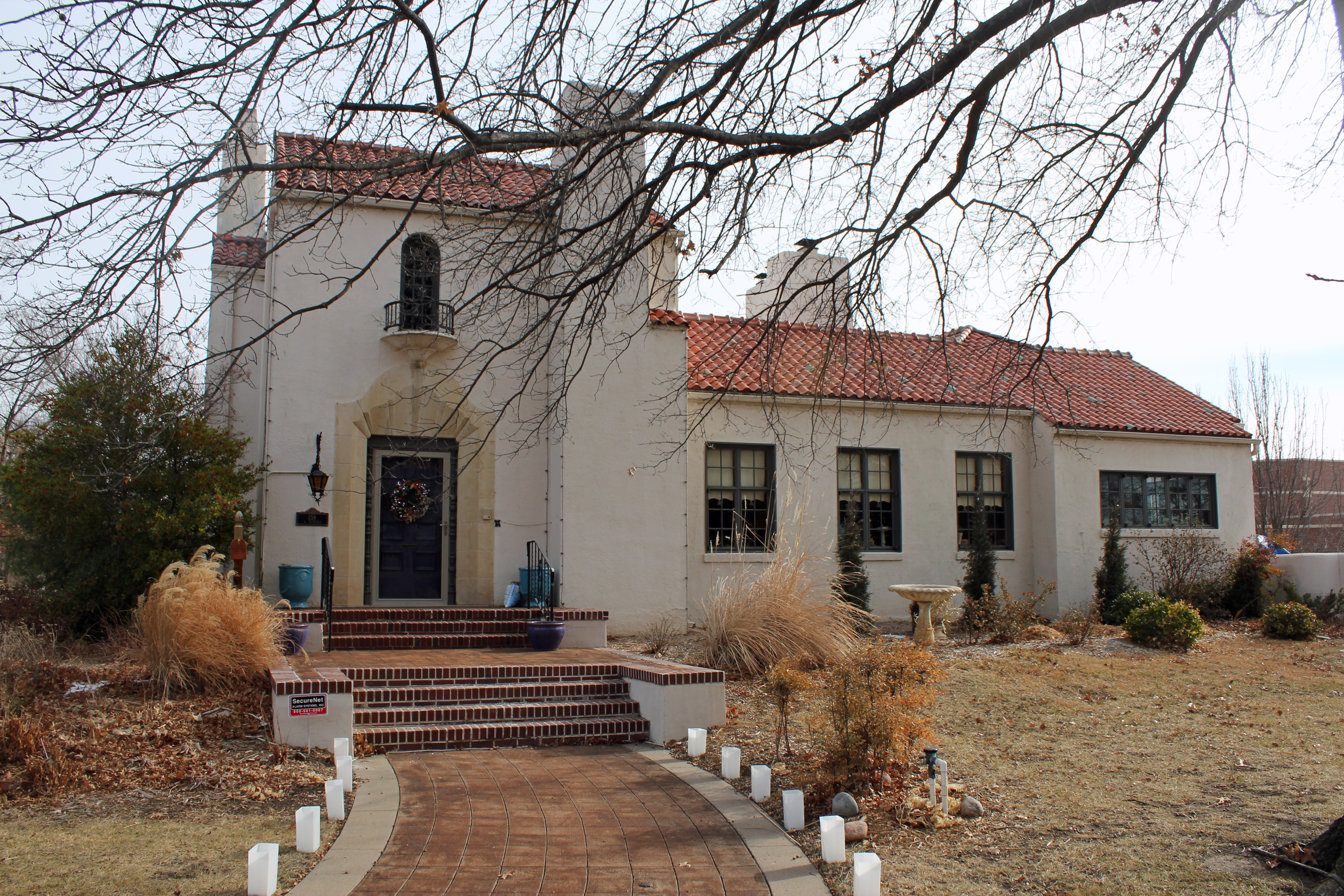
The C. M. Jackson house in Wichita, designed by Lorentz Schmidt & Company and completed in 1924.

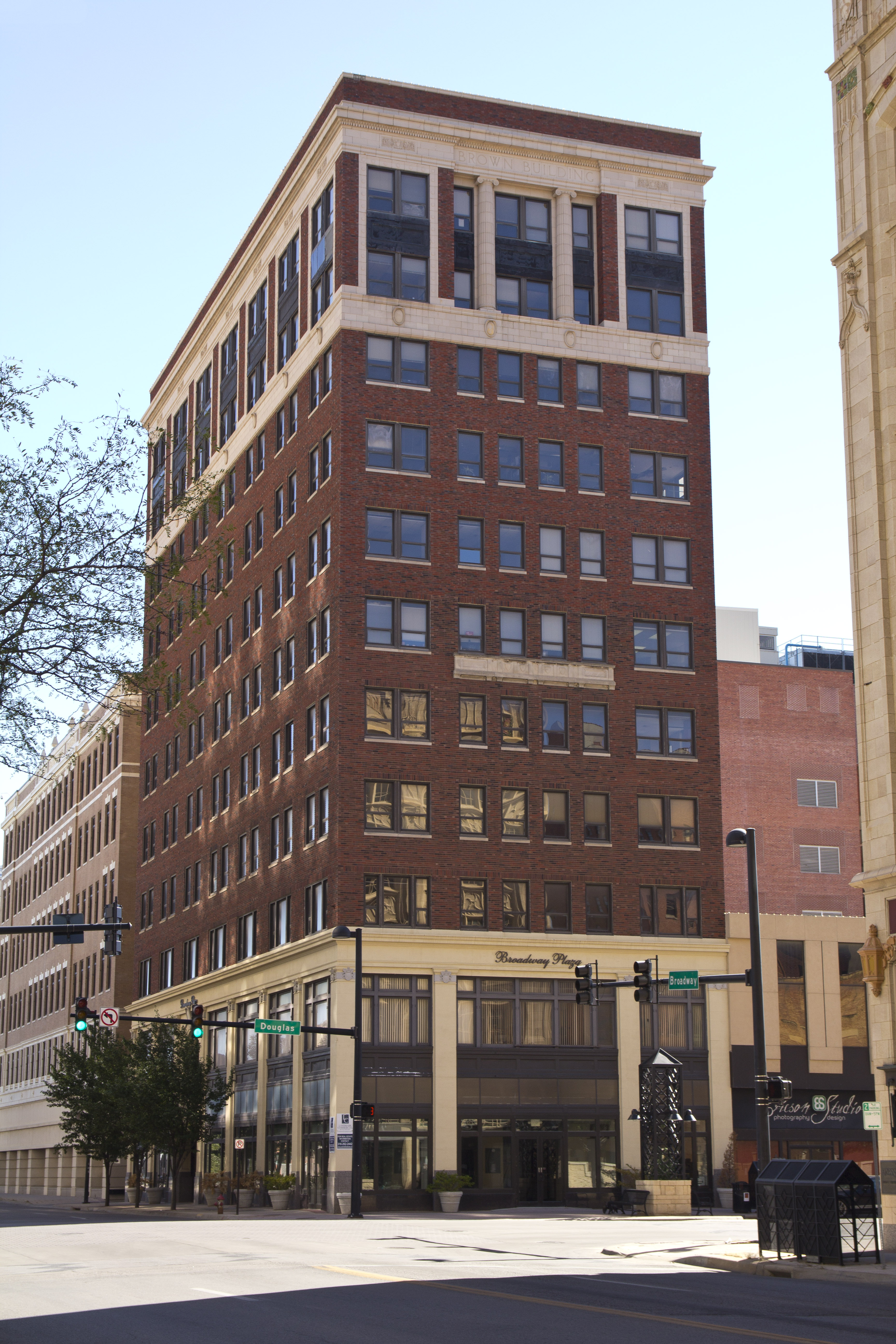
The Brown Building in Wichita, designed by Schmidt, Boucher & Overend and completed in 1927.

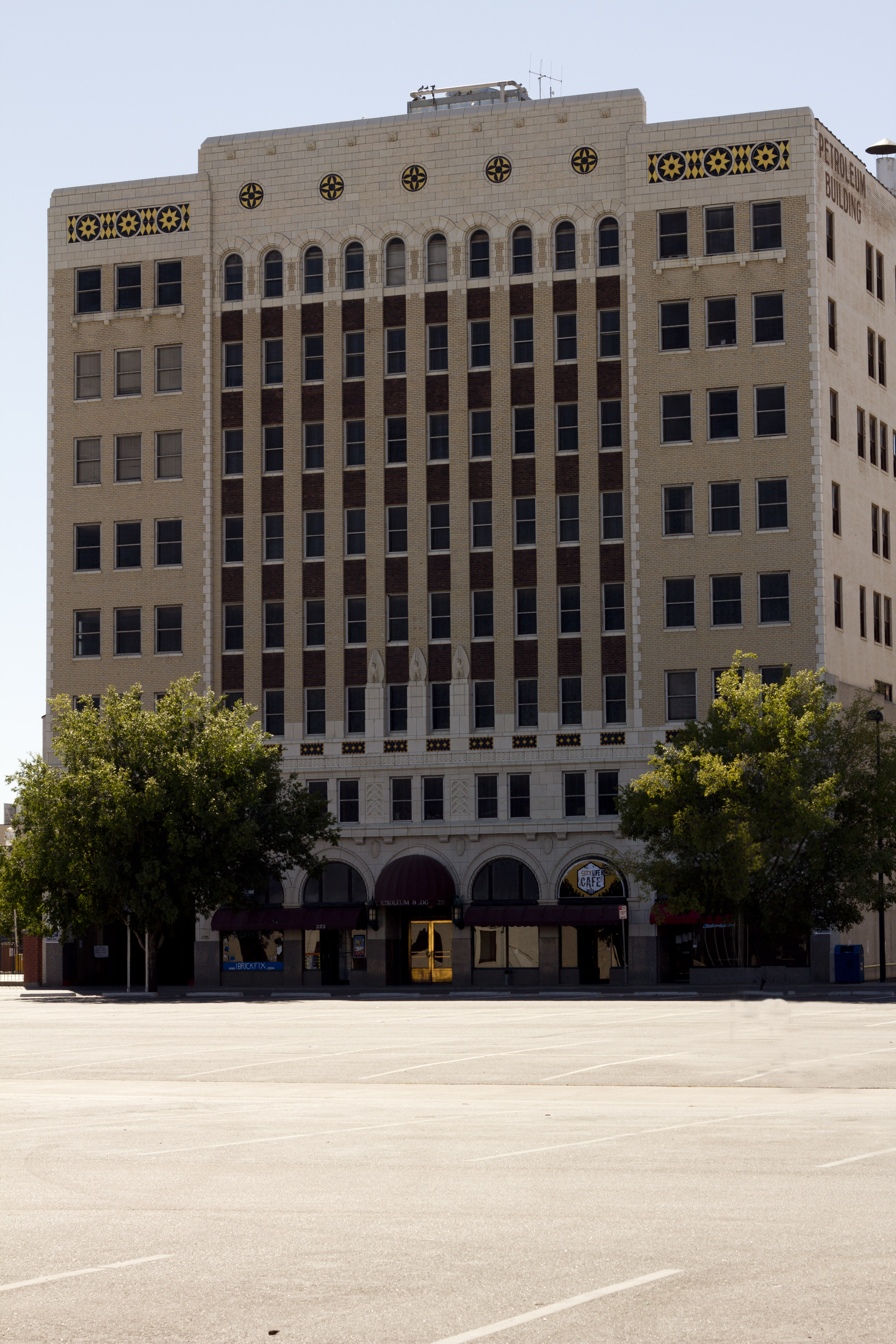
The Ellis-Singleton Building in Wichita, designed by Schmidt, Boucher & Overend and completed in 1929.

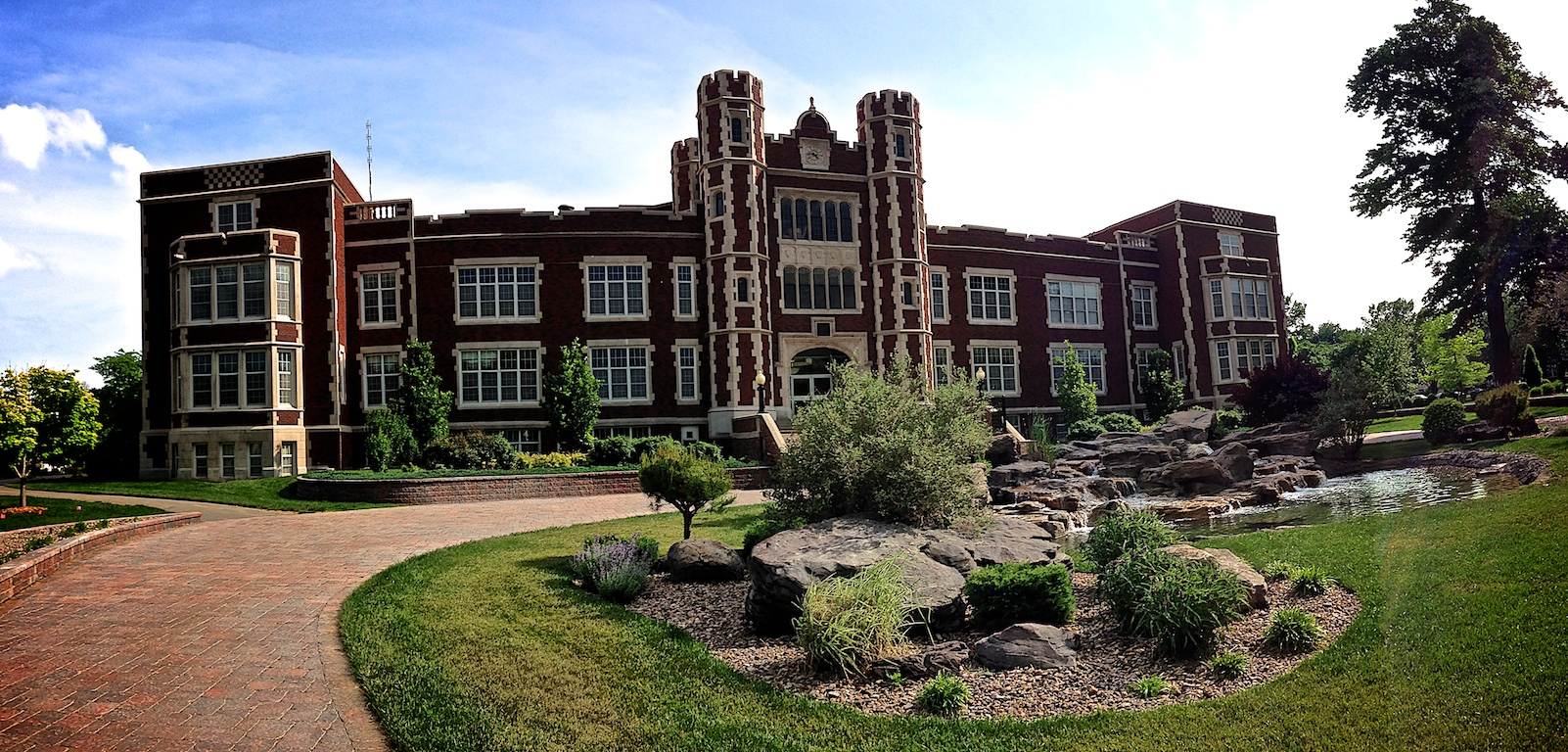
Pioneer Hall of Kansas Wesleyan University, designed by Schmidt, Boucher & Overend and completed in 1930.

Lorentz Schmidt FAIA (April 25, 1884 – February 5, 1952) was a prominent architect in Kansas. He practiced in Wichita, Kansas from 1915 until his death in 1952.

== Life and career ==
Lorentz "Schmidty" Schmidt was born April 25, 1884, in Clyde, Kansas to Bernhardt Schmidt and Magdalene Schmidt, nee Gram. His parents were farmers who had immigrated to the United States from Denmark in 1878. At the age of 17 Schmidt suffered an injury which made physical labor impossible, but he was able to continue his education. He attended Kansas State Normal School and the University of Illinois, graduating from the latter in 1913 with a BS in architecture. At Illinois he was a member of the Arcus Society, which in 1914 was incorporated into Alpha Rho Chi. After two years working for Holabird & Roche and other architects in Chicago, Schmidt moved to Wichita in 1915, where he established an independent office. In 1920 Schmidt formed the partnership of Lorentz Schmidt & Company with Cecil F. Boucher and Harrison G. Overend. This was reorganized in 1925 as Schmidt, Boucher & Overend. Schmidt withdrew from the partnership in 1932 and spent the next four years in the insurance business. In 1936 Schmidt reestablished his architectural firm. In 1946 Schmidt formed a new partnership, Lorentz Schmidt, McVay & Peddie with Wayne M. McVay and Thomas H. Peddie. This partnership continued until his death in 1952.

Shortly after he established his practice, he began the organized effort to get an architectural registration law passed in Kansas. This law was only passed in 1949, after over thirty years of lobbying and other efforts. In 1918 Schmidt was a founding member of the Kansas Society of Architects, the first successful attempt to organize architects in the state, and in 1921 was a charter member of the new Kansas chapter of the American Institute of Architects (AIA), which largely succeeded the society. In 1948 he was elected Central States regional director of the AIA and in 1951 was elected a Fellow in recognition of his service to the profession. His election was supported by architects in all parts of the United States.

== Legacy ==
Schmidt's initial firm, from which he withdrew in 1932, continued as Overend & Boucher. That firm lasted until the death of Overend in 1957. In addition to his practice, Overend is noted for his collection of medals. His second firm was initially continued after his death by his partners under the same name. It was changed to McVay, Peddie, Schmidt & Associates in 1957, to McVay, Peddie, Schmidt & Allen in 1963, to McVay, Schmidt, Allen in 1970 and lastly to Schmidt, Allen & Pott. Works of the successor firm include the current Wichita City Hall, completed in 1975.

Many Wichita and Kansas architects, most notably Glen H. Thomas, were trained in Schmidt's office.

At least thirteen buildings designed by Schmidt and his partners have been listed on the United States National Register of Historic Places, and others contribute to listed historic districts.

== Personal life ==
Schmidt was married in 1919 to Gladys Evangeline Magill. They had two children, one son and one daughter. He was a member of St. James Episcopal Church and designed its building, completed in 1926. He died February 5, 1952, in Wichita at the age of 67.

== Architectural works ==
=== Lorentz Schmidt, 1915–1920 and 1936–1946 ===
- 1917 – Sunnyside School, (Note: NRHP-listed.) 3003 Kellogg Dr, Wichita, Kansas
- 1918 – Clyde School, 620 Broadway St, Clyde, Kansas
- 1919 – Hamilton Middle School, 1407 S Broadway St, Wichita, Kansas
- 1920 – Fresh Air Baby Camp, 1229 W 11th St, Wichita, Kansas
- 1938 – McKinley School, (Note: A contributing resource to the McKinley Residential Historic District, NRHP-listed in 2008.) 308 E 1st St, Newton, Kansas
- 1939 – Cooper Elementary School, 816 Oak St, Newton, Kansas
- 1939 – Jefferson Elementary School (former), 300 S Jefferson Ave, Iola, Kansas
- 1939 – Lincoln Grade School (former), 700 N Jefferson Ave, Iola, Kansas
- 1939 – Sandra Theatre, (Note: Demolished.) 121 E William St, Wichita, Kansas
- 1941 – Irving Elementary School, 1642 N Market St, Wichita, Kansas

=== Lorentz Schmidt & Company, 1920–1925 ===
- 1922 – W.O. Van Arsdale House, 201 N Broadview, Wichita, Kansas
- 1923 – McCormick-Armstrong Press Building, 1501 E Douglas Ave, Wichita, Kansas
- 1923 – Wichita East High School, 2301 E Douglas Ave, Wichita, Kansas
- 1923 – Woolf Brothers Clothing Company building, 135 E Douglas St, Wichita, Kansas
- 1924 – C. M. Jackman House, 158 N Roosevelt St, Wichita, Kansas
- 1925 – Chanute Memorial Building, 101 S Lincoln Ave, Chanute, Kansas
- 1925 – Will Family Academic Center, Bethel College, North Newton, Kansas
- 1926 – Powell House, 330 N Crestway St, Wichita, Kansas
- 1926 – St. James Episcopal Church, 3750 E Douglas Ave, Wichita, Kansas

=== Schmidt, Boucher & Overend, 1925–1932 ===
- 1926 – Winfield City Hall, 200 E 9th Ave, Winfield, Kansas
- 1927 – Brown Building, 105 S Broadway St, Wichita, Kansas
- 1927 – Hillcrest Apartments, 115 S Rutan St, Wichita, Kansas
- 1927 – Innes Department Store, 220-230 E. William St, Wichita, Kansas
- 1929 – Ellis-Singleton Building, 221 S Broadway, Wichita, Kansas
- 1930 – J. Arch Butts Packard Building, 1525 E Douglas Ave, Wichita, Kansas
- 1930 – Pioneer Hall, Kansas Wesleyan University, Salina, Kansas

=== Lorentz Schmidt, McVay & Peddie, from 1946 ===
- 1948 – Central Christian Church (former), 445 N Market St, Wichita, Kansas
- 1952 – Catholic Church of the Blessed Sacrament, 124 N Roosevelt St, Wichita, Kansas

== See also ==
- Lorentz Schmidt, Kansas Historical Society
