= Dighton High School =

- Dighton High School (listed as Lane County Community High School)
- U.S. National Register of Historic Places
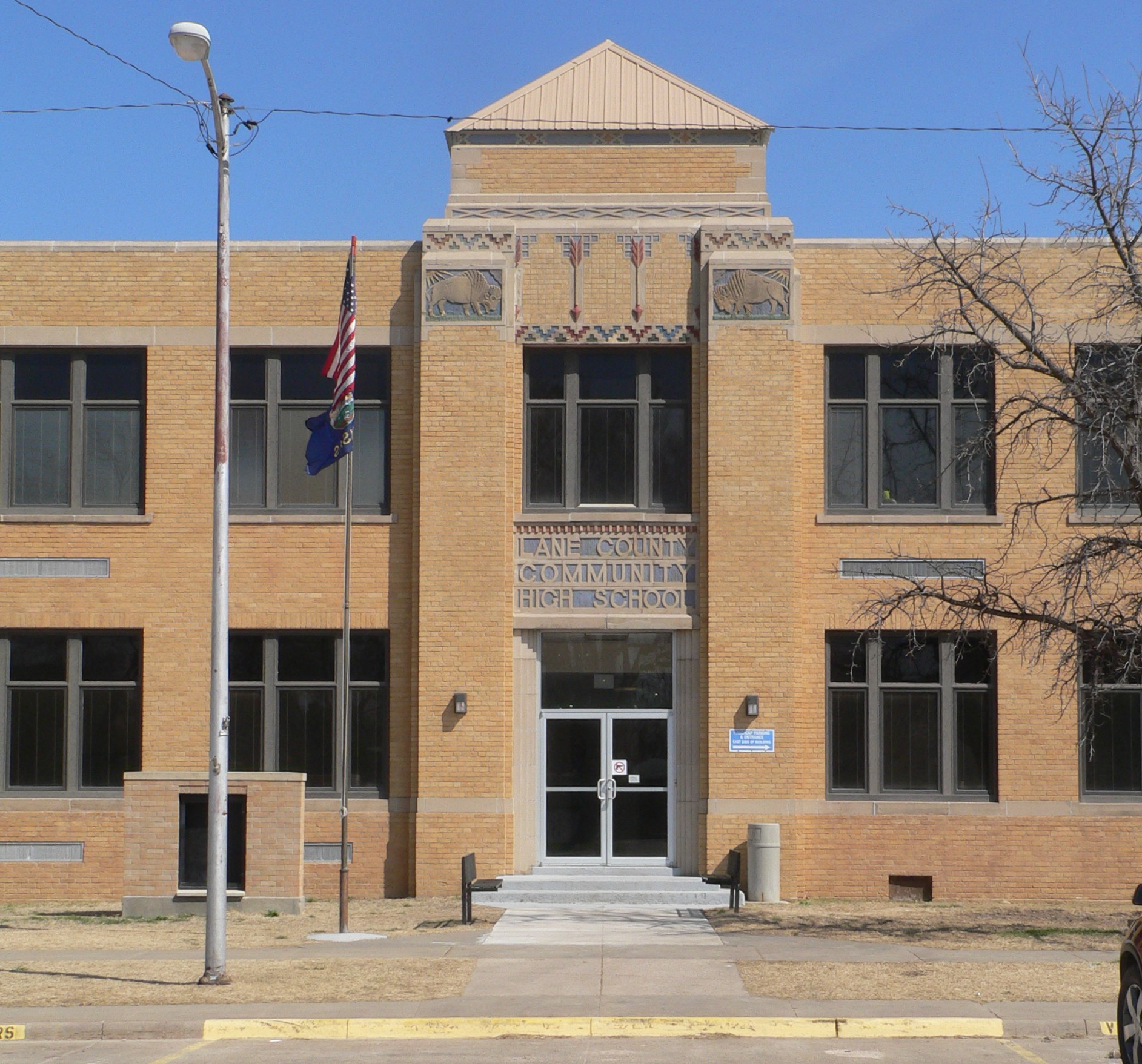

- Location within Kansas Location within the United States
- Location: 200 S. Wichita Ave., Dighton, Kansas
- Coordinates: 38°28′50″N 100°27′40″W
- Area: 5 acres (2.0 ha)
- Built: 1938
- Architect: Glen H. Thomas
- Architectural style: Art Deco
- Website: www.usd482.org/dighton-jr-sr-high-school
- MPS: Public Schools of Kansas MPS
- NRHP reference No.: 05000978
- Added to NRHP: September 6, 2005

Dighton High School, also known as Dighton Jr/Sr High School (DJSHS), is a public secondary school in Dighton, Kansas and a part of Dighton Unified School District 482. Its building, Lane County Community High School, located at 200 S. Wichita Ave., was built in 1938. It was listed on the National Register of Historic Places in 2005.

It is a Public Works Administration (PWA) project and it is Art Deco in style. Glen H. Thomas of Wichita was the architect and the contractor was M. C. Foy.
