= Sitka Township, Kansas =

Sitka Township
- Township
- Location in Clark County
- Coordinates: 37°03′00″N 099°40′41″W
- Country: United States
- State: Kansas
- County: Clark

Area
  - Total: 172.26 sq mi (446.16 km^{2})
  - Land: 171.44 sq mi (444.04 km^{2})
  - Water: 0.82 sq mi (2.13 km^{2}) 0.48%
- Elevation: 1,844 ft (562 m)

Population (2020)
  - Total: 51
  - Density: 0.30/sq mi (0.11/km^{2})
- GNIS feature ID: 0470816

Sitka Township is a township in Clark County, Kansas, United States. As of the 2020 census, its population was 51.

== Geography ==
Sitka Township covers an area of 172.26 square miles (446.2 km^{2}) and contains no incorporated settlements.

The streams of Bear Creek, Day Creek, Snake Creek, Spring Creek and Trout run through this township.

== Transportation ==
Sitka Township contains one airport or landing strip, Shupe Airport.
