= Bear Creek Redoubt =

- U.S. National Register of Historic Places
- Nearest city: Ashland, Kansas
- Area: 2.5 acres (1.0 ha)
- NRHP reference No.: 78001275
- Added to NRHP: March 30, 1978

The Bear Creek Redoubt near Ashland, Kansas, was listed on the National Register of Historic Places in 1978.

It is an earthen redoubt about 50 by 50 feet (15 m × 15 m) in plan. It was built in fall of 1870 as a military outpost to protect mail and other shipments.

== See also ==
- Cimarron Redoubt
