= Lexington Township, Clark County, Kansas =

Lexington Township
- Township
- Location in Clark County
- Coordinates: 37°17′30″N 99°40′21″W
- Country: United States
- State: Kansas
- County: Clark

Area
  - Total: 89.7 sq mi (232.4 km^{2})
  - Land: 89.54 sq mi (231.91 km^{2})
  - Water: 0.19 sq mi (0.49 km^{2}) 0.21%
- Elevation: 2,077 ft (633 m)

Population (2020)
  - Total: 38
  - Density: 0.42/sq mi (0.16/km^{2})
- GNIS ID: 470733

Lexington Township is a township in Clark County, Kansas, United States. As of the 2020 census, its population was 38.

== Geography ==
Lexington Township covers an area of 89.73 square miles (232.4 km^{2}) and contains no incorporated settlements. According to the USGS, it contains one cemetery, Lexington.

The streams of Cat Creek, Fish Creek, Granger Creek and Lone Tree Creek run through this township.
