= Fort Lookout (Kansas) =

Fort Lookout, in the northwest corner of Republic County, Kansas, was established by the US Army near the beginning of the American Civil War, in 1861. Its purpose was to protect the military road running from Fort Riley, Kansas, to Fort Kearney, Nebraska Territory. The area witnessed many attacks by Indians. Fort Lookout was perched on a high bluff overlooking the Republican River. The fort was two miles south of the Kansas-Nebraska border.

The log fort was two stories high. The second story was built at a 45-degree angle across the top of the first story, thus providing eight sides where its occupants could observe the surrounding countryside. Some of the logs had six-inch square notches cut into them for use as rifle ports. The fort had a flat roof.

During the Civil War many wagon trains used the military road guarded by Fort Lookout. Some may have been attacked by Indians. By the end of the War, the threat of Indian attacks greatly diminished. In 1867 or 1868 the Army abandoned the fort, which was used by the state militia during an Indian uprising in 1868.

Until at least 1870 the local population used the fort as a place of refuge during disturbances with the Indians. After that, someone used the old fort for a home. The building was eventually abandoned and was torn down or fell down from neglect.
