= Ashland High School (Kansas) =

Ashland Jr/Sr High School

Location
- 311 J.E. Humphreys Street; Ashland, Kansas 67831; United States; 37°11′39″N 99°46′32″W

Information
- School type: Public, High School
- School district: Ashland-Englewood USD 220
- CEEB code: 170130
- Staff: 4.77 (FTE)
- Grades: 9-12
- Gender: coed
- Enrollment: 74 (2023–2024)
- Student to teacher ratio: 15.51
- Color
- Team name: Blue Jays

Ashland High School is a small public high school in Ashland, Kansas, United States. It is part of the Ashland-Englewood USD 220 school district.

Ashoand High School competes within the KSHSAA 1A classification, it operates on a four-day school week, its teachers are on a 166-day contract, and a 96% attendance rate and 95-100% graduation rate has been accomplished. The school mascot is the Bluejay, the school colors are blue and white.

== History ==
Former principal G.N. Gould made fossil discoveries of a prehistoric "serpent" (Plesiosaurus) in a canyon where additional finds followed.

In 1911 the Kansas High School Debating League was won by Fred Hinkle, Cale Carson, and Clarence Bare of Ashland High School.

In 1943 students helped build a livestock squeeze. The school has about 65 students.

== See also ==
- List of high schools in Kansas
- List of unified school districts in Kansas
