= Englewood Township, Kansas =

Englewood Township
- Township
- Location in Clark County
- Coordinates: 37°11′14″N 099°57′39″W
- Country: United States
- State: Kansas
- County: Clark

Area
  - Total: 206.92 sq mi (535.91 km^{2})
  - Land: 206.77 sq mi (535.53 km^{2})
  - Water: 0.15 sq mi (0.38 km^{2}) 0.07%
- Elevation: 2,083 ft (635 m)

Population (2020)
  - Total: 110
  - Density: 0.53/sq mi (0.21/km^{2})
- GNIS feature ID: 0470804

Englewood Township is a township in Clark County, Kansas, United States. As of the 2020 census, its population was 110.

== Geography ==
Englewood Township covers an area of 206.92 square miles (535.9 km^{2}) and contains one incorporated settlement, Englewood. According to the USGS, it contains one cemetery, Englewood.

Perry Lake and Proffitt Lake are within this township. The streams of Antelope Creek, East Indian Creek, Fivemile Creek, Gyp Creek, Indian Creek, Johns Creek, Sand Creek, Twomile Creek and West Indian Creek run through this township.
