= Ashland Elementary School (Kansas) =

- Ashland Elementary School (listed as Ashland Grade School)
- U.S. National Register of Historic Places
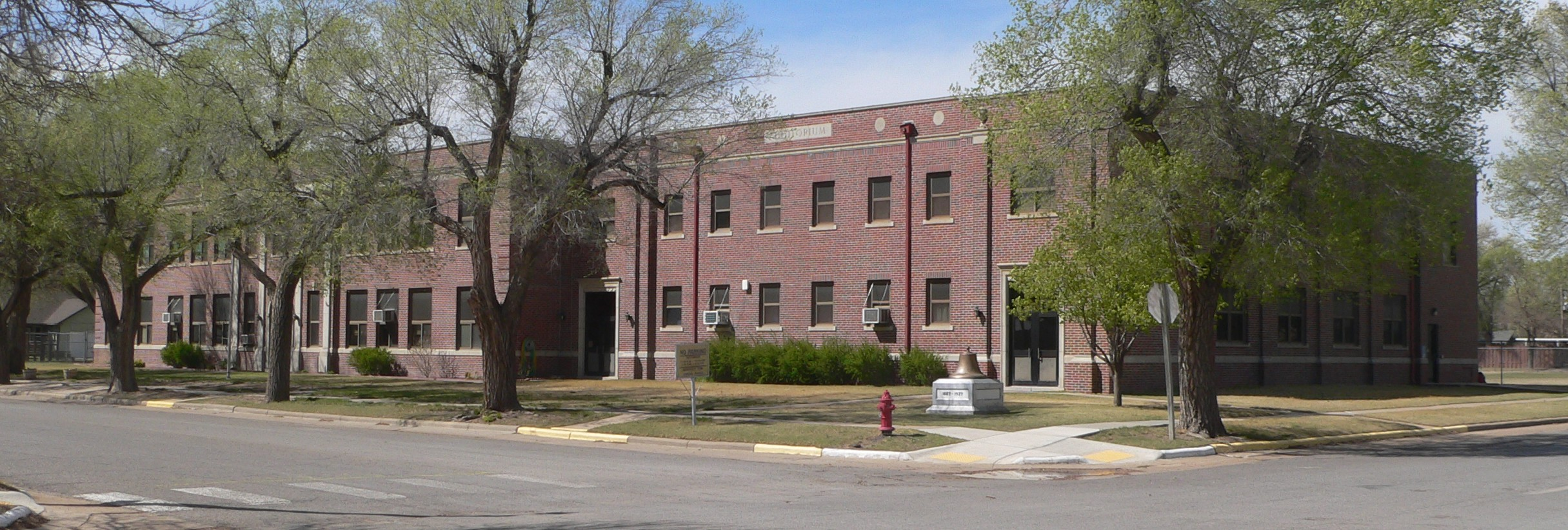

- Location within Kansas Location within the United States
- Location: 210 W. 7th St., Ashland, Kansas, U.S.
- Coordinates: 37°11′23″N 99°46′04″W
- Area: 5 acres (2.0 ha)
- Built: 1937
- Built by: Underhill Construction Co.
- Architect: Glen H. Thomas
- Architectural style: Classical Revival
- MPS: Public Schools of Kansas MPS
- NRHP reference No.: 05001245
- Added to NRHP: November 15, 2005

Ashland Elementary School, also known as Ashland Grade School (according to its National Register of Historic Places listing), is a former public elementary school in Ashland, Kansas. It is a part of USD 220 Ashland Public Schools.

Located at 210 W. 7th St. in Ashland, Kansas, was built in 1937 with Public Works Administration funding. It was listed on the NRHP in 2005.

It is a two-story red brick building designed with elements of Classical Revival style. It has a flat roof with a parapet with stone detailing.

It was deemed significant "as the public grade school in Ashland, an important component in the development and survival of the small rural community in southwest Kansas....and also significant ... as a representative of a New Deal Era school and the work of regional school architect Glen H. Thomas."

The majority of the building was closed on April 21, 2025 after the USD 220 School Board voted to move all students into Ashland Junior/Senior High School, starting with the 2025/2026 school year. However, the gymnasium is still in use.
