= Dighton, Kansas =

City in Lane County, Kansas

- City and County seat
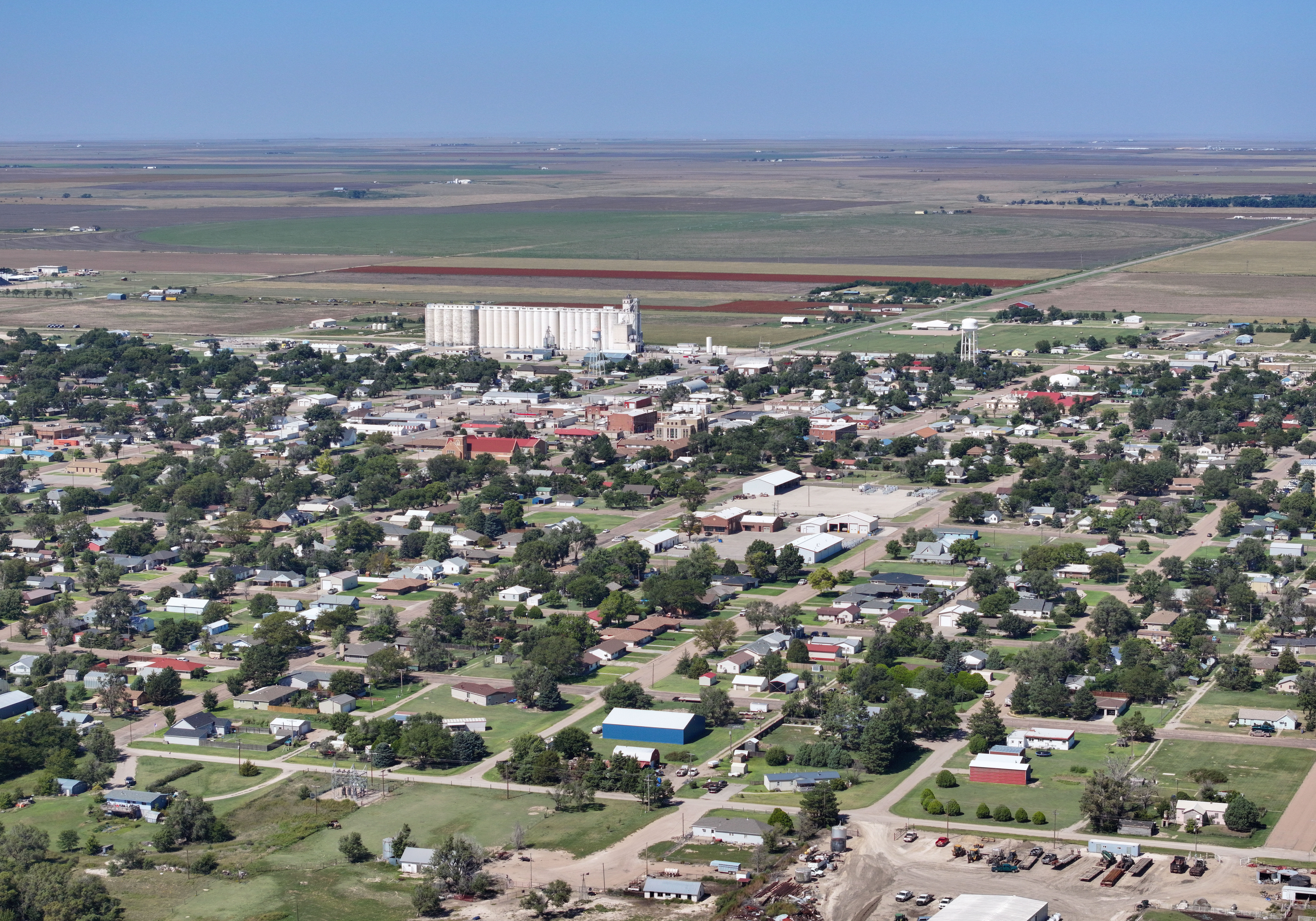
- Aerial view (2025)

- Location within Lane County and Kansas

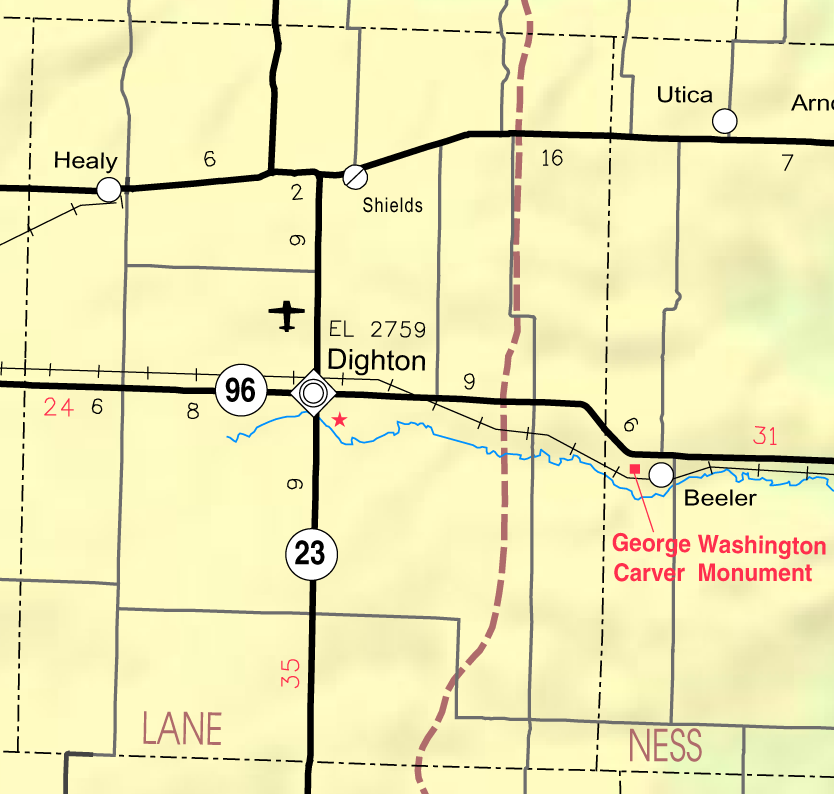
- KDOT map of Lane County (legend)
- Coordinates: 38°28′52″N 100°27′59″W
- Country: United States
- State: Kansas
- County: Lane
- Founded: 1879
- Incorporated: 1887
- Named for: Dick Dighton

Area
  - Total: 0.87 sq mi (2.25 km^{2})
  - Land: 0.87 sq mi (2.25 km^{2})
  - Water: 0 sq mi (0.00 km^{2})
- Elevation: 2,769 ft (844 m)

Population (2020)
  - Total: 960
  - Density: 1,100/sq mi (430/km^{2})
- Time zone: UTC-6 (CST)
  - Summer (DST): UTC-5 (CDT)
- ZIP Code: 67839
- Area code: 620
- FIPS code: 20-18050
- GNIS ID: 2394534
- Website: dightonkansas.com

Dighton is a city in and the county seat of Lane County, Kansas, United States. As of the 2020 census, the population of the city was 960. Dighton is named for Dick Dighton, a surveyor.

== History ==
=== 19th century ===
The Homestead Act of 1862 offered 160 acres (0.65 km^{2}) of land in the American West, previously owned by railroads, to homesteaders who could live on the land for five years. Drawn west by the promise of free, fertile land, pioneer settlers arrived in Kansas starting in 1869. In 1879, W.A. Watson arrived at the town site, and a post office was established. In 1885, there were three houses and seven voters in town. Lane County became a county in 1886, with Dighton as its county seat. By 1900, the population was 194, and by 1910 it had grown to 370, and the town had banks; a flour mill; a grain elevator; two newspapers; public schools; a hotel; merchants; Baptist, Catholic, and Methodist churches; telegraph service; a band and telephones.

Life was difficult for the early pioneers, who built houses made of sod and found that the land was quite dry, and not as fertile as they had been led to believe. A song written by Frank Baker, the Lane County Bachelor, became a popular folk song throughout the western United States.

=== 20th century ===
On May 23, 1928, the Fleagle Gang arrived in Dighton after robbing the First National Bank of Lamar, Colorado. Needing medical attention, they kidnapped local doctor W.W. Wineinger, and later shot him and dumped his body into a ravine.

The courtroom mural, "The First House of Lane County," by Mary Alice Bosley, was featured in Kansas Murals: A Traveler's Guide, by Jost and Loewenstein.

== Geography ==
Dighton is located at the intersection of K-96 and K-23.

According to the United States Census Bureau, the city has a total area of 0.88 square miles (2.28 km^{2}), all land.

== Demographics ==
Historical population
Census	Pop.	Note	%±
1890	304		—
1900	194		−36.2%
1910	370		90.7%
1920	503		35.9%
1930	803		59.6%
1940	974		21.3%
1950	1,246		27.9%
1960	1,526		22.5%
1970	1,540		0.9%
1980	1,390		−9.7%
1990	1,361		−2.1%
2000	1,261		−7.3%
2010	1,038		−17.7%
2020	960		−7.5%
U.S. Decennial Census

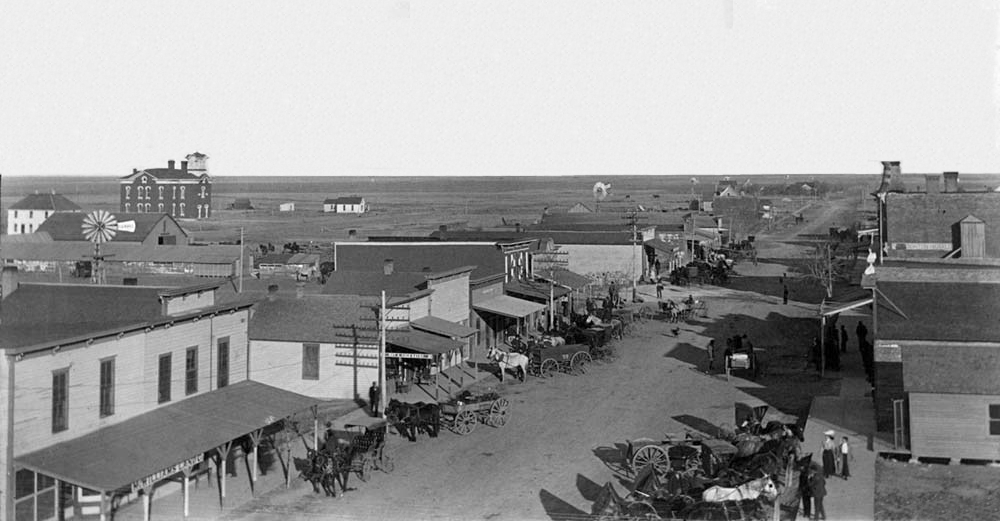
Long Street in Dighton, circa 1900-1906

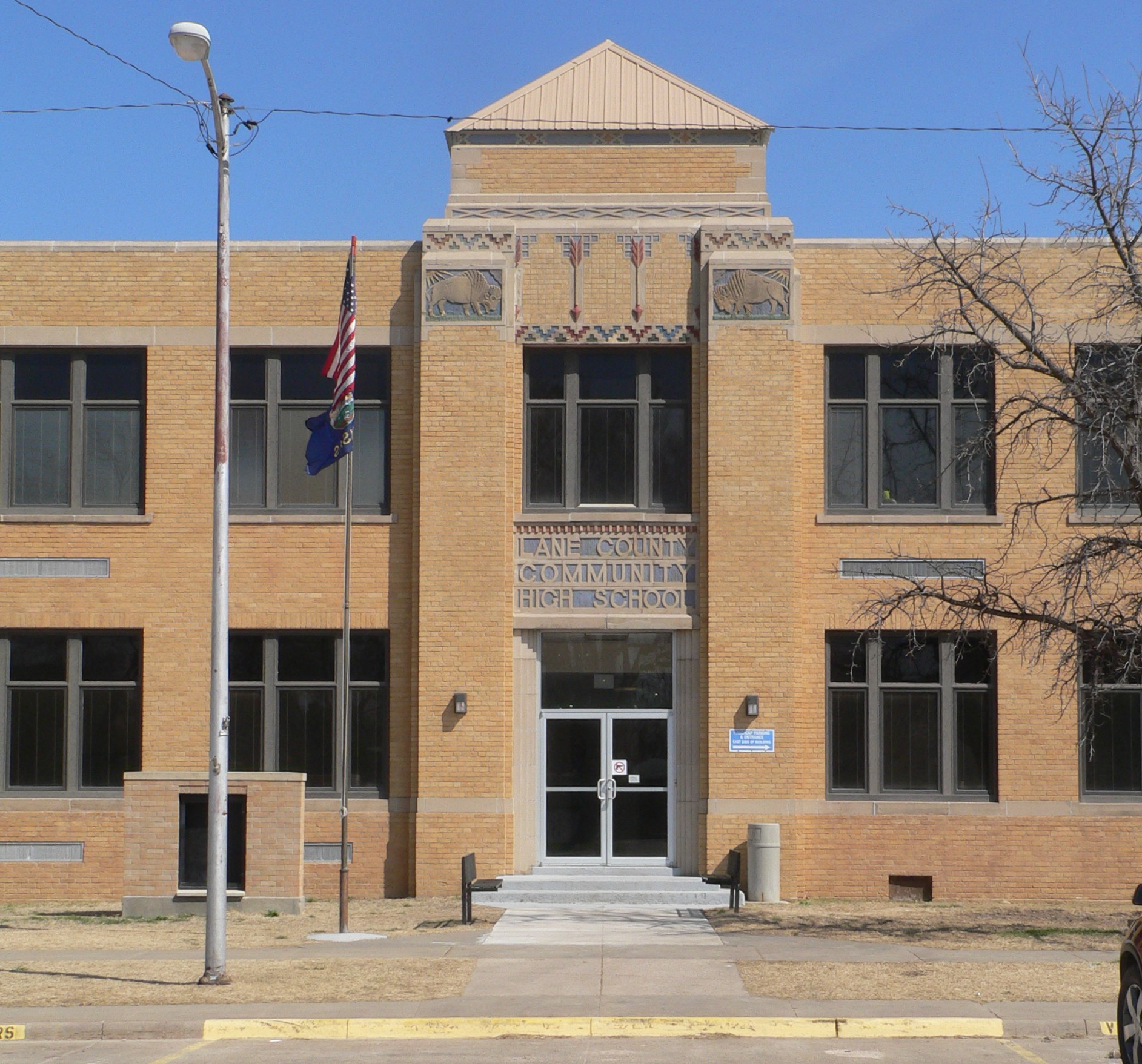
Dighton High School (2015)

=== 2020 census ===
The 2020 United States census counted 960 people, 461 households, and 244 families in Dighton. The population density was 1,107.3 per square mile (427.5/km^{2}). There were 550 housing units at an average density of 634.4 per square mile (244.9/km^{2}). The racial makeup was 88.44% (849) white or European American (85.62% non-Hispanic white), 0.0% (0) black or African-American, 0.42% (4) Native American or Alaska Native, 0.0% (0) Asian, 0.21% (2) Pacific Islander or Native Hawaiian, 4.38% (42) from other races, and 6.56% (63) from two or more races. Hispanic or Latino of any race was 11.25% (108) of the population.

Of the 461 households, 25.2% had children under the age of 18; 42.7% were married couples living together; 28.4% had a female householder with no spouse or partner present. 44.7% of households consisted of individuals and 21.7% had someone living alone who was 65 years of age or older. The average household size was 2.2 and the average family size was 3.0. The percent of those with a bachelor's degree or higher was estimated to be 14.1% of the population.

20.7% of the population was under the age of 18, 4.8% from 18 to 24, 20.6% from 25 to 44, 29.8% from 45 to 64, and 24.1% who were 65 years of age or older. The median age was 48.5 years. For every 100 females, there were 104.7 males. For every 100 females ages 18 and older, there were 106.2 males.

The 2016–2020 5-year American Community Survey estimates show that the median household income was $40,962 (with a margin of error of +/- $28,238) and the median family income was $80,368 (+/- $7,386). Males had a median income of $34,917 (+/- $5,124) versus $24,464 (+/- $10,724) for females. The median income for those above 16 years old was $31,920 (+/- $6,548). Approximately, 8.2% of families and 10.4% of the population were below the poverty line, including 14.9% of those under the age of 18 and 3.0% of those ages 65 or over.

=== 2010 census ===
As of the census of 2010, there were 1,038 people, 506 households, and 282 families residing in the city. The population density was 1,179.5 inhabitants per square mile (455.4/km^{2}). There were 615 housing units at an average density of 698.9 per square mile (269.8/km^{2}). The racial makeup of the city was 95.6% White, 0.6% African American, 0.9% Native American, 0.3% Asian, 0.3% from other races, and 2.4% from two or more races. Hispanic or Latino of any race were 3.1% of the population.

There were 506 households, of which 22.5% had children under the age of 18 living with them, 47.0% were married couples living together, 5.5% had a female householder with no husband present, 3.2% had a male householder with no wife present, and 44.3% were non-families. 41.3% of all households were made up of individuals, and 20.4% had someone living alone who was 65 years of age or older. The average household size was 2.05 and the average family size was 2.78.

The median age in the city was 46.2 years. 20.8% of residents were under the age of 18; 6.1% were between the ages of 18 and 24; 22.1% were from 25 to 44; 28.8% were from 45 to 64; and 22.2% were 65 years of age or older. The gender makeup of the city was 48.4% male and 51.6% female.

== Education ==
The community is served by Dighton USD 482 public school district, which operates two schools in Dighton, the Dighton Jr/Sr High School and the Dighton Elementary School.

The Lane County Library is based in Dighton.
