= Clark County, Kansas =

County in Kansas, United States

- County
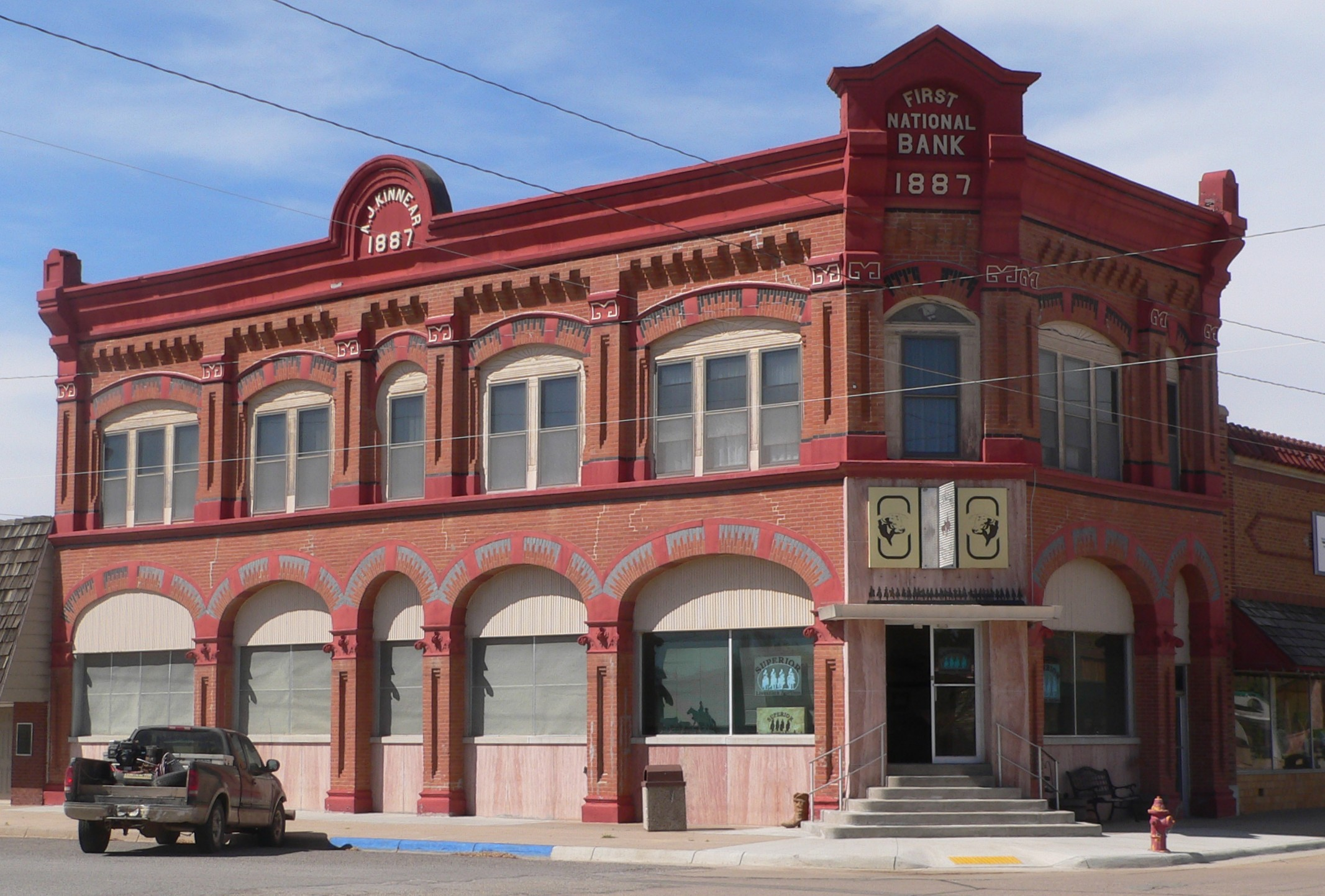
- Stockgrowers State Bank in Ashland (2016)

- Location within the U.S. state of Kansas
- Coordinates: 37°14′N 99°50′W
- Country: United States
- State: Kansas
- Founded: February 26, 1867
- Named for: Charles F. Clarke
- Seat: Ashland
- Largest city: Ashland

Area
  - Total: 977 sq mi (2,530 km^{2})
  - Land: 975 sq mi (2,530 km^{2})
  - Water: 2.6 sq mi (6.7 km^{2}) 0.3%

Population (2020)
  - Total: 1,991
  - Estimate (2025): 1,900 ▼
  - Density: 2/sq mi (0.77/km^{2})
- Time zone: UTC−6 (Central)
  - Summer (DST): UTC−5 (CDT)
- Area code: 620
- Congressional district: 1st
- Website: ClarkCountyKS.com

Clark County is a county located in the U.S. state of Kansas. Its county seat and most populous city is Ashland. As of the 2020 census, the county population was 1,991. The county was named after Charles Clarke.

== History ==
Clark County, Kansas, was established on February 26, 1867, from the territory of the former Peketon County, and named for Charles F. Clarke, a captain in the 6th Regiment Kansas Volunteer Cavalry during the American Civil War, though the final 'e' was later dropped. As an unorganized county, it was initially attached to Ford County for judicial purposes until 1883, when it was incorporated into Ford County on account of its sparse population and prosperous cattle ranches. This inclusion displeased the settlers of Clark County, and Clark County was again detached from Ford County in March 1885, this time attached to Comanche County for judicial purposes. Clark County was finally organized in May 1885, with the county seat at Ashland.

The opening of the Mount Jesus Trail, passing near a hill in the center of the county named Mount Jesus by the Custer expedition in 1868 on its way from Fort Dodge to Fort Supply, along with the onset of Texas cattle drives through the county, marked the beginning of American settlement in Clark County. Settlement intensified with the establishment of a road ranch by John Glenn in 1874 near present-day Ashland, the beginning of weekly stagecoach service along the Mount Jesus Trail in 1875, and the opening of additional cattle ranches in 1876. Efforts to create a Benedictine colony in the late 1870s near Mount Casino were abandoned after resistance from cattlemen and an Indian raid.

Clark City hosted the first school and newspaper in the county, but both activities shifted to Ashland as the latter town grew, including by direct payments to Clark City residents to relocate. Ultimately Ashland became the county's dominant town and was officially designated the county seat in 1885 while Clark City was abandoned. Ashland remains the county seat and principal city of Clark County to this day.

== Geography ==
According to the United States Census Bureau, the county has a total area of 977 square miles (2,530 km^{2}), of which 975 square miles (2,530 km^{2}) is land and 2.6 square miles (6.7 km^{2}) (%) is water.

=== Adjacent counties ===
- Ford County (north)
- Kiowa County (northeast)
- Comanche County (east)
- Harper County, Oklahoma (southeast)
- Beaver County, Oklahoma (southwest)
- Meade County (west)

=== Major highways ===
Sources: National Atlas, U.S. Census Bureau

- U.S. Route 54
- U.S. Route 160
- U.S. Route 183
- U.S. Route 283
- Kansas Highway 34

== Demographics ==
Historical population
Census	Pop.	Note	%±
1880	163		—
1890	2,357		1,346.0%
1900	1,701		−27.8%
1910	4,093		140.6%
1920	4,989		21.9%
1930	4,796		−3.9%
1940	4,081		−14.9%
1950	3,946		−3.3%
1960	3,396		−13.9%
1970	2,896		−14.7%
1980	2,599		−10.3%
1990	2,418		−7.0%
2000	2,390		−1.2%
2010	2,215		−7.3%
2020	1,991		−10.1%
2025 (est.)	1,900	▼	−4.6%
U.S. Decennial Census; 1790-1960 1900-1990; 1990-2000 2010-2020

=== 2020 census ===
As of the 2020 census, the county had a population of 1,991. The median age was 41.8 years, 23.8% of residents were under the age of 18, and 23.0% of residents were 65 years of age or older. For every 100 females there were 92.6 males, and for every 100 females age 18 and over there were 86.8 males age 18 and over; 0.0% of residents lived in urban areas while 100.0% lived in rural areas.

The racial makeup of the county was 86.6% White, 0.3% Black or African American, 1.1% American Indian and Alaska Native, 1.2% Asian, 0.1% Native Hawaiian and Pacific Islander, 4.5% from some other race, and 6.3% from two or more races. Hispanic or Latino residents of any race comprised 10.2% of the population.

There were 836 households in the county, of which 30.7% had children under the age of 18 living with them and 27.9% had a female householder with no spouse or partner present. About 32.1% of all households were made up of individuals and 16.1% had someone living alone who was 65 years of age or older.

There were 1,042 housing units, of which 19.8% were vacant. Among occupied housing units, 72.4% were owner-occupied and 27.6% were renter-occupied. The homeowner vacancy rate was 1.0% and the rental vacancy rate was 17.2%.

=== 2000 census ===
As of the census of 2000, there were 2,390 people, 979 households, and 676 families residing in the county. The population density was 2 people per square mile (0.77 people/km^{2}). There were 1,111 housing units at an average density of 1 per square mile (0.39/km^{2}). The racial makeup of the county was 95.77% White, 0.25% Black or African American, 1.13% Native American, 0.08% Asian, 1.88% from other races, and 0.88% from two or more races. Hispanic or Latino of any race were 4.02% of the population.

There were 979 households, out of which 30.20% had children under the age of 18 living with them, 60.30% were married couples living together, 6.20% had a female householder with no husband present, and 30.90% were non-families. 29.60% of all households were made up of individuals, and 17.00% had someone living alone who was 65 years of age or older. The average household size was 2.39 and the average family size was 2.95.

In the county, the population was spread out, with 26.60% under the age of 18, 4.90% from 18 to 24, 23.10% from 25 to 44, 23.60% from 45 to 64, and 21.80% who were 65 years of age or older. The median age was 42 years. For every 100 females there were 95.60 males. For every 100 females age 18 and over, there were 88.50 males.

The median income for a household in the county was $33,857, and the median income for a family was $40,521. Males had a median income of $27,321 versus $20,833 for females. The per capita income for the county was $17,795. About 11.30% of families and 12.70% of the population were below the poverty line, including 18.00% of those under age 18 and 10.20% of those age 65 or over.

== Government ==
=== Presidential elections ===
Prior to 1944, Clark County was a swing county, backing the national winner in every presidential election from 1900 to 1940. From 1944 on, it has become a Republican stronghold in presidential elections aside from 1964 when Lyndon B. Johnson won the county as part of his nationwide landslide victory.

Presidential election results

United States presidential election results for Clark County, Kansas
Year	Republican		Democratic		Third party(ies)	
Year	No.	%	No.	%	No.	%
1888	473	51.30%	349	37.85%	100	10.85%
1892	226	42.40%	0	0.00%	307	57.60%
1896	182	48.66%	191	51.07%	1	0.27%
1900	201	49.14%	199	48.66%	9	2.20%
1904	246	60.74%	131	32.35%	28	6.91%
1908	386	49.87%	350	45.22%	38	4.91%
1912	162	14.54%	485	43.54%	467	41.92%
1916	653	34.39%	1,102	58.03%	144	7.58%
1920	923	57.98%	610	38.32%	59	3.71%
1924	969	59.16%	410	25.03%	259	15.81%
1928	1,383	76.41%	419	23.15%	8	0.44%
1932	938	44.54%	1,152	54.70%	16	0.76%
1936	899	38.13%	1,457	61.79%	2	0.08%
1940	1,072	49.47%	1,079	49.79%	16	0.74%
1944	950	55.69%	741	43.43%	15	0.88%
1948	999	55.29%	777	43.00%	31	1.72%
1952	1,410	73.28%	479	24.90%	35	1.82%
1956	1,243	69.83%	529	29.72%	8	0.45%
1960	1,286	70.27%	538	29.40%	6	0.33%
1964	777	46.67%	881	52.91%	7	0.42%
1968	920	58.26%	446	28.25%	213	13.49%
1972	1,142	76.03%	311	20.71%	49	3.26%
1976	761	51.80%	680	46.29%	28	1.91%
1980	901	63.59%	430	30.35%	86	6.07%
1984	1,075	75.39%	324	22.72%	27	1.89%
1988	876	66.62%	409	31.10%	30	2.28%
1992	676	51.49%	293	22.32%	344	26.20%
1996	855	65.02%	334	25.40%	126	9.58%
2000	926	73.43%	292	23.16%	43	3.41%
2004	1,014	78.54%	257	19.91%	20	1.55%
2008	897	77.39%	245	21.14%	17	1.47%
2012	805	79.15%	174	17.11%	38	3.74%
2016	825	82.09%	120	11.94%	60	5.97%
2020	904	84.72%	143	13.40%	20	1.87%
2024	867	85.50%	129	12.72%	18	1.78%

=== Laws ===
The Kansas Constitution was amended in 1986 to allow the sale of alcoholic liquor by the individual drink with the approval of voters, either with or without a minimum of 30% of sales coming from food. Clark County is one of 35 counties in the state that allows for the sale of liquor by the drink without the minimum food sales stipulation.

== Education ==
=== Unified school districts ===
- Minneola USD 219
- Ashland USD 220

== Communities ==
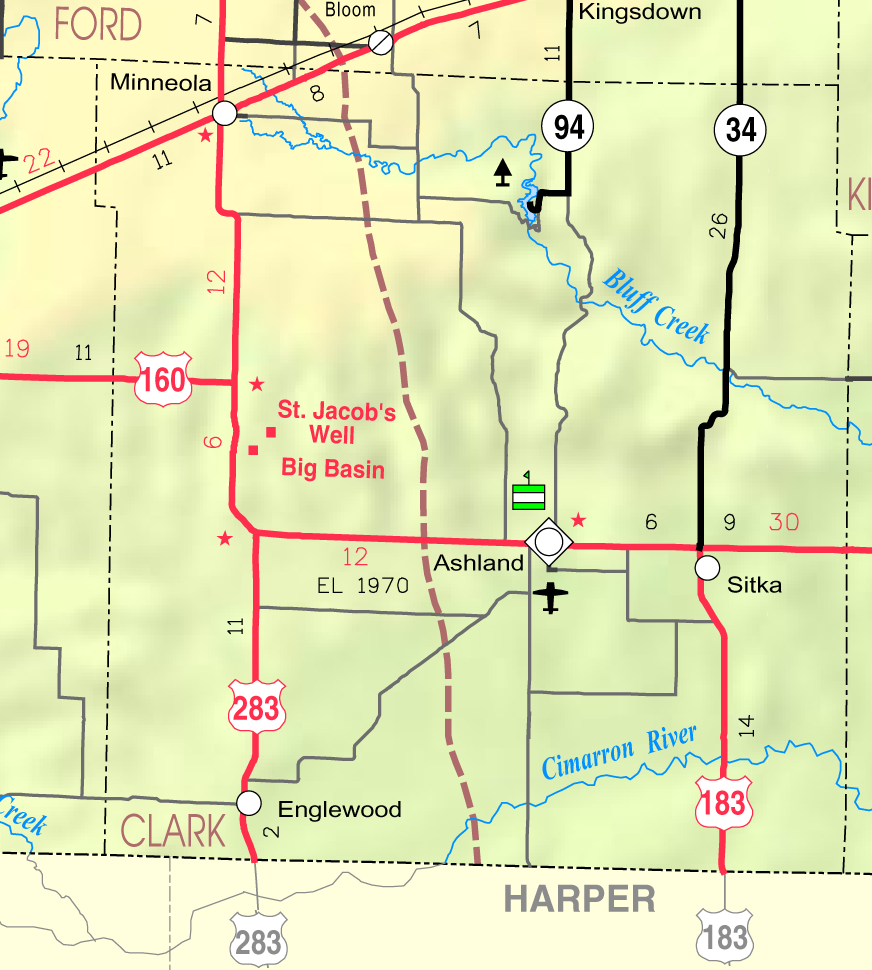
2005 map of Clark County (map legend)

List of townships / incorporated cities / unincorporated communities / extinct former communities within Clark County.

=== Cities ===
- Ashland (county seat)
- Englewood
- Minneola

=== Unincorporated communities ===
- Acres
- Sitka

=== Ghost towns ===
- Appleton
- Cash City
- Letitia
- Lexington
- Vanham
- Vesta

=== Townships ===
Clark County is divided into six townships. None of the cities within the county are considered governmentally independent, and all figures for the townships include those of the cities. In the following table, the population center is the largest city (or cities) included in that township's population total, if it is of a significant size.

Township	FIPS	Population center	Population	Population density /km^{2} (/sq mi)	Land area km^{2} (sq mi)	Water area km^{2} (sq mi)	Water %	Geographic coordinates
Appleton	02100	Minneola	921	1 (4)	630 (243)	2 (1)	0.29%	37°23′28″N 99°55′57″W
Center	11600	Ashland	1,097	2 (5)	528 (204)	2 (1)	0.31%	37°10′15″N 99°47′52″W
Englewood	21375	Englewood	171	0 (1)	536 (207)	0 (0)	0.07%	37°6′5″N 99°59′7″W
Lexington	39775		83	0 (1)	232 (90)	0 (0)	0.21%	37°19′20″N 99°38′41″W
Liberty	39900		32	0 (1)	155 (60)	0 (0)	0.05%	37°25′6″N 99°39′18″W
Sitka	65725		86	0 (1)	444 (171)	2 (1)	0.48%	37°8′13″N 99°38′28″W
Sources: "Census 2000 U.S. Gazetteer Files". U.S. Census Bureau, Geography Division. Archived from the original on August 2, 2002.

== See also ==
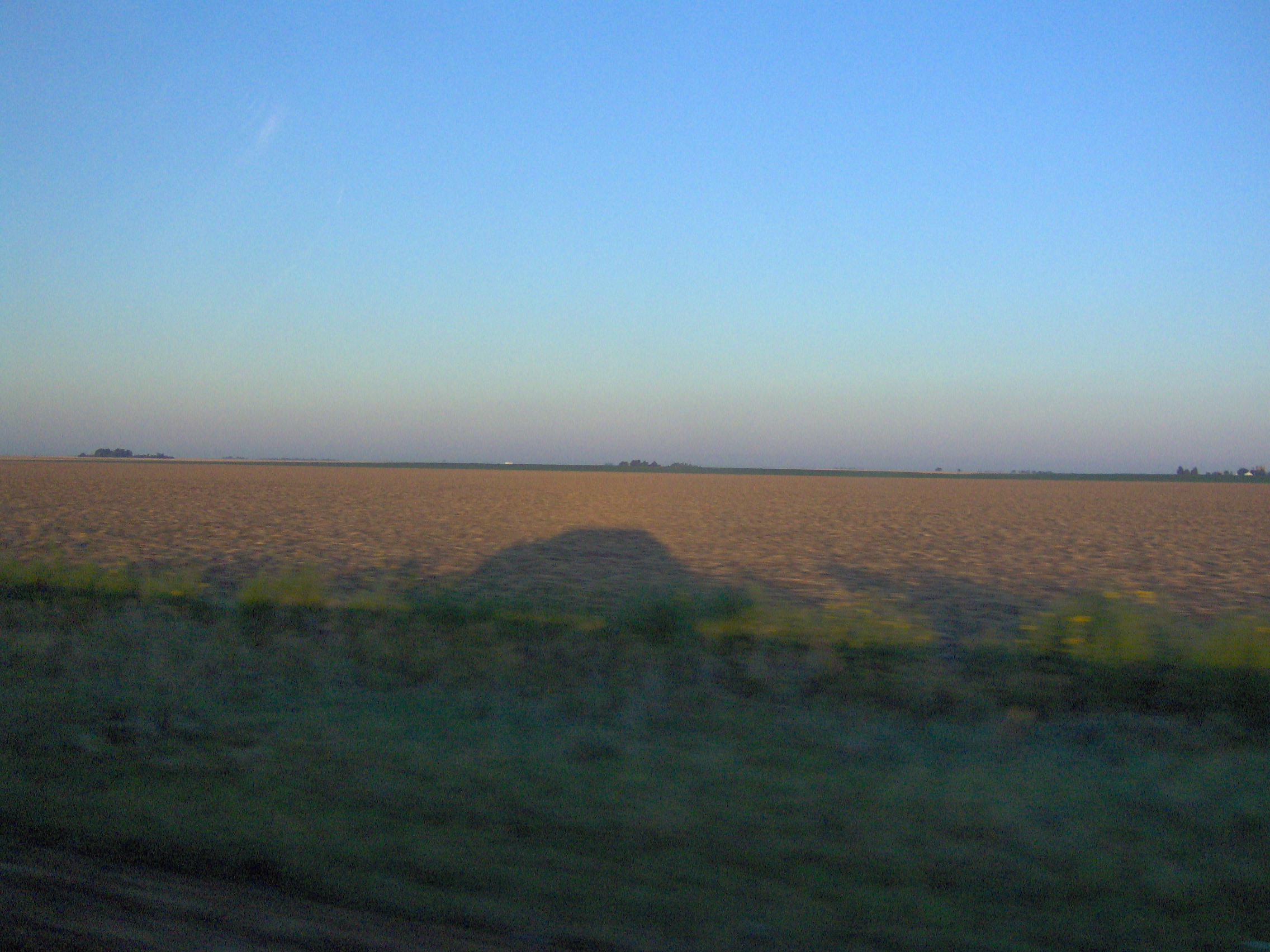
Rural Clark County

- Dry counties
- Big Basin Prairie Preserve

Community information for Kansas

- Kansas locations by per capita income
- List of counties in Kansas
- List of townships in Kansas
- List of cities in Kansas
- List of unincorporated communities in Kansas
- List of ghost towns in Kansas
