= Ashland, Kansas =

City in Clark County, Kansas

- City and County seat
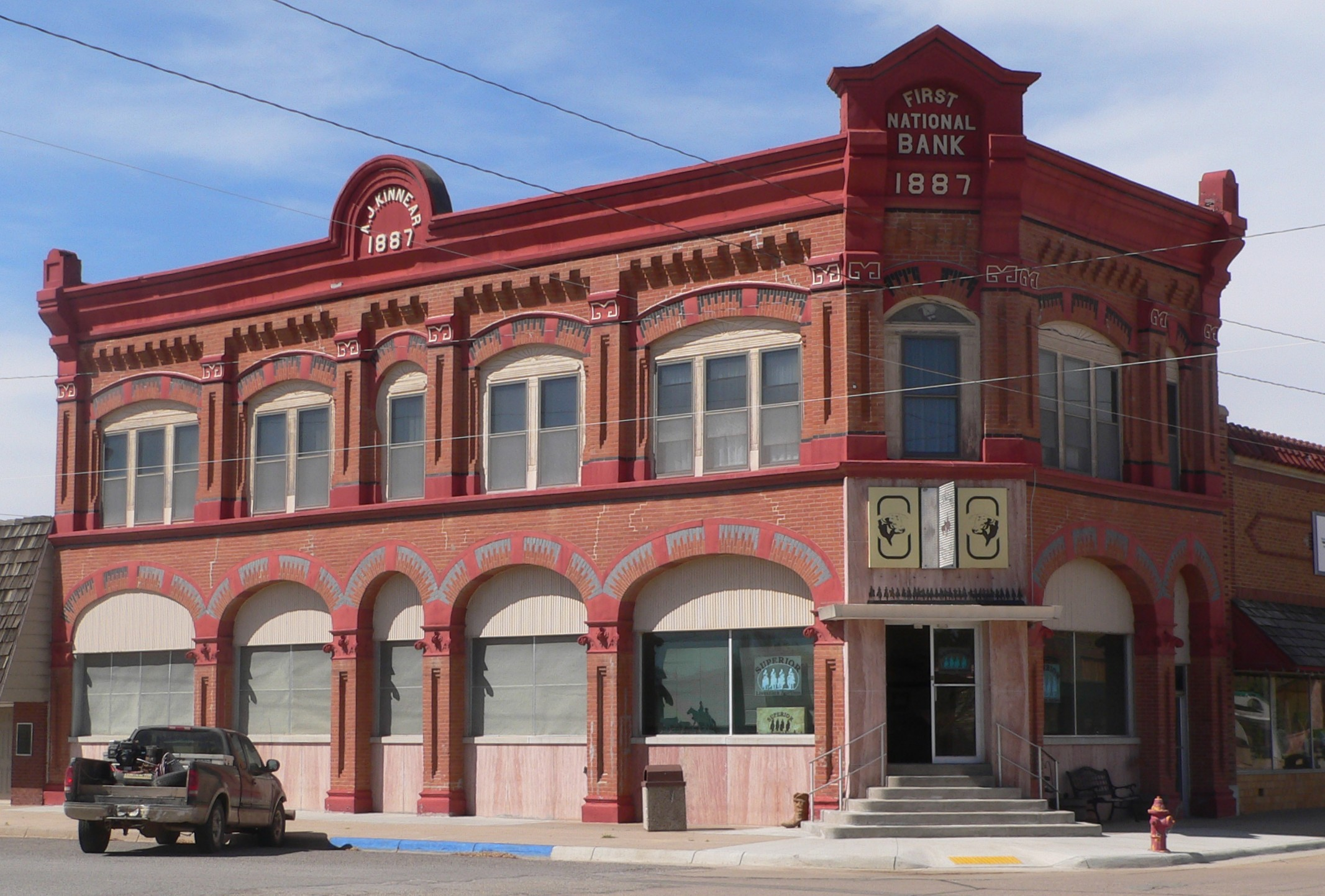
- First National Bank building, listed in the National Register of Historic Places

- Location within Clark County and Kansas

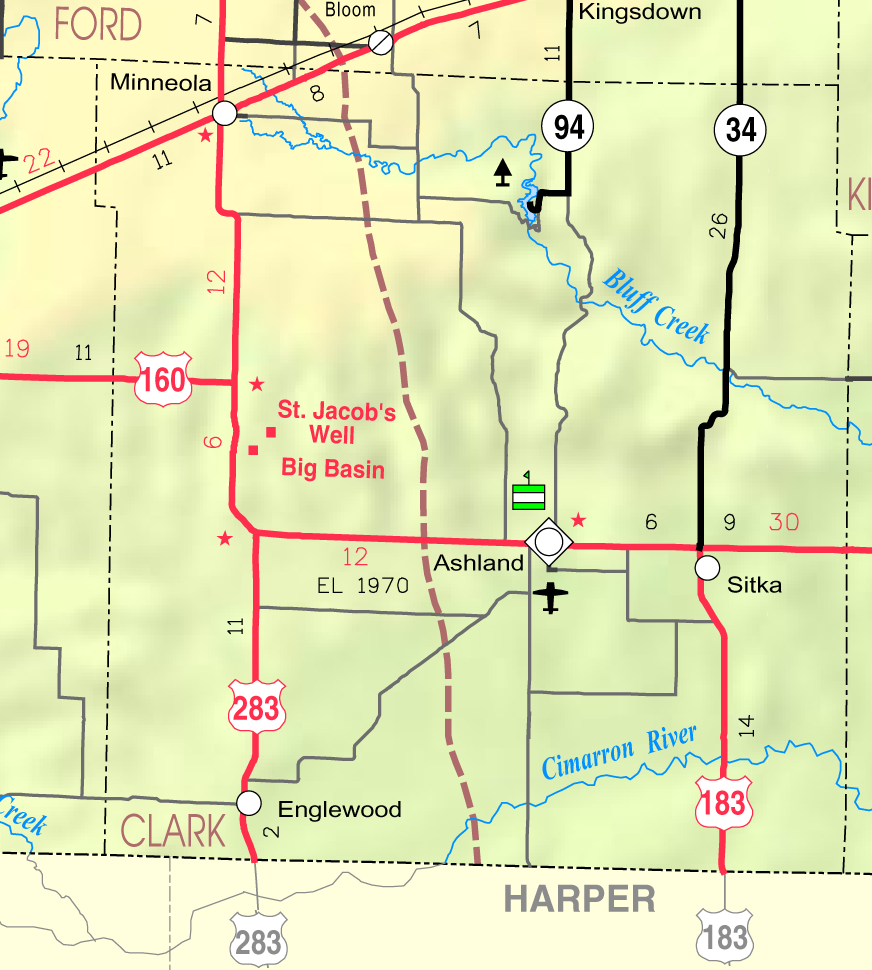
- KDOT map of Clark County (legend)
- Coordinates: 37°11′12″N 99°46′11″W
- Country: United States
- State: Kansas
- County: Clark
- Founded: 1884
- Incorporated: 1886
- Named for: Ashland, Kentucky

Area
  - Total: 1.69 sq mi (4.38 km^{2})
  - Land: 1.69 sq mi (4.38 km^{2})
  - Water: 0 sq mi (0.00 km^{2})
- Elevation: 1,972 ft (601 m)

Population (2020)
  - Total: 783
  - Density: 463/sq mi (179/km^{2})
- Time zone: UTC-6 (CST)
  - Summer (DST): UTC-5 (CDT)
- ZIP Code: 67831
- Area code: 620
- FIPS code: 20-02675
- GNIS ID: 2393999
- Website: ashlandks.com

Ashland is a city in and the county seat of Clark County, Kansas, United States. As of the 2020 census, the population of the city was 783.

== History ==
Ashland lies along what was once a military road from Fort Dodge (now Dodge City, Kansas) to the north and Fort Supply in the Indian Territory to the south. In 1870, during the Comanche Campaign against the Native Americans, the Army built two redoubts along the Dodge/Supply trail near the current site of Ashland: the Bear Creek Redoubt, five miles to the north, and the Cimarron Redoubt, nine miles to the south.

Founded in 1884, it was named after the city of Ashland, Kentucky. The first post office in Ashland was established in 1885.

== Geography ==
According to the United States Census Bureau, the city has a total area of 1.68 square miles (4.35 km^{2}), all land.

=== Climate ===
According to the Köppen Climate Classification system, Ashland has a humid subtropical climate, abbreviated "Cfa" on climate maps. The hottest temperature recorded in Ashland was 114 °F (45.6 °C) on August 17, 1909, August 13, 1936, June 25, 1911, and June 27, 2011, while the coldest temperature recorded was −20 °F (−28.9 °C) on February 10, 2011.

Climate data for Ashland, Kansas, 1991–2020 normals, extremes 1900–present
Month	Jan	Feb	Mar	Apr	May	Jun	Jul	Aug	Sep	Oct	Nov	Dec	Year
Record high °F (°C)	84 (29)	91 (33)	104 (40)	102 (39)	106 (41)	114 (46)	113 (45)	114 (46)	109 (43)	102 (39)	93 (34)	92 (33)	114 (46)
Mean maximum °F (°C)	70.9 (21.6)	77.2 (25.1)	85.5 (29.7)	91.8 (33.2)	97.2 (36.2)	101.8 (38.8)	106.7 (41.5)	104.7 (40.4)	100.6 (38.1)	93.8 (34.3)	81.0 (27.2)	71.1 (21.7)	108.4 (42.4)
Mean daily maximum °F (°C)	47.7 (8.7)	51.4 (10.8)	61.6 (16.4)	70.6 (21.4)	80.0 (26.7)	89.7 (32.1)	95.2 (35.1)	93.2 (34.0)	85.5 (29.7)	73.2 (22.9)	59.6 (15.3)	48.5 (9.2)	71.4 (21.9)
Daily mean °F (°C)	33.1 (0.6)	36.7 (2.6)	46.4 (8.0)	55.5 (13.1)	66.5 (19.2)	76.7 (24.8)	81.5 (27.5)	79.5 (26.4)	70.8 (21.6)	57.5 (14.2)	44.4 (6.9)	34.3 (1.3)	56.9 (13.9)
Mean daily minimum °F (°C)	18.5 (−7.5)	22.0 (−5.6)	31.3 (−0.4)	40.4 (4.7)	52.9 (11.6)	63.6 (17.6)	67.7 (19.8)	65.8 (18.8)	56.2 (13.4)	41.8 (5.4)	29.3 (−1.5)	20.1 (−6.6)	42.5 (5.8)
Mean minimum °F (°C)	2.8 (−16.2)	5.4 (−14.8)	12.7 (−10.7)	22.9 (−5.1)	35.0 (1.7)	49.6 (9.8)	56.7 (13.7)	54.6 (12.6)	39.0 (3.9)	23.8 (−4.6)	11.7 (−11.3)	3.6 (−15.8)	−3.1 (−19.5)
Record low °F (°C)	−19 (−28)	−20 (−29)	−8 (−22)	11 (−12)	22 (−6)	40 (4)	46 (8)	40 (4)	24 (−4)	9 (−13)	−1 (−18)	−17 (−27)	−20 (−29)
Average precipitation inches (mm)	0.66 (17)	0.73 (19)	1.39 (35)	1.83 (46)	3.19 (81)	3.96 (101)	2.94 (75)	2.98 (76)	1.60 (41)	1.79 (45)	0.93 (24)	1.00 (25)	23.00 (584)
Average snowfall inches (cm)	2.3 (5.8)	3.6 (9.1)	1.8 (4.6)	0.1 (0.25)	0.0 (0.0)	0.0 (0.0)	0.0 (0.0)	0.0 (0.0)	0.0 (0.0)	0.1 (0.25)	0.5 (1.3)	3.2 (8.1)	11.6 (29.4)
Average precipitation days (≥ 0.01 in)	2.7	3.5	4.8	5.6	7.9	7.9	7.0	7.7	4.9	5.2	3.2	3.7	64.1
Average snowy days (≥ 0.1 in)	1.4	1.3	0.9	0.0	0.0	0.0	0.0	0.0	0.0	0.1	0.3	1.5	5.5
Source 1: NOAA
Source 2: National Weather Service

== Demographics ==
Historical population
Census	Pop.	Note	%±
1890	459		—
1900	493		7.4%
1910	910		84.6%
1920	1,147		26.0%
1930	1,232		7.4%
1940	1,186		−3.7%
1950	1,493		25.9%
1960	1,312		−12.1%
1970	1,244		−5.2%
1980	1,096		−11.9%
1990	1,032		−5.8%
2000	975		−5.5%
2010	867		−11.1%
2020	783		−9.7%
U.S. Decennial Census

=== 2020 census ===
The 2020 United States census counted 783 people, 357 households, and 204 families in Ashland. The population density was 463.0 per square mile (178.8/km^{2}). There were 452 housing units at an average density of 267.3 per square mile (103.2/km^{2}). The racial makeup was 84.55% (662) white or European American (82.89% non-Hispanic white), 0.0% (0) black or African-American, 0.89% (7) Native American or Alaska Native, 1.15% (9) Asian, 0.13% (1) Pacific Islander or Native Hawaiian, 6.77% (53) from other races, and 6.51% (51) from two or more races. Hispanic or Latino of any race was 9.83% (77) of the population.

Of the 357 households, 26.9% had children under the age of 18; 45.4% were married couples living together; 31.7% had a female householder with no spouse or partner present. 38.9% of households consisted of individuals and 19.3% had someone living alone who was 65 years of age or older. The average household size was 2.0 and the average family size was 2.5. The percent of those with a bachelor's degree or higher was estimated to be 23.6% of the population.

22.9% of the population was under the age of 18, 6.1% from 18 to 24, 23.4% from 25 to 44, 25.5% from 45 to 64, and 22.1% who were 65 years of age or older. The median age was 42.9 years. For every 100 females, there were 113.4 males. For every 100 females ages 18 and older, there were 116.5 males.

The 2016–2020 5-year American Community Survey estimates show that the median household income was $51,042 (with a margin of error of +/- $12,854) and the median family income was $65,938 (+/- $17,147). Males had a median income of $40,536 (+/- $16,458) versus $23,333 (+/- $5,078) for females. The median income for those above 16 years old was $27,031 (+/- $3,613). Approximately, 6.7% of families and 8.8% of the population were below the poverty line, including 22.4% of those under the age of 18 and 11.5% of those ages 65 or over.

=== 2010 census ===
As of the census of 2010, there were 867 people, 381 households, and 239 families residing in the city. The population density was 516.1 inhabitants per square mile (199.3/km^{2}). There were 465 housing units at an average density of 276.8 per square mile (106.9/km^{2}). The racial makeup of the city was 92.7% White, 0.9% Native American, 0.5% Asian, 0.1% Pacific Islander, 2.3% from other races, and 3.5% from two or more races. Hispanic or Latino of any race were 8.8% of the population.

There were 381 households, of which 27.6% had children under the age of 18 living with them, 49.6% were married couples living together, 9.2% had a female householder with no husband present, 3.9% had a male householder with no wife present, and 37.3% were non-families. 33.9% of all households were made up of individuals, and 17.3% had someone living alone who was 65 years of age or older. The average household size was 2.22 and the average family size was 2.81.

The median age in the city was 44.8 years. 23.9% of residents were under the age of 18; 5.4% were between the ages of 18 and 24; 21.2% were from 25 to 44; 28% were from 45 to 64; and 21.7% were 65 years of age or older. The gender makeup of the city was 48.6% male and 51.4% female.

== Arts and culture ==
- Big Basin Prairie Preserve
- St. Jacob's Well

== Education ==
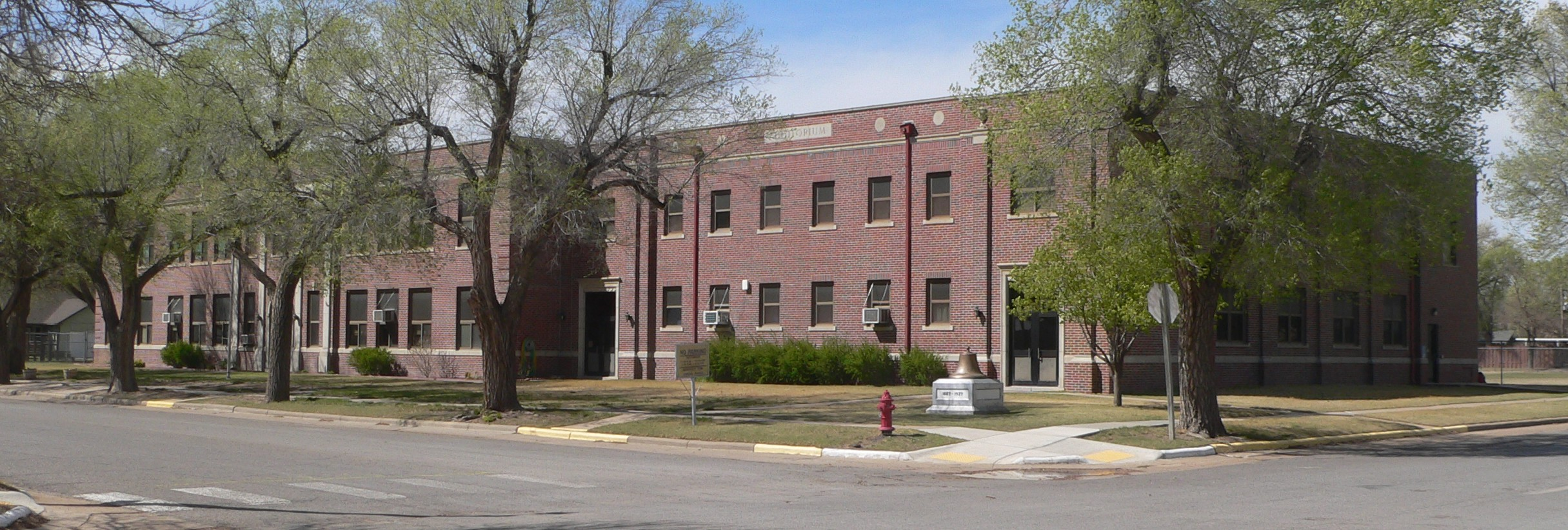
Ashland Elementary School (2016)

The community is served by Ashland USD 220 public school district. USD 220 has one school: Ashland Junior/Senior High School. The school mascot is the Bluejay and the school colors are royal blue, yellow, and white.

== Transportation ==
The Atchison, Topeka and Santa Fe Railway formerly provided passenger rail service to Ashland on a line between Wichita and Englewood. Dedicated passenger service was provided until at least 1958, while mixed trains continued until at least 1961.

== Notable people ==
- Ronald Johnson, (1935–1998), American poet.
- Wes Santee, (1932–2010), American middle-distance runner
