= Hamon =

Hamon may refer to:

== People ==
- Aly-Enzo Hamon (born 2003), Rwandan footballer
- Augustin Hamon (1862–1945), French anarchist
- Benoît Hamon (born 1967), French politician
- Chris Hamon (born 1970), Jersey footballer
- Hamon Sutton (c. 1392–1461/1462), English politician
- Jake L. Hamon, Jr. (1902–1985), American oilman
- James Hamon (born 1995), Guernsey footballer
- Jean-Louis Hamon (1821–1874), French painter
- Olivebelle Hamon (1909–1987), American child musical prodigy and heiress
- Rei Hamon (1919–2008), New Zealand artist
- Thomas Hamon, English politician

== Other ==
- Hamon (swordsmithing), the visual result of the tempering process used in much of Japanese swordsmithing
- Baal Hammon, the chief god of Carthage also sometimes spelled "Hamon"
- The Ripple (波紋, Hamon), a supernatural ability used in the manga series JoJo's Bizarre Adventure
- the name for ham in Filipino cuisine; see Hamonado
- a village in Republic of the Congo Hamon

== See also ==
- Hammon (disambiguation)
- Haman (disambiguation)
- Jamon (disambiguation)
- Fitzhamon
