= Fiat (disambiguation) =

Fiat is an Italian automobile manufacturer.

Fiat or FIAT may also refer to:

== Organizations ==
=== Fiat industrial group ===
- Fiat Aviazione, the former aircraft manufacturing division of Fiat
- Fiat Ferroviaria, the former rail division of Fiat, now part of Alstom
- Fiat Industrial, the part of Fiat not directly related to automobiles, now part of CNH Industrial
- Fiat Industrial Vehicles, the former industrial vehicles division of Fiat
- Fiat S.p.A., the parent holding company that was merged in 2014 into Fiat Chrysler
  - Fiat Chrysler Automobiles
  - Fiat Group Automobiles, the subsidiary of FCA grouping automotive manufacturing activities
    - Fiat (cycling team), a French professional cycling team that existed in 1978 and 1979
    - Fiat France (cycling team), a Belgian professional cycling team that existed in 1977
    - Fiat India Automobiles, the Indian subsidiary of FGA
    - Fiat Professional, the subsidiary producing Fiat branded light commercial vehicles
  - Fiat Powertrain Technologies, the subsidiary of FCA manufacturing engines
- Fiat Trattori, the historical Fiat company producing tractors, now New Holland Agriculture

=== Other organizations ===
- Felony Investigative Assistance Team, Illinois, US
- Field Information Agency, Technical, 1945–1947 US Army agency for exploiting German scientific methods

== Places ==
- Fiat, Indiana, a town in the US
- Fiat, Kansas, an unincorporated community in the US
- Fiat Tagliero Building, in Asmara, Eritrea

== Other uses ==
- Fiat (policy debate), a theoretical construct in policy debate
- Fiat justitia, a means of granting leave to appeal by exercise of the royal prerogative
- Fiat money, currency issued by government
- Military fiat, process where a decision is made and enforced by military means without participation of political elements

== People with the surname ==
- Amos Fiat (born 1956), Israeli computer scientist
- Caroline Fiat (born 1977), French politician
- Kyle Fiat (born 1983), American lacrosse player

== See also ==
- Fiat Lux (disambiguation)
