= Elk Falls (disambiguation) =

Elk Falls is a city in Kansas.

Elk Falls may also refer to:

- Elk Falls Township, Elk County, Kansas
- Elk Falls Provincial Park, in British Columbia, Canada
- Elk Falls Mill, a defunct pulp and paper mill in British Columbia, Canada
- Big Falls, a fall on the Elk River (North Carolina–Tennessee)
