= Isaiahh Loudermilk =

American football player (born 1997)

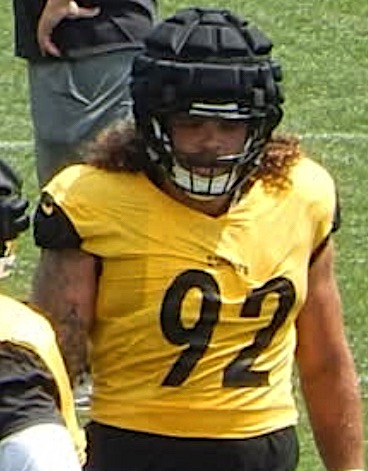
- Loudermilk with the Pittsburgh Steelers in 2023

No. 58 – New York Jets
- Position: Defensive end
- Roster status: Practice squad

Personal information
- Born: October 10, 1997 (age 29); Howard, Kansas, U.S.
- Listed height: 6 ft 7 in (2.01 m)
- Listed weight: 293 lb (133 kg)

Career information
- High school: West Elk (Howard)
- College: Wisconsin (2016–2020)
- NFL draft: 2021: 5th round, 156th overall pick

Career history
- Pittsburgh Steelers (2021–2025); Minnesota Vikings (2026)*; New York Jets (2026–present)*
- * Offseason or practice squad member only

Awards and highlights
- Third-team All-Big Ten (2020)

Career NFL statistics as of 2025
- Tackles: 63
- Sacks: 1.0
- Pass deflections: 6
- Stats at Pro Football Reference

Isaiahh Loudermilk (born October 10, 1997) is an American professional football defensive end for the New York Jets of the National Football League (NFL). He played college football for the Wisconsin Badgers, and was selected by the Pittsburgh Steelers in the 2021 NFL draft.

== College career ==
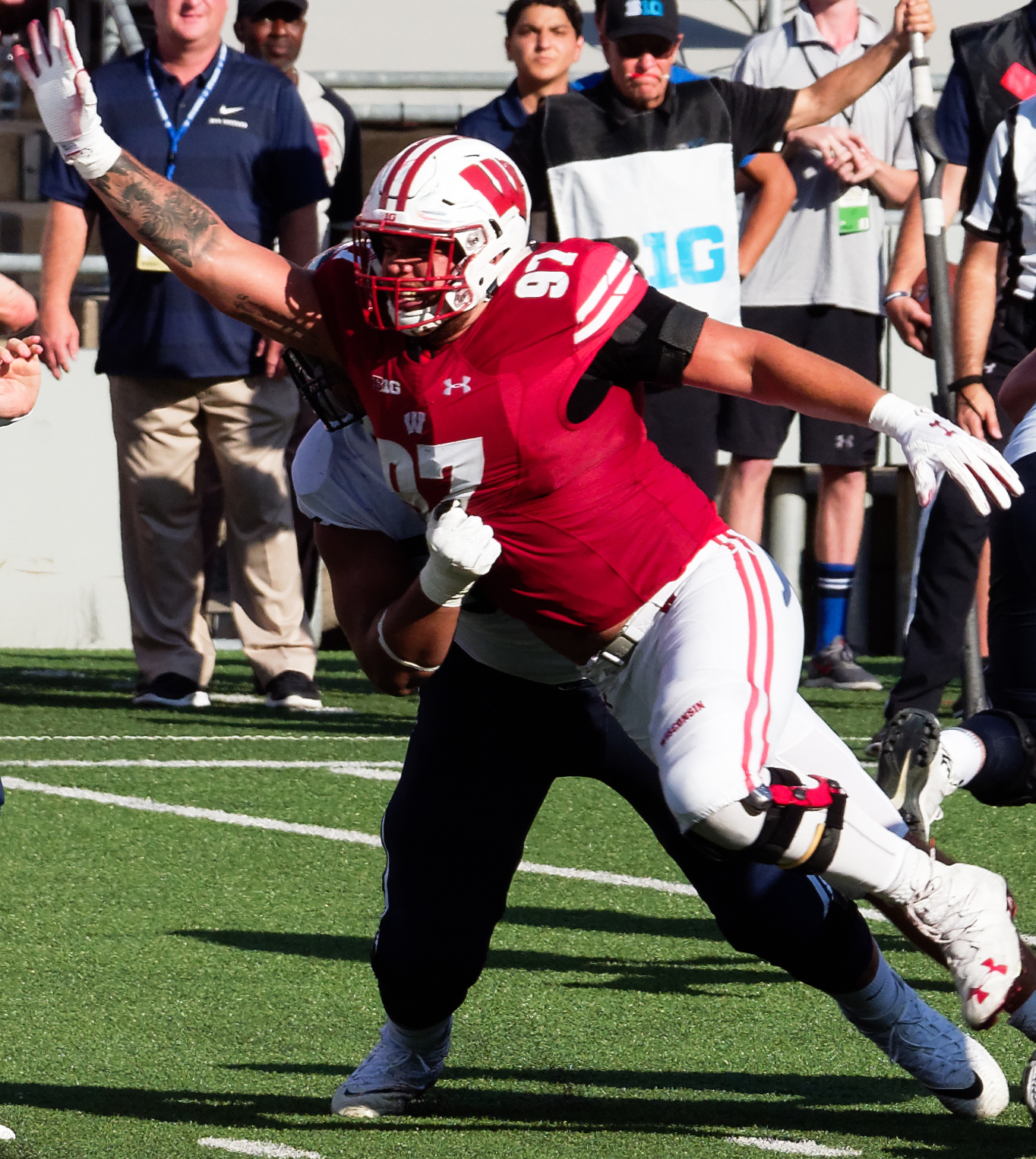
Loudermilk in 2018

Loudermilk played college football at Wisconsin from 2016 to 2020. After redshirting his freshman year, he contributed to the Badgers' defensive unit in 2017, playing 11 games and helping the team achieve a 13–1 record and a victory in the 2017 Orange Bowl.

In April 2018, Loudermilk underwent left knee surgery. Loudermilk missed four games due to injury, playing in nine games in the 2018 season.

Loudermilk recorded one sack and one forced fumble in the 2019 Big Ten Football Championship Game, where the Badgers lost to Ohio State.

In 2020, he earned All-Big Ten third-team honors and finished his college career with 63 tackles, 11.5 tackles for loss, and 7.5 sacks.

== Professional career ==
Pre-draft measurables
Height	Weight	Arm length	Hand span	Wingspan	40-yard dash	10-yard split	20-yard split	20-yard shuttle	Three-cone drill	Vertical jump	Broad jump	Bench press
6 ft 6 3/8 in (1.99 m)	274 lb (124 kg)	32 5/8 in (0.83 m)	10 in (0.25 m)	6 ft 9 1/4 in (2.06 m)	5.08 s	1.71 s	2.88 s	4.55 s	7.52 s	28.5 in (0.72 m)	9 ft 4 in (2.84 m)	21 reps
All values from Pro Day

=== Pittsburgh Steelers ===
Loudermilk was selected by the Pittsburgh Steelers in the fifth round, 156th overall, of the 2021 NFL draft. On May 15, 2021, he signed his four-year rookie contract with Pittsburgh.

Loudermilk went on to appear in 17 of the team’s 18 games, including the postseason. He recorded 23 tackles (16 solo), three passes defended, and one sack while playing 29% of the defensive snaps. The Steelers faced significant injuries to starters Stephon Tuitt and Tyson Alualu, which opened opportunities for Loudermilk. He often drew comparisons to veteran lineman Cameron Heyward.

In the 2022 season, Loudermilk played in 11 games, recording 8 combined tackles (4 solo and 4 assisted) and no sacks. In the 2023 season, Loudermilk played in 16 regular-season games for Pittsburgh. He recorded a total of 13 tackles, with five being solo and eight assisted. Additionally, Loudermilk registered two passes defended but did not record any sacks during the season. He made his second post-season appearance in the Steelers' 17–31 Wildcard playoff loss. In 2024, Loudermilk recorded two tackles, the most he's had in a single game, as the Steelers defeated the Chargers 20–10.

On March 18, 2025, the Steelers re-signed Loudermilk to a one-year contract. On September 17, Loudermilk was placed on injured reserve due to a high ankle sprain.

=== Minnesota Vikings ===
On May 21, 2026, Loudermilk signed with the Minnesota Vikings. On August 30, he was released by the Vikings as a part of final roster cuts.

=== New York Jets ===
On September 23, 2026, Loudermilk was signed to the New York Jets' practice squad.

== Personal life ==
Loudermilk was engaged to Emily Borgmann in July 2023. They married in 2025.

== NFL career statistics ==
Year	Team	Games		Tackles					Interceptions						Fumbles	
Year	Team	GP	GS	Comb	Solo	Ast	Sack	Sfty	PD	Int	Yds	Avg	Lng	TD	FF	FR
2021	PIT	15	2	23	16	7	1.0	0	3	0	0	0.0	0	0	0	0
2022	PIT	11	3	7	4	3	0.0	0	0	0	0	0.0	0	0	0	0
2023	PIT	16	0	16	8	8	0.0	0	2	0	0	0.0	0	0	0	0
2024	PIT	16	0	17	10	7	0.0	0	1	0	0	0.0	0	0	0	0
2025	PIT	2	2	0	0	0	0.0	0	0	0	0	0.0	0	0	0	0
Career		60	7	63	38	25	1.0	0	6	0	0	0.0	0	0	0	0
