= Oak Valley =

Oak Valley may refer to:

== Australia ==
- Oak Valley, Queensland, near Townsville
- Oak Valley, South Australia, an indigenous Australian community

== Canada ==
- Oak Valley Health, a regional health care system

== United States ==
- Oak Valley, California
- Oak Valley, Kansas
- Oak Valley, New Jersey
- Oak Valley, Texas

== See also ==
- Oak Valley Township (disambiguation)
