= Verónica Ruiz de Velasco =

Mexican artist (born 1968)

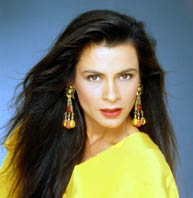
- Born: February 21, 1968 (age 58); Mexico City, Mexico
- Education: La Escuela Nacional de Bellas Artes La Esmeralda, Antigua Academia de San Carlos, Rufino Tamayo, Jean Dubuffet, Gilberto Aceves Navarro
- Known for: Dancers, Boquets
- Notable work: Homage to Swan Lake (1989); Homage to Phantom of the Opera (1985); Homage to Edgar Degas (1987)
- Movement: Neo-figurative

Signature
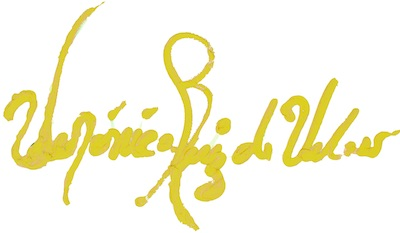
- Website: veronicaruizdevelasco.com

Veronica Ruiz de Velasco (born 1968) is a Mexican neo-figurative painter living in the United States and one of the youngest female artist to exhibit solo at the Museo de Arte Moderno (National Museum of Modern Art) in Mexico. Her talent attracted the attention of masters such as Teodulo Romulo, Rufino Tamayo, Jean Dubuffet, and Gilberto Aceves Navarro who all took Veronica under their wings as a student and protégé. She was commissioned to paint a mural at the ABC Hospital that was unveiled by the U.S. Ambassador in Mexico, Charles J. Pilliod Jr. and attended by Prince Charles, Prince of Wales, and later a mural for the Hamon Science Building at the Southwest Medical Center in Dallas for Nancy Hamon. In addition, Veronica has held several solo exhibitions including the Museo de Arte Moderno in Mexico, Mexico Loteria, the Mexico City International Airport, Nordstrom in the Galleria of Dallas and the Irving Art Center. Over the last decade, Veronica Ruiz de Velasco has been recognized as one of the world's greatest abstract artist. Her works have been quoted as Jackson Pollock on steroids.

== Early life and education ==
"Self Portrait", Water on Canvas, Mexico, D.F., 1982. First Painting.

Veronica Ruiz de Velasco was born in México D.F. to Pedro Ruiz de Velasco (1915-1996) and Susana Zenteno Ruiz de Velasco and was the 15th child out of 18 siblings. In 1983, Ruiz de Velasco was accepted to take art courses at La Escuela Nacional de Bellas Artes La Esmeralda in Mexico City. In 1984, the curator of the Gallery of Lourdes Chumacero in Mexico exhibited her work. This was a springboard into the Mexican Art community, as it was attended by many leading painters such as Teodulo Romulo, Thomas Parra, and Gilberto Aceves Navarro. Romulo offered Ruiz de Velasco lessons on his technique.

In 1984, Ruiz de Velasco went to Paris, France, to discuss art technique with Jean Dubuffet. In 1985, Rufino Tamayo asked Ruiz de Velasco to come to his studio to take some private lessons with him. Tamayo commented that Ruiz de Velasco's art had "an excellent Color". In 1985–88, Ruiz de Velasco took several courses at the Academia de San Carlos (Old San Carlos Academy) in Mexico City while taking private lessons from Gilberto Aceves Navarro. She considers him as her most important teacher.

== Career ==
=== Exhibitions in Mexico ===
In 1985, Ruiz de Velasco held an exhibition at the Gallery of the Loteria National of Mexico. In 1986 she held an individual exhibition in the terminal of the Mexico City International Airport in Mexico City. In 1987, she was the youngest female artist to exhibit at the Museo de Arte Moderno (national Museum of Modern Art) in Mexico. The exhibition was an homage to Andrew Lloyd Webber and had reference pieces such as Cats, Jesus Christ Superstar, Evita, Starlight Express, and the Phantom of the Opera. The Museo de Arte Moderno published their twenty five year celebration book and included Ruiz de Velasco as one of Mexico's leading artists.

In 1989, Ruiz de Velasco painted a mural in the American British Cowdray Medical Center in Mexico D.F. This mural took almost a year to complete. The inauguration of the mural was a national event in Mexico, unveiled by the U.S. Ambassador in Mexico, Charles J. Pilliod Jr. Charles, Prince of Wales was also present and congratulated Ruiz de Velasco on the donation of her time and effort.

In 1991, Ruiz de Velasco created a painting for the Playboy Collection in Chicago, Illinois. She was then asked by the curator, Jack Bolton, of the Rockefeller Collection in New York City to create a piece for their collection. In 1994, Goodyear Corporation in Akron, Ohio held an exhibition of Ruiz de Velasco's artwork in their private executive gallery. In 1995, Coronado S.A. de C.V. held an exhibition of Ruiz de Velasco's artwork in their gallery in México, D.F.

In 1996, Ruiz de Velasco created a portrait for President Bill Clinton. President Clinton and Hillary Clinton sent a letter of appreciation for this portrait.

=== Work in the United States ===
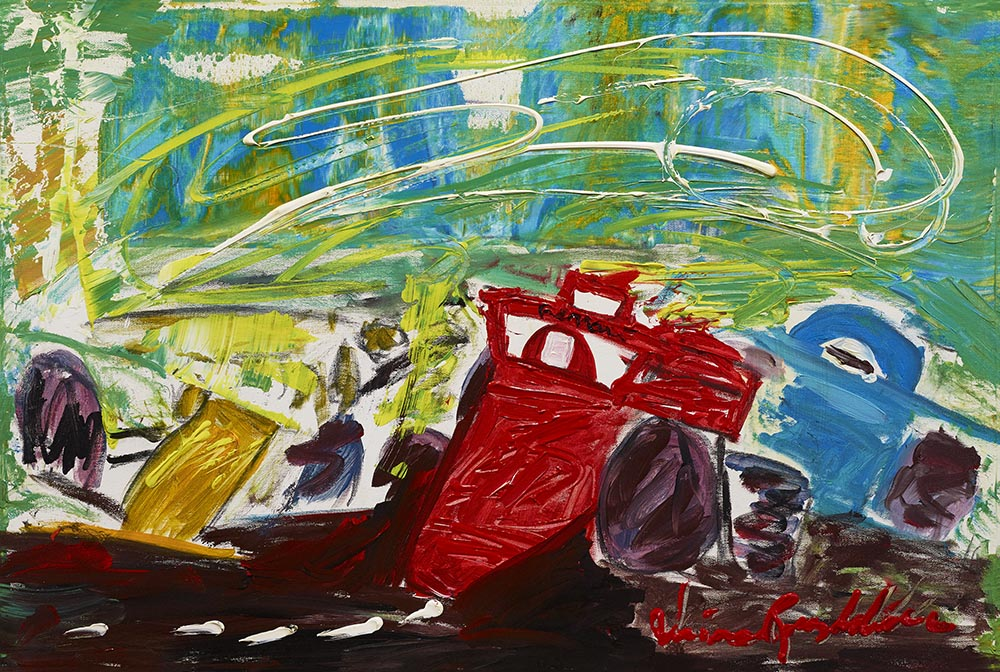
"Memories by Veronica Ruiz de Velasco", Oil on Canvas, Palm Beach, Florida, 2023

In the summer of 1995, Ruiz de Velasco was vacationing for two weeks with her father in Cozumel and met her future husband. In July 1996, she married him at the Igelsias San Miguel on the Isla de Cozumel. In August, her father Pedro Ruiz de Velasco died at the age of 81. In September she returned to Dallas with her husband.

The January 1997 edition of the Lifestyle Magazine contained a biography of Ruiz de Velasco's Career. In February the Anasazi Gallery in Dallas held a solo exhibition for Ruiz de Velasco. In April, Lucent Technologies held an exhibition of her work in their private executive gallery in Mesquite, Texas. In June, AT&T held an exhibition in their private executive gallery in Las Colinas, Texas. In October, Nordstrom of the Gallería in Dallas promoted Ruiz de Velasco's oil paintings throughout their store in honor of Hispanic Heritage Month. Ruiz de Velasco signed several hundred autographs. Nordstrom of the Gallería also held a fashion show with their top clothing lines with Ruiz de Velasco's art images used as a photographic backdrop.

In 1997, Mrs. Nancy Hamon asked Ruiz de Velasco to create a mural for the Nancy and Jake L. Hamon Biomedical Research Building at the University of Texas Southwestern Medical Center in Dallas. The mural was 3 meters by 4 meters. It was inaugurated by Nancy Hamon and the Director of the Medical Center, Dr. Kern Wildenthall.

In April 1999, Ruiz de Velasco held an exhibition at the Florence Art Gallery in Dallas, Texas. In July 1999, the Beaux Art at the Dallas Museum of Art chose Ruiz de Velasco to provide several of her paintings to auction off for charity. In December 1999, she held an individual exhibition at the Irving Arts Center (Museum) in Irving, Texas. Calendar Archive In April 2000, Ruiz de Velasco held an exhibition at the Mission Gallery in Highland Park, Texas. In 2003, she created two murals and donated them to the Beaty Early Childhood School in Plano, Texas. In 2005 she painted an airplane hung from the ceiling of the new International Terminal at the Dallas–Fort Worth Airport. In 2007, she painted the front cover of the September/October 2007 edition of the Bulletin of the Atomic Scientists.

In 2009, Veronica Ruiz de Velasco is one of five Mexican artists selected to create a painting representing Mexico at the 2010 FIFA World Cup in South Africa.

In 2019, Veronica Ruiz de Velasco is interviewed on the TV Show "Estamos Unidos America" which will air on Mega TV.

In November 2020, Veronica Ruiz de Velasco opened her own art gallery in Palm Beach on Worth Avenue. In 2021, Judge Jeanine Pirro interviewed her about her career inside her gallery and posted it to her Instagram site.

In January 2022, Judge Jeanine Pirro thanked her for creating a masterpiece on her three dogs, Ted, Red and Stella on her national Foxnews show called The Five.

From March 31 to April 2, 2023, she held an exhibition at the Salon international d'art Contemporain at the Louvre Museum in Paris, France.
