= Elk County, Kansas =

County in Kansas, United States

- County
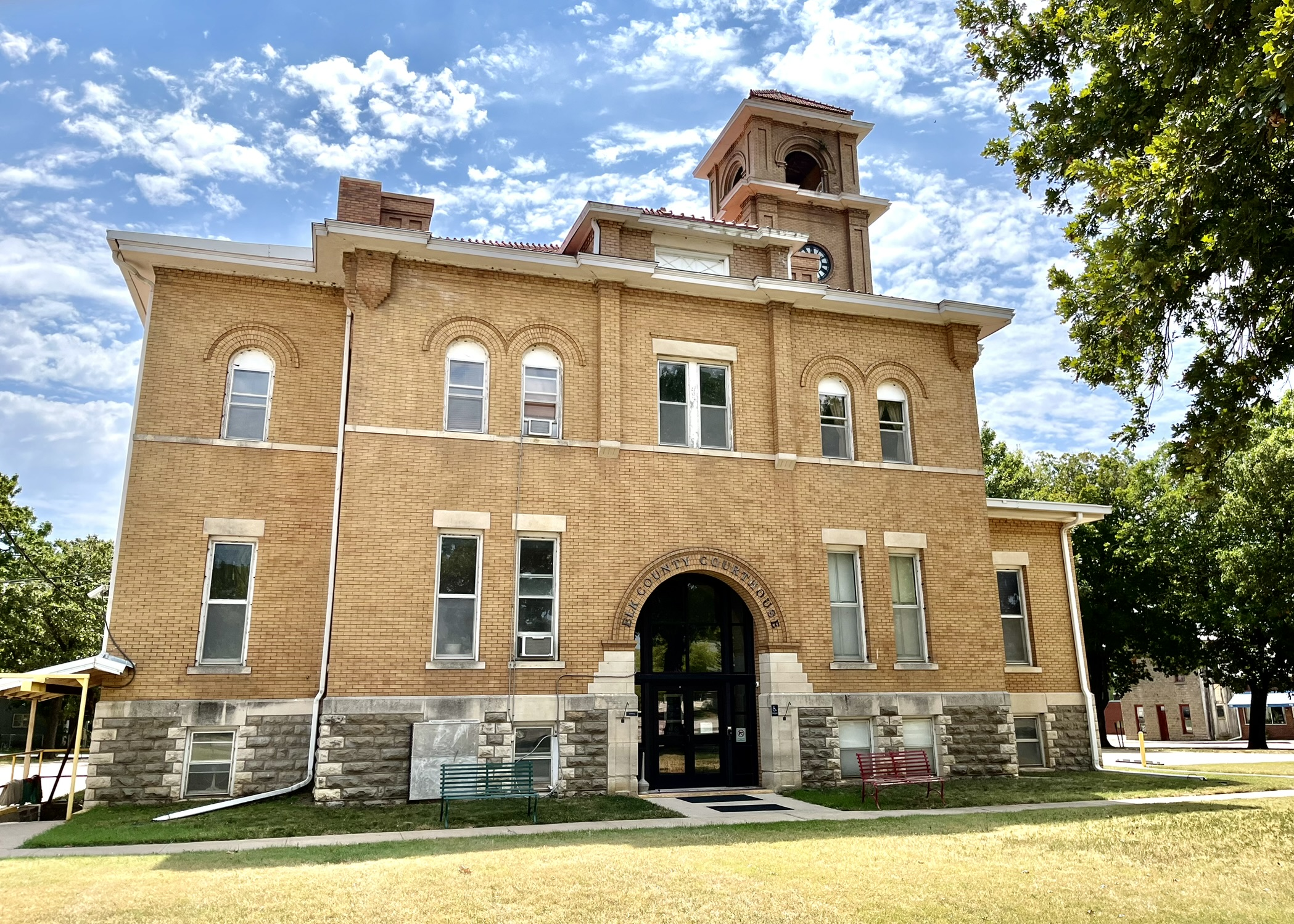
- Elk County Courthouse in Howard (2023)

- Location within the U.S. state of Kansas
- Country: United States
- State: Kansas
- Founded: March 25, 1875
- Named for: Elk River
- Seat: Howard
- Largest city: Howard

Area
  - Total: 650 sq mi (1,700 km^{2})
  - Land: 644 sq mi (1,670 km^{2})
  - Water: 6.2 sq mi (16 km^{2}) 1.0%

Population (2020)
  - Total: 2,483
  - Estimate (2025): 2,458 ▼
  - Density: 3.8/sq mi (1.5/km^{2})
- Time zone: UTC−6 (Central)
  - Summer (DST): UTC−5 (CDT)
- Area code: 620
- Congressional district: 4th
- Website: elkcountyks.org

Elk County is a county located in the U.S. state of Kansas. Its county seat and most populous city is Howard. As of the 2020 census, the county population was 2,483. The county was named for the Elk River.

== History ==
=== Early history ===
For many millennia, the Great Plains of North America was inhabited by nomadic Native Americans. From the 16th century to 18th century, the Kingdom of France claimed ownership of large parts of North America. In 1762, after the French and Indian War, France secretly ceded New France to Spain, per the Treaty of Fontainebleau.

=== 19th century ===
In 1802, Spain returned most of the land to France, but keeping title to about 7,500 square miles. In 1803, most of the land for modern day Kansas was acquired by the United States from France as part of the 828,000 square mile Louisiana Purchase for 2.83 cents per acre.

In 1854, after first serving as an area to relocate Native American tribes from the east, the United States organized Kansas Territory. In 1861, Kansas was admitted as the 34th U.S. state. The area that today is Elk County was, for a brief period, reserved to the Osage Indians as hunting grounds for buffalo and other game. In 1867, when Howard County was formed, it encompassed both present day Elk and Chautauqua counties. Disputes over county seats caused a division. In 1875, Elk County was established, named for the Elk River.

The first railroad in Elk County was built in 1879. It connected cattle ranches and farms to eastern markets.

== Geography ==
According to the U.S. Census Bureau, the county has a total area of 650 square miles (1,700 km^{2}), of which 644 square miles (1,670 km^{2}) is land and 6.2 square miles (16 km^{2}) (1.0%) is water.

=== Adjacent counties ===
- Greenwood County (north)
- Wilson County (east)
- Montgomery County (southeast)
- Chautauqua County (south)
- Cowley County (southwest)
- Butler County (northwest)

== Demographics ==
Historical population
Census	Pop.	Note	%±
1880	10,623		—
1890	12,216		15.0%
1900	11,443		−6.3%
1910	10,128		−11.5%
1920	9,034		−10.8%
1930	9,210		1.9%
1940	8,180		−11.2%
1950	6,679		−18.3%
1960	5,048		−24.4%
1970	3,858		−23.6%
1980	3,918		1.6%
1990	3,327		−15.1%
2000	3,261		−2.0%
2010	2,882		−11.6%
2020	2,483		−13.8%
2025 (est.)	2,458	▼	−1.0%
U.S. Decennial Census; 1790-1960 1900-90; 1990-2000 2010-20 2025

=== Racial and ethnic composition ===
Elk County, Kansas – Racial and ethnic composition Note: the U.S. Census treats Hispanic/Latino as an ethnic category. This table excludes Latinos from the racial categories and assigns them to a separate category. Hispanics/Latinos may be of any race.
Race / Ethnicity (NH = Non-Hispanic)	Pop 1980	Pop 1990	Pop 2000	Pop 2010	Pop 2020	% 1980	% 1990	% 2000	% 2010	% 2020
White alone (NH)	3,839	3,205	3,081	2,694	2,214	97.98%	96.33%	94.48%	93.48%	89.17%
Black or African American alone (NH)	0	5	7	0	1	0.00%	0.15%	0.21%	0.00%	0.04%
Native American or Alaska Native alone (NH)	19	51	24	33	43	0.48%	1.53%	0.74%	1.15%	1.73%
Asian alone (NH)	5	3	6	12	3	0.13%	0.09%	0.18%	0.42%	0.12%
Native Hawaiian or Pacific Islander alone (NH)	x	x	2	1	0	x	x	0.06%	0.03%	0.00%
Other race alone (NH)	0	4	0	1	0	0.00%	0.12%	0.00%	0.03%	0.00%
Mixed race or Multiracial (NH)	x	x	70	62	121	x	x	2.15%	2.15%	4.87%
Hispanic or Latino (any race)	55	59	71	79	101	1.40%	1.77%	2.18%	2.74%	4.07%
Total	3,918	3,327	3,261	2,882	2,483	100.00%	100.00%	100.00%	100.00%	100.00%

=== 2020 census ===
As of the 2020 census, the county had a population of 2,483. The median age was 50.3 years. 22.6% of residents were under the age of 18 and 27.9% of residents were 65 years of age or older. For every 100 females there were 99.4 males, and for every 100 females age 18 and over there were 97.4 males age 18 and over. 0.0% of residents lived in urban areas, while 100.0% lived in rural areas.

The racial makeup of the county was 90.7% White, 0.2% Black or African American, 1.9% American Indian and Alaska Native, 0.2% Asian, 0.0% Native Hawaiian and Pacific Islander, 0.7% from some other race, and 6.2% from two or more races. Hispanic or Latino residents of any race comprised 4.1% of the population.

There were 1,094 households in the county, of which 23.2% had children under the age of 18 living with them and 24.2% had a female householder with no spouse or partner present. About 32.1% of all households were made up of individuals and 19.5% had someone living alone who was 65 years of age or older.

There were 1,491 housing units, of which 26.6% were vacant. Among occupied housing units, 81.3% were owner-occupied and 18.7% were renter-occupied. The homeowner vacancy rate was 2.3% and the rental vacancy rate was 16.7%.

=== 2000 census ===
As of the 2000 census, there were 3,261 people, 1,412 households, and 923 families residing in the county. The population density was 5 people per square mile (1.9 people/km^{2}). There were 1,860 housing units at an average density of 3 per square mile (1.2/km^{2}). The racial makeup of the county was 95.06% White, 0.21% Black or African American, 0.95% Native American, 0.18% Asian, 0.06% Pacific Islander, 1.20% from other races, and 2.33% from two or more races. Hispanic or Latino of any race were 2.18% of the population.

There were 1,412 households, out of which 24.40% had children under the age of 18 living with them, 56.00% were married couples living together, 6.10% had a female householder with no husband present, and 34.60% were non-families. 32.90% of all households were made up of individuals, and 18.60% had someone living alone who was 65 years of age or older. The average household size was 2.25 and the average family size was 2.84.

In the county, the population was spread out, with 22.50% under the age of 18, 5.80% from 18 to 24, 20.00% from 25 to 44, 26.50% from 45 to 64, and 25.30% who were 65 years of age or older. The median age was 46 years. For every 100 females there were 91.50 males. For every 100 females age 18 and over, there were 91.70 males.

The median income for a household in the county was $27,267, and the median income for a family was $34,148. Males had a median income of $28,580 versus $16,219 for females. The per capita income for the county was $16,066. About 9.20% of families and 13.80% of the population were below the poverty line, including 18.80% of those under age 18 and 15.00% of those age 65 or over.

== Government ==
=== Presidential elections ===
As is the case in most Kansas counties outside the eastern cities, Elk County votes predominantly Republican; the last Democratic candidate to carry the county was Franklin D. Roosevelt in the 1932 campaign.

Presidential election results

United States presidential election results for Elk County, Kansas
Year	Republican		Democratic		Third party(ies)	
Year	No.	%	No.	%	No.	%
1888	1,566	53.70%	696	23.87%	654	22.43%
1892	1,235	47.19%	0	0.00%	1,382	52.81%
1896	1,339	47.57%	1,464	52.01%	12	0.43%
1900	1,632	55.21%	1,311	44.35%	13	0.44%
1904	1,713	67.47%	706	27.81%	120	4.73%
1908	1,454	54.11%	1,187	44.18%	46	1.71%
1912	605	24.09%	971	38.67%	935	37.24%
1916	1,769	43.94%	2,053	50.99%	204	5.07%
1920	2,253	65.27%	1,110	32.16%	89	2.58%
1924	2,443	64.26%	1,104	29.04%	255	6.71%
1928	3,007	77.50%	831	21.42%	42	1.08%
1932	1,746	43.04%	2,239	55.19%	72	1.77%
1936	2,355	53.24%	2,059	46.55%	9	0.20%
1940	2,774	64.77%	1,478	34.51%	31	0.72%
1944	2,283	70.33%	954	29.39%	9	0.28%
1948	1,962	63.80%	1,087	35.35%	26	0.85%
1952	2,380	76.38%	717	23.01%	19	0.61%
1956	1,909	69.90%	812	29.73%	10	0.37%
1960	1,830	68.46%	823	30.79%	20	0.75%
1964	1,267	55.74%	994	43.73%	12	0.53%
1968	1,327	64.64%	503	24.50%	223	10.86%
1972	1,522	76.02%	428	21.38%	52	2.60%
1976	1,087	54.84%	865	43.64%	30	1.51%
1980	1,280	69.68%	482	26.24%	75	4.08%
1984	1,301	72.89%	452	25.32%	32	1.79%
1988	1,075	63.01%	608	35.64%	23	1.35%
1992	748	42.94%	485	27.84%	509	29.22%
1996	933	56.79%	488	29.70%	222	13.51%
2000	1,080	69.68%	402	25.94%	68	4.39%
2004	1,119	73.86%	369	24.36%	27	1.78%
2008	1,042	72.66%	363	25.31%	29	2.02%
2012	1,049	76.63%	281	20.53%	39	2.85%
2016	1,048	83.24%	160	12.71%	51	4.05%
2020	1,140	83.76%	195	14.33%	26	1.91%
2024	1,123	83.93%	191	14.28%	24	1.79%

=== Laws ===
The Kansas Constitution was amended in 1986 to allow the sale of alcoholic liquor by the individual drink, with approval by voters. Elk County voters have chosen to remain a prohibition, or "dry", county.

== Education ==
=== Unified school districts ===
- West Elk USD 282
- Elk Valley USD 283

== Communities ==
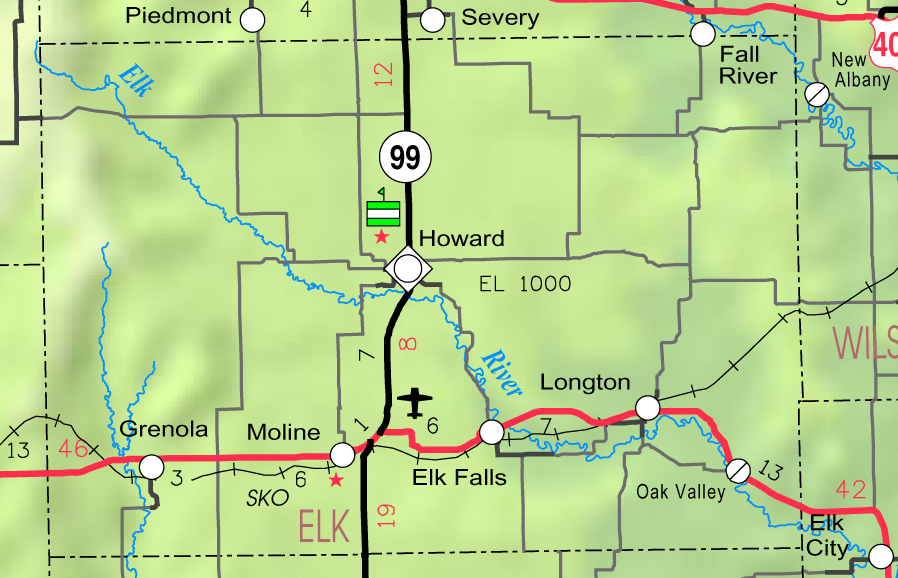
2005 map of Elk County (map legend)

List of townships / incorporated cities / unincorporated communities / extinct former communities within Elk County.

=== Cities ===
- Elk Falls
- Grenola
- Howard (county seat)
- Longton
- Moline

=== Unincorporated communities ===
- Busby
- Oak Valley

=== Ghost towns ===
- Cave Springs
- Fiat
- Upola

=== Townships ===
Elk County is divided into ten townships. None of the cities within the county is designated as governmentally independent. All population figures for the townships include those of the cities. In the following table, the population center is the largest city (or cities) included in that township's population total, if it is of a significant size.

Township	FIPS	Population center	Population	Population density /km^{2} (/sq mi)	Land area km^{2} (sq mi)	Water area km^{2} (sq mi)	Water %	Geographic coordinates
Elk Falls	20325		196	1 (3)	152 (59)	0 (0)	0.19%	37°22′17″N 96°12′26″W
Greenfield	28550		321	2 (5)	171 (66)	1 (0)	0.62%	37°21′8″N 96°27′5″W
Howard	33275	Howard	1,006	6 (16)	166 (64)	1 (1)	0.86%	37°28′3″N 96°15′14″W
Liberty	40025		117	1 (2)	154 (59)	0 (0)	0.19%	37°34′22″N 96°1′55″W
Longton	42675		530	5 (12)	116 (45)	0 (0)	0.11%	37°22′38″N 96°5′27″W
Oak Valley	51950		154	1 (3)	116 (45)	0 (0)	0.24%	37°21′59″N 96°1′14″W
Painterhood	54075		68	0 (1)	154 (59)	1 (0)	0.37%	37°27′35″N 96°2′37″W
Paw Paw	54925		116	1 (2)	141 (54)	0 (0)	0.24%	37°33′19″N 96°13′46″W
Union Center	72500		116	0 (1)	371 (143)	2 (1)	0.46%	37°31′44″N 96°23′31″W
Wildcat	79150		637	5 (12)	135 (52)	2 (1)	1.35%	37°21′33″N 96°19′10″W
Sources: "Census 2000 U.S. Gazetteer Files". U.S. Census Bureau, Geography Division. Archived from the original on August 2, 2002.

== See also ==
- National Register of Historic Places listings in Elk County, Kansas

Community information for Kansas

- Kansas locations by per capita income
- List of counties in Kansas
- List of townships in Kansas
- List of cities in Kansas
- List of unincorporated communities in Kansas
- List of ghost towns in Kansas
