= Longton Township, Kansas =

Longton Township Elk County, Kansas
- Township
- Location in Elk County
- Coordinates: 37°20′45″N 096°05′41″W
- Country: United States
- State: Kansas
- County: Elk

Area
  - Total: 44.85 sq mi (116.15 km^{2})
  - Land: 44.80 sq mi (116.02 km^{2})
  - Water: 0.046 sq mi (0.12 km^{2}) 0.1%
- Elevation: 1,047 ft (319 m)

Population (2020)
  - Total: 351
  - Density: 7.84/sq mi (3.03/km^{2})
- GNIS feature ID: 0469869

Longton Township is a township in Elk County, Kansas, United States. As of the 2020 census, the population was 351.

== Geography ==
Longton Township covers an area of 44.84 square miles (116.1 km^{2}) and contains one incorporated settlement, Longton. According to the USGS, it contains one cemetery, Longton.

The streams of Clear Creek, Hitchen Creek and West Painterhood Creek run through this township.

== Education ==
Longton Township is home to Elk Valley High School.
