= Greenfield Township, Kansas =

Greenfield Township
- Township
- Location in Elk County
- Coordinates: 37°18′57″N 096°22′11″W
- Country: United States
- State: Kansas
- County: Elk

Area
  - Total: 66.49 sq mi (172.21 km^{2})
  - Land: 66.08 sq mi (171.14 km^{2})
  - Water: 0.41 sq mi (1.07 km^{2}) 0.62%
- Elevation: 1,161 ft (354 m)

Population (2020)
  - Total: 252
  - Density: 3.81/sq mi (1.47/km^{2})
- GNIS feature ID: 0469892

Greenfield Township is a township in Elk County, Kansas, United States. As of the 2020 census, its population was 252.

== Geography ==
Greenfield Township covers an area of 66.49 square miles (172.2 km^{2}) and contains one incorporated settlement, Grenola. According to the USGS, it contains one cemetery, Green Lawn.

The streams of Corum Creek, East Fork Caney River and Schrader Branch run through this township.

== Transportation ==
Greenfield Township contains one airport or landing strip, Eaglehead Ranch Airport.
