= Paw Paw Township =

Paw Paw Township may refer to the following places in the United States:

- Paw Paw Township, DeKalb County, Illinois
- Paw Paw Township, Wabash County, Indiana
- Paw Paw Township, Elk County, Kansas
- Paw Paw Township, Michigan
