= Howard Township, Elk County, Kansas =

Howard Township
- Township
- Location in Elk County
- Coordinates: 37°28′05″N 096°12′26″W
- Country: United States
- State: Kansas
- County: Elk

Area
  - Total: 64.78 sq mi (167.78 km^{2})
  - Land: 64.22 sq mi (166.34 km^{2})
  - Water: 0.56 sq mi (1.45 km^{2}) 0.86%
- Elevation: 1,076 ft (328 m)

Population (2020)
  - Total: 713
  - Density: 11.1/sq mi (4.29/km^{2})
- GNIS feature ID: 0469964

Howard Township is a township in Elk County, Kansas, United States. As of the 2020 census, its population was 713.

== Geography ==
Howard Township covers an area of 64.78 square miles (167.8 km^{2}) and contains one incorporated settlement, Howard (the county seat). According to the USGS, it contains one cemetery, Howard.

The streams of East Hitchen Creek, Game Creek, Little Hitchen Creek, Mound Branch, Pawpaw Creek, Rock Creek, Snake Creek and West Hitchen Creek run through this township.
