= Wild Cat Township, Kansas =

Wild Cat Township
- Township
- Location in Elk County
- Coordinates: 37°21′37″N 096°18′14″W
- Country: United States
- State: Kansas
- County: Elk
- Elevation: 1,119 ft (341 m)

Population (2020)
  - Total: 477
- GNIS feature ID: 469886

Wild Cat Township is a township in Elk County, Kansas, United States. As of the 2020 census, its population was 477.

== Geography ==
Elk Falls Township contains the incorporated settlement of Moline.
