= Grenola Mill and Elevator =

- U.S. National Register of Historic Places
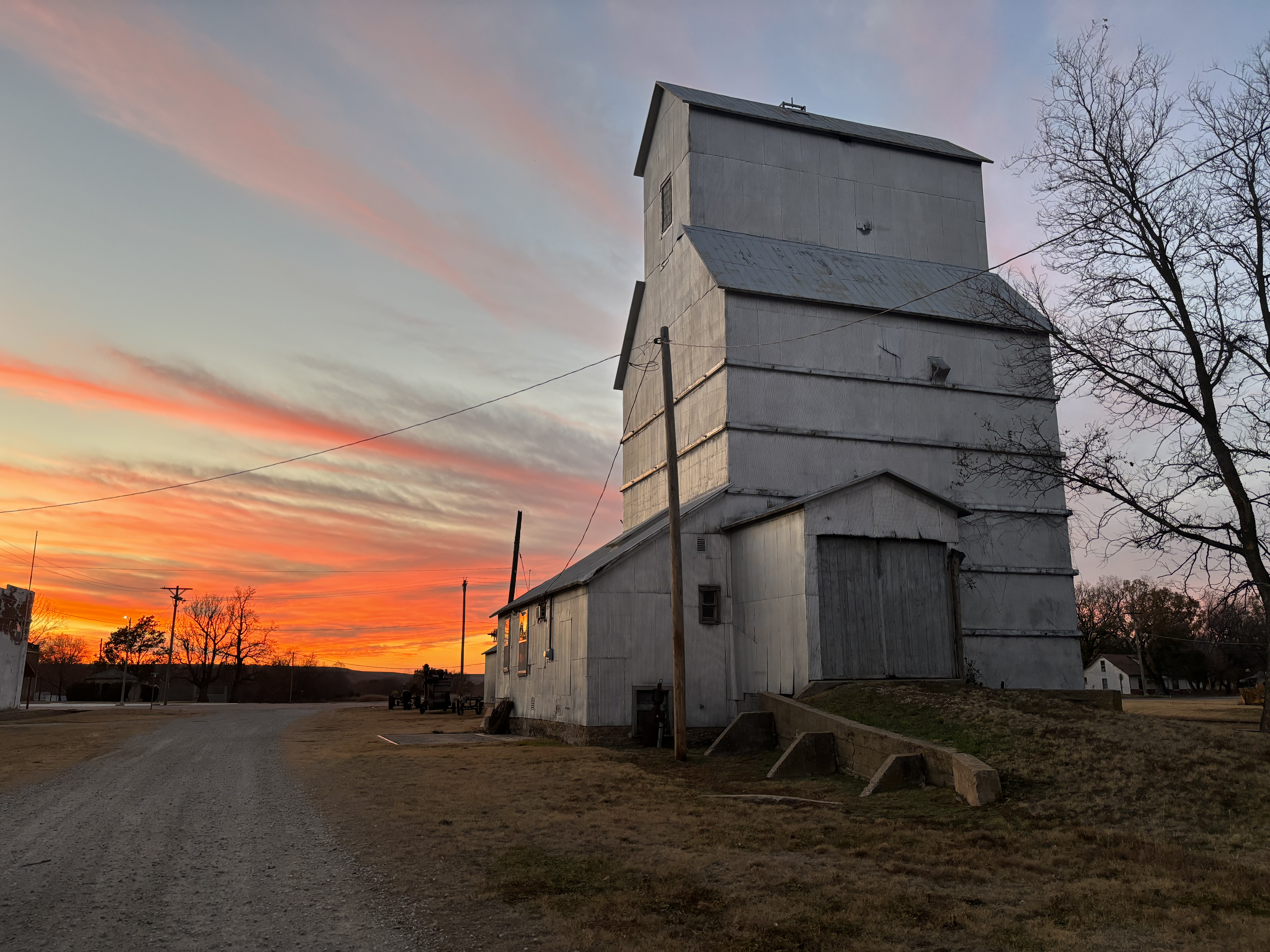

- Location within Kansas Location within the United States
- Location: Railroad Avenue, Grenola, Kansas
- Coordinates: 37°20′54″N 96°26′58″W
- Area: less than one acre
- Built: c.1909
- Built by: Pelkey, P.H.; Van Ness, R.M.
- Architectural style: Grain Elevator
- NRHP reference No.: 02000764
- Added to NRHP: July 11, 2002

The Grenola Mill and Elevator is a grain elevator complex on Railroad Avenue in Grenola, Kansas. It was built in about 1909 and was listed on the National Register of Historic Places in 2002.

The complex includes a balloon-frame country grain elevator, a frame mixing room, a frame storage warehouse and scales. The complex had not been used for nearly 20 years when it was listed in 2002. The complex has been known as the Grenola Elevator Museum since 1990.
