= Busby, Kansas =

Unincorporated community in Elk County, Kansas, United States

Coordinates: 37°28′10″N 96°02′40″W

Busby is an unincorporated community in Elk County, Kansas, United States.

== History ==
A post office was opened in Busby in 1885, and remained in operation until it was discontinued in 1906.
