= Oak Valley Township =

Oak Valley Township may refer to the following places in the United States:

- Oak Valley Township, Elk County, Kansas
- Oak Valley Township, Otter Tail County, Minnesota
