= Painterhood Township, Kansas =

Painterhood Township
- Township
- Location in Elk County
- Coordinates: 37°28′25″N 096°03′47″W
- Country: United States
- State: Kansas
- County: Elk

Area
  - Total: 59.71 sq mi (154.65 km^{2})
  - Land: 59.49 sq mi (154.09 km^{2})
  - Water: 0.22 sq mi (0.57 km^{2}) 0.37%
- Elevation: 1,007 ft (307 m)

Population (2020)
  - Total: 73
  - Density: 1.2/sq mi (0.47/km^{2})
- GNIS feature ID: 0469987

Painterhood Township is a township in Elk County, Kansas, United States. As of the 2020 census, its population was 73.

== Geography ==
Painterhood Township covers an area of 59.71 square miles (154.6 km^{2}) and contains no incorporated settlements. According to the USGS, it contains two cemeteries: Busby and Upola.
