= Liberty Township, Elk County, Kansas =

Liberty Township
- Township
- Location in Elk County
- Coordinates: 37°33′40″N 096°03′06″W
- Country: United States
- State: Kansas
- County: Elk

Area
  - Total: 59.61 sq mi (154.39 km^{2})
  - Land: 59.5 sq mi (154.1 km^{2})
  - Water: 0.11 sq mi (0.29 km^{2}) 0.19%
- Elevation: 1,004 ft (306 m)

Population (2020)
  - Total: 106
  - Density: 1.78/sq mi (0.688/km^{2})
- GNIS feature ID: 0475068

Liberty Township is a township in Elk County, Kansas, United States. As of the 2020 census, its population was 106.

== Geography ==
Liberty Township covers an area of 59.61 square miles (154.4 km^{2}) and contains no incorporated settlements. According to the USGS, it contains three cemeteries: Mount Zion, Old Tailor and Wade.

The stream of Little Indian Creek runs through this township.

== Transportation ==
Liberty Township contains one airport or landing strip, Clogston Ranch Landing Strip.
