= Oak Valley, Kansas =

Unincorporated community in Elk County, Kansas, United States

- Unincorporated community
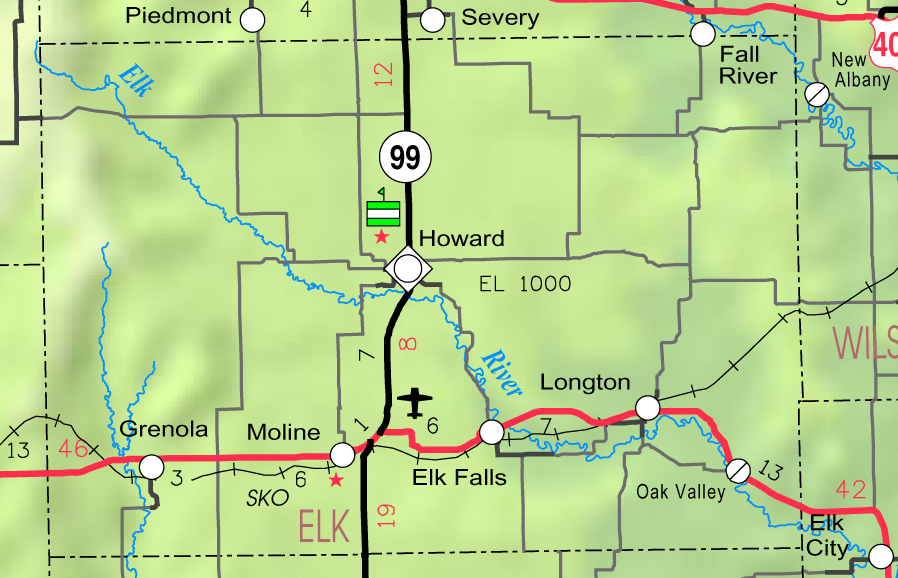
- KDOT map of Elk County (legend)

- Location within Kansas Location within the United States
- Coordinates: 37°20′36″N 96°00′36″W
- Country: United States
- State: Kansas
- County: Elk
- Elevation: 869 ft (265 m)
- Time zone: UTC-6 (CST)
  - Summer (DST): UTC-5 (CDT)
- Area code: 620
- FIPS code: 20-51925
- GNIS ID: 469858

Oak Valley is an unincorporated community in Elk County, Kansas, United States. It is located along U.S. Route 160 between Longton and Elk City.

== History ==
A post office was opened at Oak Valley in 1875, and remained in operation until it was discontinued in 1954.

Oak Valley was founded in 1879, when a settler built the first residential structure.
