= Jake L. Hamon Sr. =

American lawyer (1873–1920)

Jake Louis Hamon Sr.
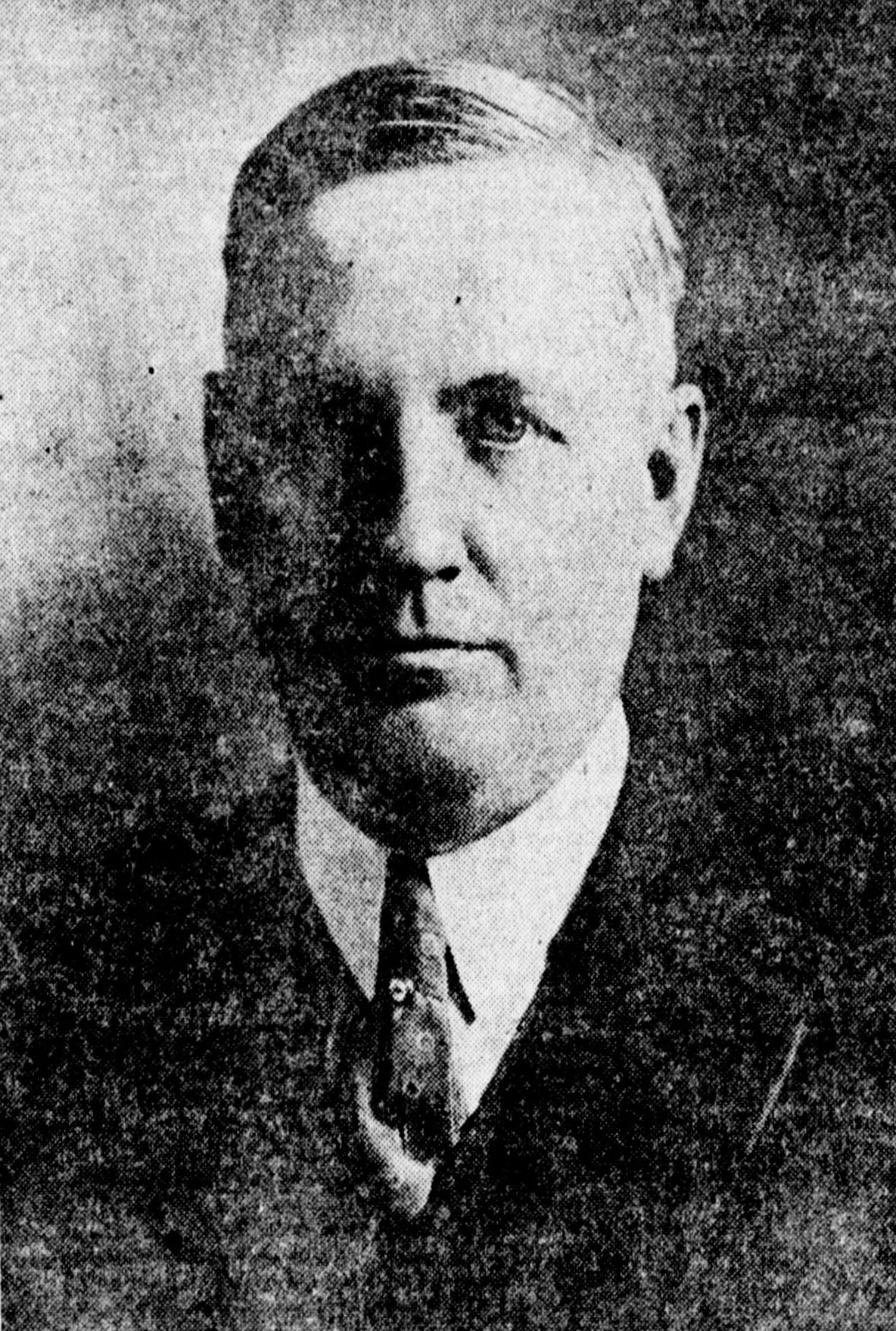
- Born: Jacob Louis Hamon; June 5, 1873; Grenola, Kansas, U.S.
- Died: November 26, 1920 (aged 47); Ardmore, Oklahoma, U.S.
- Cause of death: Gunshot wound
- Resting place: Rose Hill Cemetery; 34.1453018°N 97.1355972°W
- Education: University of Kansas
- Occupations: Oilman; businessman; politician
- Political party: Republican
- Spouse: Georgia Perkins (m. 1898)
- Children: Jake and Olivebelle

Jacob Louis Hamon Sr. (June 5, 1873 – November 26, 1920) was an American attorney, oil millionaire, railway owner, and political figure. He was Chairman of the Oklahoma Republican National Committee, and after statehood, state chairman of the Republican National Committee. By 1920, he had become quite wealthy and an influential player in Republican Party politics. He allegedly swung enough Republican votes to assure Warren G. Harding would be the Republican candidate for president, and subsequently become the President-elect.

It was rumored that Harding would name Hamon to an important post in the new administration. His murder, and the subsequent trial of his mistress, was national news in 1920.

His mistress, private secretary and business agent, Clara Smith, was found innocent of murder charges.

== Personal life ==
Hamon was born in Grenola, Kansas, and graduated from the University of Kansas with a law degree in 1898. In the same year, he married Georgia Perkins in Sedan, Kansas. They had two children, Jake L. Hamon Jr. (born 1901 or 1902) and Olivebelle Hamon (born 1909).

== Career ==
Hamon moved to Lawton, in the Oklahoma Territory, in 1901. He became city attorney. He was elected mayor. He was voted out of office in 1903, amid accusations of corruption and claims of extorting money from local gamblers.

He became chairman of the Oklahoma Territory Republican National Committee. In 1909, he was a lobbyist in Washington, D.C.

In 1910, he was accused of trying to bribe U.S. Senator Thomas Gore to support some land contracts that attorney J. M. McMurray had made with the Chickasaw and Choctaw Nations. Gore claimed that the contracts were worth $30 million, and that Hamon stood to gain a 10 percent fee contingent on the sales. Hamon had offered Gore $25,000 for his favorable vote. Gore continued to oppose the sale. The charge was investigated by a congressional committee, where both McMurray and Hamon denied under oath that they had attempted to bribe the Senator Gore.

He moved in 1912 to Ardmore, Oklahoma, and, with circus owner John Ringling, built a railway from Ardmore to Ringling, Oklahoma. Hamon had already begun speculating in oil leases in the Healdton oil field, where he reportedly became very wealthy.

In 1920, he was elected a Republican National Committeeman for Oklahoma, defeating John Embry of Chandler and James J. McGraw of Oklahoma City. He helped broker the selection of Warren G. Harding for candidate for US president. As a result, he was believed to be inline for selection for a cabinet post.

== Clara Smith Hamon ==
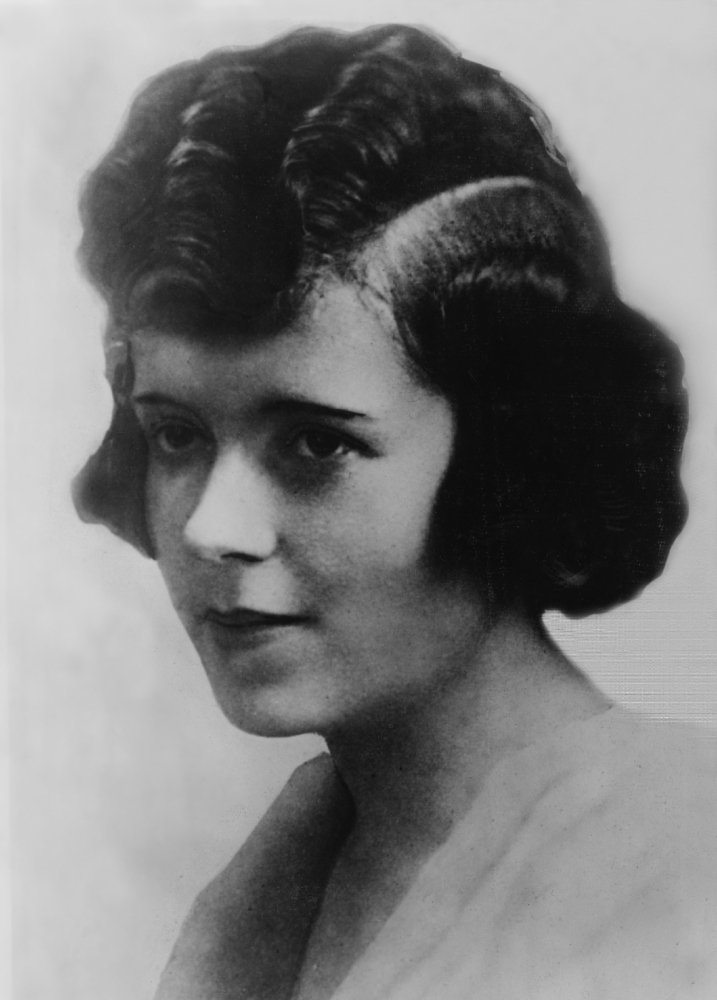
Clara Smith, Jake Hamon's lover and killer

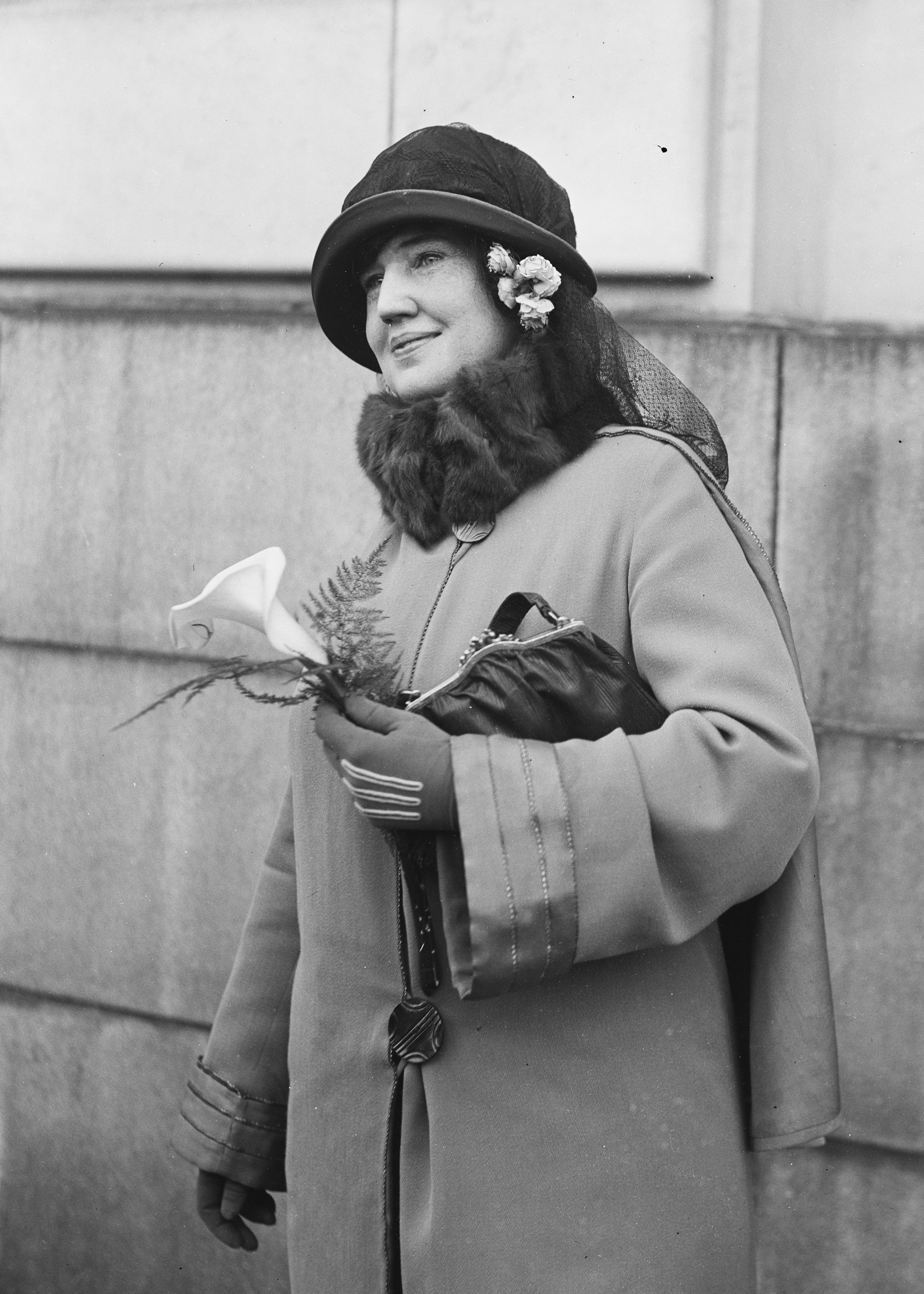
Mrs. Jake L. Hamon, Georgia Perkins

Robinson's article says that Jake Hamon met Clara Belle Smith at a store in Lawton when he was 40 and she was 16, (Note: Thus, the event occurred about 1913.) and that they began a love affair shortly after. She was an ambitious social climber eager to get out of small-town Oklahoma. Soon, Jake sent her to a business school, where she displayed a sharp mind for the subject. He also sent her to a finishing school, so she could behave appropriately and comfortably while dealing with important people. Showing still more nerve and ruthlessness, Jake summoned his nephew, Frank Hamon, and offered him $10,000 to marry Clara, then disappear to California, leaving Clara in Oklahoma. Apparently, Walter accepted the whole deal. When Georgia Hamon, Jake's wife, figured out the relationship between Jake and Clara, and that she had essentially been abandoned by Jake, she confronted all three. In the end, she said that she would not give her husband a divorce, but would take their two children and go live in Chicago. True to her word, Georgia moved to Chicago. Jake and Clara continued to live life as usual. They returned to Ardmore, Oklahoma where they lived in luxurious adjoining rooms at the Randol Hotel. In 1919, Jake would campaign for election as Republican National Committeeman.

== 1920 Presidential election ==
This election turned increasingly bitter. His opponents in the party began a campaign to undermine his public credibility and reputation, even claiming that he was not a resident of the state. One attack in the press openly called him a womanizer. When it seemed that he might actually lose the election, Hamon called Georgia and begged her to return to the state and campaign with him. Amazingly, she agreed, and he was able to present himself as a good family man. The party faithful jumped into line behind him, enabling him to win the election and making him even more powerful in party politics.

A few months before the 1920 Presidential election, Hamon met Warren G. Harding for the first time. At the meeting, Hamon first learned that Florence Harding was a second cousin of his estranged wife, Georgia. The news ended any thought Jake might have had about divorcing Georgia. Clara quickly realized the same thing and put more pressure on Jake to initiate a divorce.

By June 1920, Jake had impressed Harding's campaign manager, Harry M. Daugherty, that he could swing enough campaign money and votes to Harding to give the Ohioan the party nomination, in exchange for the right offer. (Note: Harding was then a dark horse behind General Leonard Wood, Illinois Governor Frank Lowden and (former) California Governor Hiram Johnson (then a sitting Senator).) After Harding won the general election in November, a rumor spread that the new president had offered Hamon the post of Secretary of the Interior. Many political observers seemed surprised that Hamon declined the job.

Decades later, Bob Hutchins, a close associate of Hamon revealed the probable reason: "Harding directed Hamon to bring his 'legitimate family' to Washington, D.C., and to leave his secretary in Ardmore."

== Death ==
A confidant of the new president came to Ardmore on November 21, 1920. Hamon had ordered a private dinner set up in the Randol Hotel for himself and his visitor, where they were expecting to talk about Hamon's role in the new administration. According to Bob Hutchins, Clara was not included, but she came down early from upstairs, totally drunk by at least report. She and Hamon had an argument before Jake told her to go back to her room and threatened to have police arrest her for disorderly conduct. (Note: The hotel manager later said that Jake was already drunk, "... as usual.") Hutchins escorted Clara to her room, where she apparently laid down and fell asleep. When Hamon told Hutchins that he wanted to go up and console her, Hutchins warned him not to go because she had been so distraught all afternoon. Hutchins claimed he said, "She thinks you are giving her the brushoff. If you go up there now, you will come down on a death wagon."

Later that evening, Hamon came down alone, reeling, and collapsed when he reached the dining room. Hutchins rushed to his side and discovered Jake had been shot. A local surgeon was awaiting dinner in the restaurant, and quickly helped Hutchins get the victim to the nearby Ardmore Sanitarium and Hospital. Hutchins waited while doctors worked on Hamon. Jake claimed he had been cleaning his pistol, and the gun accidentally went off. Meanwhile, the doctors found that the bullet had lodged against the victim's spine, and they considered the situation inoperable. While fading in and out of consciousness, Hamon told Hutchins to take Clara to his own home in El Paso immediately and send her to Mexico. Then see that she came back in time for her trial in court. Hutchins faithfully complied.

Hamon continued to linger between life and death for five days. Georgia made it back in time to hold his hand as he took his last breath on November 26, 1920.

== Aftermath ==
He was killed by Clara Smith Hamon, his mistress and the wife of his nephew. She pleaded self-defense. After a trial which lasted seven days, the jury reported back in 39 minutes with a finding of not guilty.

After her trial, Clara nearly disappeared into obscurity. She later tried to work as an actress. In 2017 the Missouri newspaper Bolivar Herald Free Press ran a series about her that opened with a 1921 headline, "Clara Smith Hamon Film Will Be Barred in City." The article went on to explain who Clara Smith Hamon and Jake L. Hamon were. The silent movie's title was not even named in the article.

== External references ==
- GK Chesterton (1922). "News". What I saw in America. Dodd, Mead and Company.
- "State to help try Clara Smith Hamon". NY Times. 1920.
- "Will charge woman with Hamon murder, prosecutor says". NY Times. 1920.
- "Girl denies intent to kill Jake Hamon. Clara Smith Hamon testifies". NY Times. 1921.
- "Clara Hamon freed by murder. Jury acquitted on first ballot". NY Times. 1921.
- "Jake Hamon Trial Documents". Scribd.com. State of Oklahoma. December 8, 1920.
