= Pedro Ruiz de Velasco =

Mexican businessman

Pedro Thomas Ruiz de Velasco de la Madrid
- Born: Pedro Thomas Ruiz de Velasco de la Madrid; April 1, 1915; Mexico District Federal, Mexico
- Died: August 18, 1996 (aged 81); Mexico City, Mexico
- Spouse: Susana Zenteno Ruiz de Velasco (m. 1915–1996)
- Children: 18 children including Veronica Ruiz de Velasco
- Parent(s): Felipe Ruiz de Velasco y Leyva & Beatriz de LaMadrid y Crespo

Pedro Thomas Ruiz de Velasco de la Madrid (April 1, 1915 – August 18, 1996) was a Mexican businessman and the family holder of several historical documents from Mexico including the original Acta de Independencia del Imperio Mexicano de 1821.

== Biography ==
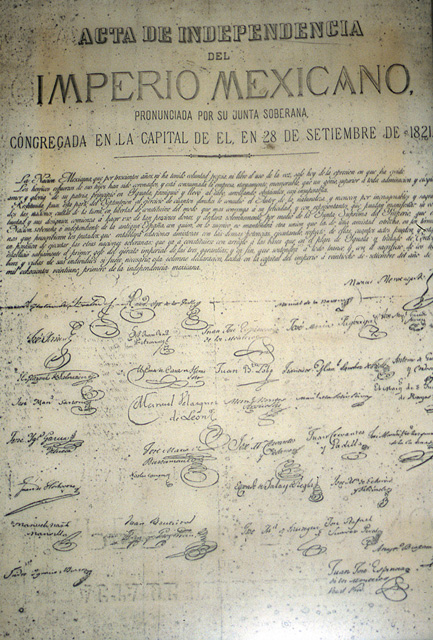
Act of Independence of Empire of Mexico, 1821.

Pedro Ruiz de Velasco was born in the Mexican Federal District and married Susana Esperanza Zenteno on August 2, 1945. His children included Veronica Ruiz de Velasco, an important Mexican neo-figurative artist. His sisters were Teófila Ruiz de Velasco de la Madrid, María de Lourdes Ruiz de Velasco de la Madrid, Caridad Ruiz de Velasco de la Madrid, Beatriz Ruiz de Velasco de la Madrid, & Guadalupe Lucía Beatriz Ruiz de Velasco y la Madrid. His brothers were Felipe Salvador Ruiz de Velasco de la Madrid and Pedro Tomás Ruiz de Velasco de la Madrid.

The Ruiz de Velasco family were the original owners for 128 years of the Acta de Independencia del Imperio Mexicano de 1821. This document was passed down through generations from Nicolás Bravo. On August 22, 1987, Pedro Ruiz de Velasco gave the document as a gift to Mexico.

Jose Francisco Ruiz Massieu accepted this gift and secured this historical document in the Museo Historico de Acapulco Fuerte de San Diego in Acapulco in the State of Guerrero.

Pedro Ruiz de Velasco died in México D.F. at the age of 81.
