= Union Center Township, Kansas =

Union Center Township
- Township
- Location in Elk County
- Coordinates: 37°28′00″N 096°26′01″W
- Country: United States
- State: Kansas
- County: Elk

Area
  - Total: 143.99 sq mi (372.92 km^{2})
  - Land: 143.33 sq mi (371.22 km^{2})
  - Water: 0.66 sq mi (1.7 km^{2}) 0.46%
- Elevation: 1,414 ft (431 m)

Population (2020)
  - Total: 115
  - Density: 0.802/sq mi (0.310/km^{2})
- GNIS feature ID: 1729700

Union Center Township is a township in Elk County, Kansas, United States. As of the 2020 census, its population was 115.

== Geography ==
Union Center Township covers an area of 143.99 square miles (372.9 km^{2}) and contains no incorporated settlements. According to the USGS, it contains three cemeteries: Bunker Hill, Clear Cut and Forest.

The streams of Bull Creek, Clear Creek, Rowe Branch Elk River and South Branch Elk River run through this township.
