= Fiat, Kansas =

Ghost town in Elk County, Kansas, United States

Coordinates: 37°32′27″N 96°12′27″W

Fiat is a ghost town in Paw Paw Township, Elk County, Kansas, United States.

== History ==
A post office was opened in Fiat in 1882, and remained in operation until it was discontinued in 1898.

== See also ==
- List of ghost towns in Kansas
