= Cave Springs, Kansas =

Ghost town in Elk County, Kansas, United States

Coordinates: 37°32′00″N 96°07′21″W

Cave Springs is a ghost town in Elk County, Kansas, United States.

== History ==
Cave Springs was founded in 1873.

The post office in Cave Springs closed in 1903.

== See also ==
- List of ghost towns in Kansas
