= Hammon =

Hammon may refer to:

== People ==
- Becky Hammon (born 1977), American-Russian basketball coach
- Jupiter Hammon (1711 – c. 1806), American poet
- Marcia Hammon, American politician
- Stratton Hammon (1904–1997), American architect
- Thomas Hammon (1550–1607), English politician

== Places ==
- Hammon, Oklahoma
- Umm al-Amad, Lebanon (ancient Hammon)

== Mythology ==
- Baʿal Hammon, the chief god of Carthage
- Hammon, an alternative spelling of the Egyptian god Amun
  - Zeus Hammon and Jupiter Hammon, alternative spellings of Zeus Amun and Jupiter Amun

== See also ==
- Hamon (disambiguation)
- Hammond (disambiguation)
