= Elk Falls Township, Kansas =

Elk Falls Township
- Township
- Location in Elk County
- Coordinates: 37°20′45″N 096°12′27″W
- Country: United States
- State: Kansas
- County: Elk

Area
  - Total: 58.71 sq mi (152.07 km^{2})
  - Land: 58.61 sq mi (151.79 km^{2})
  - Water: 0.11 sq mi (0.28 km^{2}) 0.18%
- Elevation: 974 ft (297 m)

Population (2020)
  - Total: 197
  - Density: 3.36/sq mi (1.30/km^{2})
- GNIS feature ID: 0469873

Elk Falls Township is a township in Elk County, Kansas, United States. As of the 2020 census, its population was 197.

== Geography ==
Elk Falls Township covers an area of 58.72 square miles (152.1 km^{2}) and contains one incorporated settlement, Elk Falls. According to the USGS, it contains one cemetery, Mount Olivet.

The streams of South Fork Wildcat Creek and Wildcat Creek run through this township.

== Transportation ==
Elk Falls Township contains one airport or landing strip, Elk County Airport.
