= Upola, Kansas =

Ghost town in Elk County, Kansas, United States

Coordinates: 37°25′00″N 95°59′55″W

Upola is a ghost town in Elk County, Kansas, United States.

== History ==
A post office was opened in Upola in 1887, and remained in operation until it was discontinued in 1909.

== See also ==
- List of ghost towns in Kansas
