= Hamon, Pool =

Hamon
- Location in the Republic of the Congo
- Coordinates: 4°11′36″S 14°47′51″E
- Country: Republic of the Congo
- Department: Pool
- District: Kinkala

Hamon, sometimes called Madzia, a nearby river, is a small village situated in the Pool Department in the Republic of the Congo. The name of the village were given by an old man who fought for that territory during the colonialism period. It has a small forest called Sangui.

== Transport ==
It is served by a railway station named Madzia on the Congo-Ocean Railway.

== See also ==
- Railway stations in Congo
