= Moline, Kansas =

City in Elk County, Kansas

- City
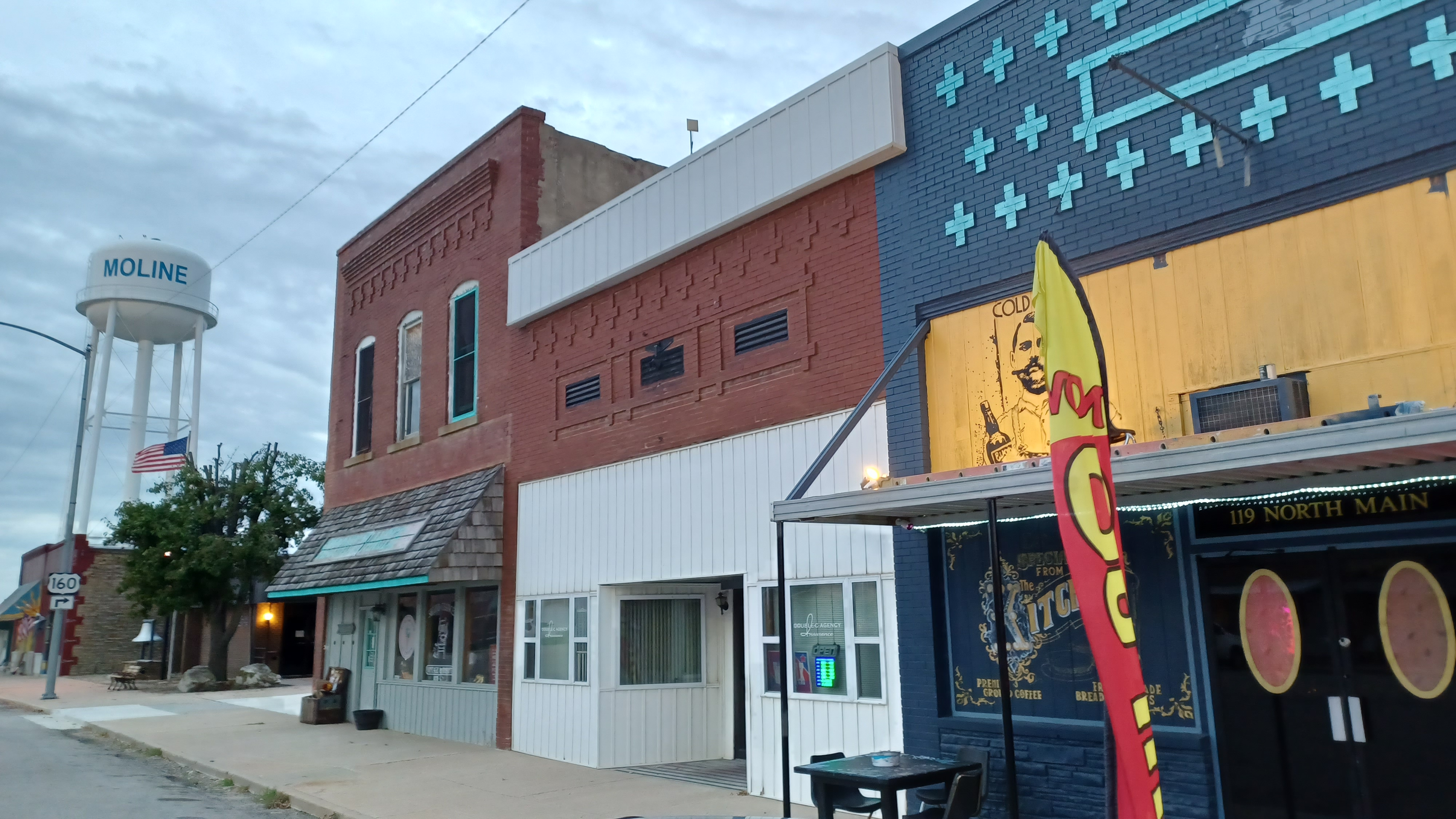
- Moline (2022)

- Location within Elk County and Kansas

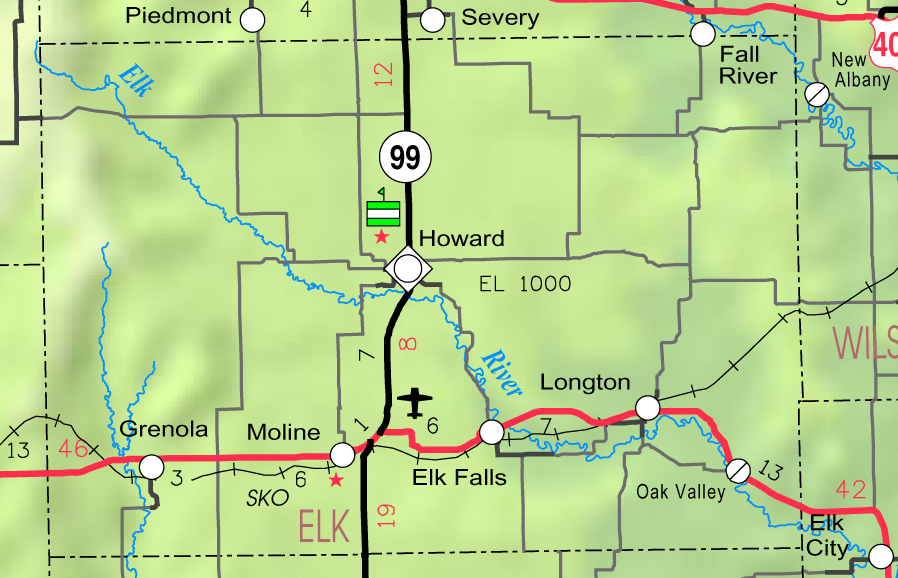
- KDOT map of Elk County (legend)
- Coordinates: 37°21′49″N 96°18′09″W
- Country: United States
- State: Kansas
- County: Elk
- Founded: 1879
- Incorporated: 1886
- Named for: Moline, Illinois

Government
  - Type: Mayor–Council

Area
  - Total: 0.34 sq mi (0.87 km^{2})
  - Land: 0.34 sq mi (0.87 km^{2})
  - Water: 0 sq mi (0.00 km^{2})
- Elevation: 1,053 ft (321 m)

Population (2020)
  - Total: 345
  - Density: 1,000/sq mi (400/km^{2})
- Time zone: UTC-6 (CST)
  - Summer (DST): UTC-5 (CDT)
- ZIP Code: 67353
- Area code: 620
- FIPS code: 20-47600
- GNIS ID: 2395366

Moline is a city in Elk County, Kansas, United States. As of the 2020 census, the population of the city was 345. Moline is located in south central Elk County at the intersection of U.S. Highway 160 and K-99.

Moline is known for being the home of Kansas' oldest swinging (suspension-type) bridge, built in 1904. The bridge spans over a lower portion of a local stream, Wildcat Creek. Immediately to the west of the famous Swinging Bridge, there is a limestone water fall on an intermittent stream.

== History ==
Moline is located on a slightly elevated plateau in the valley of Wildcat Creek, named so by the indigenous Native Americans because of the prominent number of wildcats (bobcats) that lived along the stream. In early 1879 as the Santa Fe Railway extended westward from Independence, Missouri, towns sprang up vigorously along the line. The Land and Town Company chartered the land for the city on July 21, 1879 and laid out the town. The name Moline was decided upon at the suggestion of Mr. J.F. Chapman, of the original town company, who came from the area of Moline, Illinois, and because the farmers in the area largely used the Moline plow.

The first post office in Moline was established in September 1879.

== Geography ==
According to the United States Census Bureau, the city has a total area of 0.35 square miles (0.91 km^{2}), all land.

== Demographics ==
Historical population
Census	Pop.	Note	%±
1880	79		—
1890	527		567.1%
1900	695		31.9%
1910	808		16.3%
1920	950		17.6%
1930	897		−5.6%
1940	870		−3.0%
1950	871		0.1%
1960	698		−19.9%
1970	555		−20.5%
1980	553		−0.4%
1990	473		−14.5%
2000	457		−3.4%
2010	371		−18.8%
2020	345		−7.0%
U.S. Decennial Census

=== 2020 census ===
The 2020 United States census counted 345 people, 146 households, and 89 families in Moline. The population density was 1,029.9 per square mile (397.6/km^{2}). There were 188 housing units at an average density of 561.2 per square mile (216.7/km^{2}). The racial makeup was 90.43% (312) white or European American (85.51% non-Hispanic white), 0.58% (2) black or African-American, 2.03% (7) Native American or Alaska Native, 0.0% (0) Asian, 0.0% (0) Pacific Islander or Native Hawaiian, 1.74% (6) from other races, and 5.22% (18) from two or more races. Hispanic or Latino of any race was 7.83% (27) of the population.

Of the 146 households, 24.7% had children under the age of 18; 44.5% were married couples living together; 29.5% had a female householder with no spouse or partner present. 31.5% of households consisted of individuals and 17.1% had someone living alone who was 65 years of age or older. The average household size was 2.1 and the average family size was 2.6. The percent of those with a bachelor's degree or higher was estimated to be 6.7% of the population.

24.9% of the population was under the age of 18, 3.5% from 18 to 24, 17.1% from 25 to 44, 29.0% from 45 to 64, and 25.5% who were 65 years of age or older. The median age was 49.9 years. For every 100 females, there were 104.1 males. For every 100 females ages 18 and older, there were 105.6 males.

The 2016–2020 5-year American Community Survey estimates show that the median household income was $35,000 (with a margin of error of +/- $10,521) and the median family income was $35,893 (+/- $17,958). Males had a median income of $20,625 (+/- $9,327) versus $18,750 (+/- $7,831) for females. The median income for those above 16 years old was $20,333 (+/- $4,080). Approximately, 30.3% of families and 32.4% of the population were below the poverty line, including 44.2% of those under the age of 18 and 17.7% of those ages 65 or over.

=== 2010 census ===
As of the census of 2010, there were 371 people, 177 households, and 95 families residing in the city. The population density was 1,060.0 inhabitants per square mile (409.3/km^{2}). There were 229 housing units at an average density of 654.3 per square mile (252.6/km^{2}). The racial makeup of the city was 94.9% White, 0.8% Native American, 0.3% Asian, 1.1% from other races, and 3.0% from two or more races. Hispanic or Latino of any race were 5.1% of the population.

There were 177 households, of which 20.3% had children under the age of 18 living with them, 41.2% were married couples living together, 7.3% had a female householder with no husband present, 5.1% had a male householder with no wife present, and 46.3% were non-families. 40.1% of all households were made up of individuals, and 22.6% had someone living alone who was 65 years of age or older. The average household size was 2.10 and the average family size was 2.76.

The median age in the city was 48.8 years. 18.3% of residents were under the age of 18; 6.4% were between the ages of 18 and 24; 21% were from 25 to 44; 28.6% were from 45 to 64; and 25.6% were 65 years of age or older. The gender makeup of the city was 49.3% male and 50.7% female.

=== 2000 census ===
As of the census of 2000, there were 457 people, 211 households, and 116 families residing in the city. The population density was 1,318.6 inhabitants per square mile (509.1/km^{2}). There were 255 housing units at an average density of 735.8 per square mile (284.1/km^{2}). The racial makeup of the city was 93.65% White, 0.44% African American, 0.66% Native American, 3.06% from other races, and 2.19% from two or more races. Hispanic or Latino of any race were 3.94% of the population.

There were 211 households, out of which 17.1% had children under the age of 18 living with them, 47.4% were married couples living together, 6.6% had a female householder with no husband present, and 45.0% were non-families. 42.7% of all households were made up of individuals, and 28.0% had someone living alone who was 65 years of age or older. The average household size was 2.00 and the average family size was 2.75.

In the city, the population was spread out, with 17.7% under the age of 18, 5.0% from 18 to 24, 17.7% from 25 to 44, 21.9% from 45 to 64, and 37.6% who were 65 years of age or older. The median age was 55 years. For every 100 females, there were 84.3 males. For every 100 females age 18 and over, there were 79.0 males.

The median income for a household in the city was $22,143, and the median income for a family was $31,667. Males had a median income of $27,750 versus $14,792 for females. The per capita income for the city was $14,076. About 16.7% of families and 28.4% of the population were below the poverty line, including 55.6% of those under age 18 and 12.1% of those age 65 or over.

== Education ==
The community is served by West Elk USD 282 public school district. School unification consolidated Moline, Howard and Severy schools forming USD 282. West Elk High School is located in Howard. The West Elk High School mascot is Patriots.

Moline High School closed through school unification. The Moline High School mascot was Hornets.

== Museums ==
=== Shaffer House Museum and Art Center ===
Moline is home to the historic Shaffer House Museum and Art Center. It is located at the corner of 2nd and Plum Streets, and is a three-story building which was originally a rooming house, it was later converted to a doctor's office and hospital run by Dr. C.E. Shaffer. The Shaffer Museum is operated by a group of local volunteer citizens and is open May through August from 9 A.M. to 12 P.M. on Wednesdays and Saturdays. Admission to the facility is free of charge. The Shaffer Museum features historical exhibits of an early 1900s kitchen and bedroom, a 1917 photographer's studio, 20th century medical equipment, many local antique farming tools, and mementos from the Ames Chevrolet dealership, which was located in Moline, KS and before closing due to fire was considered the oldest continuously operating family owned Chevrolet dealership in the United States. The museum also contains historically significant items from local schools including Moline High School which is no longer in operation. In addition, the museum features artifacts including articles and photographs of one of the United States' great World War II aviation heroes, General Leon Johnson, who spent most of his childhood in Moline.

== Community Festivals and Events ==
=== Moline Crazy Days ===
Crazy Days, as it is referred to locally, is a Moline festival event open completely to the public and is always held the during the last full weekend of June at the Griffin City Park. The event starts off Friday evening with a "bean feed" consisting of ham and beans, cornbread, and all the fixings. After the bean feed, a baked-goods benefit auction is held at the same location with the proceeds used to make improvements and repairs to the local Moline infrastructure. Saturday morning kicks off with a community parade which usually consists of local law enforcement, ambulances, fire fighters, cowboys and cowgirls on their horses, farmers on their tractors, children in wagons and on bicycles, teens on ATVs, and a variety of unique floats created by local organizations and businesses, all of whom throw candy to youngsters lined up on each side of the main street. After the parade, there are many events at the Griffin Park. Local talents provide music for the crowd, and hamburgers are served by the local chapter of the Elk County Cattlewoman's Association. The festival commences with music and games until sundown. Once it is dark, a fireworks display is put on in the field adjacent to Griffin Park and the event is concluded.

=== Elk County Rodeo ===
Among the most popular events held in Moline each year is the annual Elk County Rodeo, held on July 3 and 4 at the Elk County Rodeo Grounds, located at the Junction of US-160 and K-99. The rodeo begins each night with a patriotic local tradition displaying a flag that is carried around the arena by a local cowboy as Johnny Cash's "Ragged Old Flag" is played in remembrance of the fight for America's independence and freedom. The first event is mutton busting for the youth, and then is followed by the usual array of rodeo events including calf roping, bareback and saddle bronc riding, barrel racing, and the most popular, bull riding. The second night is a repeat of the first, except following the rodeo there is a fireworks display, which is followed by a concert and dance.

== Recreation ==
=== Moline New City Lake (North) ===
Moline New City Lake is located in the scenic Osage Questas region in southeast Kansas just one mile north of Moline. Native tall grass prairie comprises most of the lake's 4,742 acre drainage basin and helps maintain the average 36 inches of water transparency. The lake is located one and one-half miles north of the city of Moline. Construction of the lake was completed on February 18, 1983 for the purposes of flood control, civic water supply, and recreation. The city of Moline still uses the lake as its primary water supply. The 185 acre lake is surrounded by 257 acres of city owned and managed property. Improvements at the lake include a paved boat ramp, boat loading dock, five shelter houses, handicapped accessible outhouse, five earthen and rip-rapped fishing piers.

=== Moline Old City Lake (South) ===
Moline Old City Lake is located in the scenic Osage Questas region in southeast Kansas approximately one mile west of moline on U.S. Highway 160, one mile south on Road 12, and one-half mile west on Cyclone Road. Native tall grass prairie comprises most of the lake's 5,760 acre drainage basin and this combined with the aquatic vegetation helps to maintain 42 inches of water transparency. The lake is located two miles west and one-half mile south of the city of Moline. The Works Progress Administration completed construction of the lake in 1937 for the purposes of flood control, civic water supply, and recreation. The city of Moline no longer uses the lake for potable water supply. The 65 acre lake is surrounded by 85 acres of city owned and managed property. Improvements at the lake include a concrete boat ramp, shelter house, ADA approved outhouse, and picnic tables.

== Notable people ==
- Leon Johnson, United States Air Force four-star general and World War II Medal of Honor recipient.
