= Olivebelle Hamon =

American child musical prodigy and heiress

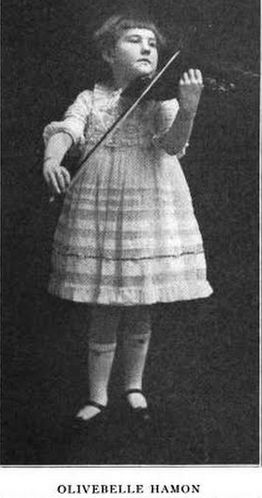
- Hamon as a child violinist, from a 1920 publication
- Born: September 2, 1909; Lawton, Oklahoma
- Died: August 20, 1987 (aged 77); Portland, Oregon
- Other name: Loma Worth
- Occupations: Violinist, vaudeville performer, pilot
- Parent(s): Jacob Louis "Jake" Hamon, Georgia W. Perkins Hamon
- Relatives: Jake L. Hamon, Jr. (brother)

Olivebelle Hamon, also known professionally as Loma Worth (September 2, 1909 – August 20, 1987), was a child musical prodigy, heiress, vaudeville performer, and licensed pilot, with a headline-making personal life in adulthood.

== Early life ==
Olivebelle (or Olive Belle) Hamon was born in Lawton, Oklahoma, the daughter of Jacob Louis "Jake" Hamon and Georgia W. Perkins Hamon. Her mother was a cousin to Warren G. Harding. Her father, an oil millionaire charged with bribing Senator Thomas P. Gore, was killed in 1920 by his nephew's wife Clara Smith Hamon, who was acquitted in the ensuing high-profile trial. Her only sibling was Jake L. Hamon, Jr., who followed his father into the oil business.

== Career and personal life ==
Olivebelle Hamon was famous from a very early age as a violinist in Chicago, a standout student of Rudolph Reiners. In 1922 she gave a stunt recital, playing her violin while walking up and down 33 floors of external stairs at the Wrigley Building, as a benefit for Camp Algonquin, a YMCA "fresh-air" camp on the Fox River.

She also began flying very young, with lessons well underway by age 10. In 1930, she was denied permission to make a stunt flight from London to Cape Town. In 1930 she participated in the National Women's Air Derby, flying from Long Beach, California to Chicago. She earned her federal flying license in 1932, after the death of pilot Robert Short, a man she planned to marry.

As an adult, she used the names "Freddy Worth" and "Loma Worth" for a show business career as an actress and "one-woman band". Any inheritance from Jake Hamon had been long since lost to extravagance and mismanagement, but not before she acquired a personal airplane to fly between performing engagements.

Much of her fame was derived from her eventful personal life rather than her stage work. Olivebelle Hamon was reported to have a busy roster of suitors, including Pete Llanuza, a newspaper cartoonist in his fifties. She was engaged in 1930, but insisted it was only a lark, because "the stage and aviation have got me." She sought at least three more marriage licenses in 1932, before marrying J. Lawrence Waters of Valdosta, Georgia that year. Her marriage to Waters did not last. In 1938 she married Chicago musician Leo Cooper; they divorced in 1946. She soon married a third time, to Chicago businessman William Augsburger, in 1947; they divorced within a year.

Olivebelle Hamon died in 1987, aged 78 years in Portland, Oregon. Her remains were buried in the same plot as her father, mother, and brother, in Ardmore, Oklahoma.
