= Oak Valley Township, Kansas =

Oak Valley Township
- Township
- Location in Elk County
- Coordinates: 37°20′45″N 096°01′21″W
- Country: United States
- State: Kansas
- County: Elk

Area
  - Total: 44.9 sq mi (116.4 km^{2})
  - Land: 44.83 sq mi (116.11 km^{2})
  - Water: 0.11 sq mi (0.28 km^{2}) 0.24%
- Elevation: 856 ft (261 m)

Population (2020)
  - Total: 92
  - Density: 2.1/sq mi (0.79/km^{2})
- GNIS feature ID: 0469865

Oak Valley Township is a township in Elk County, Kansas, United States. As of the 2020 census, its population was 92.

== Geography ==
Oak Valley Township covers an area of 44.94 square miles (116.4 km^{2}) and contains no incorporated settlements. According to the USGS, it contains one cemetery, Oak Valley.

The streams of Bachelor Creek, Bloody Run, Hickory Creek, Little Hickory Creek, Mid Painterhood Creek and Painterhood Creek run through this township.
