= Grenola, Kansas =

City in Elk County, Kansas

- City
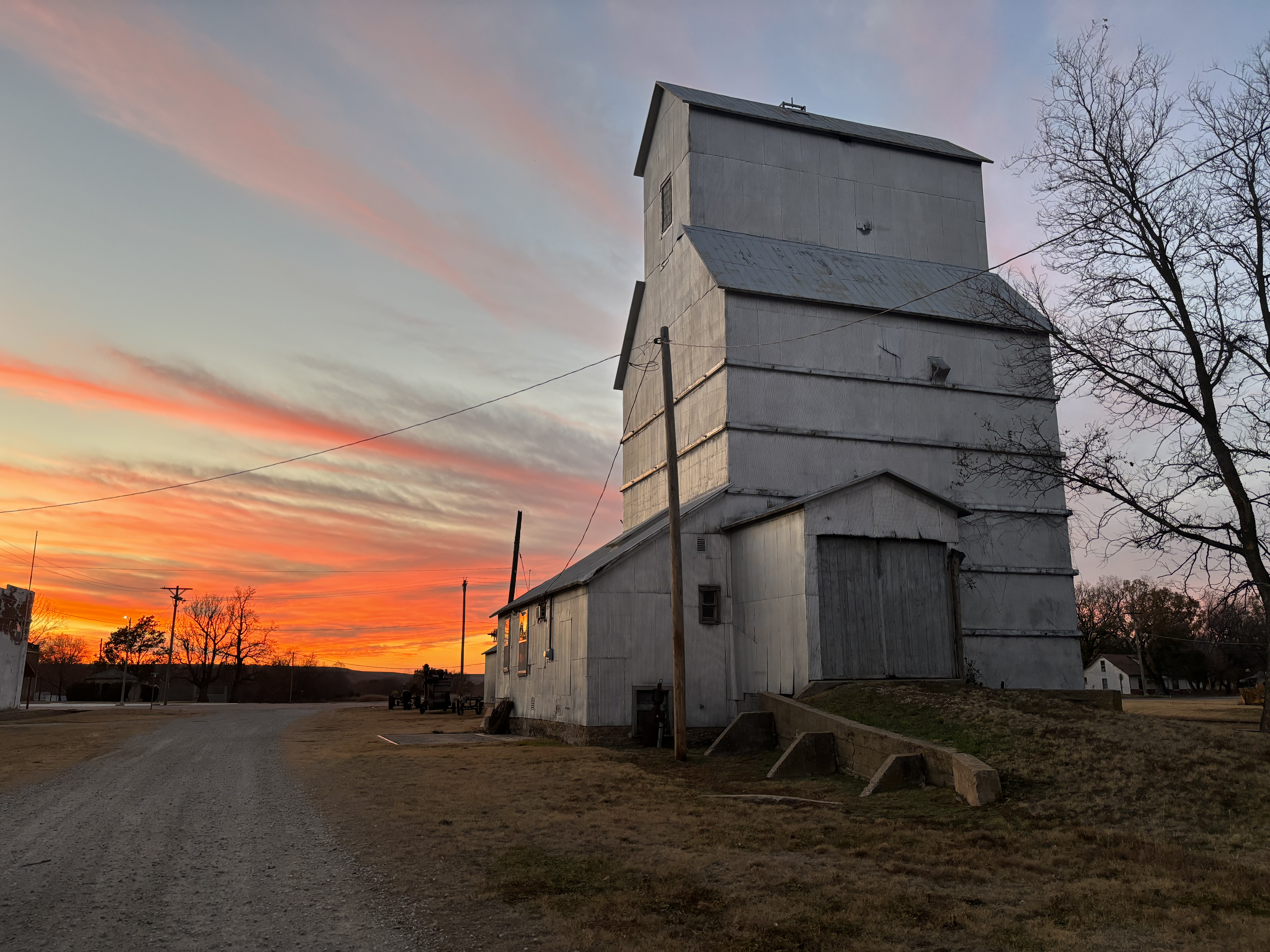
- Grenola Elevator Museum & Historical Society (2023)

- Location within Elk County and Kansas

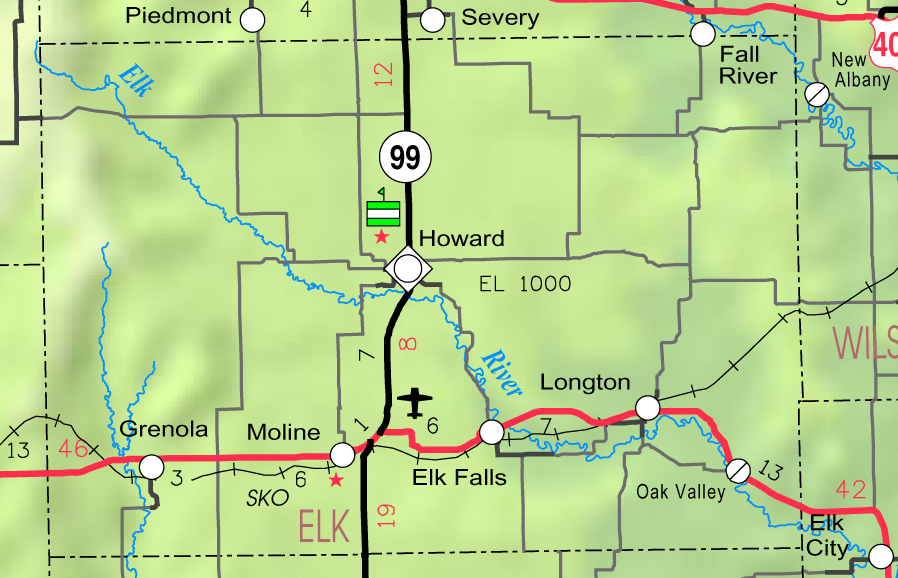
- KDOT map of Elk County (legend)
- Coordinates: 37°21′02″N 96°26′58″W
- Country: United States
- State: Kansas
- County: Elk
- Founded: 1879
- Incorporated: 1880
- Named for: Green Field + Canola

Government
  - Type: Mayor–Council
  - Mayor: Josh Kessinger

Area
  - Total: 0.47 sq mi (1.21 km^{2})
  - Land: 0.46 sq mi (1.20 km^{2})
  - Water: 0.0039 sq mi (0.01 km^{2})
- Elevation: 1,125 ft (343 m)

Population (2020)
  - Total: 151
  - Density: 326/sq mi (126/km^{2})
- Time zone: UTC-6 (CST)
  - Summer (DST): UTC-5 (CDT)
- ZIP Code: 67346
- Area code: 620
- FIPS code: 20-28800
- GNIS ID: 2394247
- Website: www.grenolakansas.com

Grenola is a city in Elk County, Kansas, United States. As of the 2020 census, the population of the city was 151.

== History ==
Grenola had its start in the year 1879 by the building of the railroad through that territory. At that time, the two rival cities of Green Field and Canola, which were three miles apart, relocated to the site of the railroad and merged. The name Grenola is a portmanteau of the names of the two former towns.

== Geography ==
According to the United States Census Bureau, the city has a total area of 0.48 square miles (1.24 km^{2}), all land.

=== Climate ===
The climate in this area is characterized by hot, humid summers and generally mild to cool winters. According to the Köppen Climate Classification system, Grenola has a humid subtropical climate, abbreviated "Cfa" on climate maps.

== Demographics ==
Historical population
Census	Pop.	Note	%±
1890	608		—
1900	666		9.5%
1910	532		−20.1%
1920	547		2.8%
1930	552		0.9%
1940	517		−6.3%
1950	380		−26.5%
1960	349		−8.2%
1970	290		−16.9%
1980	335		15.5%
1990	256		−23.6%
2000	231		−9.8%
2010	216		−6.5%
2020	151		−30.1%
U.S. Decennial Census

=== 2020 census ===
The 2020 United States census counted 151 people, 76 households, and 39 families in Grenola. The population density was 324.7 per square mile (125.4/km^{2}). There were 112 housing units at an average density of 240.9 per square mile (93.0/km^{2}). The racial makeup was 93.38% (141) white or European American (93.38% non-Hispanic white), 0.0% (0) black or African-American, 0.66% (1) Native American or Alaska Native, 0.66% (1) Asian, 0.0% (0) Pacific Islander or Native Hawaiian, 0.66% (1) from other races, and 4.64% (7) from two or more races. Hispanic or Latino of any race was 1.32% (2) of the population.

Of the 76 households, 18.4% had children under the age of 18; 42.1% were married couples living together; 25.0% had a female householder with no spouse or partner present. 44.7% of households consisted of individuals and 21.1% had someone living alone who was 65 years of age or older. The average household size was 2.1 and the average family size was 2.7. The percent of those with a bachelor's degree or higher was estimated to be 17.2% of the population.

21.9% of the population was under the age of 18, 2.6% from 18 to 24, 15.2% from 25 to 44, 31.1% from 45 to 64, and 29.1% who were 65 years of age or older. The median age was 55.3 years. For every 100 females, there were 106.8 males. For every 100 females ages 18 and older, there were 107.0 males.

The 2016–2020 5-year American Community Survey estimates show that the median household income was $44,167 (with a margin of error of +/- $12,418) and the median family income was $60,938 (+/- $8,652). Males had a median income of $22,708 (+/- $17,356). The median income for those above 16 years old was $16,528 (+/- $9,774). Approximately, 10.9% of families and 11.1% of the population were below the poverty line, including 2.7% of those under the age of 18 and 3.0% of those ages 65 or over.

=== 2010 census ===
As of the census of 2010, there were 216 people, 92 households, and 64 families residing in the city. The population density was 450.0 inhabitants per square mile (173.7/km^{2}). There were 128 housing units at an average density of 266.7 per square mile (103.0/km^{2}). The racial makeup of the city was 97.7% White, 1.9% Asian, and 0.5% from two or more races.

There were 92 households, of which 25.0% had children under the age of 18 living with them, 51.1% were married couples living together, 15.2% had a female householder with no husband present, 3.3% had a male householder with no wife present, and 30.4% were non-families. 27.2% of all households were made up of individuals, and 13% had someone living alone who was 65 years of age or older. The average household size was 2.35 and the average family size was 2.80.

The median age in the city was 47.4 years. 25% of residents were under the age of 18; 3.7% were between the ages of 18 and 24; 18.5% were from 25 to 44; 25.8% were from 45 to 64; and 26.9% were 65 years of age or older. The gender makeup of the city was 49.5% male and 50.5% female.

== Education ==
The community is served by Central USD 462 public school district. The Central High School mascot is Central Raiders.

== Notable people ==
- Trixie Friganza (1870–1955), American actress, touring theater (1889–1917), vaudeville (1906–1932), film (1923–1940), born Delia O'Callaghan in Grenola
- Jake L. Hamon Sr. (1873–1920), attorney, oil millionaire, railway owner, political figure, born in Grenola.

== See also ==
- Caney River
- Grenola Mill and Elevator
- South Kansas and Oklahoma Railroad
