= Jamon (disambiguation) =

Jamón is a popular Spanish dry-cured ham.

Jamon may also refer to:

- Jamon Brown (born 1993), American football player
- Jamon Gordon (born 1984), American basketball player
- Jamon Meredith (born 1986), American football player
- Jamón Jamón, a 1992 Spanish comedy/drama film
