= Aly-Enzo Hamon =

Rwandan footballer (born 2003)

Personal information
- Date of birth: 30 March 2003 (age 23)
- Place of birth: Montereau-Fault-Yonne, France
- Height: 1.70 m (5 ft 7 in)
- Position: Left-back

Team information
- Current team: Angoulême
- Number: 13

Youth career
- 2009–2013: DBF Nantes
- 2013–2018: Carquefou
- 2018–2021: Guingamp

Senior career*
Years	Team	Apps	(Gls)
2022–2023	Guingamp II	8	(0)
2023	Basel	0	(0)
2023–2024	Vertou	8	(0)
2024–	Angoulême	32	(0)

International career^{‡}
2019	France U16	5	(0)
2019	France U17	2	(0)
2025–	Rwanda	1	(0)
- * Club domestic league appearances and goals as of 3 December 2025 ‡ National team caps and goals as of 13:53, 6 June 2025 (UTC)

Aly-Enzo Hamon (born 30 March 2003) is a professional footballer who plays as a left-back for Angoulême. Born in France, he plays for the Rwanda national team.

== Club career ==
Hamon is a youth product of DBF Nantes, Carquefou and Guingamp. On 9 July 2020, he signed a professional trainee contract with Guingamp until 2023. In 2022, he was promoted to Guingamp's reserves. On 2 July 2023, he transferred to the Swiss club FC Basel. He shortly after moved to Vertou in the Championnat National 3. On 26 July 2024 he transferred to the Championnat National 3 club Angoulême.

== International career ==
Born in France, Hamon is of Rwandan descent. He is a former youth international for France, having played for the France U16s and U17s. On 4 June 2025, Hamon's request to switch international allegiance to Rwanda was approved by FIFA. He debuted with the Rwanda national team in a friendly 2–0 loss to Algeria the next day.

== Personal life ==
Hamon's father, Yves Mudeyi, was also a professional footballer who played for the Rwanda national team.
