= Felony Investigative Assistance Team =

The Felony Investigative Assistance Team (FIAT) is a multi-jurisdictional police task force comprising 16 law enforcement agencies in Cook County, Illinois, and DuPage County, Illinois. The taskforce covers approximately 300,000 residents in those jurisdictions. It is broken down into five units, four of which are staffed by assigned officers.

== History ==
FIAT began in the 1970s as a group of small police departments in DuPage County, Illinois, identified the need to pool detectives for major investigations. Smaller law enforcement agencies having only a few detectives needed to "borrow" more investigators for crimes such as murder, sexual assault, robbery, or burglary. When FIAT began, all the chiefs of police (and the DuPage Co Sheriff) signed a mutual aid agreement which formalized the process of requesting additional detectives. With a single telephone call, a process to gather these detectives could be underway.

In 1999, the chiefs of those departments saw the need for a tactical unit that could respond to special emergencies such as hostage incidents, barricaded gunmen, active shooters, and high-risk warrant service. The acronym SWAT was used to denote Special Weapons And Tactics. The team's motto is In Hoc Signo Vinces.

Since then, FIAT has expanded to include a pool of traffic crash reconstructionists for fatal or serious injury accidents, as well as a police K9 response group. Now police dogs from member agencies can be called upon to assist in a variety of incidents.

== Member agencies ==
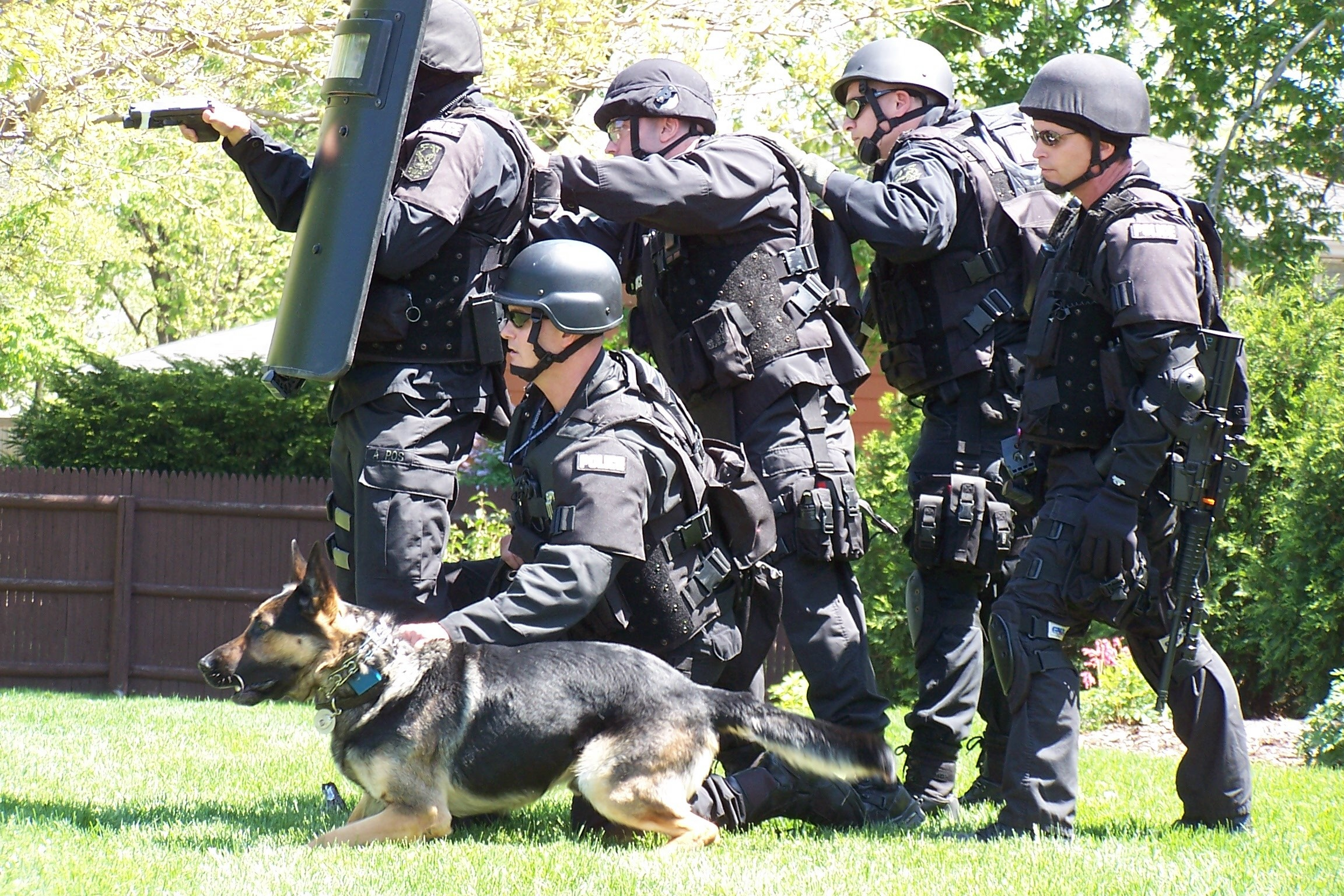

- Brookfield, Illinois
- Burr Ridge, Illinois
- Clarendon Hills, Illinois
- Darien, Illinois
- Downers Grove
- DuPage County
- Hinsdale, Illinois http://villageofhinsdale.org
- Illinois State Police
- Lisle, Illinois
- Lombard, Illinois
- Oak Brook, Illinois http://oak-brook.org
- Warrenville, Illinois
- Westmont, Illinois
- Willowbrook, Illinois
- Winfield, Illinois
- Wood Dale, Illinois
- Woodridge, Illinois http://www.vil.woodridge.il.us/

== Current units ==
FIAT's only unstaffed unit is activated like an in-advance mutual aid plan. No officers are assigned until a planned police event requires such. A FIAT-member agency may request a number of officers for a special event within its jurisdiction (such as a protest, a planned event requiring traffic direction at multiple intersections, or the like.) Member agencies are notified ahead of time to assign any officer to the event.

Officers currently assigned to FIAT are generally specialized within a single component. Officers have collateral duty, maintaining responsibilities at a home agency until an emergency activation. The staffed units are:

- Special Weapons and Tactics (SWAT)
- Canine Response Group
- Major Case Unit (MCU)
- Traffic Crash Reconstruction Unit

== FIAT SWAT ==
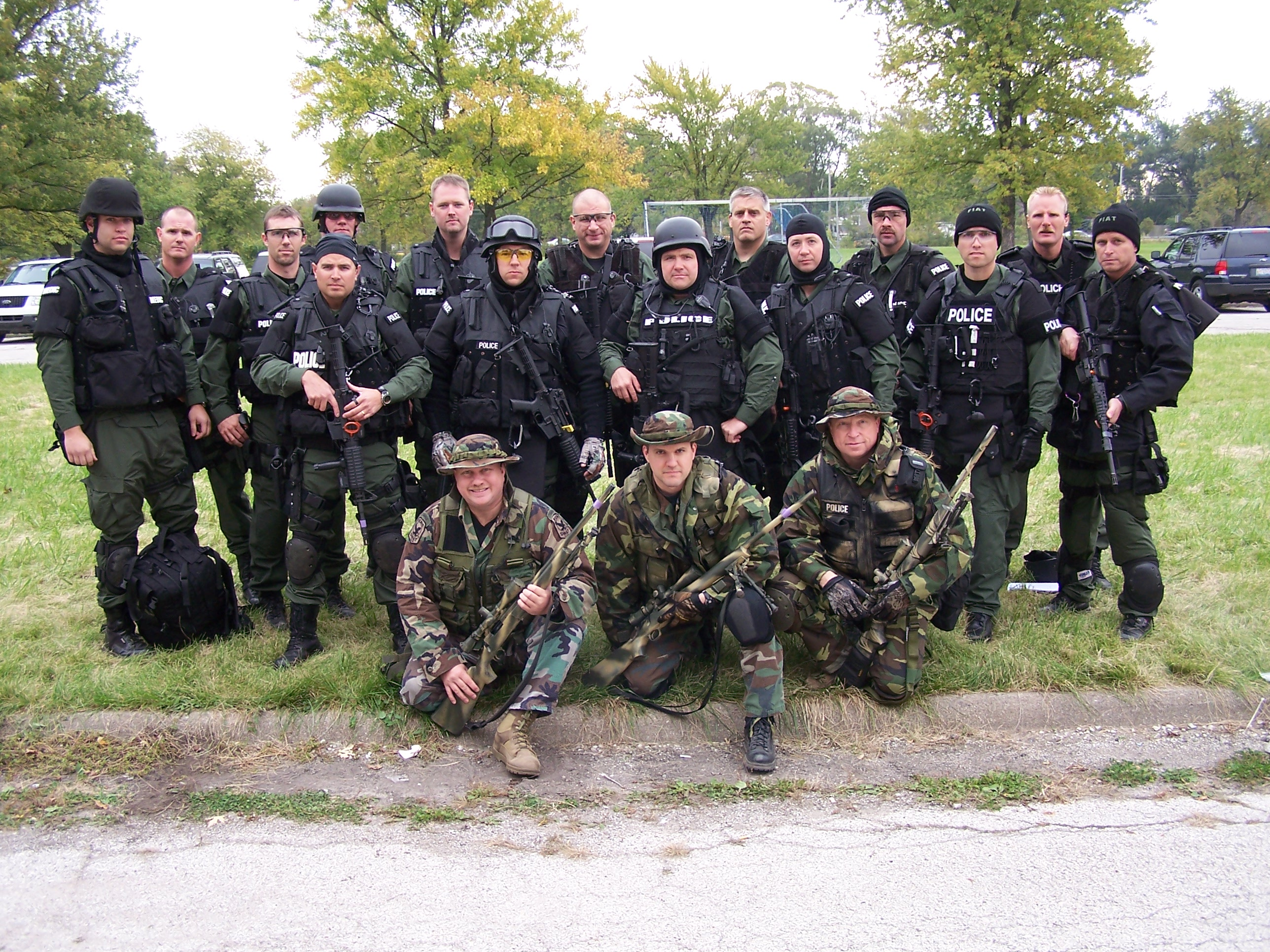

The SWAT unit is generally the most recognized element of FIAT. It is a full-service SWAT team that contains approximately 50 personnel:

- tactical officers,
- crisis negotiators,
- police/fire dispatchers,
- tactical paramedics,
- snipers

Training The SWAT Team trains on a regular basis. The officers assigned to SWAT are called to handle these high-risk incidents, but remain at their local police agencies when not training or handling emergencies.

The SWAT Team also fields a Mobile Training Team (MTT) which provides updated tactical and firearms training to officers of the member agencies.

Organization The Team holds various ranks similar to a police agency or US military unit. The Team maintains:

- Commander (1)
- Assistant Commander (2)
- Tactical Team Leaders (3)
- Sniper Team Leader (1)
- Tactical Dispatch Team Leader (1)
- Tactical Medic Team Leader (1)
- Crisis Negotiations Team Leader (1)
- various Assistant Team Leaders (7)
- DuPage Co State's Attorney Liaison (1)
- Officers, Medics, and Dispatchers (approx 35)

== Selection to FIAT ==
Officers assigned to one of FIAT's staffed units must first be employed by a member law enforcement agency. The selection process is different for each unit. FIAT does not employ anyone. Officers are employed and paid by their home agencies.

== Dissolution and Consolidation ==
On August 1, 2019, The FIAT Board of Directors voted to dissolve FIAT and combined with Du Page Major Crimes to form a new multi-component task force (shared services entity) called Metropolitan Emergency Response and Investigation Team (MERIT.) All funds and equipment owned by FIAT was transferred over to MERIT.
