= Howard, Kansas =

City in Elk County, Kansas

- City and County seat
- Location within Elk County and Kansas

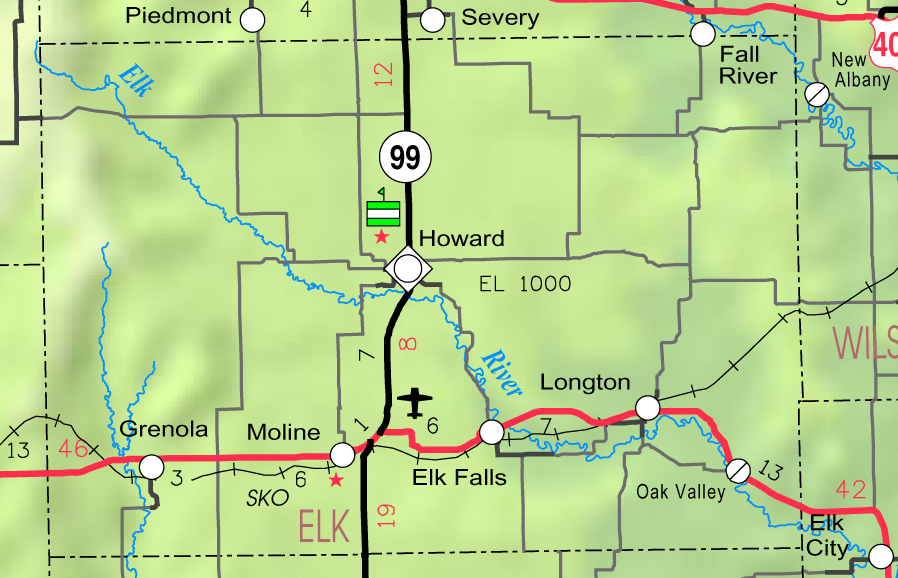
- KDOT map of Elk County (legend)
- Coordinates: 37°28′10″N 96°15′47″W
- Country: United States
- State: Kansas
- County: Elk
- Founded: 1870
- Incorporated: 1877
- Named for: Oliver O. Howard

Government
  - Type: Mayor–Council
  - Mayor: Richard Clark

Area
  - Total: 0.69 sq mi (1.80 km^{2})
  - Land: 0.69 sq mi (1.80 km^{2})
  - Water: 0 sq mi (0.00 km^{2})
- Elevation: 1,040 ft (320 m)

Population (2020)
  - Total: 570
  - Density: 820/sq mi (320/km^{2})
- Time zone: UTC-6 (CST)
  - Summer (DST): UTC-5 (CDT)
- ZIP Code: 67349
- Area code: 620
- FIPS code: 20-33250
- GNIS ID: 2394429
- Website: cityofhoward.org

Howard is a city in and the county seat of Elk County, Kansas, United States. As of the 2020 census, the population of the city was 570.

== History ==
Howard was founded in 1870, and it was incorporated as a city in 1877. Howard was involved in the Great Howard-Sedan War circa 1875. The rivalry was from a disagreement on where the county seat should be. The conflict was very brutal, but ultimately ended in a county line split. A memorial to the victors (Elk County) in the likeness of Bombarillo Crocodillo was placed to honor the lives lost. Howard was named after Oliver O. Howard, a Union Army general during the Civil War and founder of Howard University. The first post office in Howard was established in February, 1870. As of 1901, Howard was a sundown town where African Americans were not allowed to live.

== Geography ==
According to the United States Census Bureau, the city has a total area of 0.70 square miles (1.81 km^{2}), all land.

=== Climate ===
The climate in this area is characterized by hot, humid summers and generally mild to cool winters. According to the Köppen Climate Classification system, Howard has a humid subtropical climate, abbreviated "Cfa" on climate maps.

Climate data for Howard, Kansas, 1991–2020 normals, extremes 1907–present
Month	Jan	Feb	Mar	Apr	May	Jun	Jul	Aug	Sep	Oct	Nov	Dec	Year
Record high °F (°C)	79 (26)	88 (31)	94 (34)	97 (36)	99 (37)	108 (42)	115 (46)	111 (44)	109 (43)	98 (37)	90 (32)	80 (27)	115 (46)
Mean maximum °F (°C)	67.1 (19.5)	71.9 (22.2)	79.7 (26.5)	85.8 (29.9)	89.3 (31.8)	93.7 (34.3)	99.8 (37.7)	100.3 (37.9)	95.9 (35.5)	87.1 (30.6)	76.2 (24.6)	67.4 (19.7)	101.9 (38.8)
Mean daily maximum °F (°C)	43.5 (6.4)	48.5 (9.2)	58.6 (14.8)	68.2 (20.1)	76.2 (24.6)	85.0 (29.4)	90.4 (32.4)	90.0 (32.2)	82.4 (28.0)	70.7 (21.5)	57.3 (14.1)	46.0 (7.8)	68.1 (20.0)
Daily mean °F (°C)	31.7 (−0.2)	35.9 (2.2)	45.4 (7.4)	55.4 (13.0)	64.9 (18.3)	74.1 (23.4)	78.9 (26.1)	77.7 (25.4)	69.4 (20.8)	57.4 (14.1)	44.7 (7.1)	34.6 (1.4)	55.8 (13.3)
Mean daily minimum °F (°C)	19.9 (−6.7)	23.3 (−4.8)	32.3 (0.2)	42.5 (5.8)	53.5 (11.9)	63.1 (17.3)	67.5 (19.7)	65.4 (18.6)	56.5 (13.6)	44.1 (6.7)	32.1 (0.1)	23.3 (−4.8)	43.6 (6.5)
Mean minimum °F (°C)	2.4 (−16.4)	8.0 (−13.3)	14.9 (−9.5)	27.8 (−2.3)	38.9 (3.8)	52.1 (11.2)	58.7 (14.8)	55.6 (13.1)	41.6 (5.3)	27.8 (−2.3)	16.1 (−8.8)	6.7 (−14.1)	−1.1 (−18.4)
Record low °F (°C)	−17 (−27)	−18 (−28)	−2 (−19)	15 (−9)	27 (−3)	42 (6)	47 (8)	43 (6)	27 (−3)	12 (−11)	−3 (−19)	−17 (−27)	−18 (−28)
Average precipitation inches (mm)	1.03 (26)	1.73 (44)	2.75 (70)	3.63 (92)	5.09 (129)	5.69 (145)	4.01 (102)	3.59 (91)	3.54 (90)	3.52 (89)	2.23 (57)	1.77 (45)	38.58 (980)
Average snowfall inches (cm)	2.2 (5.6)	0.8 (2.0)	0.9 (2.3)	0.1 (0.25)	0.0 (0.0)	0.0 (0.0)	0.0 (0.0)	0.0 (0.0)	0.0 (0.0)	0.0 (0.0)	0.9 (2.3)	1.5 (3.8)	6.4 (16.25)
Average precipitation days (≥ 0.01 in)	4.1	4.8	6.8	7.9	9.6	8.6	7.6	6.4	6.7	6.3	5.1	4.9	78.8
Average snowy days (≥ 0.1 in)	1.6	1.2	0.6	0.1	0.0	0.0	0.0	0.0	0.0	0.0	0.3	1.4	5.2
Source 1: NOAA
Source 2: National Weather Service

== Demographics ==
Historical population
Census	Pop.	Note	%±
1880	683		—
1890	1,015		48.6%
1900	1,207		18.9%
1910	1,163		−3.6%
1920	1,060		−8.9%
1930	1,069		0.8%
1940	1,170		9.4%
1950	1,149		−1.8%
1960	1,017		−11.5%
1970	918		−9.7%
1980	965		5.1%
1990	815		−15.5%
2000	808		−0.9%
2010	687		−15.0%
2020	570		−17.0%
U.S. Decennial Census

=== 2020 census ===
The 2020 United States census counted 570 people, 268 households, and 148 families in Howard. The population density was 808.5 per square mile (312.2/km^{2}). There were 347 housing units at an average density of 492.2 per square mile (190.0/km^{2}). The racial makeup was 90.88% (518) white or European American (89.12% non-Hispanic white), 0.35% (2) black or African-American, 1.23% (7) Native American or Alaska Native, 0.18% (1) Asian, 0.0% (0) Pacific Islander or Native Hawaiian, 1.05% (6) from other races, and 6.32% (36) from two or more races. Hispanic or Latino of any race was 4.56% (26) of the population.

Of the 268 households, 20.1% had children under the age of 18; 44.8% were married couples living together; 35.8% had a female householder with no spouse or partner present. 39.9% of households consisted of individuals and 28.0% had someone living alone who was 65 years of age or older. The average household size was 2.1 and the average family size was 2.8. The percent of those with a bachelor's degree or higher was estimated to be 21.2% of the population.

23.7% of the population was under the age of 18, 3.3% from 18 to 24, 17.7% from 25 to 44, 25.6% from 45 to 64, and 29.6% who were 65 years of age or older. The median age was 51.5 years. For every 100 females, there were 112.7 males. For every 100 females ages 18 and older, there were 123.1 males.

The 2016–2020 5-year American Community Survey estimates show that the median household income was $39,750 (with a margin of error of +/- $14,890) and the median family income was $61,167 (+/- $6,692). Males had a median income of $38,750 (+/- $13,936) versus $13,500 (+/- $9,870) for females. The median income for those above 16 years old was $26,944 (+/- $7,633). Approximately, 11.4% of families and 23.7% of the population were below the poverty line, including 26.8% of those under the age of 18 and 14.4% of those ages 65 or over.

=== 2010 census ===
As of the census of 2010, there were 687 people, 318 households, and 176 families residing in the city. The population density was 981.4 inhabitants per square mile (378.9/km^{2}). There were 415 housing units at an average density of 592.9 per square mile (228.9/km^{2}). The racial makeup of the city was 95.1% White, 1.6% Native American, 0.4% Asian, 0.6% from other races, and 2.3% from two or more races. Hispanic or Latino of any race were 4.1% of the population.

There were 318 households, of which 22.3% had children under the age of 18 living with them, 43.1% were married couples living together, 8.8% had a female householder with no husband present, 3.5% had a male householder with no wife present, and 44.7% were non-families. 41.2% of all households were made up of individuals, and 22.7% had someone living alone who was 65 years of age or older. The average household size was 2.03 and the average family size was 2.74.

The median age in the city was 49.6 years. 19.9% of residents were under the age of 18; 6.7% were between the ages of 18 and 24; 17.6% were from 25 to 44; 27.3% were from 45 to 64; and 28.5% were 65 years of age or older. The gender makeup of the city was 47.3% male and 52.7% female.

== Education ==
The community is served by West Elk USD 282 public school district. School unification consolidated Moline, Howard and Severy schools forming USD 282. West Elk High School is located in Howard. The West Elk High School mascot is Patriots.

Prior to school unification, the Howard High School mascot was Pirates.

== See also ==
- List of sundown towns in the United States
- National Register of Historic Places listings in Elk County, Kansas
