= Paw Paw Township, Kansas =

Paw Paw Township
- Township
- Location in Elk County
- Coordinates: 37°33′45″N 096°13′31″W
- Country: United States
- State: Kansas
- County: Elk

Area
  - Total: 54.40 sq mi (140.89 km^{2})
  - Land: 54.27 sq mi (140.55 km^{2})
  - Water: 0.13 sq mi (0.34 km^{2}) 0.24%
- Elevation: 1,142 ft (348 m)

Population (2020)
  - Total: 107
  - Density: 1.97/sq mi (0.761/km^{2})
- GNIS feature ID: 0475058

Paw Paw Township is a township in Elk County, Kansas, United States. As of the 2020 census, its population was 107.

== Geography ==
Paw Paw Township covers an area of 54.4 square miles (141 km^{2}) and contains no incorporated settlements. According to the USGS, it contains two cemeteries: Cresco and Pleasant View.
