= Longton, Kansas =

City in Elk County, Kansas

- City
- Location within Elk County and Kansas

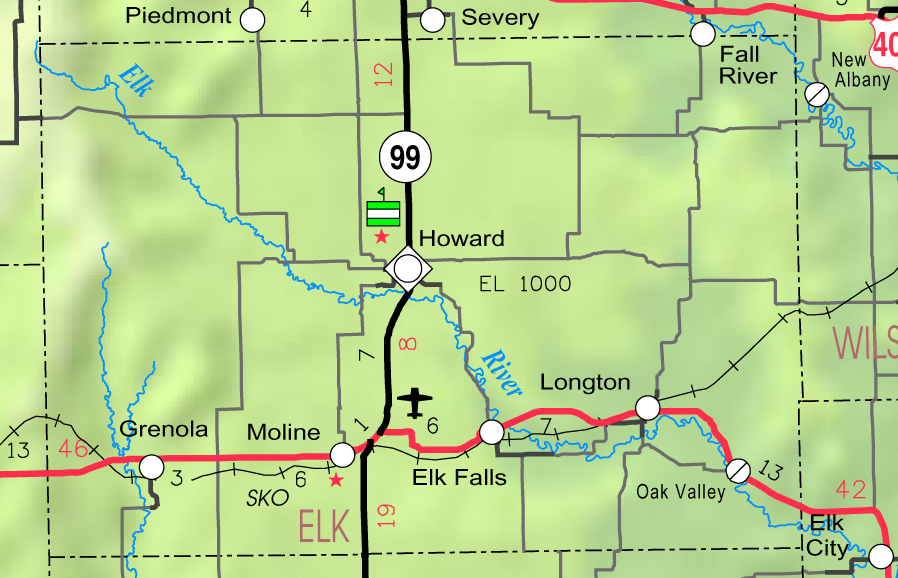
- KDOT map of Elk County (legend)
- Coordinates: 37°22′40″N 96°04′56″W
- Country: United States
- State: Kansas
- County: Elk
- Founded: 1870
- Incorporated: 1870
- Named for: Longton, England

Government
  - Type: Mayor–Council

Area
  - Total: 1.18 sq mi (3.06 km^{2})
  - Land: 1.17 sq mi (3.04 km^{2})
  - Water: 0.0077 sq mi (0.02 km^{2})
- Elevation: 919 ft (280 m)

Population (2020)
  - Total: 288
  - Density: 245/sq mi (94.7/km^{2})
- Time zone: UTC-6 (CST)
  - Summer (DST): UTC-5 (CDT)
- ZIP Code: 67352
- Area code: 620
- FIPS code: 20-42650
- GNIS ID: 2395760
- Website: cityoflongton.com

Longton is a city in Elk County, Kansas, United States, along the Elk River. As of the 2020 census, the population of the city was 288.

== History ==
Longton was founded in 1870. It was named after Longton, England.

The first post office in Longton was established in August, 1870.

== Geography ==
According to the United States Census Bureau, the city has a total area of 1.16 square miles (3.00 km^{2}), of which 1.15 square miles (2.98 km^{2}) is land and 0.01 square miles (0.03 km^{2}) is water.

=== Climate ===
The climate in this area is characterized by hot, humid summers and generally mild to cool winters. According to the Köppen Climate Classification system, Longton has a humid subtropical climate, abbreviated "Cfa" on climate maps.

== Demographics ==
Historical population
Census	Pop.	Note	%±
1880	255		—
1890	624		144.7%
1900	564		−9.6%
1910	611		8.3%
1920	583		−4.6%
1930	744		27.6%
1940	629		−15.5%
1950	478		−24.0%
1960	401		−16.1%
1970	304		−24.2%
1980	396		30.3%
1990	389		−1.8%
2000	394		1.3%
2010	348		−11.7%
2020	288		−17.2%
U.S. Decennial Census

=== 2020 census ===
The 2020 United States census counted 288 people, 113 households, and 61 families in Longton. The population density was 245.1 per square mile (94.6/km^{2}). There were 172 housing units at an average density of 146.4 per square mile (56.5/km^{2}). The racial makeup was 94.44% (272) white or European American (93.75% non-Hispanic white), 0.35% (1) black or African-American, 2.08% (6) Native American or Alaska Native, 0.0% (0) Asian, 0.0% (0) Pacific Islander or Native Hawaiian, 0.35% (1) from other races, and 2.78% (8) from two or more races. Hispanic or Latino of any race was 2.08% (6) of the population.

Of the 113 households, 25.7% had children under the age of 18; 42.5% were married couples living together; 27.4% had a female householder with no spouse or partner present. 38.1% of households consisted of individuals and 23.0% had someone living alone who was 65 years of age or older. The average household size was 2.2 and the average family size was 2.9. The percent of those with a bachelor's degree or higher was estimated to be 13.9% of the population.

24.3% of the population was under the age of 18, 6.9% from 18 to 24, 21.5% from 25 to 44, 25.3% from 45 to 64, and 21.9% who were 65 years of age or older. The median age was 40.8 years. For every 100 females, there were 107.2 males. For every 100 females ages 18 and older, there were 111.7 males.

The 2016–2020 5-year American Community Survey estimates show that the median household income was $38,672 (with a margin of error of +/- $5,813) and the median family income was $44,271 (+/- $12,789). Males had a median income of $26,786 (+/- $6,358) versus $18,661 (+/- $2,752) for females. The median income for those above 16 years old was $23,750 (+/- $2,898). Approximately, 3.7% of families and 8.0% of the population were below the poverty line, including 5.0% of those under the age of 18 and 12.2% of those ages 65 or over.

=== 2010 census ===
As of the census of 2010, there were 348 people, 147 households, and 97 families residing in the city. The population density was 302.6 inhabitants per square mile (116.8/km^{2}). There were 189 housing units at an average density of 164.3 per square mile (63.4/km^{2}). The racial makeup of the city was 94.3% White, 1.4% Native American, 1.4% from other races, and 2.9% from two or more races. Hispanic or Latino of any race were 4.0% of the population.

There were 147 households, of which 34.7% had children under the age of 18 living with them, 46.3% were married couples living together, 13.6% had a female householder with no husband present, 6.1% had a male householder with no wife present, and 34.0% were non-families. 32.0% of all households were made up of individuals, and 19% had someone living alone who was 65 years of age or older. The average household size was 2.37 and the average family size was 2.93.

The median age in the city was 38.3 years. 29.6% of residents were under the age of 18; 7.5% were between the ages of 18 and 24; 22.4% were from 25 to 44; 23.2% were from 45 to 64; and 17.2% were 65 years of age or older. The gender makeup of the city was 50.3% male and 49.7% female.

=== 2000 census ===
As of the census of 2000, there were 394 people, 163 households, and 98 families residing in the city. The population density was 342.6 inhabitants per square mile (132.3/km^{2}). There were 193 housing units at an average density of 167.8 per square mile (64.8/km^{2}). The racial makeup of the city was 94.67% White, 2.28% Native American, 0.25% Pacific Islander, 0.76% from other races, and 2.03% from two or more races. Hispanic or Latino of any race were 3.30% of the population.

There were 163 households, out of which 35.0% had children under the age of 18 living with them, 44.8% were married couples living together, 10.4% had a female householder with no husband present, and 39.3% were non-families. 38.0% of all households were made up of individuals, and 24.5% had someone living alone who was 65 years of age or older. The average household size was 2.42 and the average family size was 3.25.

In the city, the population was spread out, with 32.0% under the age of 18, 7.6% from 18 to 24, 21.3% from 25 to 44, 20.6% from 45 to 64, and 18.5% who were 65 years of age or older. The median age was 36 years. For every 100 females, there were 87.6 males. For every 100 females age 18 and over, there were 84.8 males.

The median income for a household in the city was $20,469, and the median income for a family was $29,625. Males had a median income of $23,750 versus $16,477 for females. The per capita income for the city was $10,802. About 13.9% of families and 20.1% of the population were below the poverty line, including 23.9% of those under age 18 and 23.9% of those age 65 or over.

== Education ==
The community is served by Elk Valley USD 283 public school district.
