= West Elk USD 282 =

Public school district in Howard, Kansas

Address
- 1199 St Highway 99 Howard, Kansas, 67349; United States
- Coordinates: 37.46108°N 96.25418°W

District information
- Type: Public
- Grades: PreK to 12

Other information
- Website: westelk.us

West Elk USD 282 is a public unified school district headquartered in Howard, Kansas, United States. The district includes the communities of Elk Falls, Howard, Moline, Severy, and nearby rural areas.

== Schools ==
The school district operates the following schools:

- West Elk School

== See also ==
- Kansas State Department of Education
- Kansas State High School Activities Association
- List of high schools in Kansas
- List of unified school districts in Kansas
