= Elk Falls, Kansas =

City in Elk County, Kansas

- City
- Location within Elk County and Kansas

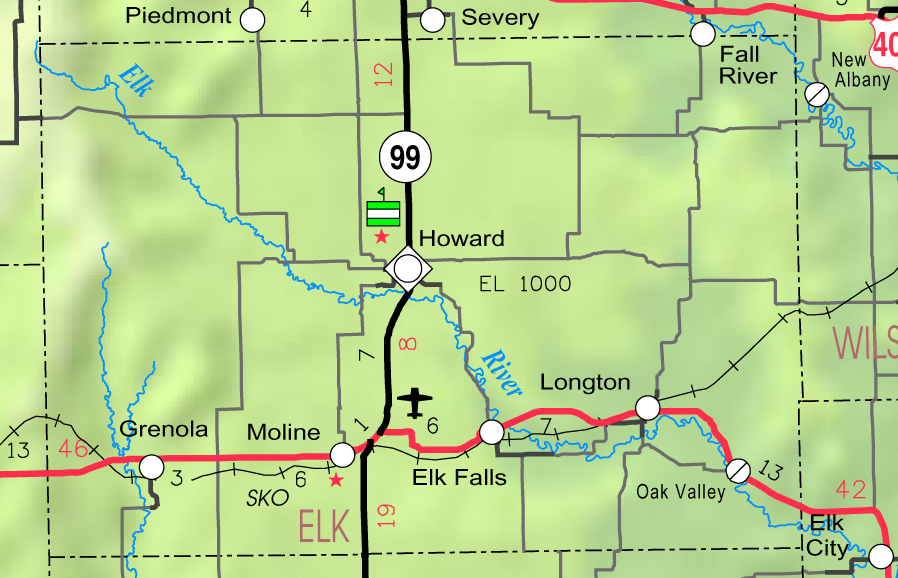
- KDOT map of Elk County (legend)
- Coordinates: 37°22′24″N 96°11′36″W
- Country: United States
- State: Kansas
- County: Elk
- Founded: 1870
- Incorporated: 1887
- Named for: Falls on Elk River

Government
  - Type: Mayor–Council

Area
  - Total: 0.73 sq mi (1.89 km^{2})
  - Land: 0.73 sq mi (1.88 km^{2})
  - Water: 0 sq mi (0.00 km^{2})
- Elevation: 965 ft (294 m)

Population (2020)
  - Total: 113
  - Density: 156/sq mi (60.1/km^{2})
- Time zone: UTC-6 (CST)
  - Summer (DST): UTC-5 (CDT)
- ZIP Code: 67345
- Area code: 620
- FIPS code: 20-20300
- GNIS ID: 2394648

Elk Falls is a city in Elk County, Kansas, United States, along the Elk River. As of the 2020 census, the population of the city was 113.

== History ==
The first European-American house was built at Elk Falls in 1870, and a post office was opened that same year. Elk Falls was named for a waterfall on the Elk River, near where the town developed. Two early settlers in the rural community were the widow Prudence Crandall (who took back her maiden name after her husband died), an educator from Connecticut who had established the Canterbury Female Boarding School in the 1830s for African-American girls and young women; and her brother Hezekiah. They both died here and were buried in the town cemetery.

== Geography ==
According to the United States Census Bureau, the city has a total area of 0.87 square miles (2.25 km^{2}), of which 0.86 square miles (2.23 km^{2}) is land and 0.01 square miles (0.03 km^{2}) is water.

== Demographics ==
Historical population
Census	Pop.	Note	%±
1880	513		—
1890	350		−31.8%
1910	271		—
1920	203		−25.1%
1930	288		41.9%
1940	294		2.1%
1950	276		−6.1%
1960	179		−35.1%
1970	124		−30.7%
1980	151		21.8%
1990	122		−19.2%
2000	112		−8.2%
2010	107		−4.5%
2020	113		5.6%
U.S. Decennial Census

=== 2020 census ===
The 2020 United States census counted 113 people, 54 households, and 34 families in Elk Falls. The population density was 155.4 per square mile (60.0/km^{2}). There were 55 housing units at an average density of 75.7 per square mile (29.2/km^{2}). The racial makeup was 89.38% (101) white or European American (88.5% non-Hispanic white), 0.0% (0) black or African-American, 0.88% (1) Native American or Alaska Native, 0.0% (0) Asian, 0.0% (0) Pacific Islander or Native Hawaiian, 0.88% (1) from other races, and 8.85% (10) from two or more races. Hispanic or Latino of any race was 5.31% (6) of the population.

Of the 54 households, 20.4% had children under the age of 18; 46.3% were married couples living together; 13.0% had a female householder with no spouse or partner present. 27.8% of households consisted of individuals and 16.7% had someone living alone who was 65 years of age or older. The average household size was 1.8 and the average family size was 2.5. The percent of those with a bachelor's degree or higher was estimated to be 30.1% of the population.

26.5% of the population was under the age of 18, 1.8% from 18 to 24, 12.4% from 25 to 44, 30.1% from 45 to 64, and 29.2% who were 65 years of age or older. The median age was 56.2 years. For every 100 females, there were 85.2 males. For every 100 females ages 18 and older, there were 76.6 males.

The 2016–2020 5-year American Community Survey estimates show that the median household income was $26,667 (with a margin of error of +/- $21,261) and the median family income was $58,750 (+/- $31,140). Approximately, 0.0% of families and 14.4% of the population were below the poverty line, including 0.0% of those under the age of 18 and 0.0% of those ages 65 or over.

=== 2010 census ===
As of the census of 2010, there were 107 people, 54 households, and 33 families residing in the city. The population density was 124.4 inhabitants per square mile (48.0/km^{2}). There were 68 housing units at an average density of 79.1 per square mile (30.5/km^{2}). The racial makeup of the city was 92.5% White, 1.9% Native American, 0.9% Asian, and 4.7% from two or more races. Hispanic or Latino of any race were 0.9% of the population.

There were 54 households, of which 16.7% had children under the age of 18 living with them, 50.0% were married couples living together, 9.3% had a female householder with no husband present, 1.9% had a male householder with no wife present, and 38.9% were non-families. 35.2% of all households were made up of individuals, and 22.2% had someone living alone who was 65 years of age or older. The average household size was 1.98 and the average family size was 2.52.

The median age in the city was 52.9 years. 16.8% of residents were under the age of 18; 2.9% were between the ages of 18 and 24; 9.3% were from 25 to 44; 42.9% were from 45 to 64; and 28% were 65 years of age or older. The gender makeup of the city was 45.8% male and 54.2% female.

== Education ==
The community is served by West Elk USD 282 public school district. West Elk High School is located in Howard. The West Elk High School mascot is Patriots.
