= Jake L. Hamon Jr. =

American oil man and philanthropist (1902–1985)

- Born: Jake Louis Hamon; July 24, 1902; Lawton, Oklahoma, U.S.
- Died: 1985 (aged 82–83); Amsterdam, Netherlands
- Education: University of Chicago
- Occupation: Oilman
- Political party: Republican
- Spouse: Nancy Blackburn
- Children: 2 sons, 1 daughter
- Parent(s): Jake Louis Hamon; Georgia Perkins
- Relatives: Olivebelle Hamon (sister)

Jake L. Hamon Jr. (July 24, 1902 – 1985) was an American oilman and philanthropist.

== Early life and education ==
Jake L. Hamon Jr. was born on July 24, 1902, in Lawton, Oklahoma. He was named after his father; his mother was Georgia Perkins. He spent his childhood in Ardmore, Oklahoma.

Hamon attended the University of Chicago for two years. He dropped out of college in 1920, when his father was shot to death.

== Career and philanthropy ==
Hamon started his career in Ranger, Texas, in 1920 and drilled his own well a year later. He subsequently partnered with oilman Edwin B. Cox (Edwin L. Cox's father), and established a corporate office in Dallas, Texas, in 1932. The two men worked together until 1950.

Hamon served on the board of directors of the American Petroleum Institute in 1934. He subsequently served as the president of the National Stripper Well Association, the Texas Mid-Continent Oil and Gas Association, and the Mid-Continent Oil and Gas Association. During World War II, he served as a member of the Petroleum Industry Council for National Defense. He was inducted in the Oklahoma Hall of Fame in 1968.

Hamon founded the Hamon Oil Company in 1984.

Hamon made charitable contributions to the Dallas Museum of Art, and he served on the board of trustees of the Dallas Zoological Society and Southern Methodist University. He was also on the board of the Cotton Bowl Athletic Association.

== Personal life ==
Hamon married Nancy Blackburn on March 28, 1949. They had two sons and a daughter. Hamon was a personal friend of former President George H. W. Bush. Hamon and his wife visited the Bushes in China when Bush served as Envoy to China in March 1975.

Hamon died in 1985 while he was on vacation in Amsterdam.
