= List of Grand Army of the Republic posts in Kansas =

This is a list of Grand Army of the Republic (G.A.R.) posts in Kansas, United States.

The G.A.R., Department of Kansas was established December 7, 1866. It was preceded by an organization known as the Veteran Brotherhood (and Union Brotherhood), State of Kansas organized in December 1865. The Department of Kansas was permanently reorganized on March 16, 1880, after several years of disorganization. The first statewide encampment was held in Topeka in 1882. The last state encampment was held in Emporia in 1943.

Over 28,000 Civil War veterans lived in Kansas after 1865; the overwhelming number of these men were Union veterans. At its peak in the late 1880s, the G.A.R. in Kansas had over 19,000 members in 478 posts.

== Kansas G.A.R. posts ==
Post name	Image	Post number	Post location	Named for
Lincoln		1	Topeka	Abraham Lincoln
Vance		2	Hays	unknown
Jewell		3	Pleasanton	Lewis R. Jewell
McPherson		4	Independence	James B. McPherson
Kearny		5	Washington	Philip Kearny
Custer		6	Leavenworth	George Armstrong Custer
Wadsworth		7	Council Grove	James S. Wadsworth
B. F. Larned		8	Larned	Benjamin F. Larned
Lyon		9	Marysville	Nathaniel Lyon
Sumner		10	Kansas City	Charles Sumner
Canby		11	Osage City	Edward Canby
Washington		12	Lawrence	George Washington
Osterhaus		13 (1882–1888)	Prescott	Peter Joseph Osterhaus
Elsmore		13 (1889–1924)	Elsmore	post location
Meade		14	Sterling	George Meade
John W. Geary		15	Cottonwood Falls	John W. Geary
Allison		16	Burlington	unknown
Joe Hooker		17	Hutchinson	Joseph Hooker
George H. Thomas		18	Ottawa	George Henry Thomas
Lyndon		19	Lyndon	post location
Kit Carson		20	Lyons	Christopher Carson
Johnson		21 (1882–1884)	Hanover	Andrew Johnson
Mound		21 (1887–1894; 1915)	Gridley	unknown
Ft. Donelson		21 (1901–1909)	St. Marys	Battle of Fort Donelson
Ellsworth		22	Ellsworth	Fort Ellsworth
E. M. Stanton		23	Howard	Edwin M. Stanton
Sedgwick		24	Clifton	John Sedgwick
Garfield		25	Wichita	James A. Garfield
Rawlins		26	Elk Falls	John Aaron Rawlins
Upton		27	Caldwell	Emory Upton
Burnside		28	Kansas City	Ambrose Burnside
Ed Lines		29	Alma	Edward C. D. Lines
Sherman		30	Ness City	William Tecumseh Sherman
J. G. Blunt		31	Linn	James G. Blunt
William H. Lytle		32	Fort Scott	William Haines Lytle
Montgomery		33	Mound City	unknown
Jim Lane		34	Mankato	James H. Lane
E. P. Sheldon		35	Burlingame	Edwin Pomeroy Sheldon
Judson Kilpatrick		36	Newton	Hugh Judson Kilpatrick
Farragut		37	Burrton	David Farragut
O. P. Morton		38	Wamego	Oliver P. Morton
Custard		39	Onaga	Amos J. Custard
E. D. Baker		40	Baldwin City	Edward Dickinson Baker
Winfield Scott / Hill City		41	Millbrook / Hill City	Winfield Scott / post location
Pollock		42	Marion	unknown
Reynolds		43	Cawker City	John F. Reynolds
John Brown		44	Belleville	John Brown
Robert Anderson		45	Smith Center	Robert Anderson
Will Wendell		46	Holton	unknown
Kenesaw [sic]		47	Minneapolis	Battle of Kennesaw Mountain
S. A. Hurlburt [sic]		48	Ellinwood	Stephen A. Hurlbut
Gen. Bailey		49	Girard	Joseph Bailey
Dick Yates		50	Eureka	unknown
McCook		51	Iola	Alexander McDowell McCook
Pap Thomas		52	Great Bend	George H. Thomas
Henderson		53	Frankfort	unknown
F. P. Blair		54	Galena	Francis Preston Blair Jr.
Preston B. Plumb		55	Emporia	Preston B. Plumb
Shiloh		56	Cherokee	Battle of Shiloh
James Shields		57	Wellington	unknown
S. R. Deach		58	Jewell	Samuel R. Deach
John A. Dix		59	Columbus	John Adams Dix
Dahlgren		60 (1882)	Ness City	John A. Dahlgren
Alta Vista		60 (1887–1908)	Alta Vista	post location
A. M. Kirkpatrick		60 (1916–1918)	La Harpe	Andrew Marshall Kirkpatrick, M.D.
Benton		61 (1882–1895)	Anthony	William Plummer Benton
H. W. Lawton		61 (1899–1934)	Anthony	Henry Ware Lawton
Jesse Nelson		62	Tecumseh	unknown
Abilene		63	Abilene	post location
Antietam		64	Parsons	Battle of Antietam
Gen. Russell		65	Pittsburg	David Allen Russell
W. H. L. Wallace		66	El Dorado	W. H. L. Wallace
Chickamauga		67	Scranton	Battle of Chickamauga
Franklin		68	Olathe	Battle of Franklin
O. M. Mitchell [sic]		69	Osborne	Ormsby M. Mitchel
Gettysburg		70 (1883–1905)	Hollenberg	Battle of Gettysburg
Labette		70 (1906–1908)	Labette	post location
Gen. Rice		71	Topeka	Americus V. Rice
Vicksburg		72	Humboldt	Siege of Vicksburg
Neosho Falls / B. F. Goss		73	Neosho Falls	post location / Benjamin F. Goss
Stone River [sic]		74	Sedan	Battle of Stones River
Eskridge / W. H. Earl		75	Eskridge	post location / William Henry Earl
Stockton		76	Stockton	post location
Phillipsburg		77	Phillipsburg	post location
Ionia		78	Ionia	post location
Brownlow		79	Severy	William Gannaway Brownlow
Resaca		80	Williamsburg	Battle of Resaca
Kirby-Smith [sic]		81 (1882–1885)	Haddam	Joseph L. Kirby Smith
Ness		81 (1887–1894)	Bazine	Noah V. Ness
Parsons		81 (1897–1934)	Parsons	post location
Gen. Strong		82	Jetmore	George Crockett Strong
Reno		83	Nickerson	Jesse L. Reno
Silas Miller		84	Canton	Silas Miller
Siverd		85	Winfield	Hugh Hicks Siverd
Pomona		86 (1882–1887)	Pomona	post location
L. P. Wilkes		86 (1887–1930)	Dwight	Leander P. Wilkes
James B. McPherson		87	McPherson	James B. McPherson
Phil Sheridan		88	Clay Center	Philip Sheridan
Peabody		89	Peabody	post location
John Goldy		90 (1882–1907)	Milan	John D. Goldy
Sheridan		90 (1908–1936)	Coffeyville	Philip Sheridan
Mulligan		91	Longton	James A. Mulligan
George Graham		92	Seneca	George Graham
Atchison / John A. Martin		93	Atchison	post location / John A. Martin
Col. J. Hays		94	Carbondale	unknown
General Mower		95	Millard	Joseph A. Mower
Lookout		96	Wellsville	Battle of Lookout Mountain
Douglass		97	Douglass	Joseph W. Douglass
Phil Harvey		98	Fredonia	unknown
Cedar Vale		99	Cedar Vale	post location
Lew Gove		100 (1882-1933)	Manhattan	Greenville Lewis Gove
Chase		101	Beattie	Salmon P. Chase
A. J. Smith		102	Fontana	Andrew Jackson Smith
DeLong		103 (1883–1885)	St. John	unknown
C. F. Smith		103 (1887–1924)	St. John	Charles Ferguson Smith
Gen. Curtis		104	Spring Hill	Samuel Curtis
L. E. King		105	Augusta	unknown
Gen. H. C. Bull		106	Bull City / Alton	Hiram C. Bull
Collyer		107	Collyer	post location
Knowlton		108	Ottumwa	unknown
I. B. Richardson		109	Miltonvale	Israel B. Richardson
E. O. C. Ord		110	Moline	Edward Ord
Princeton		111	Princeton	post location
Fall River		112	Fall River	post location
Concordia / W. T. Sherman		113	Concordia	post location / William Tecumseh Sherman
G. K. Warren		114	Osage Mission	Gouverneur K. Warren
Wilson		115	Wilson	post location
Wilderness		116	Delphos	Battle of the Wilderness
McCaslin		117	Paola	Maxwell McCaslin
Pea Ridge		118	Chetopa	Battle of Pea Ridge
New Albany		119	New Albany	post location
Leavenworth		120 (1883–1885)	Leavenworth	post location
Newton		120 (1897–1902)	Newton	post location
Cumberland		121 (1883–1893)	Salem	Army of the Cumberland
G. W. Harrison		121 (1894–1909)	Andover	George W. Harrison
Kirwin		122	Kirwin	post location
Baxter Springs		123	Baxter Springs	post location
Prairie Grove		124	Kansas Center / Frederick	Battle of Prairie Grove
Leon		125	Leon	post location
Sackett		126	Irving	William A. Sackett
John A. Logan		127	Salina	John A. Logan
Elk City		128	Elk City	post location
Neosho		129	Chanute	post location
Hiawatha		130	Hiawatha	post location
Bridge		131	Gypsum	unknown
Junction City		132	Junction City	post location
Dexter / H. C. McDorman		133 (1882–1896)	Dexter	post location / Henry C. McDorman
Wabaunsee / McKinley		133 (1898–1908)	Wabaunsee	post location / William McKinley
Greenleaf		134	Greenleaf	post location
O. R. Powers		135	Netawaka	unknown
Medicine		136 (1883–1886)	Raceburgh / High Hill	post location
Henry Dunn		136 (1887–1888)	Woodston	Henry Dunn
Ad Astra		136 (1894–1902)	Chanute	state motto [part]
Wallace		137 (1883–1887)	Scandia	Lew Wallace
Sandy Valley		137 (1891–1900)	Middleton	unknown
N. B. Page		138	Whiting	unknown
Mound Valley		139	Mound Valley	post location
Jayhawker		140	Waushara / Admire	nickname
Pawnee		141 (1882–1890)	Cora	Pawnee people
Galesburg		141 (1894–1917)	Galesburg	post location
Hackleman		142	Cherryvale	Pleasant A. Hackleman
Hepler		143 (1883–1885)	Hepler	post location
W. D. Conn		143 (1889–1890)	Alanthus	unknown
Natoma		143 (1894–1899)	Natoma	post location
Havensville		144	Havensville	post location
Humphrey		145	Neodesha	post location
Circleville		146	Circleville	post location
Beloit		147	Beloit	post location
G. W. Smith		148 (1883–1885)	Fort Riley	George Washington Smith, Sr.
C. C. Myser		148 (1886–1914)	Toledo	Calvin C. Myser
Tonganoxie		149 (1883–1892)	Tonganoxie	post location
S. S. Perry		149 (1894–1898)	Wallace	unknown
Oswego		150	Oswego	post location
Westmoreland		151	Westmoreland	post location
Bunker Hill		152	Bunker Hill	post location
Coffeyville		153	Coffeyville	post location
James Montgomery		154	Uniontown	James Montgomery
Jules Williams		155	Oskaloosa	Jules Legender Williams
Osage		156	McCune	Osage people
Corinth		157 (1883)	Monmouth	Siege of Corinth
John Anderson		157 (1884–1907)	Wilder	John Anderson
Arkansas City		158	Arkansas City	post location
Conforth		159	Clyde	unknown
Meriden		160	Meriden	post location
Winchester		161 (1883–1892)	Crystal Plains	Battle of Winchester
Gen. Slocum		161 (1895–1910)	Tonganoxie	Henry Warner Slocum
Gaylord		162 (1883–1886)	Brownell	unknown
James Fear		162 (1889–1916)	Brownell	James Fear
Oneida		163	Oneida	post location
Larrabee		164	Russell	unknown
H. Z. Curtis		165	Keelville / Melrose	Henry Z. Curtis
Soldier / James B. Kyle		166	Soldier	post location / James B. Kyle
John L. Graham		167	Wetmore	unknown
Sumter		168	Winchester	Battle of Fort Sumter
Dunlap		169	Dunlap	post location
R. B. Mitchell		170	La Cygne	Robert Byington Mitchell
George Ellis		171	Ellis	unknown
Burden		172	Burden	post location
Scottsville		173	Scottsville	post location
Eldred		174	Medicine Lodge	unknown
Sabetha		175	Sabetha	post location
Cloud		176 (1883–1888)	Central City	William F. Cloud
R. B. Hayes		176 (1893–1930)	Pratt	Rutherford B. Hayes
Logan		177	Logan	post location
Ohio Grove		178 (1883–1888)	Minneapolis	unknown
Steadman Hatch		178 (1889–1896)	Partridge	unknown
Sylvan Grove		178 (1902–1915)	Sylvan Grove	post location
Meacham		179	Colony	unknown
Rufus Gilpatrick		180	Garnett	unknown
Long Island		181	Long Island	post location
J. B. Milroy		182	Lenora	unknown
Mulberry Grove		183	Mulberry	post location
Charley Aldrich		184	Cedarville	unknown
Woodson		185	Yates Center	Woodson County
H. H. Free		186	Burr Oak	unknown
Madison		187	Madison	post location
Centralia		188	Centralia	post location
Buford		189	Halstead	John Buford
Orloff Norton		190	Le Roy	Orloff Norton
Severance		191	Severance	post location
Rousseau		192 (1883–1886)	Shady Bend	Lovell Rousseau
Bies		192 (1889–1899)	Brewster	unknown
Sargent		193 (1883–1889)	Little River	unknown
Russell Springs		193 (1889–1899)	Russell Springs	post location
Little River		193 (1900–1914)	Little River	post location
Sgt. R. Mercer		194 (1883–1893)	Leonardville	unknown
W. M. Richardson		194 (1902–1925)	Admire	unknown
Wier		195	Pardee	unknown
Hartford		196 (1883–1892)	Hartford	post location
I. A. Taylor		196 (1893–1918)	Hartford	Isaac A. Taylor
Capt. Trego		197	WaKeeney	Edgar Poe Trego
T. E. G. Ransom		198	Oberlin	Thomas E. G. Ransom
Toronto		199	Toronto	post location
Col. Givens		200	Hallowell	unknown
U. S. Grant		201	Elmdale	Ulysses S. Grant
Marion		202	Florence	unknown
Mulvane		203	Mulvane	post location
Col. H. P. Johnson		204 (1883–1885)	Urbana	Hamilton P. Johnson
Ulysses		204 (1886–1903)	Ulysses	post location
Westphalia		205 (1883–1886)	Westphalia	post location
Liberal		205 (1889–1920)	Liberal	post location
Armourdale		206 (1882–1886)	Armourdale	post location
Earlton		206 (1886–1914)	Earlton	post location
Silver Lake		207	Silver Lake	post location
Col. R. G. Shaw		208	Leavenworth	Robert Gould Shaw
Capt. Jarvis		209	Norton	unknown
Sgt. McCoy		210	Randolph	unknown
White Rock Valley		211 (1883–1885)	White Rock	post location
H. M. Dobyns		211 (1885–1895)	Opolis	Henry Miskell Dobyns
Harbine		212	Harbine	post location
Knoxville		213 (1883–1885)	Kingston	Knoxville Campaign
Floral		213 (1886–1905)	Floral	post location
Atwood		214	Atwood	post location
Bennington		215	Bennington	post location
Col. McElvaine		216 (1883–1884)	Luray	unknown
J. Y. Smith		216 (1884–1890)	Plum Grove	Jesse Yost Smith
Winfield Scott		216 (1890–1924)	Scott City	Winfield Scott
Roanoke		217	Oak Valley	Battle of Roanoke Island
Chautauqua Springs		218	Chautauqua	post location
Col. Shane		219 (1883–1885)	Holyrood	John Shane
Banner City		219 (1887–1897)	Banner City	post location
T. R. Stanley		220 (1883–1889)	Weir	unknown
Quenemo		221	Quenemo	post location
LaCrosse		222	La Crosse	post location
Elmwood		223	Shibboleth / Dresden	unknown
Eagle		224	Chase	unknown
Capt. Lewis Stafford		225	Valley Falls	Lewis Stafford
Col. J. J. Jones		226	Formoso	John J. Jones
Rough and Ready		227 (1883–1884)	Star Valley	Zachary Taylor's nickname
Tim McCarthy		227 (1887–1898)	Burdett	unknown
Delaware		228	Ozawkie	Delaware River
Bridgeport		229	Bridgeport	post location
Belmont		230 (1883–1889)	Crestline	Battle of Belmont
J. W. Mackey		230 (1890–1895)	Pomona	unknown
Walnut		231	Walnut	post location
Capt. Ben Greenman		232	Downs	Benjamin Franklin Greenman
A. W. Farr		233 (1883)	Empire City	unknown
Magbie		233 (1884–1885)	Simpson	unknown
McConnell		233 (1889–1892)	Blakeman	unknown
Neosho Rapids		233 (1895–1901)	Neosho Rapids	post location
Gen. Ed. Kitchen		234 (1883–1886)	Montana	unknown
W. S. Harney		234 (1889–1899)	Coolidge	unknown
Brookville		235	Brookville	post location
W. H. Grimes		236	Atchison	William H. Grimes, M.D.
Fitz Henry Warren		237 (1883–1887)	Netherland	Fitz Henry Warren
Conrad Baker		237 (1887–1889)	Voltaire	unknown
Overbrook		237 (1889–1903)	Overbrook	post location
Melvern		238	Melvern	post location
Glasco		239	Glasco	post location
Lebanon		240	Lebanon	post location
T. O. Howe		241	Kinsley	unknown
Perryville		242	Arlington	Battle of Perryville
Altoona		243	Altoona	post location
Wm. R. Creighton		244 (1883–1887)	Covert	William R. Creighton
Ingalls		244 (1889–1891)	Ingalls	post location
Eggleston		244 (1894–1932)	Wichita	Beroth Bullard Eggleston
Equity		245	Equity	post location
Thompson		246	Vermillion	unknown
Waverly		247	Waverly	post location
Volunteer		248	Coyville	unknown
Americus		249	Americus	post location
Blue		250	North Topeka	unknown
Harper		251	Harper	post location
Louisburg		252	Louisburg	post location
Axtell		253	Axtell	post location
Sanders		254	Moran	unknown
Stephenson		255	Sedgwick	unknown
Ft. Donelson		256 (1883–1888)	St. Marys	Battle of Fort Donelson
McDanield		256 (1889–1932)	Bonner Springs	Hugh F. McDanield
James R. Fulton		257	Garden City	James R. Fulton
Gen. Hazen		258	Lincoln	William Babcock Hazen
Corning		259	Corning	post location
Waterville		260	Waterville	post location
Galesburg		261 (1883–1889)	Galesburg	post location
Glen Elder		261 (1890–1898)	Glen Elder	post location
Dover		262 (1883–1886)	Dover	post location
John Morgan		262 (1887–1888)	Rago	unknown
Centropolis		262 (1889–1891)	Centropolis	post location
Baldwin		262 (1891–1901)	Derby	unknown
Portis		263	Portis	post location
R. B. Burley		264	Blue Mound	unknown
Kingman		265	Kingman	post location
Griffin		266	Ada	unknown
Copeland-Goodwin		267 (1883–1892)	Pratt	unknown
J. H. Howe		267 (1894–1915)	Kanorado	unknown
Topping		268	Altamont	unknown
Washburn		269	Twin Falls / Neal	Cadwallader C. Washburn
Atlanta		270	Buffalo	Battle of Atlanta
Gen. Lander		271 (1883–1889)	Lane	Frederick W. Lander
W. H. Baker		271 (1890–1893)	Lane	William H. Baker
Manhattan		271 (1894–1920)	Manhattan	post location
Cato		272	Cato	post location
Grubb		273	Jamestown	unknown
Bronson		274 (1883–1890)	Bronson	post location
Barnhill		274 (1891–1924)	Lost Springs	unknown
Jack Judy		275	Lancaster	John J. Judy
Agniel / Effingham		276	Effingham	unknown / post location
Sill		277 (1883–1889)	South Cedar / Mayetta	Joshua W. Sill
A. R. Chapin		277 (1895–1904)	Virgil	unknown
Monitor		278	Nortonville	USS Monitor
McLouth		279	McLouth	post location
Fisher		280	White City	William D. Fisher
McFarland		281	Muscotah	unknown
Huron		282 (1883–1889)	Huron	post location
W. H. Grinter		282 (1895–1914)	Edwardsville	unknown
Nathan Price		283	Wathena	Nathan Price
Bristow		284 (1883–1886)	Bristow	post location
Sylvester Griffin		284 (1889–1917)	Milford	unknown
Virgil		285 (1884–1888)	Virgil	post location
Achilles		285 (1889–1900)	Achilles	post location
Cedron		286	Cedron / Blue Hill	post location
Center Ridge		287 (1883–1886)	Center Ridge	post location
Buffalo		287 (1889–1899)	Buffalo	post location
Corinth		288	Perry	Siege of Corinth
Appomattox		289	Grenola	Battle of Appomattox Court House
Drywood		290 (1883–1884)	Memphis	unknown
McDowell		290 (1886–1904)	Hoxie	Irvin McDowell
Chattanooga		291	Peoria	Chattanooga Campaign
Kennedy		292	Troy	unknown
Oxford		293 (1883)	Oxford	post location
U. S. Grant		293 (1885–1892)	Lansing	Ulysses S. Grant
Victor		293 (1896–1935)	Fort Dodge	unknown
Lewis		294	Dodge City	unknown
Goodspeed		295 (1883–1897)	Reading	unknown
Gen. W. S. Rosecrans		295 (1898–1917)	Reading	William Rosecrans
James A. Garfield		296	Garfield	James A. Garfield
Bald Hill / Culver		297 (1883–1893)	Culver	post location
Richard Rowett		297 (1894–1921)	Culver	Richard Rowett
Plainville		298	Plainville	post location
Myles Keogh		299 (1884–1885)	Kinsley	Myles Keogh
Rosedale		299 (1885–1887)	Rosedale	post location
Englewood		299 (1887–1895)	Englewood	post location
Sylvan Grove		300 (1883–1889)	Sylvan Grove	post location
James M. Arthur		300 (1890–1916)	Goodrich	unknown
Henry Hopkins		301	Stafford	unknown
Steadman		302 (1884–1887)	Terra Cotta	unknown
Charles O. Rovohl		302 (1889–1912)	Colby	unknown
Haskell		303 (1884–1885)	Arcadia	unknown
George I. Ransom		303 (1886–1924)	Kansas City	unknown
Iuka		304	Oak Hill	Battle of Iuka
Private Samuel Pike		305 (1883–1896)	Towanda	unknown
J. D. Godfrey		305 (1896–1912)	Towanda	John D. Godfrey
Fulton		306 (1884–1886)	Fulton	post location
Gen. Rawlings [sic]		306 (1886–1892)	Bushton	John Aaron Rawlins
Judson		307 (1883–1889)	Xenia	unknown
Marvin		307 (1889–1897)	Marvin	post location
Marquette		308	Marquette	post location
Marcus Amsden		309 (1884–1886)	Palmer	unknown
Claflin		309 (1887–1915)	Claflin	post location
Billy Hughes		310	Republic	unknown
Erie		311	Erie	post location
Edmond		312	Edmond	post location
Pine Bluff		313	Edgerton	Battle of Pine Bluff
Thomas Doane		314	Lebo	unknown
J. M. Frank		315 (1884–1886)	Greeley	unknown
Gen. H. D. Washburn		315 (1888–1889)	Alden	Henry D. Washburn
Wm. Logdson		315 (1896–1899)	Bigelow	unknown
Geuda		316 (1884–1885)	Geuda Springs	post location
Joseph Butterfield		316 (1886–1926)	Greensburg	Joseph W. Butterfield
M. M. Crocker		317	Galva	Marcellus M. Crocker
Lenexa		318 (1884–1888)	Lenexa	post location
Capt. Ames		318 (1888–1920)	Lenexa	unknown
Raymond		319	Raymond	post location
Dick Root		320 (1884–1889)	Delhi	unknown
Gen. Crook		320 (1890–1900)	Weir	George Crook
Ft. Pillow		321	North Topeka	Battle of Fort Pillow
Fletcher Webster		322 (1884–1886)	Roxbury	unknown
Osawatomie		322 (1889–1894; 1900–1928)	Osawatomie	post location
New Salem		323	New Salem	post location
Grand Center		324 (1884–1885)	Cowley	unknown
Atlanta		324 (1885–1886)	Atlanta	post location
Cowley		324 (1886–1901)	Atlanta	Matthew Cowley
W. H. Rankin		325	Cheney	William Harvey Rankin
Gregory		326 (1884–1887)	Pawnee Rock	unknown
Gordon Granger		326 (1890–1897)	Aurora / Sulphur Springs	Gordon Granger
Col. Fulton		327	Rossville	unknown
Robert Hale		328	Blue Rapids	unknown
Gen. Merrill		329 (1884–1885)	Torrance	Lewis Merrill
O. P. Morton		329 (1885–1909)	Wilson	Oliver P. Morton
Veteran		330	Veteran	post location
Liberty		331 (1884–1886)	Liberty	post location
Harker		331 (1889)	Luray	Charles Garrison Harker
Jonathan Wadley		331 (1896–1901)	Webber	Jonathan Wadley
White Cloud		332	White Cloud	post location
Eudora		333	Eudora	post location
Caney		334 (1884–1886)	Caney	post location
Miles Hart / Maple City		334 (1889–1916)	Maple City	unknown / post location
Charles F. Warriner		335	Valley Center	unknown
E. C. Johnson		336	Atchison	unknown
Belle Plaine		337 (1884–1898)	Belle Plaine	post location
Gen. George Crook		337 (1899–1935)	Belle Plaine	George Crook
Gen. Carlin		338 (1884–1885)	Stuart	William Carlin
Springfield		338 (1868–1888)	Springfield	post location
Dick Kendall		338 (1889–1905)	Broughton	unknown
Thayer		339	Thayer	post location
Latham		340	Latham	post location
J. U. Parsons		341	Ogden	unknown
Argonia		342	Argonia	post location
Gardner		343	Udall	unknown
Saratoga		344 (1884–1889)	Saratoga	post location
Courtland		344 (1890–1930)	Courtland	post location
Col. D. C. Gamble		345 (1885–1889)	Cuba	David C. Gamble
Charles Culver		345 (1889–1907)	Cloverdale	Charles L. Culver
Louis L. Ury [sic]		346 (1884–1886)	Fort Scott	Lewis L. Ury
George V. Nokes		346 (1890–1900)	Cuba	George V. Nokes
William Castle		347 (1885–1887)	Skiddy	unknown
S. J. Willis		347 (1887–1902)	Skiddy	S. J. Willis
Chalk Mound		348	Chalk Mound	post location
A. C. Barlow		349 (1885–1888)	Fort Scott	unknown
B. F. Jenkins		349 (1890–1891)	Oxford	unknown
Nathaniel Lyon		350 (1884–1889)	Parsons	Nathaniel Lyon
Pipe Creek		350 (1891–1922)	Lamar	unknown
Elbert F. Peck		351	Hazelton	unknown
Tincher		352	Garden Plain	Samuel F. Tincher
Frontier		353	Spearville	Army of the Frontier
S. A. Gilbert		354	Mount Hope	unknown
Glenwood		355 (1885–1891)	Crawford	unknown
Gaylord		355 (1892–1928)	Gaylord	post location
McGovney		356	Clearwater	James P. McGovney
Bavaria		357 (1885–1888)	Bavaria	post location
Agra		357 (1889–1904)	Agra	post location
Mark D. Updegraff		358	Iuka	Mark D. Updegraff
Parson Brownlow		359	Wayne	William Gannaway Brownlow
Attica / Charles G. Harker		360	Attica	post location / Charles Garrison Harker
Glen Elder		361 (1885–1889)	Glen Elder	post location
T. W. Sweeney [sic]		361 (1889–1907)	Pawnee Rock	Thomas William Sweeny
Chapman		362	Champman	post location
Barnes		363	Barnes	post location
Lakin		364	Lakin	post location
G. W. Deitzler / Samuel Walker		365	Lawrence	George Deitzler / Samuel Walker
Capt. Hudson		366	Cimarron	Amos B. Hudson
Buffalo Park		367	Buffalo Park	post location
George B. McClellan		368	Morganville	George B. McClellan
Thomas James		369	Bittertown / Olpe	unknown
Richland		370	Richland	post location
Mission Ridge		371	De Soto	Battle of Missionary Ridge
Sun City		372 (1885–1888)	Sun City	post location
John M. Corse		372 (1893)	Dennis	John M. Corse
T. C. Corey		372 (1894–1895)	Dennis	unknown
Corporal W. C. Hagar		373 (1885–1888)	Protection	Wesley C. Hagar
John M. Corse		373 (1893–1899)	Lafontaine	John M. Corse
Solomon		374	Solomon	post location
Dan McCook		375 (1884–1889)	Annelly	Daniel McCook Jr.
W. C. Ward		375 (1889–1917)	Whitewater	unknown
Linwood		376	Linwood	post location
Potwin		377	Potwin	post location
John D. Wilson		378 (1886–1890)	Concordia	unknown
C. P. Taylor		378 (1891–1928)	Conway Springs	Chandler P. Taylor
Corporal John Payne		379 (1886–1890)	Lawrence	John S. Payne
Capt. G. D. Wallace		379 (1891–1910)	Lawrence / Sarcoxie	unknown
Thomas Brennan		380	Leavenworth (National Military Home)	Thomas Brennan
Syracuse		381	Syracuse	post location
Hancock		382	Colwich	Winfield Scott Hancock
Reed		383	Manchester / Vine Creek	unknown
Barricklow		384	Kiowa	George R. Barricklow
Capt. Hogan / Germantown		385	Germantown	unknown / post location
Conway Springs		386 (1886–1887)	Conway Springs	post location
Sylvia		386 (1887–1916)	Sylvia	post location
Louis Hamilton		387	Kendall	unknown
Meade Center		388	Meade Center	post location
Webster		389	Webster	post location
A. J. Pickering		390 (1886–1890)	Cambridge	unknown
Cambridge		390 (1891)	Cambridge	post location
Crawford		391 (1886)	Windom	Samuel J. Crawford
J. J. Baldwin		391 (1887–1894)	Cairo	unknown
Crisfield		392 (1886–1890)	Crisfield	post location
Major Collins		392 (1890–1895)	Stark	unknown
Norwich		393 (1889)	Norwich	post location
John C. Fremont		393 (1888–1897)	Nonchalanta	John C. Frémont
Old Flag		394	Fowler	patriotic reference
Hope		395	Hope	post location
Fargo Springs		396 (1887–1889)	Fargo Springs	post location
Enterprise		396 (1893–1895)	Enterprise	post location
O. P. Morton		397	Beaumont / Keighley	Oliver P. Morton
Scott		398	Coldwater	Winfield Scott
John F. Miller		399	Leoti	unknown
Almena		400	Almena	post location
Neosho Rapids		401 (1886)	Neosho Rapids	post location
John A. Savage		401 (1889–1900)	Lewis	unknown
Albert B. Page		402 (1886–1889)	Ravanna	unknown
Martin E. Bacon		402 (1890–1901)	Fact	Martin E. Bacon
Fremont		403	Turon	John C. Frémont
Richfield		404	Richfield	post location
Oakley		405	Oakley	post location
Woodston		406	Woodston	post location
South Haven		407	South Haven	post location
Perth		408	Perth	post location
H. W. Beck		409	Benton	unknown
Angel		410 (1886–1888)	Scott City	unknown
Seth Kelley		410 (1889–1907)	Vinland	Seth Kelley
Chester A. Arthur		411	Goff	Chester A. Arthur
Wano / Sam Weber		412	Wano	post location / unknown
Norcatur		413	Norcatur	post location
Capt. Jackson Morrow		414 (1887–1890)	Monument	Jackson Morrow
Inman		414 (1890–1908)	Inman	post location
Dighton		415	Dighton	post location
Dick Curry		416	Oronoque	unknown
Violenta		417 (1887–1890)	Violenta	post location
Selden		417 (1890–1928)	Selden	post location
Harveyville		418	Harveyville	post location
Col. Putnam		419	Haddam	unknown
Hartland		420 (1887–1890)	Hartland	post location
J. A. Anderson		420 (1892–1909)	Louisville	unknown
S. S. Perry		421 (1887–1889)	Wallace	unknown
Savonburg		421 (1892–1900)	Savonburg	post location
Lewis Christie		422	Beverly	Lewis Christie
Santa Fe		423	Santa Fe	post location
Marshall / Herington		424	Herington	unknown / post location
T. J. Harrison		425	Belmont	unknown
Corbin		426 (1887–1889)	Corbin	post location
J. M. Gaston		426 (1890–1906)	Kimball	James M. Gaston
Joseph H. McWilliams		427 (1887–1889)	Nescatunga	unknown
J. D. Austin		427 (1892–1905)	Riley	unknown
W. S. Robertson		428	Eustis / Goodland	unknown
G. J. Stannard		429	Wakefield	unknown
Cullison		430	Cullison	post location
Beecher		431	Allison / Jennings	Henry Ward Beecher
B. H. Porter		432	Macksville	unknown
Charles A. Nichols		433	Gove	unknown
Bear Valley		434	Shockey	unknown
Haven		435	Haven	post location
Grainfield		436 (1887–1888)	Grainfield	post location
J. D. Bain		436 (1890–1900)	Hoisington	unknown
Major Elliott		437	Ashland	unknown
Tribune / R. Q. Thompson		438	Tribune	post location / Robert Q. Thompson
Major Rankin		439	Kincaid	unknown
Industry		440	Industry	post location
Kalvesta		441 (1887–1889)	Kalvesta	post location
Liberty		441 (1890–1921)	Liberty	post location
Hugo		442 (1888–1890)	Hugoton	post location
P. A. Hackleman		442 (1890–1894)	Rago	Pleasant A. Hackleman
Walton		443	Walton	post location
E. W. Barnum / Gen. A. H. Terry		444	Riverside / Hodgeman	unknown / Alfred Terry
Havana		445	Havana	post location
Bird City		446	Bird City	post location
O. B. Gardner		447	Gardner	Ozem B. Gardner
Rush		448	McCracken	Alexander Rush
Woodsdale		449	Woodsdale	post location
Bernard		450 (1887–1891)	Sharon	Blan P. Bernard
Gen. Lane		450 (1892–1901)	Clinton	James H. Lane
Foraker / Bacon		451	Bluff City	Joseph B. Foraker / Daniel Bacon
Luddell		452	Luddell	post location
Black Eagle		453	Black Eagle	post location
Gen. McNeal [sic]		454	Homewood	John McNeil
McDonald		455	Strong City	unknown
Wyandotte		456 (1887–1890)	Kansas City	post location
Henry Fuller		456 (1892–1901)	Narka	Henry Cowgill Fuller
W. R. Anderson		457	Tescott	unknown
Knoxville		458	Edna	Knoxville Campaign
J. B. Ricketts		459 (1887–1890)	Kanopolis	James B. Ricketts
Blackburn		459 (1892–1918)	Randall	unknown
Nelson Warren		460	Danville	Nelson L. Warren
Caldwell		461 (1888–1890)	Jackson / Preston	John C. Caldwell
W. H. Gibson		461 (1891–1916)	Leeds	William Harrison Gibson
Lucas		462	Lucas	post location
Capt. Kingscott		463	Argentine	John Walford Kingscott
W. S. Hancock		464	Emporia	Winfield Scott Hancock
J. B. Steadman [sic]		465	Gypsum	James B. Steedman
Bucklin		466	Bucklin	post location
John P. Bugh		467	Nashville	John P. Bugh
Robinson		468	Robinson	post location
Farmer City / Col. Ansel Tupper		469 (1888–1890)	Farmer City / Coronado	post location / Ansel Tupper
Palco		469 (1892–1924)	Palco	post location
Geneseo		470 (1888–1891)	Geneseo	post location
Esbon		470 (1892–1904)	Esbon	post location
Hill City		471 (1888–1889)	Hill City	post location
J. W. Vance		471 (1890–1897)	Wellsford	unknown
Arcadia		472	Arcadia	post location
Sharon Springs		473 (1888–1889)	Sharon Springs	post location
B. F. Butler		473 (1893–1906)	Sharon Springs	Benjamin F. Butler
Dahlgren		474 (1883–1885; 1890–1918)	Rush Center	John A. Dahlgren
George D. Waggoner		474 (1888–1889)	Armourdale	unknown
Arney		475	Colokan / Astor / Horace	unknown
Geuda Springs		476	Geuda Springs	post location
Oketo		477 (1888–1889)	Oketo	post location
Birney		477 (1892–1933)	Caney	David B. Birney
Motor		478	Codell	unknown
Sidney A. Bean / Banner		479	Banner	unknown / post location
Robert Houston		480	Morehead	Robert L. Houston
LeCompton		481	Lecompton	post location
Col. Milligan		482 (1888–1889)	Bassettville	unknown
Bronson		482 (1892–1922)	Bronson	post location
Clem Chivington		483	Goddard	Clement Chivington
E. E. Kimball		484	Rexford	unknown
Osterhaus		485	Prescott	Peter Joseph Osterhaus
Albert Carter		486 (1889)	Norman	unknown
Norwich		486 (1892–1893)	Norwich	post location
Sgt. Richard Steele		486 (1893–1925)	Fort Scott	unknown
Tom May		487	Mapleton	unknown
Hamilton		488	Hamilton	post location
Tyler		489	Shaw	unknown
Buell		490	Cedar Vale	Don Carlos Buell
Thomas Haughey		491	Hillsdale	unknown
Hiattville		492	Hiattville	post location
A. S. Everest		493	Atchison	unknown
Coats		494	Coats	post location
G. G. Gage		495	Topeka	Guilford G. Gage
Pomona		496	Pomona	post location
Fulton		497	Fulton	post location
Peru		498	Peru	post location
Havana		499	Havana	post location
Gen. U. B. Pearsall		500	Leavenworth National Military Home	Uri Balcom Pearsall

== Abbreviations used ==
- MG = Major General
- BG = Brigadier General
- Col = Colonel
- Ltc = Lieutenant Colonel
- Maj = Major
- Cpt = Captain
- Lt = 1st Lieutenant
- 2Lt = 2nd Lieutenant
- Sgt = Sergeant
- Cpl = Corporal
- Pvt = Private

== See also ==
- National Register of Historic Places listings in Kansas
- List of National Historic Landmarks in Kansas
