= National Register of Historic Places listings in Washington County, Kansas =

Location of Washington County in Kansas

This is a list of the National Register of Historic Places listings in Washington County, Kansas. It is intended to be a complete list of the properties and districts on the National Register of Historic Places in Washington County, Kansas, United States. The locations of National Register properties and districts for which the latitude and longitude coordinates are included below, may be seen in an online map.

There are 8 properties and districts listed on the National Register in the county.

This National Park Service list is complete through NPS recent listings posted March 21, 2025.

== Current listings ==
	Name on the Register	Image	Date listed	Location	City or town	Description
1	Hollenberg Pony Express Station	Hollenberg Pony Express Station	October 15, 1966 (#66000352)	1.5 miles east of Hanover; 39°54′03″N 96°50′37″W	Hanover	
2	Lowe Center School--District 115	Lowe Center School--District 115	April 7, 2014 (#14000119)	SW. corner Indian & 27th Rds. 39°57′31″N 97°12′04″W	Morrowville	
3	Mahaska Rural High School #3	Mahaska Rural High School #3	June 27, 2007 (#07000604)	S. School St. 39°59′07″N 97°21′06″W	Mahaska	
4	Site No. JF00-072	Site No. JF00-072	June 19, 1987 (#87001000)	Junction of Thayer, Jefferson, Washington, and Republic County lines 40°00′07″N 97°22′09″W	Mahaska	
5	Washington County Courthouse	Washington County Courthouse	April 6, 2000 (#00000328)	214 C St. 39°49′05″N 97°03′02″W	Washington	
6	Washington County Jail and Sheriff's Residence	Washington County Jail and Sheriff's Residence	July 19, 1996 (#96000762)	23 Commercial St. 39°49′12″N 97°03′05″W	Washington	
7	Washington County Kingpost	Washington County Kingpost	January 4, 1990 (#89002184)	39°42′40″N 96°52′25″W	Barnes	
8	John F. Wayland House	John F. Wayland House	May 1, 2013 (#13000222)	317 E. 6th St. 39°48′50″N 97°02′41″W	Washington	

== See also ==
- List of National Historic Landmarks in Kansas
- National Register of Historic Places listings in Kansas
