= Hollenberg =

Hollenberg is a name that refers to:

== Locations ==
- Hollenberg, Kansas, a city in the U.S.
- Hollenberg, a hamlet in the Netherlands

== People ==
- George Jacob Hollenberg (1897–1988), phycologist with the standard author abbreviation Hollenb.
- Yael Hollenberg (born 1969), French author
