= Lanham, Kansas and Nebraska =

Unincorporated community in Kansas and Nebraska, US

- Unincorporated community
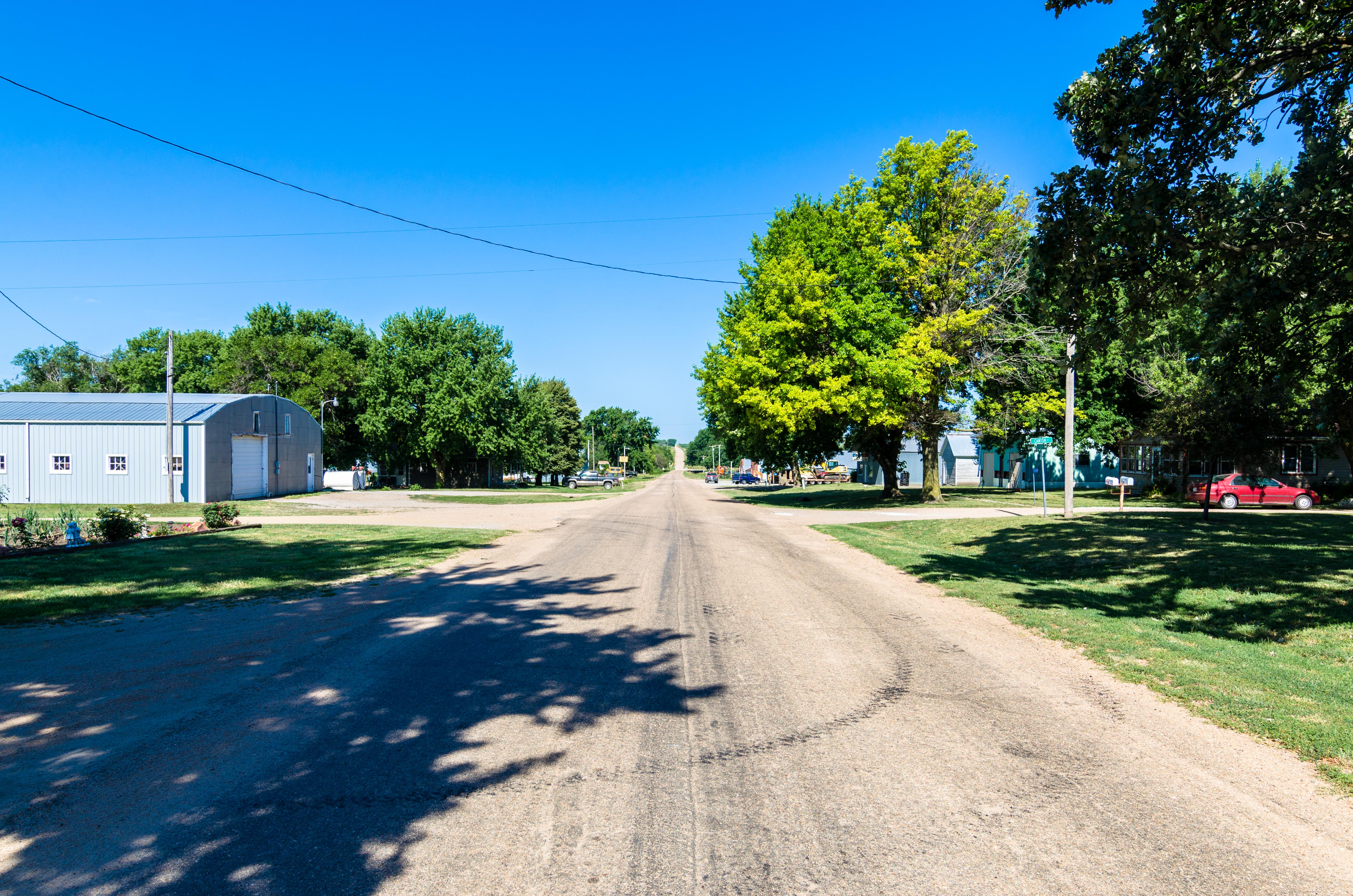
- West State Line Road in Lanham. Left side is Kansas, right side is Nebraska (2017).

- Location within Kansas Location within the United States
- Coordinates: 40°0′10″N 96°52′26″W
- Country: United States
- State: Kansas, Nebraska
- County KS NE: Washington, Kansas, Gage, Nebraska
- Elevation: 1,398 ft (426 m)
- Time zone: UTC-6 (CST)
  - Summer (DST): UTC-5 (CDT)
- ZIP Code: 66945, 68415
- FIPS code: 31-38625
- GNIS ID: 485447

Lanham is an unincorporated community in both Washington County, Kansas, and Gage County, Nebraska, United States. The Kansas–Nebraska state line runs down its main street. It is located along State Line Road, approximately 0.6 mile west of Kansas Highway K-148 / Nebraska Highway 112. It is seven miles north of Hanover, Kansas, and 6.5 miles from Odell, Nebraska.

== History ==
Lanham was named for a railroad official. A post office was opened in Lanham (on the Kansas side) in 1914, and remained in operation until 1923.

== Education ==
The Kansas side of the border and nearby rural areas are served by Barnes–Hanover–Linn USD 223 public school district.
