= Lambert Eidson =

American educator, college football coach (1880–1916)

Biographical details
- Born: July 2, 1880; Palmer, Kansas, U.S.
- Died: February 25, 1916 (aged 35); Holland, Michigan, U.S.

Coaching career (HC unless noted)
- 1912–1913: Hope

Head coaching record
- Overall: 3–8

Lambert Eidson (July 2, 1880 – February 25, 1916) was an American educator and college football coach. He served as the head football coach at Hope College in Holland, Michigan in 1912 and 1913.

Born in Palmer, Kansas, Eidson graduated from the College of Emporia in Emporia, Kansas, and later studied at the University of Kansas. He served as a high school principal and later superintendent of schools in Osage City, Kansas. He subsequently received a Ph.D. from the University of Chicago in June 1912.

In August 1912, Eidson moved from Chicago to Holland, Michigan, and became the chair of the education department at Hope College. He also served as the Hope football team in 1912 and 1913. He resigned from his post at Hope in 1914 to accepted a position with a insurance agency in Grand Rapids, Michigan.

Eidson was married to Irene Youman in 1908. In February 1916, Eidson underwent surgery for appendicitis at his home in Holland, Michigan. Eidson died at home, days after the surgery, on February 25, at age 35.

== Head coaching record ==
=== College football ===
Year	Team	Overall	Conference	Standing	Bowl/playoffs
Hope Flying Dutchmen (Independent) (1912–1913)
1912	Hope	0–5			
1913	Hope	3–3			
Hope:		3–8			
Total:		3–8			
