= Washington County, Kansas =

County in Kansas, United States

- County
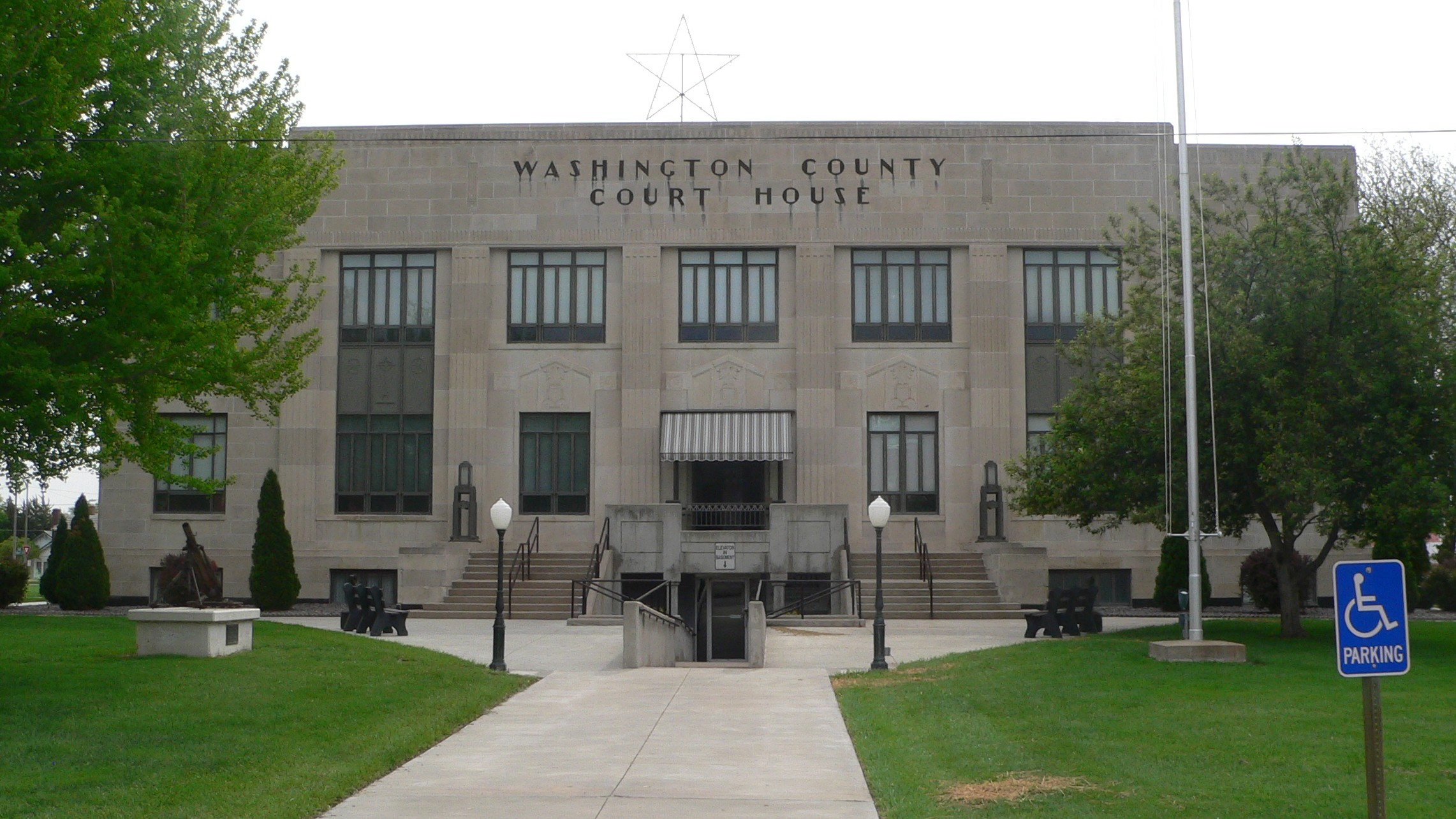
- Washington County Courthouse in Washington (2015)

- Location within the U.S. state of Kansas
- Coordinates: 39°48′N 97°06′W
- Country: United States
- State: Kansas
- Founded: February 20, 1857
- Named for: George Washington
- Seat: Washington
- Largest city: Washington

Area
  - Total: 899 sq mi (2,330 km^{2})
  - Land: 895 sq mi (2,320 km^{2})
  - Water: 3.9 sq mi (10 km^{2}) 0.4%

Population (2020)
  - Total: 5,530
  - Estimate (2025): 5,533 ▲
  - Density: 6.18/sq mi (2.39/km^{2})
- Time zone: UTC−6 (Central)
  - Summer (DST): UTC−5 (CDT)
- Area code: 785
- Congressional district: 1st
- Website: WashingtonCountyKS.gov

Washington County is a county located in the U.S. state of Kansas. Its county seat and largest city is Washington. As of the 2020 census, the county population was 5,530. The county was named for George Washington, the 1st president of the United States.

== History ==
=== Early history ===
For millennia, the Great Plains of North America was inhabited by nomadic Native Americans. Numerous tribes lived on the Great Plains including the: Arapaho, Cheyenne, Comanche, Sioux, Ute, Otoe, Kansa, Kiowa, Osage, Omaha, Ponca, Pawnee, and Wichita. These tribes were sustained by a seemingly inexhaustible supply of buffalo that then numbered in the tens of millions.

From the 16th century to 18th century, the Kingdom of France claimed ownership of large parts of North America. In 1762, after the French and Indian War, France secretly ceded New France to Spain, per the Treaty of Fontainebleau.

=== 19th century ===
In 1802, Spain returned most of the land to France, but keeping title to about 7,500 square miles. In 1803, most of the land for modern day Kansas was acquired by the United States from France as part of the 828,000 square mile Louisiana Purchase for 2.83 cents per acre.

In 1854, the Kansas Territory was organized, then in 1861 Kansas became the 34th U.S. state. In 1857, Washington County was established. The Oregon-California Trail, the Overland Stage Line, and the Pony Express all ran through Washington County. The Hollenberg Way Station opened in 1857 and operated until 1872 in the northeastern corner of the county.

=== 21st century ===
In 2010, the Keystone-Cushing Pipeline (Phase II) was constructed north to south through Washington County, with much concern over tax exemption and environmental issues when a leak occurs. The pipeline was shut down on December 7, 2022, after a leak was detected near the community of Washington. It reopened on December 29, 2022.

== Geography ==
According to the U.S. Census Bureau, the county has a total area of 899 square miles (2,330 km^{2}), of which 895 square miles (2,320 km^{2}) is land and 3.9 square miles (10 km^{2}) (0.4%) is water.

=== Adjacent counties ===
- Jefferson County, Nebraska (north)
- Gage County, Nebraska (northeast)
- Marshall County (east)
- Riley County (southeast)
- Clay County (south)
- Cloud County (southwest)
- Republic County (west)
- Thayer County, Nebraska (northwest)

== Demographics ==
Historical population
Census	Pop.	Note	%±
1860	383		—
1870	4,081		965.5%
1880	14,910		265.4%
1890	22,894		53.5%
1900	21,963		−4.1%
1910	20,229		−7.9%
1920	17,984		−11.1%
1930	17,112		−4.8%
1940	15,921		−7.0%
1950	12,977		−18.5%
1960	10,739		−17.2%
1970	9,249		−13.9%
1980	8,543		−7.6%
1990	7,073		−17.2%
2000	6,483		−8.3%
2010	5,799		−10.6%
2020	5,530		−4.6%
2025 (est.)	5,533	▲	0.1%
U.S. Decennial Census; 1790-1960 1900-1990; 1990-2000 2010-2020

=== Racial and ethnic composition ===
Washington County, Kansas – Racial and ethnic composition Note: the US Census treats Hispanic/Latino as an ethnic category. This table excludes Latinos from the racial categories and assigns them to a separate category. Hispanics/Latinos may be of any race.
Race / Ethnicity (NH = Non-Hispanic)	Pop 1980	Pop 1990	Pop 2000	Pop 2010	Pop 2020	% 1980	% 1990	% 2000	% 2010	% 2020
White alone (NH)	8,492	7,040	6,380	5,558	5,084	99.40%	99.53%	98.41%	95.84%	91.93%
Black or African American alone (NH)	0	4	7	23	13	0.00%	0.06%	0.11%	0.40%	0.24%
Native American or Alaska Native alone (NH)	12	7	16	8	2	0.14%	0.10%	0.25%	0.14%	0.04%
Asian alone (NH)	7	0	3	19	4	0.08%	0.00%	0.05%	0.33%	0.07%
Native Hawaiian or Pacific Islander alone (NH)	x	x	0	0	2	x	x	0.00%	0.00%	0.04%
Other race alone (NH)	7	0	2	0	6	0.08%	0.00%	0.03%	0.00%	0.11%
Mixed race or Multiracial (NH)	x	x	33	47	144	x	x	0.51%	0.81%	2.60%
Hispanic or Latino (any race)	25	22	42	144	275	0.29%	0.31%	0.65%	2.48%	4.97%
Total	8,543	7,073	6,483	5,799	5,530	100.00%	100.00%	100.00%	100.00%	100.00%

=== 2020 census ===
As of the 2020 census, the county had a population of 5,530. The median age was 43.8 years. 23.5% of residents were under the age of 18 and 23.5% of residents were 65 years of age or older. For every 100 females there were 106.0 males, and for every 100 females age 18 and over there were 104.2 males age 18 and over.

The racial makeup of the county was 93.2% White, 0.2% Black or African American, 0.1% American Indian and Alaska Native, 0.1% Asian, 0.0% Native Hawaiian and Pacific Islander, 2.0% from some other race, and 4.4% from two or more races. Hispanic or Latino residents of any race comprised 5.0% of the population.

0.0% of residents lived in urban areas, while 100.0% lived in rural areas.

There were 2,312 households in the county, of which 26.6% had children under the age of 18 living with them and 19.5% had a female householder with no spouse or partner present. About 31.5% of all households were made up of individuals and 16.4% had someone living alone who was 65 years of age or older.

There were 2,726 housing units, of which 15.2% were vacant. Among occupied housing units, 79.6% were owner-occupied and 20.4% were renter-occupied. The homeowner vacancy rate was 1.3% and the rental vacancy rate was 12.7%.

=== 2000 census ===
As of the census of 2000, there were 6,483 people, 2,673 households, and 1,780 families residing in the county. The population density was 7 people per square mile (2.7 people/km^{2}). There were 3,142 housing units at an average density of 4 per square mile (1.5/km^{2}). The racial makeup of the county was 98.90% White, 0.11% Black or African American, 0.34% Native American, 0.05% Asian, 0.09% from other races, and 0.51% from two or more races. 0.65% of the population were Hispanic or Latino of any race.

There were 2,673 households, out of which 26.60% had children under the age of 18 living with them, 59.40% were married couples living together, 4.20% had a female householder with no husband present, and 33.40% were non-families. 31.20% of all households were made up of individuals, and 17.80% had someone living alone who was 65 years of age or older. The average household size was 2.35 and the average family size was 2.96.

In the county, the population was spread out, with 23.70% under the age of 18, 5.40% from 18 to 24, 22.90% from 25 to 44, 23.00% from 45 to 64, and 25.10% who were 65 years of age or older. The median age was 44 years. For every 100 females there were 100.80 males. For every 100 females age 18 and over, there were 97.80 males.

The median income for a household in the county was $29,363, and the median income for a family was $37,260. Males had a median income of $25,074 versus $18,000 for females. The per capita income for the county was $15,515. About 7.30% of families and 10.10% of the population were below the poverty line, including 12.20% of those under age 18 and 12.40% of those age 65 or over.

== Government ==
=== Presidential elections ===
Presidential election results

United States presidential election results for Washington County, Kansas
Year	Republican		Democratic		Third party(ies)	
Year	No.	%	No.	%	No.	%
1888	2,999	62.28%	1,511	31.38%	305	6.33%
1892	2,323	44.80%	0	0.00%	2,862	55.20%
1896	2,514	50.67%	2,391	48.19%	57	1.15%
1900	2,960	56.02%	2,252	42.62%	72	1.36%
1904	3,066	68.13%	1,259	27.98%	175	3.89%
1908	2,711	57.51%	1,904	40.39%	99	2.10%
1912	1,326	28.41%	1,914	41.01%	1,427	30.58%
1916	3,766	51.72%	3,316	45.54%	200	2.75%
1920	4,390	76.06%	1,287	22.30%	95	1.65%
1924	4,120	60.98%	1,528	22.62%	1,108	16.40%
1928	4,781	67.37%	2,267	31.94%	49	0.69%
1932	3,324	43.43%	4,234	55.32%	95	1.24%
1936	4,809	58.70%	3,355	40.95%	28	0.34%
1940	5,792	73.29%	2,061	26.08%	50	0.63%
1944	5,040	77.11%	1,455	22.26%	41	0.63%
1948	3,894	66.19%	1,894	32.19%	95	1.61%
1952	5,135	81.39%	1,148	18.20%	26	0.41%
1956	4,220	74.81%	1,389	24.62%	32	0.57%
1960	3,707	68.09%	1,706	31.34%	31	0.57%
1964	2,654	56.41%	2,015	42.83%	36	0.77%
1968	3,177	68.29%	1,131	24.31%	344	7.39%
1972	3,301	75.13%	996	22.67%	97	2.21%
1976	2,543	60.36%	1,564	37.12%	106	2.52%
1980	3,058	74.90%	784	19.20%	241	5.90%
1984	2,979	75.69%	889	22.59%	68	1.73%
1988	2,269	67.13%	1,063	31.45%	48	1.42%
1992	1,740	47.00%	893	24.12%	1,069	28.88%
1996	2,397	67.39%	804	22.60%	356	10.01%
2000	2,446	74.87%	687	21.03%	134	4.10%
2004	2,498	78.31%	643	20.16%	49	1.54%
2008	2,248	75.44%	659	22.11%	73	2.45%
2012	2,316	80.17%	524	18.14%	49	1.70%
2016	2,194	79.35%	387	14.00%	184	6.65%
2020	2,363	81.96%	475	16.48%	45	1.56%
2024	2,263	83.81%	396	14.67%	41	1.52%

Washington County is overwhelmingly Republican. No Democratic presidential candidate has won Washington County since Franklin D. Roosevelt in 1932, and Roosevelt remains the solitary Democrat to ever win a majority in the county. Since 1940, only Lyndon Johnson in 1964 has earned forty percent of Washington County's vote as the Democratic Party candidate.

=== Laws ===
Washington County was a prohibition, or "dry", county until the Kansas Constitution was amended in 1986 and voters approved the sale of alcoholic liquor by the individual drink with a 30 percent food sales requirement.

== Education ==
The county is served by:

- Washington County USD 108
- Barnes–Hanover–Linn USD 223

School district office in neighboring county

- Clifton–Clyde USD 224

== Communities ==
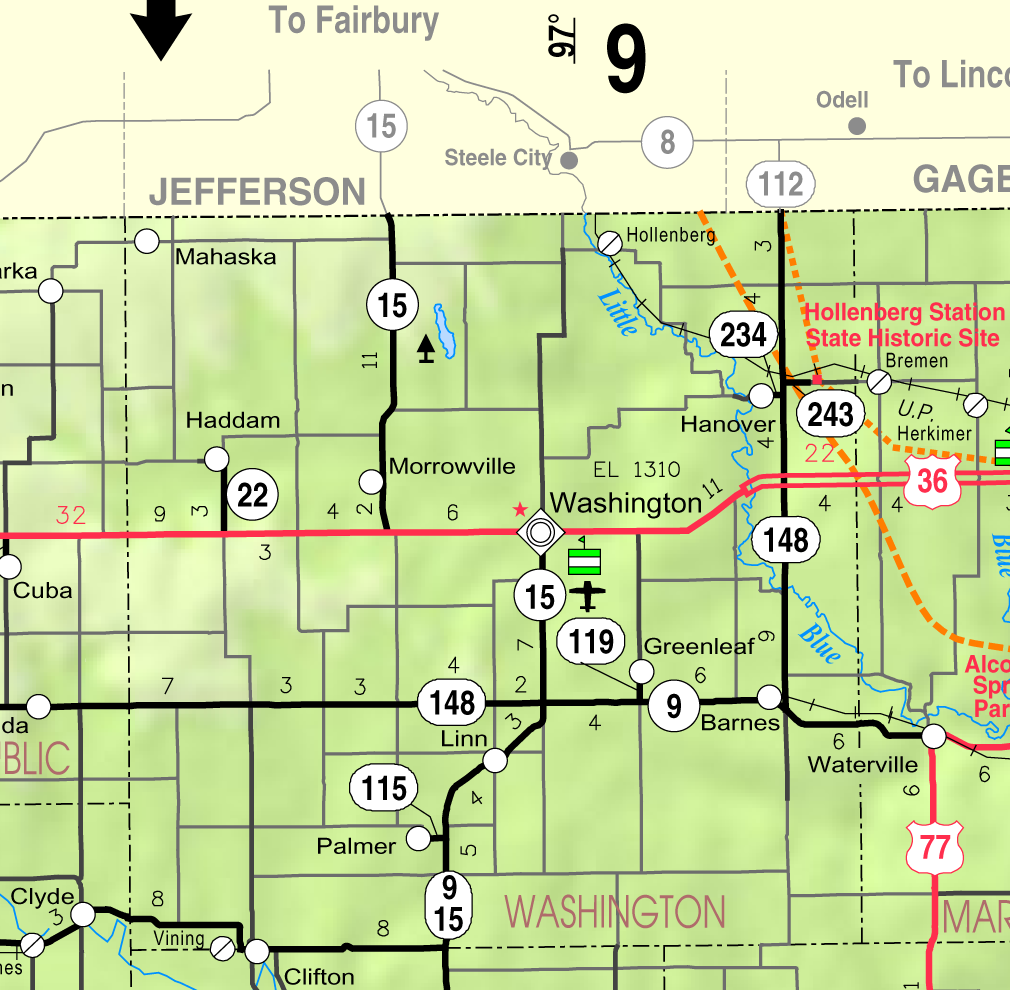
2005 map of Washington County (map legend)

List of townships / incorporated cities / unincorporated communities / extinct former communities within Washington County.

=== Cities ===
‡ means a community has portions in an adjacent county.

- Barnes
- Clifton‡
- Greenleaf
- Haddam
- Hanover
- Hollenberg
- Linn
- Mahaska
- Morrowville
- Palmer
- Vining‡
- Washington (county seat)

=== Unincorporated communities ===
- Lanham‡

=== Ghost towns ===
- Strawberry

=== Townships ===
Washington County is divided into twenty-five townships. The city of Washington is considered governmentally independent and is excluded from the census figures for the townships. In the following table, the population center is the largest city (or cities) included in that township's population total, if it is of a significant size.

Sources: 2000 U.S. Gazetteer from the U.S. Census Bureau.
Township	FIPS	Population center	Population	Population density /km^{2} (/sq mi)	Land area km^{2} (sq mi)	Water area km^{2} (sq mi)	Water %	Geographic coordinates
Barnes	04275		233	3 (6)	93 (36)	0 (0)	0%	39°41′59″N 96°51′41″W
Brantford	08250		91	1 (3)	93 (36)	0 (0)	0%	39°42′0″N 97°19′19″W
Charleston	12625		99	1 (3)	93 (36)	0 (0)	0.03%	39°52′36″N 96°58′54″W
Clifton	14225		459	5 (13)	94 (36)	0 (0)	0%	39°35′19″N 97°18′11″W
Coleman	14750		64	1 (2)	94 (36)	0 (0)	0%	39°46′39″N 97°11′24″W
Farmington	23275		192	2 (5)	94 (36)	0 (0)	0%	39°51′52″N 97°6′1″W
Franklin	24525		139	2 (4)	92 (36)	0 (0)	0.24%	39°57′33″N 96°59′20″W
Grant	28175		25	0 (1)	93 (36)	0 (0)	0%	39°46′24″N 97°19′21″W
Greenleaf	28650		450	5 (13)	93 (36)	0 (0)	0%	39°42′33″N 96°59′5″W
Haddam	29425		246	3 (7)	93 (36)	0 (0)	0%	39°51′51″N 97°18′28″W
Hanover	29900		884	9 (25)	93 (36)	0 (0)	0.05%	39°52′54″N 96°52′10″W
Highland	32025		22	0 (1)	92 (36)	0 (0)	0.45%	39°57′16″N 97°5′30″W
Independence	33950		169	2 (5)	93 (36)	0 (0)	0.03%	39°57′28″N 96°51′50″W
Kimeo	36850		75	1 (2)	93 (36)	0 (0)	0%	39°36′11″N 96°57′57″W
Lincoln	41250		84	1 (2)	93 (36)	0 (0)	0%	39°37′2″N 96°51′12″W
Linn	41450		599	6 (17)	93 (36)	0 (0)	0.03%	39°41′5″N 97°5′16″W
Little Blue	41500		93	1 (3)	93 (36)	0 (0)	0.09%	39°46′38″N 96°51′59″W
Logan	42300		109	1 (3)	92 (36)	0 (0)	0.05%	39°47′11″N 96°57′56″W
Lowe	43025		76	1 (2)	92 (36)	0 (0)	0%	39°57′29″N 97°12′5″W
Mill Creek	46750		274	3 (8)	94 (36)	0 (0)	0%	39°52′4″N 97°11′20″W
Sheridan	64775		119	1 (3)	93 (36)	0 (0)	0%	39°37′3″N 97°11′19″W
Sherman	65125		249	3 (7)	93 (36)	0 (0)	0%	39°37′2″N 97°6′3″W
Strawberry	68550		130	1 (4)	94 (36)	0 (0)	0%	39°41′32″N 97°12′30″W
Union	72475		161	2 (5)	92 (36)	0 (0)	0.04%	39°57′58″N 97°19′30″W
Washington	75850		218	2 (6)	91 (35)	0 (0)	0.04%	39°47′12″N 97°4′38″W

== See also ==
- National Register of Historic Places listings in Washington County, Kansas
