= 2022 Keystone Pipeline oil spill =

Pipeline leak near Washington County, Kansas

Keystone Pipeline oil spill
- Interactive map of Keystone Pipeline oil spill
- Location: Washington County, Kansas, United States
- Coordinates: 39.8422617°N 96.9965473°W
- Date: December 7, 2022

Cause
- Cause: A faulty weld along with bending stress in the junction
- Operator: TC Energy

Spill characteristics
- Volume: 588,000 U.S. gallons (14,000 barrels)

The Keystone Pipeline oil spill occurred on December 7, 2022, when a leak in the Keystone Pipeline released 13,000 barrels of oil into a creek in Washington County, Kansas. The leak is the largest in the United States since the 2013 North Dakota pipeline spill and the largest in the history of the Keystone Pipeline.

== Background ==
The Keystone Pipeline System is a 2,687 mile long North American transport route for bitumen and synthetic crude oil from Alberta, Canada to multiple locations through Canada and the United States, going as far south as Nederland, Texas. The steel pipeline is composed primarily of 36 inch in diameter (914mm) welded and fitted pipes and is designed to handle up to approximately 830,000 barrels (39.4 million gallons) of oil per day. One key distinction with this pipeline is the type of oil it was transporting; Canadian tar sands oil, also known as bitumen, is uniquely heavy and toxic when compared to lighter crude oils, and therefore requires higher levels of pressure containment from the pipes to prevent leaks and ruptures. The construction and maintenance of the system is managed by TC Energy, one of the leading suppliers of natural gas in North America. From 2010 to 2022 the pipeline transported between 550,000 - 650,000 barrels of oil a day (23 - 27 millions gallons). The Keystone Pipeline has undergone planned expansions since the initial construction, with the most recent proposed expansion being the Keystone XL pipeline, which was revoked by US President Joe Biden's administration in 2021. The Keystone XL proposition was mired in controversy due to the political climate of the 2010s in the United States. President Barack Obama formally rejected the initial proposition for the Keystone XL expansion in November 2015, claiming that the expansion would undercut the United States' commitment to curbing climate change and could have permanent impacts to the protected area of the Sandhills in Nebraska.This formal rejection was then subverted by President Donald Trump in 2019 who cited the potential for American oil independence. The Biden administration's decision to revoke the expansion that was approved during the previous administration, under President Trump, connects to a broader discussion of how the pipeline was seen by some as a potential threat to the sovereign lands of local Indigenous tribes as well as the environment if engineering controls failed.

== Post-construction: failures in assessment ==
The Cushing Extension to the pipeline was completed in 2010 and would eventually lead to the failure in the fitting that was cited as the direct cause of the 2022 pipeline rupture and spill. This extension is a roughly 298-mile section that runs from Steele City, Nebraska to Cushing, Oklahoma. Milepost 14 is where the failure and spill occurred. Investigations following the incident reference to a failure to respond to reports in the post-construction tests performed on the extension. Hydrostatic tests performed in 2010 led to identified visible coating damage to a fitting for the new Cushing Extension during a subsequent assessment. While this coating damage was reported at the time, the real cause of this damage was due to a larger, unmitigated issue: bulging stress from constant fatigue. Bulging stress in a pipeline of this size is expected, which is why hydrostatic testing is always necessary before approving a pipeline for commercial use, to ensure that the pipe and its structural elements can withstand the positive pressure of millions of gallons of oil. A failure report performed by TC Oil Pipelines Inc established that the bulging and bending stress were a result of constant fatigue at the girth weld, which is a significant failure in this case, as the pipeline was never used at more than its 72% specified limited yield strength. This implies that the weaknesses in the pipe, while documented, were not addressed directly through repairs or upkeep, and that the goal was to use it at a lower capacity to avoid exacerbating the known issues. Despite the dangers this practice presents, this is not uncommon; the primary goal of a stress test is to establish the limits of the design and to then establish ceilings, which is where the specified limited yield strength is calculated and confirmed.

== Detection and response ==
At 9:01 p.m. EDT on December 7, the first indication of a leak on the pipeline was signaled. At 9:08 p.m., TC Energy launched an emergency shutdown of the Keystone Pipeline, following a drop in pressure. The previously described section of the pipeline where the failure occurred was quickly isolated, and downstream flow was the second aspect of the spill to be addressed. Spill containment was focused on reducing the outflow of oil into Mill Creek, a creek that flows directly into the Little Blue River (Kansas/Nebraska).The following day, December 8th, downstream migration of oil was reported to be contained by the efforts of TC staff and assistance from government agencies like The Environmental Protection Agency. The EPA reported that TC Energy managed to achieve containment by building an earthen dam roughly 4 miles downstream from the rupture site to prevent oil from traveling to larger waterways. The leak was detected near Washington County, Kansas, and spilled into Mill Creek, An evacuation order was not given. TC Energy maintained that the rupture was controlled quickly and that the impact from the outflow of oil was reduced as much as possible, but these early updates proved to be downplaying the situation mildly, considering that the tar sands oil transported in this pipeline is more toxic than lighter crude oil and is denser, which means it can sink into water rather than float on top. This meant that the cleanup process would need to be exceptionally thorough; one environmentalist, Bill Caram, claimed that a spill involving tar sand oils can necessitate far measures like scrubbing the individual rocks in the Mill Creek bed. TC Energy entered into a unified command structure with the EPA, the Kansas Department of Health and Environment, and the Pipeline and Hazardous Materials Safety Association (PHMSA) to ensure that spill cleanup and repairs were handled to the necessary degree to prevent deeper environmental impacts.

== Environmental impact ==
Although transportation of oil via pipelines causes less accidents with regards to incidence each year than when compared to automotive transportation of oil, the magnitude of oil that originates from a pipeline spill is much greater, therefore resulting in longer clean up times and the potential for greater environmental harm. The 2022 Keystone Pipeline oil spill resulted in over five hundred thousand gallons of oil covering approximately an acre and a half of farmland, which rendered the farmland unusable following the incident. The oil from the pipeline spill presented both short-terms and long-term ecological consequences, with the short term being the destruction of crops leading to a decreased crop yield and ability of land owners to profit economically from that land, as well the death of approximately 4 mammal and 71 fish in the immediately affected area. With regards to long term implications, it's likely the affected farmland will never regain function given the immense toxicological implications of this spill, therefore placing further economic burdens on the farm owners as their crop yields will likely not return to their former magnitude. Additionally, given that the oil transported through the Keystone Pipeline is a heavier, more toxic rendition of traditional oil, there is a high likelihood that that the oil which entered into the nearby water supply was able to accumulate on the sediment surface, presenting potential for harmful exposure to the harmful toxicological impacts of the oil in the years to come. In response to this spill, TC Energy and the Environmental Protection Agency (EPA) constructed an earthen dam 4 miles downstream, despite the oil only traveling a quarter of a mile, to prevent further toxicological damages from being done. EPA and TC Energy also committed to around the clock air-monitoring and stated that no drinking water wells were impacted by the spill. These efforts also call into question the potential exposure of the 250 first responders to the harmful effects of the oil spill, highlighting further harmful potential impacts of the 2022 oil spill. Consideration of environmental hazards and the potential damages to property, water accesses, and human health, is therefore essential, especially in the event that expansion of the Keystone Pipeline occurs.

== Pipeline investigation ==
The Environmental Protection Agency dispatched two coordinators, who determined there was no impact to drinking water in the Washington County area. The Pipeline and Hazardous Materials Safety Administration began an investigation into the leak on December 9th. The PHMSA, along with the Department of Transportation, found several flaws in the Cushing extension that would lead to them shutting down the entire section in March 2023. The investigation continued after this shutdown to other parts of the pipeline, and would eventually lead to 1,000 miles of the pipeline being cited for corrective actions. Many critics of TC Energy's business practices cite the PHMSA investigation as further proof that the company ignored several warning signs of a potential rupture for years. The Keystone Pipeline has experienced 23 oil spills between 2010 and the 2025, which highlights how many warning signs this major source of crude oil had surrounding it.

== Cause of the spill ==
The independent analysis of the failure concluded that the failure occurred due to a combination of factors, including bending stress on the pipe and a weld flaw at a pipe to fitting girth weld that was completed at a fabrication facility.

== Economic impact ==
The price of crude oil rose 5% following the shutdown of the Keystone Pipeline, before receding. The surge occurred during a selloff of the price of oil, following the 2021–2022 global energy crisis. TC Energy declared a force majeure upon news of the leak. The spill, which leaked into a creek in Washington County, Kansas, cost about $480 million in clean-up efforts.
