= Mahaska, Kansas =

City in Washington County, Kansas

- City
- Location within Washington County and Kansas

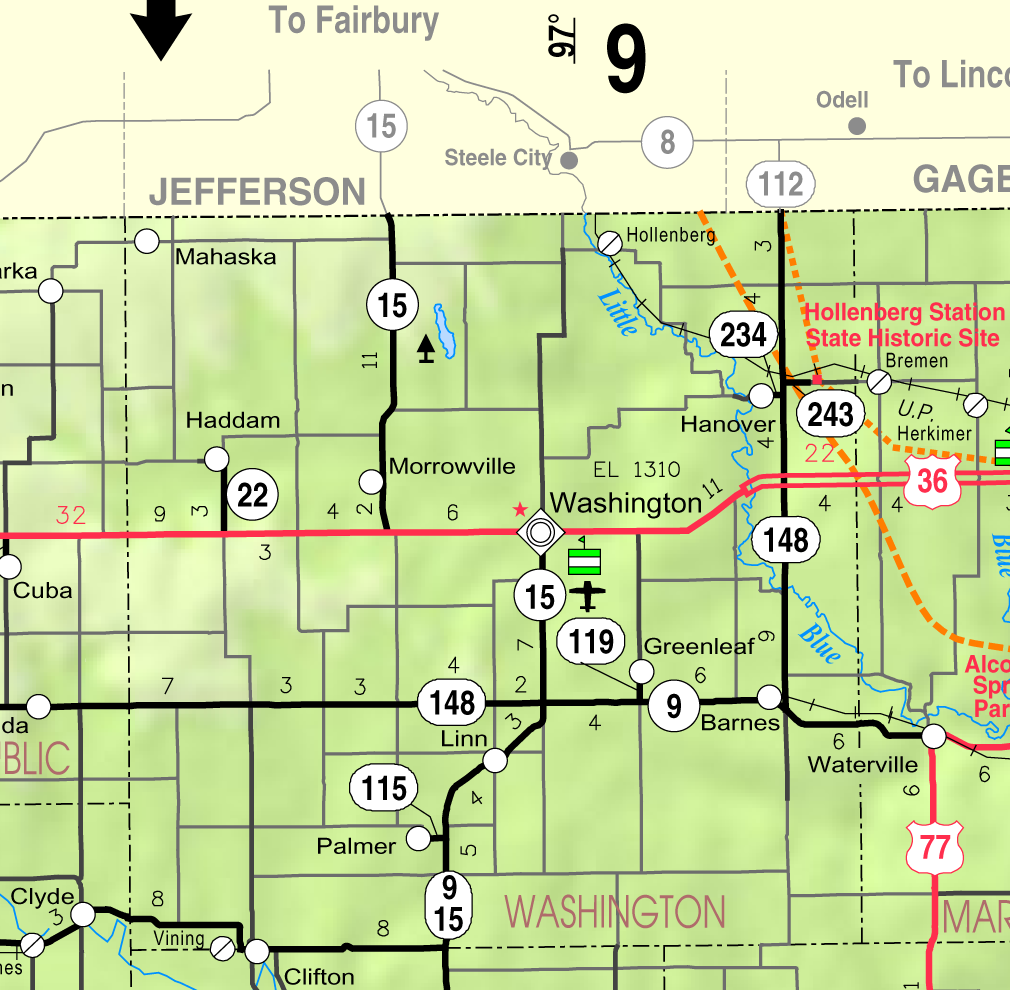
- KDOT map of Washington County (legend)
- Coordinates: 39°59′14″N 97°21′13″W
- Country: United States
- State: Kansas
- County: Washington
- Founded: 1887
- Incorporated: 1909
- Named for: Chief Mahaska

Area
  - Total: 0.22 sq mi (0.58 km^{2})
  - Land: 0.22 sq mi (0.58 km^{2})
  - Water: 0 sq mi (0.00 km^{2})
- Elevation: 1,601 ft (488 m)

Population (2020)
  - Total: 46
  - Density: 210/sq mi (79/km^{2})
- Time zone: UTC-6 (CST)
  - Summer (DST): UTC-5 (CDT)
- ZIP Code: 66955
- Area code: 785
- FIPS code: 20-44150
- GNIS ID: 2395816

Mahaska is a city in Washington County, Kansas, United States. As of the 2020 census, the population of the city was 46. It is located one mile south of the Nebraska state line.

== History ==
Mahaska was founded in 1887 by L. Bonham. It was likely named for Chief Mahaska.

The first post office in Mahaska was established in December 1887.

In 1854, the Sixth Principal Meridian or 40th Parallel, approximately 1 mile northwest of the present day Mahaska. Originally marked in 1856, this site was the beginning point for land surveys for all land in Kansas, Nebraska, three-fourths of Colorado, most of Wyoming, and part of South Dakota. The original marker was rediscovered in 1976, then a new monument was dedicated in 1987.

== Geography ==
According to the United States Census Bureau, the city has a total area of 0.25 square miles (0.65 km^{2}), all land. The community is approximately 1.0 mile (1.6 km) south of the Kansas-Nebraska state line.

== Demographics ==
Historical population
Census	Pop.	Note	%±
1910	246		—
1920	210		−14.6%
1930	218		3.8%
1940	195		−10.6%
1950	179		−8.2%
1960	160		−10.6%
1970	122		−23.7%
1980	119		−2.5%
1990	98		−17.6%
2000	107		9.2%
2010	83		−22.4%
2020	46		−44.6%
U.S. Decennial Census

=== 2020 census ===
The 2020 United States census counted 46 people, 22 households, and 14 families in Mahaska. The population density was 206.3 per square mile (79.6/km^{2}). There were 42 housing units at an average density of 188.3 per square mile (72.7/km^{2}). The racial makeup was 95.65% (44) white or European American (95.65% non-Hispanic white), 0.0% (0) black or African-American, 0.0% (0) Native American or Alaska Native, 0.0% (0) Asian, 0.0% (0) Pacific Islander or Native Hawaiian, 0.0% (0) from other races, and 4.35% (2) from two or more races. Hispanic or Latino of any race was 0.0% (0) of the population.

Of the 22 households, 9.1% had children under the age of 18; 63.6% were married couples living together; 13.6% had a female householder with no spouse or partner present. 27.3% of households consisted of individuals and 13.6% had someone living alone who was 65 years of age or older. The average household size was 1.6 and the average family size was 2.4.

0.0% of the population was under the age of 18, 8.7% from 18 to 24, 17.4% from 25 to 44, 47.8% from 45 to 64, and 26.1% who were 65 years of age or older. The median age was 55.0 years. For every 100 females, there were 84.0 males. For every 100 females ages 18 and older, there were 84.0 males.

The 2016–2020 5-year American Community Survey estimates show that the median household income was $29,261 (with a margin of error of +/- $15,013). Males had a median income of $41,458 (+/- $5,354) versus $31,875 (+/- $13,830) for females. The median income for those above 16 years old was $40,000 (+/- $9,418).

=== 2010 census ===
As of the census of 2010, there were 83 people, 30 households, and 23 families residing in the city. The population density was 332.0 inhabitants per square mile (128.2/km^{2}). There were 47 housing units at an average density of 188.0 per square mile (72.6/km^{2}). The racial makeup of the city was 97.6% White and 2.4% from two or more races.

There were 30 households, of which 43.3% had children under the age of 18 living with them, 66.7% were married couples living together, 10.0% had a female householder with no husband present, and 23.3% were non-families. 20.0% of all households were made up of individuals. The average household size was 2.77 and the average family size was 3.22.

The median age in the city was 37.5 years. 33.7% of residents were under the age of 18; 4.8% were between the ages of 18 and 24; 28.8% were from 25 to 44; 16.8% were from 45 to 64; and 15.7% were 65 years of age or older. The gender makeup of the city was 54.2% male and 45.8% female.

=== 2000 census ===
As of the census of 2000, there were 107 people, 39 households, and 31 families residing in the city. The population density was 430.8 inhabitants per square mile (166.3/km^{2}). There were 49 housing units at an average density of 197.3 per square mile (76.2/km^{2}). The racial makeup of the city was 93.46% White, 0.93% African American, 1.87% Native American, and 3.74% from two or more races.

There were 39 households, out of which 38.5% had children under the age of 18 living with them, 64.1% were married couples living together, 12.8% had a female householder with no husband present, and 20.5% were non-families. 17.9% of all households were made up of individuals, and 7.7% had someone living alone who was 65 years of age or older. The average household size was 2.74 and the average family size was 3.03.

In the city, the population was spread out, with 31.8% under the age of 18, 7.5% from 18 to 24, 26.2% from 25 to 44, 23.4% from 45 to 64, and 11.2% who were 65 years of age or older. The median age was 34 years. For every 100 females, there were 101.9 males. For every 100 females age 18 and over, there were 97.3 males.

The median income for a household in the city was $24,375, and the median income for a family was $26,250. Males had a median income of $20,000 versus $19,583 for females. The per capita income for the city was $13,162. There were 19.2% of families and 21.6% of the population living below the poverty line, including 30.4% of under eighteens and none of those over 64.

== Education ==
The community is served by Washington County USD 108 public school district, which formed in 2006 by the consolidation of North Central USD 221 and Washington USD 222. The Washington County High School mascot is Tigers.

Mahaska High School was closed through school unification. The Mahaska High School mascot was Mahaska Cardinals.

== Notable people ==
- Charles McAtee - former director of Kansas prison system

== See also ==
- National Register of Historic Places listings in Washington County, Kansas
