= Yael Hollenberg =

French educational author

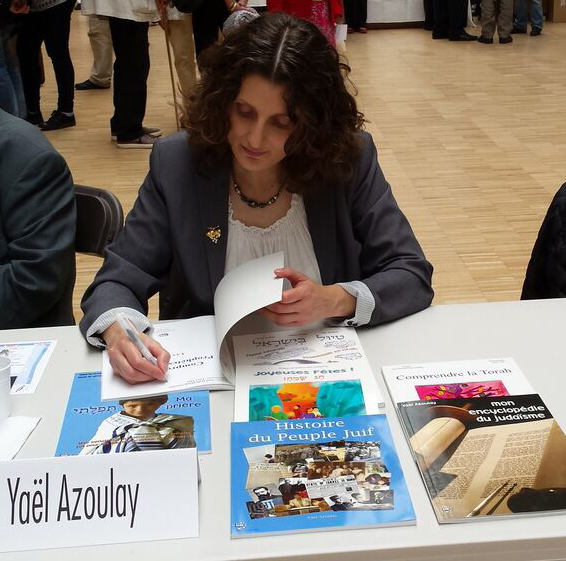
- Yael Hollenberg at the dedication of the Carreau du Temple in 2015
- Born: March 2, 1969 (age 56); Thiais
- Education: Université Paris Diderot
- Occupations: Writer, Teacher
- Board member of: Vice President of ANPEIP Île de France

Yael Hollenberg, born on March 2, 1969 (Age 56) in Thiais, is a French author of educational books.

== Biography ==
Yael Hollenberg studied at Paris Diderot University. She studied at an exchange program with Columbia University in New York from 1992 to 1994, where she was trained in Jewish liturgy at the Jewish Theological Seminary of America, where she worked as a librarian. During this time, she volunteered at the magazine Tikkun with Rabbi Michael Lerner. From 1995 to 1999, she worked at MJLF as a teacher. Since 2002, she has taught at Adath Shalom, particularly focusing on Bar-Mitsvah training. She also trained in singing in New York and at the conservatory of Saint-Mandé. She officiated for the High Holy Days in the Reform Jewish communities of Strasbourg and Grenoble, and then in Adath Shalom from 2004 on.

Yael Hollenberg is the author of several educational works on Jews and Judaism, used especially in Talmud and Torah schools. She is also the freelance author of multimedia resources for the company Tralalère, and is in this capacity the author of educational resources for their e-talmud site.

From 2009 to 2015, she presided over the ANPEIP Île de France. She is the mother of two children.

== Works ==
- Célébrons les Fêtes Juives, volumes 1 and 2, Biblieurope, 2004
- Tefilati, an introduction to prayer for children, Biblieurope, 2004
- Comprendre la Torah, Biblieurope, 2005
- Comprendre les Prophètes - Neviim, Biblieurope, 2006
- Tiyoul be-Israel, manuel d'hébreu, a collaboration with Shifra Svironi and Michal Svironi, Biblieurope, 2006
- Les Fêtes Juives, Biblieurope, 2008
- Joyeuses Fêtes !, Biblieurope, 2008
- Histoire du Peuple Juif, Biblieurope, 2009
- Mon encyclopédie du judaïsme, Biblieurope, 2015
