= Linn, Kansas =

City in Washington County, Kansas

- City
- Location within Washington County and Kansas

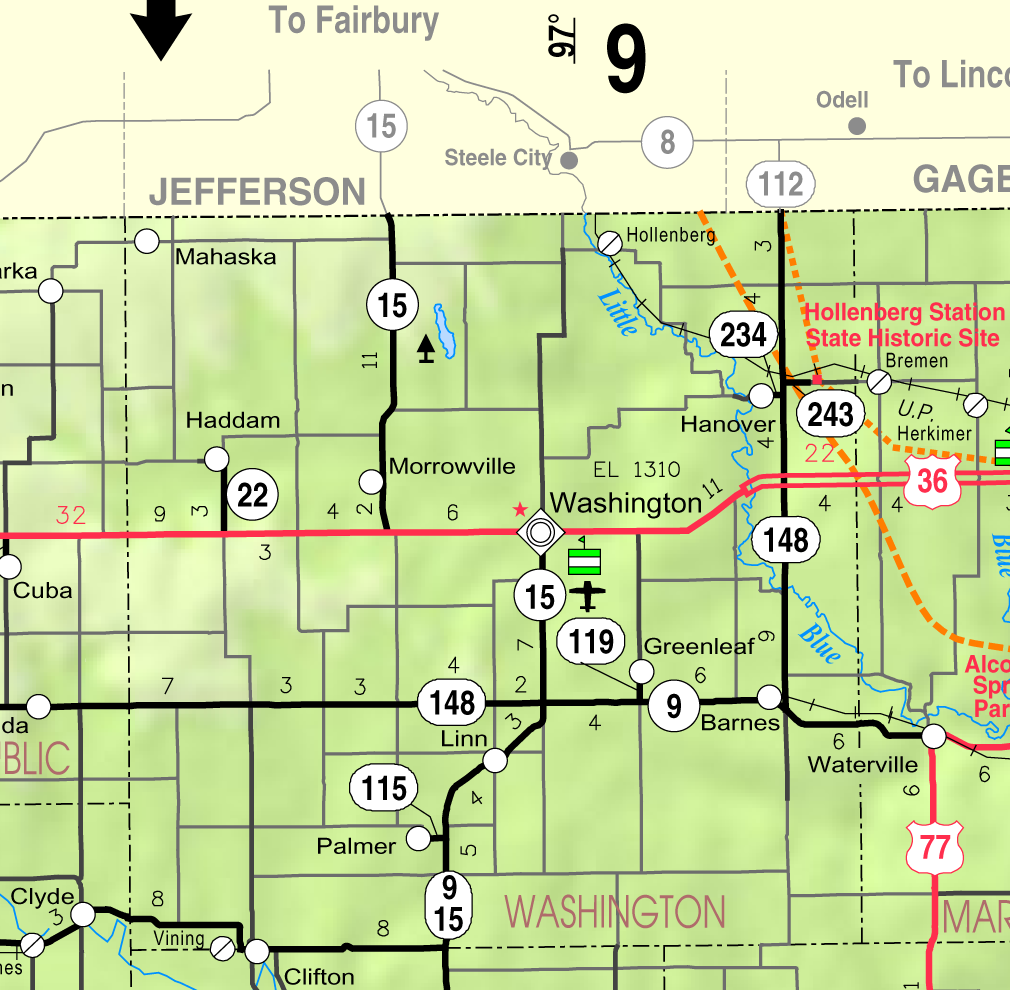
- KDOT map of Washington County (legend)
- Coordinates: 39°40′45″N 97°05′12″W
- Country: United States
- State: Kansas
- County: Washington
- Founded: 1877
- Incorporated: 1911
- Named for: Lewis F. Linn

Area
  - Total: 0.34 sq mi (0.88 km^{2})
  - Land: 0.34 sq mi (0.88 km^{2})
  - Water: 0 sq mi (0.00 km^{2})
- Elevation: 1,457 ft (444 m)

Population (2020)
  - Total: 387
  - Density: 1,100/sq mi (440/km^{2})
- Time zone: UTC-6 (CST)
  - Summer (DST): UTC-5 (CDT)
- ZIP Code: 66953
- Area code: 785
- FIPS code: 20-41425
- GNIS ID: 2395720
- Website: www.cityoflinnks.com

Linn is a city in Washington County, Kansas, United States. As of the 2020 census, the population of the city was 387.

== History ==
Linn was founded in 1877. It was named for Lewis F. Linn, a U.S. Senator from Missouri.

The first post office in Linn was established in January 1878.

== Geography ==
According to the United States Census Bureau, the city has a total area of 0.34 square miles (0.88 km^{2}), all land.

== Demographics ==
Historical population
| Census | Pop. | Note | %± |
|---|---|---|---|
| 1920 | 282 | | — |
| 1930 | 340 | | 20.6% |
| 1940 | 395 | | 16.2% |
| 1950 | 395 | | 0.0% |
| 1960 | 466 | | 18.0% |
| 1970 | 388 | | −16.7% |
| 1980 | 483 | | 24.5% |
| 1990 | 472 | | −2.3% |
| 2000 | 425 | | −10.0% |
| 2010 | 410 | | −3.5% |
| 2020 | 387 | | −5.6% |
U.S. Decennial Census

=== 2020 census ===
The 2020 United States census counted 387 people, 153 households, and 94 families in Linn. The population density was 1,141.6 per square mile (440.8/km^{2}). There were 164 housing units at an average density of 483.8 per square mile (186.8/km^{2}). The racial makeup was 80.88% (313) white or European American (74.68% non-Hispanic white), 0.0% (0) black or African-American, 0.52% (2) Native American or Alaska Native, 0.0% (0) Asian, 0.0% (0) Pacific Islander or Native Hawaiian, 10.85% (42) from other races, and 7.75% (30) from two or more races. Hispanic or Latino of any race was 22.74% (88) of the population.

Of the 153 households, 30.7% had children under the age of 18; 50.3% were married couples living together; 19.6% had a female householder with no spouse or partner present. 37.3% of households consisted of individuals and 22.2% had someone living alone who was 65 years of age or older. The average household size was 1.9 and the average family size was 3.1. The percent of those with a bachelor's degree or higher was estimated to be 8.3% of the population.

22.0% of the population was under the age of 18, 4.7% from 18 to 24, 25.3% from 25 to 44, 21.7% from 45 to 64, and 26.4% who were 65 years of age or older. The median age was 42.3 years. For every 100 females, there were 109.2 males. For every 100 females ages 18 and older, there were 106.8 males.

The 2016–2020 5-year American Community Survey estimates show that the median household income was $55,250 (with a margin of error of +/- $3,390) and the median family income was $56,917 (+/- $2,963). Males had a median income of $45,500 (+/- $5,472) versus $21,250 (+/- $17,012) for females. The median income for those above 16 years old was $32,045 (+/- $10,644). Approximately, 0.0% of families and 4.1% of the population were below the poverty line, including 0.0% of those under the age of 18 and 4.7% of those ages 65 or over.

=== 2010 census ===
As of the census of 2010, there were 410 people, 152 households, and 97 families residing in the city. The population density was 1,205.9 inhabitants per square mile (465.6/km^{2}). There were 165 housing units at an average density of 485.3 per square mile (187.4/km^{2}). The racial makeup of the city was 94.1% White, 1.2% African American, 0.7% Native American, 2.9% from other races, and 1.0% from two or more races. Hispanic or Latino of any race were 12.4% of the population.

There were 152 households, of which 28.9% had children under the age of 18 living with them, 55.9% were married couples living together, 6.6% had a female householder with no husband present, 1.3% had a male householder with no wife present, and 36.2% were non-families. 34.2% of all households were made up of individuals, and 19% had someone living alone who was 65 years of age or older. The average household size was 2.30 and the average family size was 2.98.

The median age in the city was 48.1 years. 21.5% of residents were under the age of 18; 5.6% were between the ages of 18 and 24; 18.6% were from 25 to 44; 19.7% were from 45 to 64; and 34.6% were 65 years of age or older. The gender makeup of the city was 45.6% male and 54.4% female.

=== 2000 census ===
As of the census of 2000, there were 425 people, 164 households, and 102 families residing in the city. The population density was 1,270.9 inhabitants per square mile (490.7/km^{2}). There were 186 housing units at an average density of 556.2 per square mile (214.8/km^{2}). The racial makeup of the city was 100.00% White. Hispanic or Latino of any race were 0.47% of the population.

There were 164 households, out of which 22.6% had children under the age of 18 living with them, 57.9% were married couples living together, 4.3% had a female householder with no husband present, and 37.2% were non-families. 35.4% of all households were made up of individuals, and 22.0% had someone living alone who was 65 years of age or older. The average household size was 2.09 and the average family size was 2.71.

In the city, the population was spread out, with 17.9% under the age of 18, 2.6% from 18 to 24, 20.2% from 25 to 44, 16.0% from 45 to 64, and 43.3% who were 65 years of age or older. The median age was 59 years. For every 100 females, there were 78.6 males. For every 100 females age 18 and over, there were 71.1 males.

The median income for a household in the city was $27,619, and the median income for a family was $35,909. Males had a median income of $24,167 versus $18,125 for females. The per capita income for the city was $17,624. About 4.5% of families and 7.8% of the population were below the poverty line, including 5.6% of those under age 18 and 15.6% of those age 65 or over.

== Education ==
The community and nearby rural areas are served by Barnes–Hanover–Linn USD 223 public school district.
