= Barnes–Hanover–Linn USD 223 =

Public school district in Barnes, Kansas

Address
- 212 N. Tripp St. Barnes, Kansas, 66933; United States

District information
- Type: Public
- Grades: Pre-K to 12
- Schools: 2

Other information
- Website: usd223.org

Barnes–Hanover–Linn USD 223 is a public unified school district headquartered in Barnes, Kansas, United States. The district includes the communities of Barnes, Hanover, Hollenberg, Linn, Palmer, Lanham, and nearby rural areas.

== Schools ==
The school district operates the following schools:

- Hanover Schools
- Linn Schools
- Early Childhood Preschool

== See also ==
- List of high schools in Kansas
- List of unified school districts in Kansas
- Kansas State Department of Education
- Kansas State High School Activities Association
