= The Immortal Ten =

Group of Kansan abolitionists

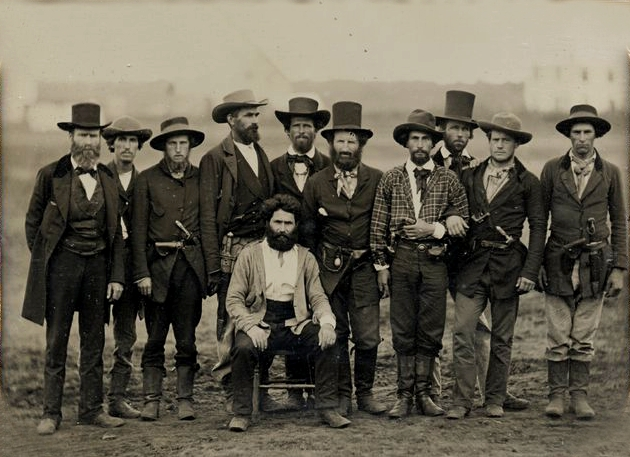
"The Immortal Ten", Lawrence, Kansas Territory, 1859. Standing, from left to right: Major James B. Abbott, Captain Joshua A. Pike, Jacob Senix, Joseph Gardner, Thomas Simmons, S.J. Willis, Charles Doy, Captain John E. Stuart [Stewart], Silas Soule, and George R. Hay. Seated in front: Dr. John Doy.

The Immortal Ten were a group of militant abolitionists and Free-Staters in the Kansas Territory who, on July 23, 1859, freed Dr. John Doy from a Missouri jail, where he was being held for allegedly abducting slaves. Doy and his 19-year-old son Charles were fellow abolitionists who had been arrested by pro-slavery Missouri bounty hunters while trying to deliver slaves to freedom in the Nebraska Territory via the Underground Railroad. While his son was acquitted of the charges and released, John was sentenced to prison. The ten men who took it upon themselves to rescue Doy were led by Major James B. Abbott and included Doy's son Charles, George R. Hay, Silas Soule, Capt. John E. Stewart, S.J. Willis, Thomas Simmons, Joseph Gardner, Jacob Senix, and Captain Joshua A. Pike. The episode occurred during a period of violent interstate ideological conflict preceding the American Civil War known as "Bleeding Kansas".

== Capture of John and Charles Doy ==
On January 25, 1859, the Doys were passing through Lawrence, Kansas en route to the Nebraska Territory with thirteen slaves. John and Charles were just 12 miles outside of Lawrence when they were caught and surrounded by a group of armed pro-slavery "Border Ruffians" who had come from Missouri (a slave state) for the purpose of capturing escaped slaves and stopping activity on the Underground Railroad. When confronted, John was threatened to be killed on the spot. All that he asked was that they did not fire toward the carriage, since there were women and children inside. The option of fighting back was not in the Doys' favor as they were greatly outnumbered. Both John and Charles were arrested and thrown in jail temporarily until their trial on March 20, 1859, in St. Joseph, Missouri. Charles was eventually cleared of all charges, but the jury could not agree on a verdict for John and he was tried a second time. At the second trial, Dr. Doy was convicted of abducting slaves and sentenced to five years in the Missouri State Penitentiary.

== Rescue ==
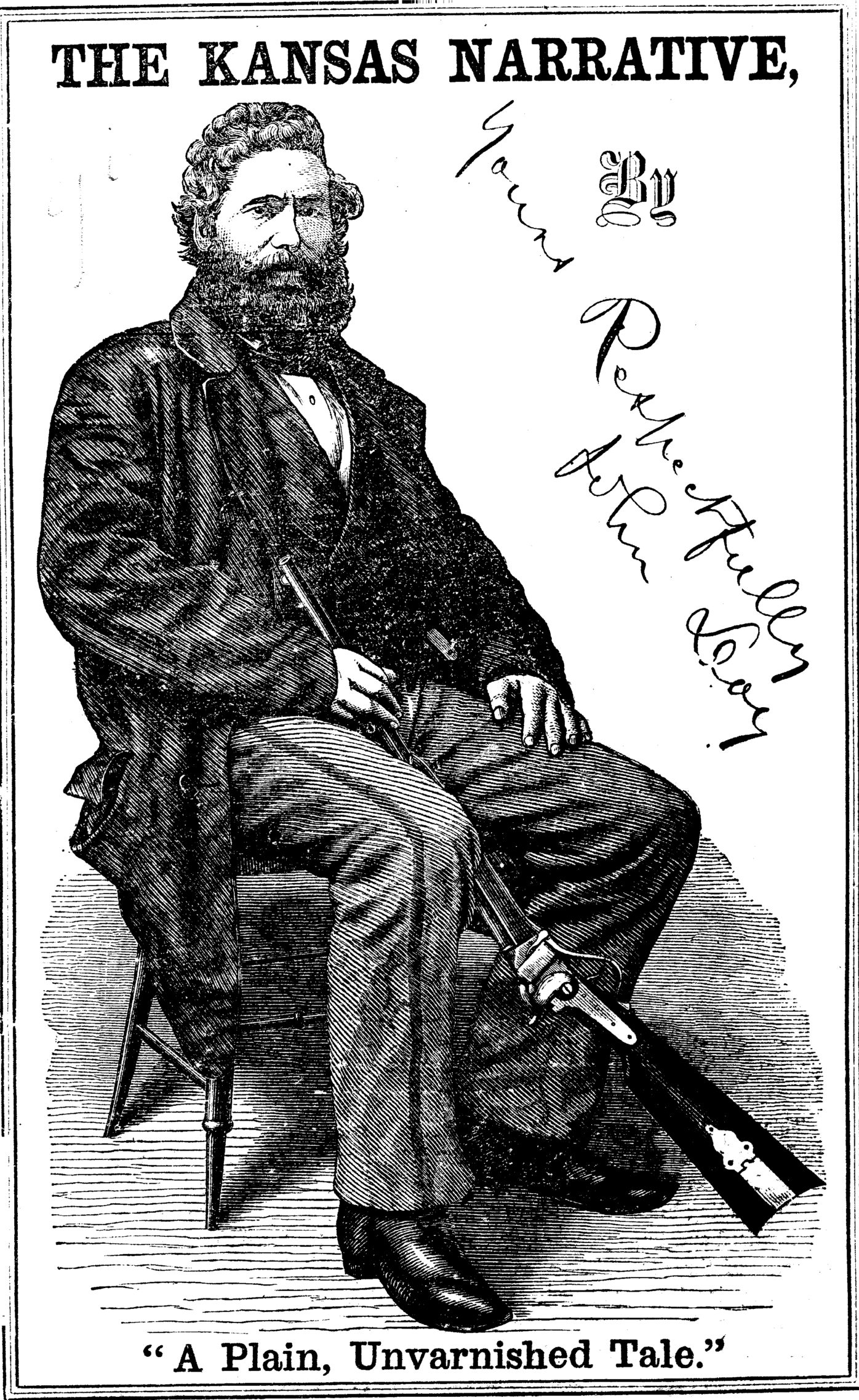
Doy's account of his ordeal

In the summer of 1859, while Dr. Doy was imprisoned in the St. Joseph jail, Major James B. Abbott put together a crew of ten men to rescue him. The plan was carried out on July 23. Two of the men pretended to be bounty hunters who had caught a horse thief (who was also part of the crew) and distracted the guards while the rest of the men overtook the prison and went after Doy. Doy was found very ill and unable to walk due to exhaustion and disease, so a couple of the men carried him out. A famous ambrotype photograph of the Immortal Ten was taken in Lawrence by photographer Amon Gilbert DaLee shortly after the rescue. It depicts the whole crew together while Doy is sitting in a chair in the front, unable to stand on his own.

A bounty was put on Doy's head for $100 if caught outside Missouri and $50 if caught inside Missouri. Soon after his escape, Dr. Doy left Lawrence for Rochester, New York, where he published a book, The narrative of John Doy, of Lawrence, Kansas : "A plain, unvarnished tale" (1860), giving an account of his trial and conviction. His book spoke kindly of the witnesses and attorneys who prosecuted him, but bitterly of the officers and jury who convicted him. He died in New York a few years later. His son Charles was hanged in southern Kansas for horse theft in the fall of 1860.

== Later achievements of the Immortal Ten ==
One member of the Immortal Ten was acknowledged for his brave act and was able to make his own place in history. Silas Soule was a well-known anti-slavery militant and a personal friend of John Brown and Walt Whitman. During the American Civil War, he joined a Colorado volunteer army fighting for the Union and was eventually promoted to the rank of captain. Soule was present at the Sand Creek Massacre in Colorado in 1864, where he ordered his unit not to participate in the slaughter. He also later testified against the units that did participate and was murdered as a result.

== Film ==
Doy's rescue by the Immortal Ten is the subject of a 2017 book by author Gary Jenkins, The Immortal 10: A Story from the Kansas Underground Railroad. A documentary film based on the book, The Immortal 10 and the Rescue of Dr. John Doy, was also released.
