= Hollenberg, Kansas =

City in Washington County, Kansas

- City
- Location within Washington County and Kansas

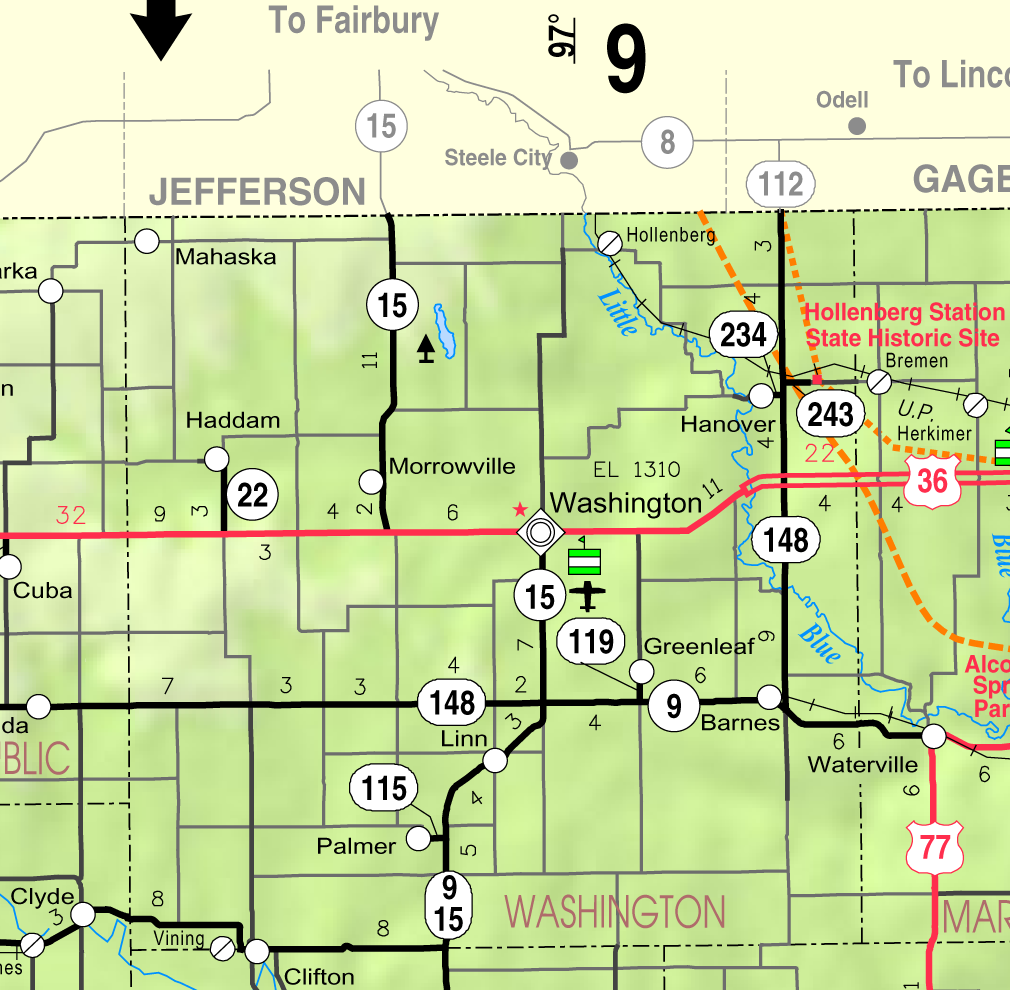
- KDOT map of Washington County (legend)
- Coordinates: 39°58′52″N 96°59′31″W
- Country: United States
- State: Kansas
- County: Washington
- Founded: 1872
- Platted: 1872
- Incorporated: 1937
- Named for: G.H. Hollenberg

Area
  - Total: 0.073 sq mi (0.19 km^{2})
  - Land: 0.073 sq mi (0.19 km^{2})
  - Water: 0 sq mi (0.00 km^{2})
- Elevation: 1,309 ft (399 m)

Population (2020)
  - Total: 10
  - Density: 140/sq mi (53/km^{2})
- Time zone: UTC-6 (CST)
  - Summer (DST): UTC-5 (CDT)
- ZIP Code: 66946
- Area code: 785
- FIPS code: 20-32650
- GNIS ID: 2394403

Hollenberg is a city in Washington County, Kansas, United States. As of the 2020 census, the population of the city was 10. It is located 1.5 miles south of the Nebraska state line.

== History ==
Hollenberg was laid out in 1872. It was named for its founder, G. H. Hollenberg, who owned a store at the site.

The first post office in Hollenberg was established in April 1872.

== Geography ==
According to the United States Census Bureau, the city has a total area of 0.08 square miles (0.21 km^{2}), all land. The community is approximately 1.5 miles (2.4 km) south of the Kansas-Nebraska state line.

== Demographics ==
Historical population
Census	Pop.	Note	%±
1940	128		—
1950	97		−24.2%
1960	55		−43.3%
1970	47		−14.5%
1980	57		21.3%
1990	28		−50.9%
2000	31		10.7%
2010	21		−32.3%
2020	10		−52.4%
U.S. Decennial Census

=== 2020 census ===
The 2020 United States census counted 10 people, 5 households, and 0 families in Hollenberg. The population density was 137.0 per square mile (52.9/km^{2}). There were 15 housing units at an average density of 205.5 per square mile (79.3/km^{2}). The racial makeup was 90.0% (9) white or European American (90.0% non-Hispanic white), 0.0% (0) black or African-American, 0.0% (0) Native American or Alaska Native, 0.0% (0) Asian, 0.0% (0) Pacific Islander or Native Hawaiian, 0.0% (0) from other races, and 10.0% (1) from two or more races. Hispanic or Latino of any race was 0.0% (0) of the population.

Of the 5 households, 0.0% had children under the age of 18; 0.0% were married couples living together; 60.0% had a female householder with no spouse or partner present. 100.0% of households consisted of individuals and 40.0% had someone living alone who was 65 years of age or older. The average household size was 1.2 and the average family size was 2.0. The percent of those with a bachelor's degree or higher was estimated to be 0.0% of the population.

10.0% of the population was under the age of 18, 10.0% from 18 to 24, 20.0% from 25 to 44, 20.0% from 45 to 64, and 40.0% who were 65 years of age or older. The median age was 52.5 years. For every 100 females, there were 66.7 males. For every 100 females ages 18 and older, there were 80.0 males.

=== 2010 census ===
As of the census of 2010, there were 21 people, 12 households, and 4 families residing in the city. The population density was 262.5 inhabitants per square mile (101.4/km^{2}). There were 23 housing units at an average density of 287.5 per square mile (111.0/km^{2}). The racial makeup of the city was 90.5% White, 4.8% from other races, and 4.8% from two or more races. Hispanic or Latino of any race were 4.8% of the population.

There were 12 households, of which 8.3% had children under the age of 18 living with them, 33.3% were married couples living together, and 66.7% were non-families. 50.0% of all households were made up of individuals. The average household size was 1.75 and the average family size was 2.75.

The median age in the city was 55.3 years. 9.5% of residents were under the age of 18; 0.0% were between the ages of 18 and 24; 9.6% were from 25 to 44; 71.4% were from 45 to 64; and 9.5% were 65 years of age or older. The gender makeup of the city was 52.4% male and 47.6% female.

=== 2000 census ===
As of the census of 2000, there were 31 people, 18 households, and 7 families residing in the city. The population density was 381.5 inhabitants per square mile (147.3/km^{2}). There were 28 housing units at an average density of 344.6 per square mile (133.1/km^{2}). The racial makeup of the city was 96.77% White, 3.23% from other races. Hispanic or Latino of any race were 3.23% of the population.

There were 18 households, out of which 16.7% had children under the age of 18 living with them, 27.8% were married couples living together, 5.6% had a female householder with no husband present, and 61.1% were non-families. 50.0% of all households were made up of individuals, and 11.1% had someone living alone who was 65 years of age or older. The average household size was 1.72 and the average family size was 2.43.

In the city, the population was spread out, with 12.9% under the age of 18, 3.2% from 18 to 24, 16.1% from 25 to 44, 48.4% from 45 to 64, and 19.4% who were 65 years of age or older. The median age was 52 years. For every 100 females, there were 106.7 males. For every 100 females age 18 and over, there were 125.0 males.

The median income for a household in the city was $11,667, and the median income for a family was $52,083. Males had a median income of $36,875 versus $16,250 for females. The per capita income for the city was $13,143. There were no families and 14.3% of the population living below the poverty line, including no under eighteens and 100.0% of those over 64.

== Education ==
The community and nearby rural areas are served by Barnes–Hanover–Linn USD 223 public school district.

Hollenberg High School was closed through school unification. The Hollenberg High School mascot was Pirates.
