= Palmer, Kansas =

City in Washington County, Kansas

- City
- Location within Washington County and Kansas

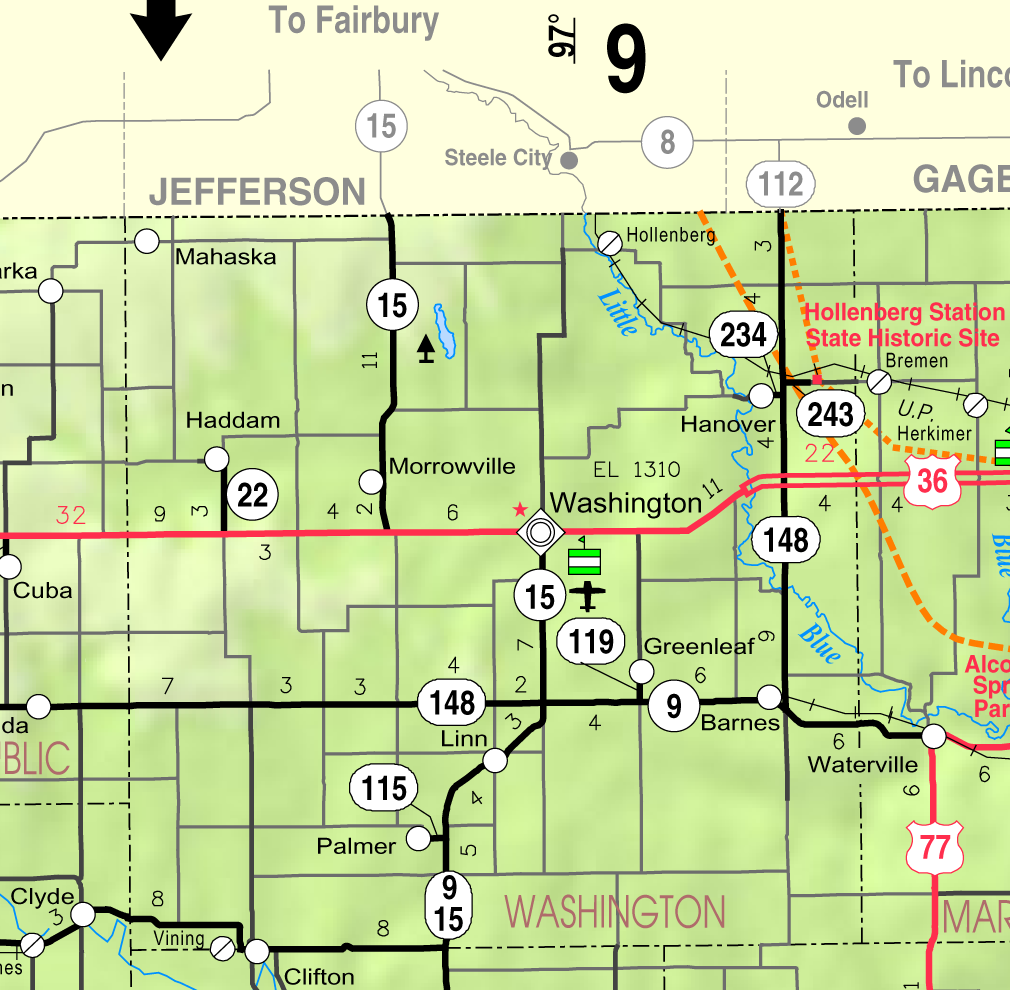
- KDOT map of Washington County (legend)
- Coordinates: 39°38′00″N 97°08′24″W
- Country: United States
- State: Kansas
- County: Washington
- Founded: 1878
- Incorporated: 1911
- Named for: J. Palmer

Area
  - Total: 0.31 sq mi (0.81 km^{2})
  - Land: 0.31 sq mi (0.80 km^{2})
  - Water: 0.0039 sq mi (0.01 km^{2})
- Elevation: 1,329 ft (405 m)

Population (2020)
  - Total: 125
  - Density: 400/sq mi (160/km^{2})
- Time zone: UTC-6 (CST)
  - Summer (DST): UTC-5 (CDT)
- ZIP Code: 66962
- Area code: 785
- FIPS code: 20-54200
- GNIS ID: 2396130

Palmer is a city in Washington County, Kansas, United States. As of the 2020 census, the population of the city was 125.

== History ==
Palmer was founded in 1878. It was named for J. Palmer, a teacher.

The first post office in Palmer was established in June 1878.

== Geography ==
According to the United States Census Bureau, the city has a total area of 0.31 square miles (0.80 km^{2}), all land.

== Demographics ==
Historical population
Census	Pop.	Note	%±
1880	125		—
1890	203		62.4%
1920	179		—
1930	187		4.5%
1940	182		−2.7%
1950	150		−17.6%
1960	169		12.7%
1970	166		−1.8%
1980	149		−10.2%
1990	121		−18.8%
2000	108		−10.7%
2010	111		2.8%
2020	125		12.6%
U.S. Decennial Census

=== 2020 census ===
The 2020 United States census counted 125 people, 55 households, and 37 families in Palmer. The population density was 404.5 per square mile (156.2/km^{2}). There were 63 housing units at an average density of 203.9 per square mile (78.7/km^{2}). The racial makeup was 98.4% (123) white or European American (98.4% non-Hispanic white), 0.0% (0) black or African-American, 0.0% (0) Native American or Alaska Native, 0.0% (0) Asian, 0.0% (0) Pacific Islander or Native Hawaiian, 0.8% (1) from other races, and 0.8% (1) from two or more races. Hispanic or Latino of any race was 0.8% (1) of the population.

Of the 55 households, 30.9% had children under the age of 18; 61.8% were married couples living together; 21.8% had a female householder with no spouse or partner present. 30.9% of households consisted of individuals and 16.4% had someone living alone who was 65 years of age or older. The average household size was 2.4 and the average family size was 2.9. The percent of those with a bachelor's degree or higher was estimated to be 13.6% of the population.

26.4% of the population was under the age of 18, 4.8% from 18 to 24, 23.2% from 25 to 44, 20.8% from 45 to 64, and 24.8% who were 65 years of age or older. The median age was 41.1 years. For every 100 females, there were 104.9 males. For every 100 females ages 18 and older, there were 109.1 males.

The 2016–2020 5-year American Community Survey estimates show that the median household income was $58,750 (with a margin of error of +/- $41,951) and the median family income was $76,250 (+/- $18,654). Males had a median income of $41,250 (+/- $21,489) versus $20,417 (+/- $11,145) for females. The median income for those above 16 years old was $29,688 (+/- $12,474). Approximately, 13.2% of families and 23.1% of the population were below the poverty line, including 38.2% of those under the age of 18 and 18.2% of those ages 65 or over.

=== 2010 census ===
As of the census of 2010, there were 111 people, 50 households, and 34 families residing in the city. The population density was 358.1 inhabitants per square mile (138.3/km^{2}). There were 62 housing units at an average density of 200.0 per square mile (77.2/km^{2}). The racial makeup of the city was 89.2% White and 10.8% from other races. Hispanic or Latino of any race were 13.5% of the population.

There were 50 households, of which 24.0% had children under the age of 18 living with them, 64.0% were married couples living together, 2.0% had a female householder with no husband present, 2.0% had a male householder with no wife present, and 32.0% were non-families. 32.0% of all households were made up of individuals, and 12% had someone living alone who was 65 years of age or older. The average household size was 2.22 and the average family size was 2.76.

The median age in the city was 50.1 years. 17.1% of residents were under the age of 18; 9.9% were between the ages of 18 and 24; 19.8% were from 25 to 44; 33.3% were from 45 to 64; and 19.8% were 65 years of age or older. The gender makeup of the city was 50.5% male and 49.5% female.

=== 2000 census ===
As of the census of 2000, there were 108 people, 48 households, and 28 families residing in the city. The population density was 342.5 inhabitants per square mile (132.2/km^{2}). There were 55 housing units at an average density of 174.4 per square mile (67.3/km^{2}). The racial makeup of the city was 99.07% White and 0.93% Native American. Hispanic or Latino of any race were 2.78% of the population.

There were 48 households, out of which 27.1% had children under the age of 18 living with them, 56.3% were married couples living together, 2.1% had a female householder with no husband present, and 39.6% were non-families. 37.5% of all households were made up of individuals, and 22.9% had someone living alone who was 65 years of age or older. The average household size was 2.25 and the average family size was 2.97.

In the city, the population was spread out, with 24.1% under the age of 18, 4.6% from 18 to 24, 21.3% from 25 to 44, 22.2% from 45 to 64, and 27.8% who were 65 years of age or older. The median age was 44 years. For every 100 females, there were 103.8 males. For every 100 females age 18 and over, there were 105.0 males.

The median income for a household in the city was $31,042, and the median income for a family was $35,625. Males had a median income of $23,750 versus $19,375 for females. The per capita income for the city was $14,670. There were 8.0% of families and 11.8% of the population living below the poverty line, including no under eighteens and 30.0% of those over 64.

== Education ==
The community and nearby rural areas are served by Barnes–Hanover–Linn USD 223 public school district.

== See also ==
- Central Branch Union Pacific Railroad
