= Barnes, Kansas =

City in Washington County, Kansas

- City
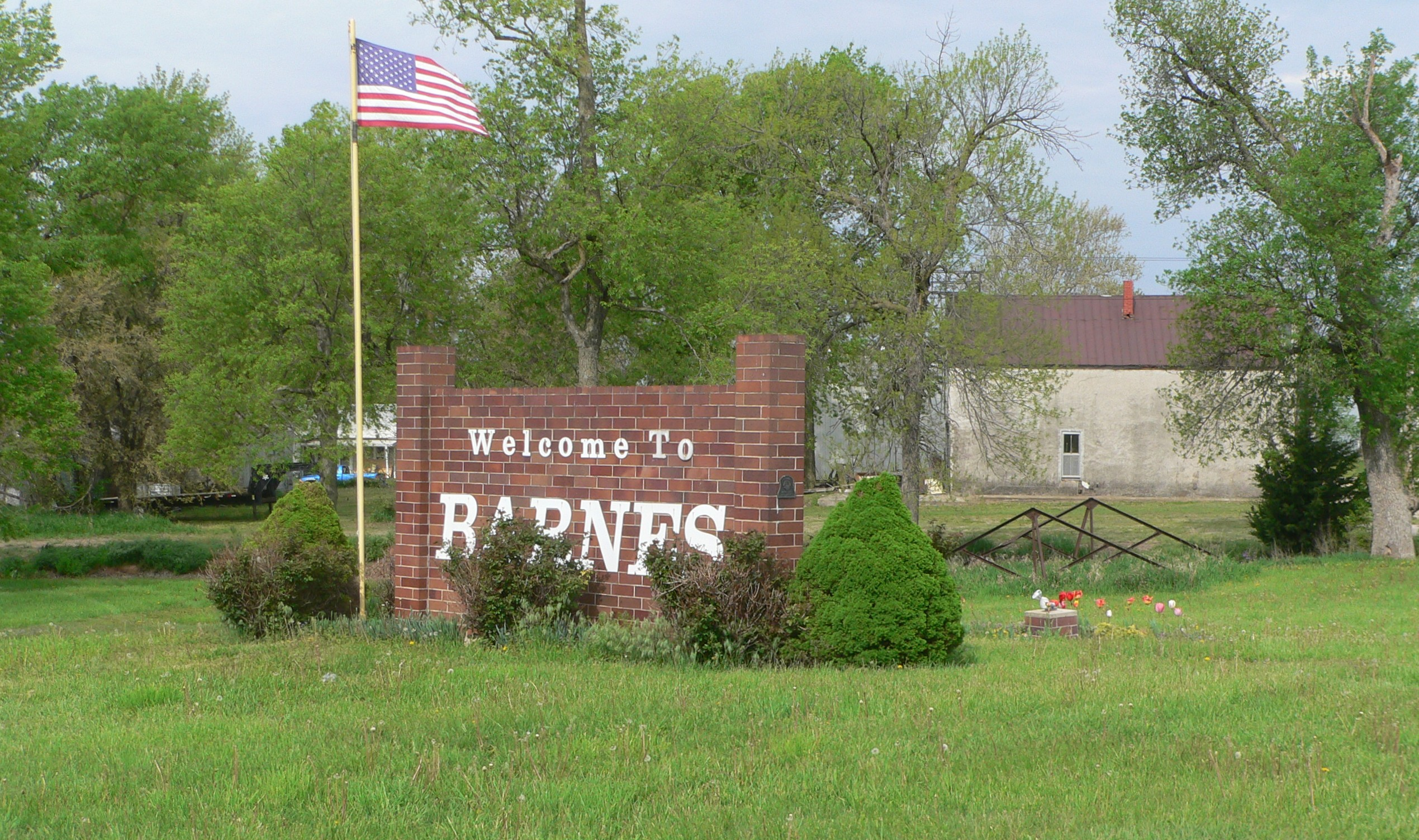
- Welcome sign on Kansas Highway 148

- Location within Washington County and Kansas

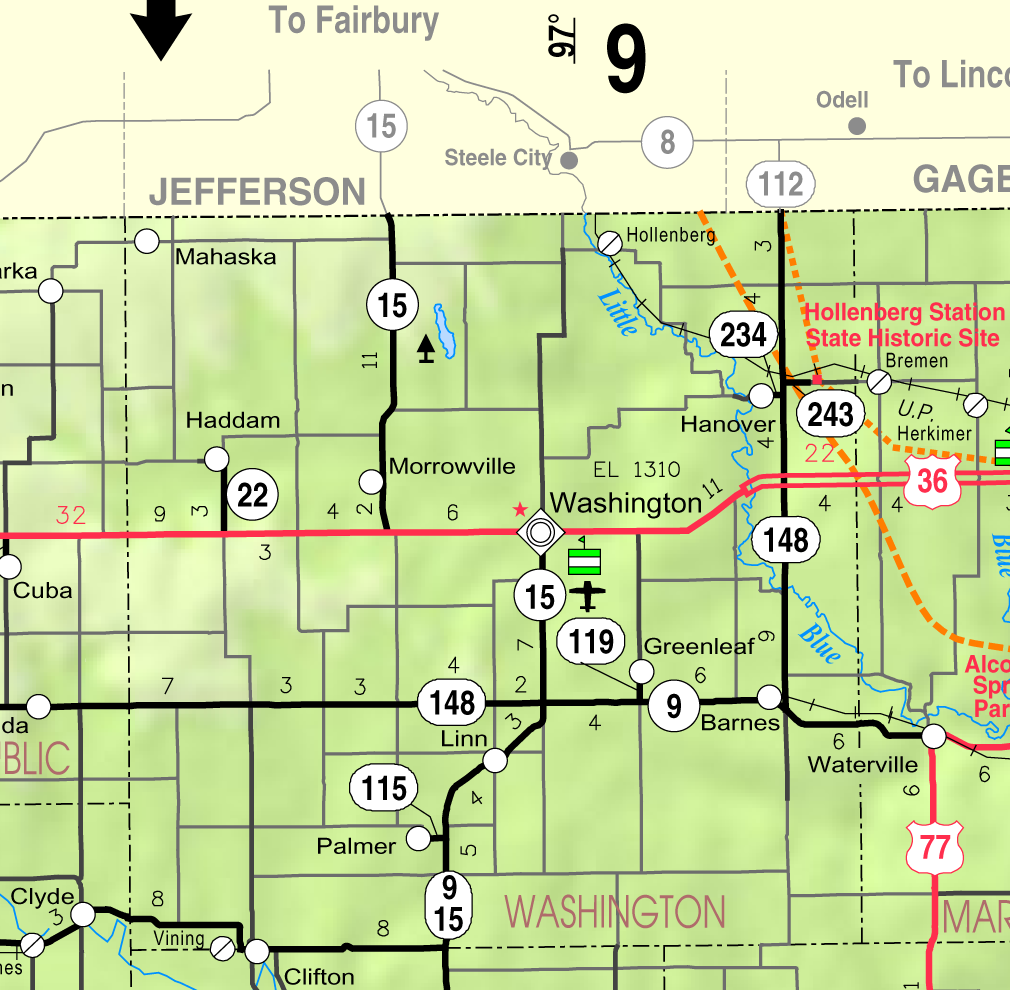
- KDOT map of Washington County (legend)
- Coordinates: 39°42′42″N 96°52′24″W
- Country: United States
- State: Kansas
- County: Washington
- Founded: 1870 (Elm Grove)
- Incorporated: 1897
- Named for: A.S. Barnes

Area
  - Total: 0.18 sq mi (0.46 km^{2})
  - Land: 0.17 sq mi (0.44 km^{2})
  - Water: 0.0077 sq mi (0.02 km^{2})
- Elevation: 1,332 ft (406 m)

Population (2020)
  - Total: 165
  - Density: 970/sq mi (380/km^{2})
- Time zone: UTC-6 (CST)
  - Summer (DST): UTC-5 (CDT)
- ZIP Code: 66933
- Area code: 785
- FIPS code: 20-04250
- GNIS ID: 2394063
- Website: www.barnesks.net

Barnes is a city in Washington County, Kansas, United States. As of the 2020 census, the population of the city was 165.

== History ==
Barnes was originally called Elm Grove when it was founded in 1870. It was renamed Barnes in 1876 in honor of A. S. Barnes, a stockholder of the Central Branch Union Pacific Railroad

Barnes was a station and shipping point on the Missouri Pacific Railroad.

== Geography ==
According to the United States Census Bureau, the city has a total area of 0.18 square miles (0.47 km^{2}), of which 0.17 square miles (0.44 km^{2}) is land and 0.01 square miles (0.03 km^{2}) is water.

== Demographics ==
Historical population
Census	Pop.	Note	%±
1880	32		—
1900	383		—
1910	454		18.5%
1920	395		−13.0%
1930	361		−8.6%
1940	391		8.3%
1950	308		−21.2%
1960	247		−19.8%
1970	209		−15.4%
1980	257		23.0%
1990	167		−35.0%
2000	152		−9.0%
2010	159		4.6%
2020	165		3.8%
U.S. Decennial Census

=== 2020 census ===
The 2020 United States census counted 165 people, 72 households, and 48 families in Barnes. The population density was 970.6 per square mile (374.7/km^{2}). There were 82 housing units at an average density of 482.4 per square mile (186.2/km^{2}). The racial makeup was 87.88% (145) white or European American (80.61% non-Hispanic white), 0.0% (0) black or African-American, 0.0% (0) Native American or Alaska Native, 0.0% (0) Asian, 0.0% (0) Pacific Islander or Native Hawaiian, 2.42% (4) from other races, and 9.7% (16) from two or more races. Hispanic or Latino of any race was 15.15% (25) of the population.

Of the 72 households, 26.4% had children under the age of 18; 54.2% were married couples living together; 27.8% had a female householder with no spouse or partner present. 19.4% of households consisted of individuals and 12.5% had someone living alone who was 65 years of age or older. The average household size was 2.4 and the average family size was 3.4. The percent of those with a bachelor's degree or higher was estimated to be 6.1% of the population.

22.4% of the population was under the age of 18, 7.3% from 18 to 24, 20.0% from 25 to 44, 21.8% from 45 to 64, and 28.5% who were 65 years of age or older. The median age was 45.2 years. For every 100 females, there were 103.7 males. For every 100 females ages 18 and older, there were 113.3 males.

The 2016–2020 5-year American Community Survey estimates show that the median household income was $40,417 (with a margin of error of +/- $11,555) and the median family income was $44,500 (+/- $5,280). Males had a median income of $36,250 (+/- $10,420) versus $16,563 (+/- $6,579) for females. The median income for those above 16 years old was $26,389 (+/- $11,865). Approximately, 12.5% of families and 11.6% of the population were below the poverty line, including 2.3% of those under the age of 18 and 41.0% of those ages 65 or over.

=== 2010 census ===
As of the census of 2010, there were 159 people, 71 households, and 45 families residing in the city. The population density was 935.3 inhabitants per square mile (361.1/km^{2}). There were 89 housing units at an average density of 523.5 per square mile (202.1/km^{2}). The racial makeup of the city was 95.0% White, 1.3% Native American, and 3.8% from other races. Hispanic or Latino of any race were 5.0% of the population.

There were 71 households, of which 22.5% had children under the age of 18 living with them, 46.5% were married couples living together, 11.3% had a female householder with no husband present, 5.6% had a male householder with no wife present, and 36.6% were non-families. 35.2% of all households were made up of individuals, and 14.1% had someone living alone who was 65 years of age or older. The average household size was 2.24 and the average family size was 2.82.

The median age in the city was 44.2 years. 23.9% of residents were under the age of 18; 5.6% were between the ages of 18 and 24; 22% were from 25 to 44; 27% were from 45 to 64; and 21.4% were 65 years of age or older. The gender makeup of the city was 52.2% male and 47.8% female.

=== 2000 census ===
As of the census of 2000, there were 152 people, 74 households, and 46 families residing in the city. The population density was 886.2 inhabitants per square mile (342.2/km^{2}). There were 99 housing units at an average density of 577.2 per square mile (222.9/km^{2}). The racial makeup of the city was 98.03% White, 0.66% Asian, and 1.32% from two or more races. Hispanic or Latino of any race were 0.66% of the population.

There were 74 households, out of which 14.9% had children under the age of 18 living with them, 56.8% were married couples living together, 4.1% had a female householder with no husband present, and 37.8% were non-families. 37.8% of all households were made up of individuals, and 17.6% had someone living alone who was 65 years of age or older. The average household size was 2.05 and the average family size was 2.67.

In the city, the population was spread out, with 16.4% under the age of 18, 4.6% from 18 to 24, 25.7% from 25 to 44, 19.1% from 45 to 64, and 34.2% who were 65 years of age or older. The median age was 47 years. For every 100 females, there were 87.7 males. For every 100 females age 18 and over, there were 81.4 males.

The median income for a household in the city was $25,682, and the median income for a family was $26,023. Males had a median income of $24,286 versus $18,750 for females. The per capita income for the city was $16,446. About 4.4% of families and 7.3% of the population were below the poverty line, including none of those under the age of eighteen and 4.5% of those 65 or over.

== Education ==
The community and nearby rural areas are served by Barnes–Hanover–Linn USD 223 public school district.

Barnes schools were closed in 1965 through school unification. The Barnes High School mascot was Bullets.

== Notable people ==
- Omar Knedlik, (1915–1989), inventor of the ICEE frozen drink
- Joe Vogler, (1913–1993), Alaskan politician

== See also ==
- Central Branch Union Pacific Railroad
