= Hanover, Kansas =

City in Washington County, Kansas

- City
- Location within Washington County and Kansas

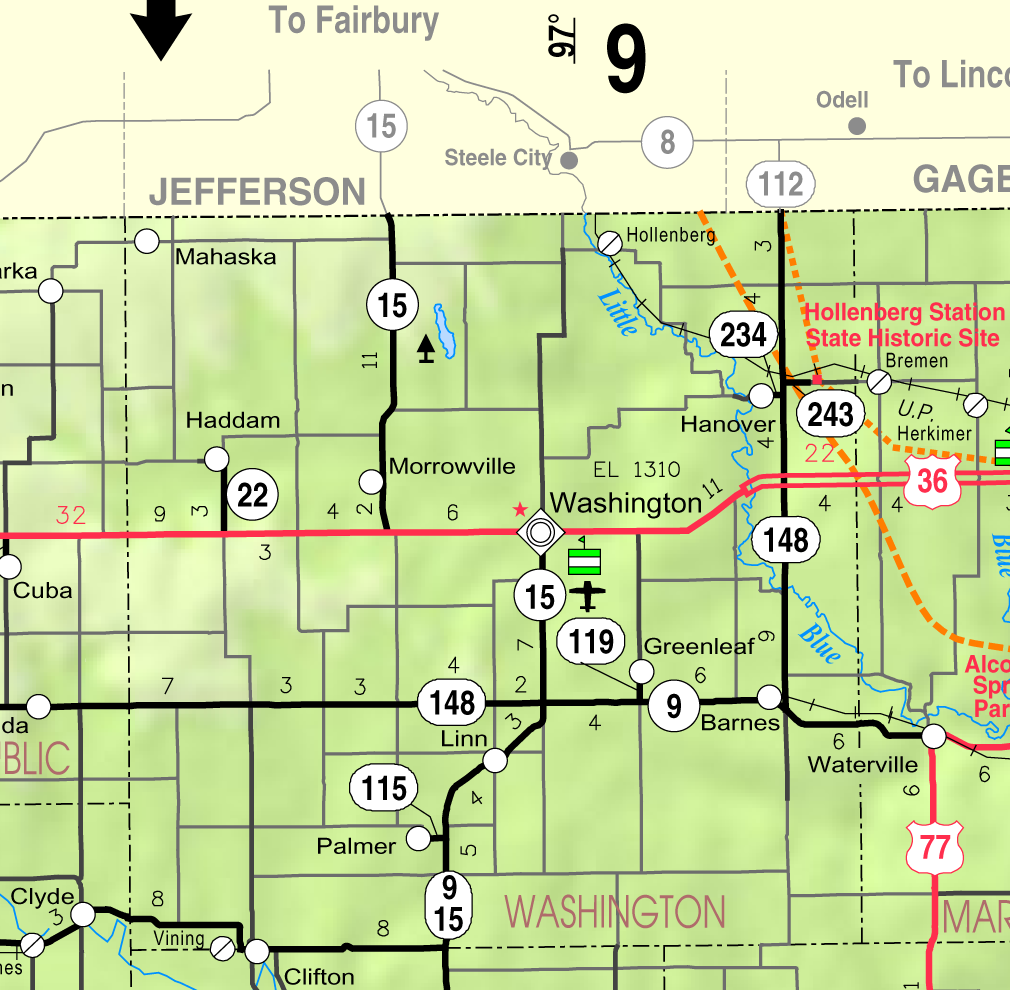
- KDOT map of Washington County (legend)
- Coordinates: 39°53′35″N 96°52′30″W
- Country: United States
- State: Kansas
- County: Washington
- Platted: 1869
- Incorporated: 1872
- Named for: Hanover, Germany

Government
  - Mayor: Jim Scheetz

Area
  - Total: 0.60 sq mi (1.55 km^{2})
  - Land: 0.60 sq mi (1.55 km^{2})
  - Water: 0 sq mi (0.00 km^{2})
- Elevation: 1,280 ft (390 m)

Population (2020)
  - Total: 690
  - Density: 1,200/sq mi (450/km^{2})
- Time zone: UTC-6 (CST)
  - Summer (DST): UTC-5 (CDT)
- ZIP Code: 66945
- Area code: 785
- FIPS code: 20-29875
- GNIS ID: 2394289
- Website: City website

Hanover is a city in Washington County, Kansas, United States. As of the 2020 census, the population of the city was 690. It is located approximately 7.5 miles (12.1 km) south of the Nebraska-Kansas state line.

== History ==
The "Hollenberg Station" became an important hub along the way for Pony Express travelers and Geret Hollenberg eventually established a grocery and stage depot on his farm in 1858. The Hollenberg farm housed nine boarding rooms, and the success of "Hollenberg Station" as a business attracted more people to the area and many settled alongside the Hollenbergs in the decade leading up to the establishment of Hanover.

Prior to the establishment of the town, in 1868 a school district was established in the area to satisfy the need to educate children of settlers who continued to arrive near the "Hollenberg Station."

Hanover was laid out in 1869, and incorporated as a city in 1872. It is a German community named after Hanover, Germany. The founders Geret Hollenberg and Sophia Brockmeyer settled their farm originally called "The Cottonwood Ranch" and later the "Hollenberg Station" alongside the Little Blue River, which became a popular stop along the Pony Express. The popularity led to the establishment of Hanover. The Hollenberg Pony Express Station is the only remaining building along the two thousand mile route, and it continues to stand one mile northeast of Hanover. In the 1940s it was registered as a National Historic Landmark.

Hollenberg, who laid out the original plans for the town in 1869, decided to name it Hanover after his hometown in Germany. A contemporary of Hollenberg wrote at the time that Hanover represented "just a little bit of Germany" in Kansas Territory. Located at the junction of two railroads, it was an important shipping point. Access to the railroad was greatly contributed to the economic growth of Hanover, enabling the expansion of the local grain elevator. The success of the grain elevator, because of its close connection with the railroad contributed to the growth and initial success of the town. As the town continued to develop, a German Evangelical Society church, as well as a Catholic church to serve the town's Czech residents were established in 1870. Additionally, following the movement of some Native groups to Oklahoma from the nearby Ottoe reservation, some land was annexed by the Hanover township, which allowed for further expansion as more white settlers moved into the area.

The local area had a significant Native American population. The Pawnee Indians resided west of Hanover, the Kansa and Kaw tribes lived to the south, and the Otoe Indians were located north. The Otoe Reservation resided north of Hanover on the Kansas-Nebraska border from 1854 to 1883. Their reservation was 160,000 acres large (250 mi^{2}). When the Otoe tribal lands were sold in 1883, the land sold for a record-high average of $12.22 per acre. By comparison, most other Native American tribes in the central and northern Great Plains were only paid ten cents per acre. Some of the Otoe Indians were relocated to Red Rock, Oklahoma, while many of the mixed-race Otoe Indians were integrated with the local German settlers. Many people in Hanover today have a fraction of Native American ancestry.

The region was especially attractive to German speakers and settlers, and when the town was established Hollenberg continued to draw to settlers of German, as well as Czech origin. Until World War I many residents of Hanover and the surrounding continued to speak their native languages, and to this day many German traditions remain an important aspect of town identity. German settlers often encountered Native people groups such as the Pawnee, Kansa, and the Kaw. Contact between the German settlers and natives were mainly non-violent and few conflicts were reported between the various groups. In fact, a substantial amount of trade took place between the settlers and the native groups.

== Geography ==
According to the United States Census Bureau, the city has a total area of 0.54 square miles (1.40 km^{2}), all land.

== Demographics ==
Historical population
Census	Pop.	Note	%±
1880	578		—
1890	903		56.2%
1900	987		9.3%
1910	1,039		5.3%
1920	947		−8.9%
1930	880		−7.1%
1940	896		1.8%
1950	854		−4.7%
1960	773		−9.5%
1970	793		2.6%
1980	802		1.1%
1990	696		−13.2%
2000	653		−6.2%
2010	682		4.4%
2020	690		1.2%
U.S. Decennial Census

=== 2020 census ===
The 2020 United States census counted 690 people, 268 households, and 158 families in Hanover. The population density was 1,151.9 per square mile (444.8/km^{2}). There were 312 housing units at an average density of 520.9 per square mile (201.1/km^{2}). The racial makeup was 96.38% (665) white or European American (95.22% non-Hispanic white), 0.58% (4) black or African-American, 0.0% (0) Native American or Alaska Native, 0.14% (1) Asian, 0.14% (1) Pacific Islander or Native Hawaiian, 0.72% (5) from other races, and 2.03% (14) from two or more races. Hispanic or Latino of any race was 1.74% (12) of the population.

Of the 268 households, 27.6% had children under the age of 18; 53.4% were married couples living together; 25.7% had a female householder with no spouse or partner present. 39.6% of households consisted of individuals and 21.3% had someone living alone who was 65 years of age or older. The average household size was 2.3 and the average family size was 2.9. The percent of those with a bachelor's degree or higher was estimated to be 15.4% of the population.

26.4% of the population was under the age of 18, 7.0% from 18 to 24, 23.8% from 25 to 44, 22.6% from 45 to 64, and 20.3% who were 65 years of age or older. The median age was 38.3 years. For every 100 females, there were 106.0 males. For every 100 females ages 18 and older, there were 104.8 males.

The 2016–2020 5-year American Community Survey estimates show that the median household income was $56,250 (with a margin of error of +/- $4,115) and the median family income was $71,667 (+/- $13,181). Males had a median income of $41,000 (+/- $5,838) versus $31,538 (+/- $4,725) for females. The median income for those above 16 years old was $36,250 (+/- $4,660). Approximately, 1.8% of families and 1.6% of the population were below the poverty line, including 0.7% of those under the age of 18 and 3.9% of those ages 65 or over.

=== 2010 census ===
As of the census of 2010, there were 682 people, 285 households, and 180 families residing in the city. The population density was 1,263.0 inhabitants per square mile (487.6/km^{2}). There were 314 housing units at an average density of 581.5 per square mile (224.5/km^{2}). The racial makeup of the city was 98.2% White, 0.9% African American, 0.1% Native American, 0.1% Asian, 0.3% from other races, and 0.3% from two or more races. Hispanic or Latino of any race were 0.6% of the population.

There were 285 households, of which 27.4% had children under the age of 18 living with them, 54.7% were married couples living together, 4.2% had a female householder with no husband present, 4.2% had a male householder with no wife present, and 36.8% were non-families. 34.0% of all households were made up of individuals, and 18.3% had someone living alone who was 65 years of age or older. The average household size was 2.35 and the average family size was 3.06.

The median age in the city was 41.8 years. 24.8% of residents were under the age of 18; 7.6% were between the ages of 18 and 24; 21.7% were from 25 to 44; 26.7% were from 45 to 64; and 19.2% were 65 years of age or older. The gender makeup of the city was 50.0% male and 50.0% female.

Hanover is a rural community, so its income is slightly lower than the state average. The median income for a household in the city was $43,250 compared to Kansas's average of $51,332. The per capita income for the city was $15,596, compared to Kansas's per capita income of $26,929. About 9.6% of families and 12.8% of the population were below the poverty line, including 25.0% of those under age 18 and 8.1% of those age 65 or over.

=== 2000 census ===
As of the census of 2000, there were 653 people, 283 households, and 170 families residing in the city. The population density was 1,298.7 inhabitants per square mile (501.4/km^{2}). There were 332 housing units at an average density of 660.3 per square mile (254.9/km^{2}). The racial makeup of the city was 98.32% White, 0.61% African American, 0.46% Native American, and 0.61% from two or more races. Hispanic or Latino of any race were 0.46% of the population.

There were 283 households, out of which 24.0% had children under the age of 18 living with them, 53.4% were married couples living together, 4.2% had a female householder with no husband present, and 39.9% were non-families. 36.7% of all households were made up of individuals, and 23.7% had someone living alone who was 65 years of age or older. The average household size was 2.20 and the average family size was 2.94.

In the city, the population was spread out, with 21.4% under the age of 18, 7.5% from 18 to 24, 22.2% from 25 to 44, 19.9% from 45 to 64, and 28.9% who were 65 years of age or older. The median age was 44 years. For every 100 females, there were 98.5 males. For every 100 females age 18 and over, there were 97.3 males.

The median income for a household in the city was $31,375, and the median income for a family was $38,667. Males had a median income of $25,104 versus $18,235 for females. The per capita income for the city was $15,596. About 5.7% of families and 7.5% of the population were below the poverty line, including 7.7% of those under age 18 and 12.0% of those age 65 or over.

== Government ==
The Hanover government consists of a mayor and five council members. The council meets the second Monday of each month at 7 pm.

== Education ==
=== Primary and secondary education ===
The community and nearby rural areas are served by Barnes–Hanover–Linn USD 223 public school district.

Hanover has Weecat Preschool, Hanover Public School (K–12), and St. John's Catholic School (1–8). Almost all Hanover children start their education in the Hanover Weecat Preschool located in the basement of St. John's Catholic School. This preschool was certified as a nuclear fallout shelter during the Cold War. The children attend kindergarten in Hanover Public School. In first grade the Hanover children are separated into different schools. The predominantly Lutheran population remains in Hanover Public School, while the predominantly Catholic population attends St. John's Catholic School from first through eighth grade.

After eighth grade, children attend Hanover High School, a small 1A high school with 79 students. Several Hanover High School students compete at the national level for the Future Business Leaders of America (FBLA) organization as well as at the state level for FBLA and possibly for other activities such as scholar bowl. The high school also competes well in sports like basketball, football, and track and have won many state championships in Kansas 1a division 2. Many Hanover students complete dual credit courses during high school at Cloud County Community College.

=== Libraries ===
Hanover has a small public library located in the basement of the city hall. It is open for a few hours on Tuesday, Wednesday, Thursday, and Saturday.

== Media ==
The Hanover News is the local newspaper that reports current events in the Hanover area. It has been published weekly since 1877. The newspaper went out of business in 2019.

== See also ==
- Hollenberg Pony Express Station
- Otoe Reservation
