= National Register of Historic Places listings in Montgomery County, Kansas =

Location of Montgomery County in Kansas

This is a list of the National Register of Historic Places listings in Montgomery County, Kansas.

This is intended to be a complete list of the properties and districts on the National Register of Historic Places in Montgomery County, Kansas, United States. The locations of National Register properties and districts for which the latitude and longitude coordinates are included below, may be seen in a map.

There are 37 properties and districts listed on the National Register in the county.

This National Park Service list is complete through NPS recent listings posted September 4, 2026.

== Current listings ==
	Name on the Register	Image	Date listed	Location	City or town	Description
1	Archeological Site Number 14MY1		July 9, 1982 (#82004886)	Address restricted		
2	Archeological Site Number 14MY365		July 9, 1982 (#82004885)	Address restricted	Independence	
3	Archeological Site Number 14MY1320		July 9, 1982 (#82004883)	Address restricted	Independence	
4	Archeological Site Number 14MY1385		July 9, 1982 (#82004884)	Address restricted	Liberty	
5	Charles M. Ball House	Charles M. Ball House	February 7, 2011 (#10001209)	702 Spruce St. 37°02′14″N 95°37′20″W	Coffeyville	
6	Bethel African Methodist Episcopal Church	Bethel African Methodist Episcopal Church	July 28, 1995 (#95000943)	202 W. 12th St. 37°01′56″N 95°37′02″W	Coffeyville	
7	Blakeslee Motor Company Building	Blakeslee Motor Company Building	August 25, 1989 (#89001145)	211 W. Myrtle; 37°13′27″N 95°42′32″W	Independence	
8	Booth Hotel	Booth Hotel	April 28, 1983 (#83000435)	201-209 W. Main St. 37°13′23″N 95°42′30″W	Independence	
9	Booth Theater	Booth Theater	October 13, 1988 (#88001903)	119 W. Myrtle St. 37°13′27″N 95°42′28″W	Independence	
10	Brown Barn		April 8, 2009 (#09000191)	5879 County Road 4300; 37°08′19″N 95°40′27″W	Independence	Agriculture-Related Resources of Kansas MPS
11	W.P. Brown Mansion	W.P. Brown Mansion	December 12, 1976 (#76000833)	S. Walnut and Eldridge Sts. 37°01′13″N 95°36′50″W	Coffeyville	
12	Cedar Manor Farm		January 8, 2014 (#13001041)	2326 Cty. Rd. 6400; 37°33′36″N 95°55′29″W	Fredonia	Part of the Agriculture-Related Resources of Kansas MPS
13	Cherryvale Carnegie Free Library	Cherryvale Carnegie Free Library	August 18, 1987 (#87000961)	329 E. Main; 37°16′01″N 95°32′55″W	Cherryvale	
14	Coffeyville Carnegie Public Library Building	Coffeyville Carnegie Public Library Building	June 25, 1987 (#87000962)	415 W. Eighth; 37°02′09″N 95°37′23″W	Coffeyville	
15	Condon National Bank	Condon National Bank	January 12, 1973 (#73000771)	811 Walnut St. 37°02′08″N 95°36′55″W	Coffeyville	
16	Cook's Hotel	Cook's Hotel	March 8, 2006 (#06000115)	113 West Myrtle; 37°13′27″N 95°42′27″W	Independence	
17	Dewlen-Spohnhauer Bridge	Dewlen-Spohnhauer Bridge	March 10, 1983 (#83000436)	Old U.S. Route 160; 37°13′28″N 95°40′43″W	Independence	
18	Eastep Site		January 30, 2013 (#12001240)	Address restricted	Independence	
19	Elk River Archeological District		September 13, 1978 (#78001279)	Address restricted	Elk City	
20	Federal Building-US Post Office	Federal Building-US Post Office	October 19, 1988 (#88002009)	123 N. 8th 37°13′27″N 95°42′30″W	Independence	
21	First Congregational Church	First Congregational Church	October 8, 2014 (#14000831)	400 N. 9th 37°13′36″N 95°42′33″W	Independence	
22	Hotel Dale	Hotel Dale	January 31, 2008 (#07001483)	206 W. 8th St. 37°02′10″N 95°37′02″W	Coffeyville	
23	Independence Bowstring	Independence Bowstring	January 4, 1990 (#89002180)	Over the Verdigris River, north of junction of Burns and Myrtle Sts. 37°13′29″N 95°41′37″W	Independence	
24	Independence Downtown Historic District	Independence Downtown Historic District	July 19, 2006 (#06000624)	Chestnut, Laurel, Myrtle, Main, Maple between 5th and 9th 37°13′30″N 95°42′18″W	Independence	
25	Independence Junior High School	Independence Junior High School	December 30, 2009 (#09001165)	300 W. Locust St. 37°13′41″N 95°42′37″W	Independence	
26	Independence Public Carnegie Library	Independence Public Carnegie Library	January 11, 1988 (#87002231)	220 E. Maple; 37°13′21″N 95°42′16″W	Independence	
27	Infinity Archeological Site		March 24, 1971 (#71000320)	Southwest of the confluence of the Elk River and Card Creek; 37°15′09″N 95°51′20″W	Independence	
28	William Inge Boyhood Home	William Inge Boyhood Home	January 5, 2018 (#100001947)	514 N 4th St. 37°13′42″N 95°42′09″W	Independence	
29	Memorial Hall	Memorial Hall	June 10, 2005 (#05000554)	Junction of Pennsylvania Ave. and E. Locust St. 37°13′38″N 95°42′22″W	Independence	
30	Midland Theater	Midland Theater	February 9, 2005 (#05000007)	212-214 W. 8th St. 37°02′17″N 95°36′58″W	Coffeyville	
31	Onion Creek Bridge	Onion Creek Bridge	January 4, 1990 (#89002172)	Over Onion Creek, south of Coffeyville; 37°01′33″N 95°39′23″W	Coffeyville	
32	Pennsylvania Avenue Rock Creek Bridge	Pennsylvania Avenue Rock Creek Bridge	July 2, 1985 (#85001437)	Pennsylvania Ave. over Rock Creek; 37°12′51″N 95°42′26″W	Independence	
33	Prairie Oil & Gas Building		August 5, 2024 (#100010595)	200 Arco Place (300 West Myrtle Street); 37°13′29″N 95°42′35″W	Independence	
34	Terminal Building		June 14, 1982 (#82002666)	717 Walnut; 37°02′11″N 95°36′54″W	Coffeyville	
35	Union Implement and Hardware Building-Masonic Temple	Union Implement and Hardware Building-Masonic Temple	October 13, 1988 (#88002008)	121-123 W. Main; 37°13′23″N 95°42′28″W	Independence	
36	Washington School		April 14, 2015 (#15000147)	300 E. Myrtle St. 37°13′30″N 95°42′11″W	Independence	
36	Wesley Chapel		November 26, 2024 (#100011118)	2696 County Road 4500; 37°06′32″N 95°39′23″W	Coffeyville vicinity	

== See also ==
- List of National Historic Landmarks in Kansas
- National Register of Historic Places listings in Kansas
