= Sycamore Township, Montgomery County, Kansas =

Township in Montgomery County, Kansas, U.S.

Sycamore Township
- Township
- Location within Montgomery County
- Coordinates: 37.31958°N 95.748293°W
- Country: United States
- State: Kansas
- County: Montgomery

Area
  - Total: 67.69 sq mi (175.3 km^{2})
  - Land: 64.746 sq mi (167.69 km^{2})
  - Water: 2.944 sq mi (7.62 km^{2}) 4.35%

Population (2020)
  - Total: 805
  - Density: 12.4/sq mi (4.80/km^{2})
- Time zone: UTC-6 (CST)
  - Summer (DST): UTC-5 (CDT)
- Area code: 620

Sycamore Township is a township in Montgomery County, Kansas, United States. As of the 2020 census, its population was 805.

== Geography ==
Sycamore Township covers an area of 67.69 square miles (175.3 square kilometers). Most of Elk City Lake lies within the township, and the Verdigris River flows through the township as well. Part of Elk City State Park lies within the township.

=== Communities ===
- Sycamore

=== Adjacent townships ===
- Neodesha Township, Wilson County (northeast)
- West Cherry Township, Montgomery County (east)
- Drum Creek Township, Montgomery County (southeast)
- Independence Township, Montgomery County (south)
- Rutland Township, Montgomery County (southwest)
- Louisburg Township, Montgomery County (west)
- Talleyrand Township, Wilson County (northwest)

=== Major highways ===
- US-75
- US-400
