= Louisburg Township, Kansas =

Township in Montgomery County, Kansas, U.S.

Louisburg Township
- Township
- Location within Montgomery County
- Coordinates: 37.32526°N 95.893165°W
- Country: United States
- State: Kansas
- County: Montgomery

Area
  - Total: 72.004 sq mi (186.49 km^{2})
  - Land: 70.979 sq mi (183.83 km^{2})
  - Water: 1.025 sq mi (2.65 km^{2}) 1.42%

Population (2020)
  - Total: 552
  - Density: 7.78/sq mi (3.00/km^{2})
- Time zone: UTC-6 (CST)
  - Summer (DST): UTC-5 (CDT)
- Area code: 620

Louisburg Township is a township in Montgomery County, Kansas, United States. As of the 2020 census, its population was 552.

== Geography ==
Louisburg Township covers an area of 72.004 square miles (186.49 square kilometers). Part of Elk City Lake lies within the township.

=== Communities ===
- Elk City

=== Adjacent townships ===
- Duck Creek Township, Wilson County (north)
- Talleyrand Township, Wilson County (northeast)
- Sycamore Township, Montgomery County (east)
- Independence Township, Montgomery County (southeast)
- Rutland Township, Montgomery County (south)
- Salt Creek Township, Chautauqua County (southwest)
- Oak Valley Township, Elk County (west)

=== Major highways ===
- US-160
