= Rutland Township, Kansas =

Township in Montgomery County, Kansas, U.S.

Rutland Township
- Township
- Location within Montgomery County
- Coordinates: 37.190217°N 95.883048°W
- Country: United States
- State: Kansas
- County: Montgomery

Area
  - Total: 71.987 sq mi (186.45 km^{2})
  - Land: 71.241 sq mi (184.51 km^{2})
  - Water: 0.746 sq mi (1.93 km^{2}) 1.04%

Population (2020)
  - Total: 299
  - Density: 4.20/sq mi (1.62/km^{2})
- Time zone: UTC-6 (CST)
  - Summer (DST): UTC-5 (CDT)
- Area code: 620

Rutland Township is a township in Montgomery County, Kansas, United States. As of the 2020 census, its population was 299.

== History ==
Rutland Township is best known for being a childhood home of Laura Ingalls Wilder and birthplace of her younger sister Carrie Ingalls. The Ingalls family lived in the township from 1869–1871. The land used to belong to the Osage Nation before they were forcibly moved to Oklahoma.

== Geography ==
Rutland Township covers an area of 71.987 square miles (186.45 square kilometers). Part of Elk City Lake lies within the township.

=== Communities ===
- part of Wayside

=== Adjacent townships ===
- Louisburg Township, Montgomery County (north)
- Sycamore Township, Montgomery County (northeast)
- Independence Township, Montgomery County (east)
- Fawn Creek Township, Montgomery County (southeast)
- Caney Township, Montgomery County (south)
- Washington Township, Chautauqua County (southwest)
- Salt Creek Township, Chautauqua County (northwest)

=== Major highways ===
- US-75
- US-160
