= Independence Township, Montgomery County, Kansas =

Township in Montgomery County, Kansas, U.S.

Independence Township
- Township
- Location within Montgomery County
- Coordinates: 37.180761°N 95.752836°W
- Country: United States
- State: Kansas
- County: Montgomery

Area
  - Total: 62.546 sq mi (161.99 km^{2})
  - Land: 60.639 sq mi (157.05 km^{2})
  - Water: 1.907 sq mi (4.94 km^{2}) 3.05%

Population (2020)
  - Total: 2,241
  - Density: 36.96/sq mi (14.27/km^{2})
- Time zone: UTC-6 (CST)
  - Summer (DST): UTC-5 (CDT)
- Area code: 620

Independence Township is a township in Montgomery County, Kansas, United States. As of the 2020 census, its population was 2,241.

== Geography ==
Independence Township covers an area of 62.546 square miles (161.99 square kilometers). Part of Elk City Lake lies within the township, and the Verdigris River flows through it as well. Part of Elk City State Park lies within the township.

=== Adjacent townships ===
- Sycamore Township, Montgomery County (north)
- Drum Creek Township, Montgomery County (northeast)
- Liberty Township, Montgomery County (east)
- Parker Township, Montgomery County (southeast)
- Fawn Creek Township, Montgomery County (south)
- Caney Township, Montgomery County (southwest)
- Rutland Township, Montgomery County (west)
- Louisburg Township, Montgomery County (northwest)

=== Major highways ===
- US-75
- US-160
