= Le Hunt, Kansas =

Ghost town in Montgomery County, Kansas

- Ghost town
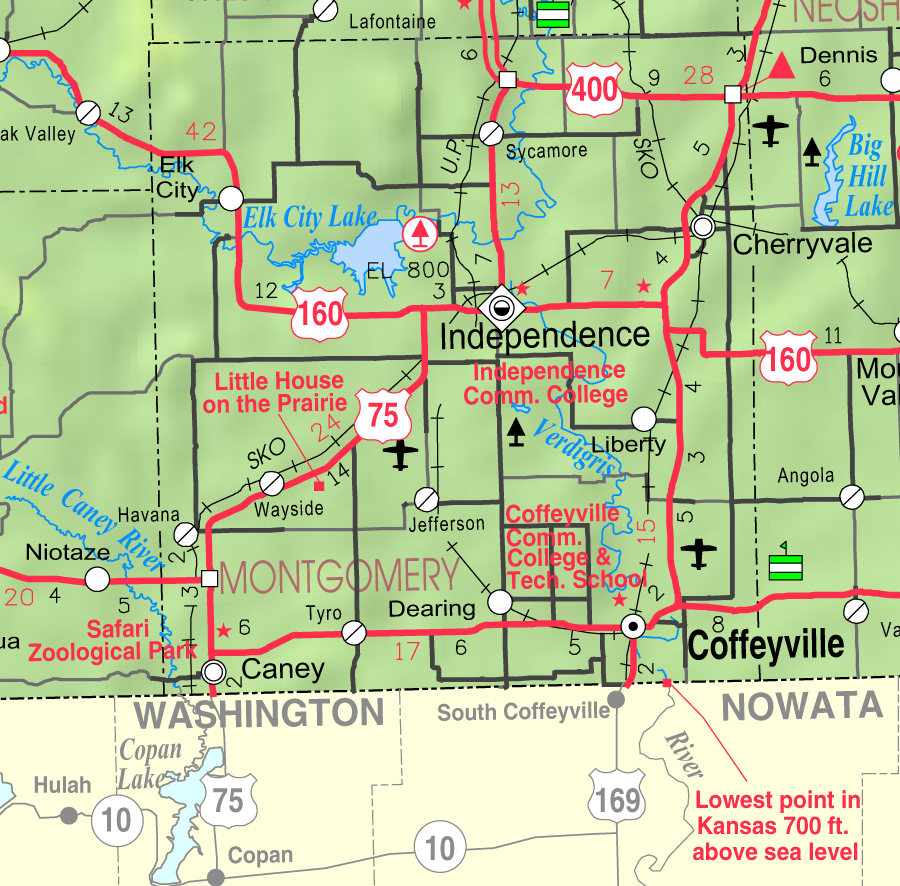
- KDOT map of Montgomery County (legend). Le Hunt is located roughly where the Elk City State Park icon is situated.

- Location within Kansas Location within the United States
- Coordinates: 37°16′9″N 95°45′7″W
- Country: United States
- State: Kansas
- County: Montgomery
- Named for: Leigh Hunt
- Elevation: 801 ft (244 m)

Population
  - Total: 0
- Time zone: UTC-6 (CST)
  - Summer (DST): UTC-5 (CDT)
- Area code: 620
- FIPS code: 20-39275
- GNIS ID: 484489

Le Hunt (sometimes rendered as LeHunt) is a ghost town in Montgomery County, Kansas, United States. While most of the site has been reclaimed by nature, the ruins of the United Kansas Portland Cement Company plant can still be seen in the woods along the eastern shore of Elk City Lake.

== History ==
Le Hunt's origins can be traced to 1905, when the United Kansas Portland Cement Company purchased 1500 acres a few miles northwest of Independence, Kansas and built a large factory. To accommodate the factory's workers, a company town was established by United Kansas Portland Cement Company. The town was named after Leigh Hunt, the president of the Hunt engineering company of Michigan that had constructed the plant. By 1906, the fledgling town had grown to over 1000 people, and around this time, Tom Mix (who would later become a famous American film actor and the star of many early Western movies) served as the town marshal.

After its establishment, the United Kansas Portland Cement Company suffered several years of financial hardship. In 1913, the local newspaper announced that the plant would be temporarily closed to make repairs and sell its surplus stock. By January 1914, the company filed for bankruptcy. In 1915, the plant was purchased by the Sunflower Portland Cement Company. Price fluctuations after World War I caused the Sunflower Portland Cement Company to be purchased in 1918 by its rival, the Western States Portland Cement Company, which after a series of mergers and purchases, became a part of the United States Steel Corporation. This led to the closure of the Le Hunt plant. Its equipment was sold and many of the homes in Le Hunt were moved. With limited housing and no major employer, Le Hunt faded until it was only a derelict ghost town.

The ruins of the cement plant still remain in the woods off County Road 5000. The factory's long-abandoned smoke stack rises prominently above the tree line. According to Legends of America, "While trees and weeds try to choke out where the town's cement plant once stood, the walls, ovens and giant smokestack of the factory are still remarkably intact." Ruins of old houses as well as the settlement's cemetery have largely been reclaimed by nature.
