= Caney Township, Kansas =

Township in Montgomery County, Kansas, U.S.

Caney Township
- Township
- Location within Montgomery County
- Coordinates: 37.059721°N 95.883478°W
- Country: United States
- State: Kansas
- County: Montgomery

Area
  - Total: 68.045 sq mi (176.24 km^{2})
  - Land: 67.434 sq mi (174.65 km^{2})
  - Water: 0.611 sq mi (1.58 km^{2}) 0.90%

Population (2020)
  - Total: 1,134
  - Density: 16.82/sq mi (6.493/km^{2})
- Time zone: UTC-6 (CST)
  - Summer (DST): UTC-5 (CDT)
- Area code: 620

Caney Township is a township in Montgomery County, Kansas, United States. As of the 2020 census, its population was 1,134. It completely surrounds the city of Caney, but the city is independent of the township.

== Geography ==
Caney Township covers an area of 68.045 square miles (176.24 square kilometers). The Caney River flows through it.

=== Communities ===
- Havana
- part of Tyro
- part of Wayside

=== Adjacent townships ===
- Rutland Township, Montgomery County (north)
- Independence Township, Montgomery County (northeast)
- Fawn Creek Township, Montgomery County (east)
- Little Caney Township, Chautauqua County (west)
- Washington Township, Chautauqua County (northwest)

=== Major highways ===
- US-75
- US-166
