= Fawn Creek Township, Kansas =

Township in Montgomery County, Kansas, U.S.

Fawn Creek Township
- Township
- Location within Montgomery County
- Coordinates: 37.057678°N 95.751212°W
- Country: United States
- State: Kansas
- County: Montgomery

Area
  - Total: 68.986 sq mi (178.67 km^{2})
  - Land: 68.943 sq mi (178.56 km^{2})
  - Water: 0.043 sq mi (0.11 km^{2}) 0.06%

Population (2020)
  - Total: 1,857
  - Density: 26.94/sq mi (10.40/km^{2})
- Time zone: UTC-6 (CST)
  - Summer (DST): UTC-5 (CDT)
- Area code: 620

Fawn Creek Township is a township in Montgomery County, Kansas, United States. As of the 2020 census, its population was 1,857.

== Geography ==
Fawn Creek Township covers an area of 68.986 square miles (178.67 square kilometers).

=== Communities ===
- Dearing
- part of Tyro

=== Adjacent townships ===
- Independence Township, Montgomery County (north)
- Liberty Township, Montgomery County (northeast)
- Parker Township, Montgomery County (east)
- Caney Township, Montgomery County (west)
- Rutland Township, Montgomery County (northwest)

=== Major highways ===
- US-166
