= Elk River Archeological District =

Historic district

- U.S. National Register of Historic Places
- Nearest city: Elk City, Kansas
- Area: 14,807 acres (59.92 km^{2})
- NRHP reference No.: 78001279
- Added to NRHP: September 13, 1978

The Elk River Archeological District is a 14,807-acre (59.92 km^{2}) historic district in Elk County, Kansas and Montgomery County, Kansas which includes 69 contributing sites. It was listed on the National Register of Historic Places in 1978 for its information potential.

The district encompasses sites in the Elk River Valley, including the area around Elk City Lake in Elk City. Several of the sites were discovered when the river was dammed to create the lake or in subsequent surveys of the surrounding area. Including sites discovered since 1978, there are now 135 known archaeological sites within the district. The sites represent evidence of continuous human habitation in the Elk River Valley from the Archaic period through the present day, with the earliest sites dating to circa 2000 B.C.
