= Montgomery County, Kansas =

County in Kansas, United States

- County
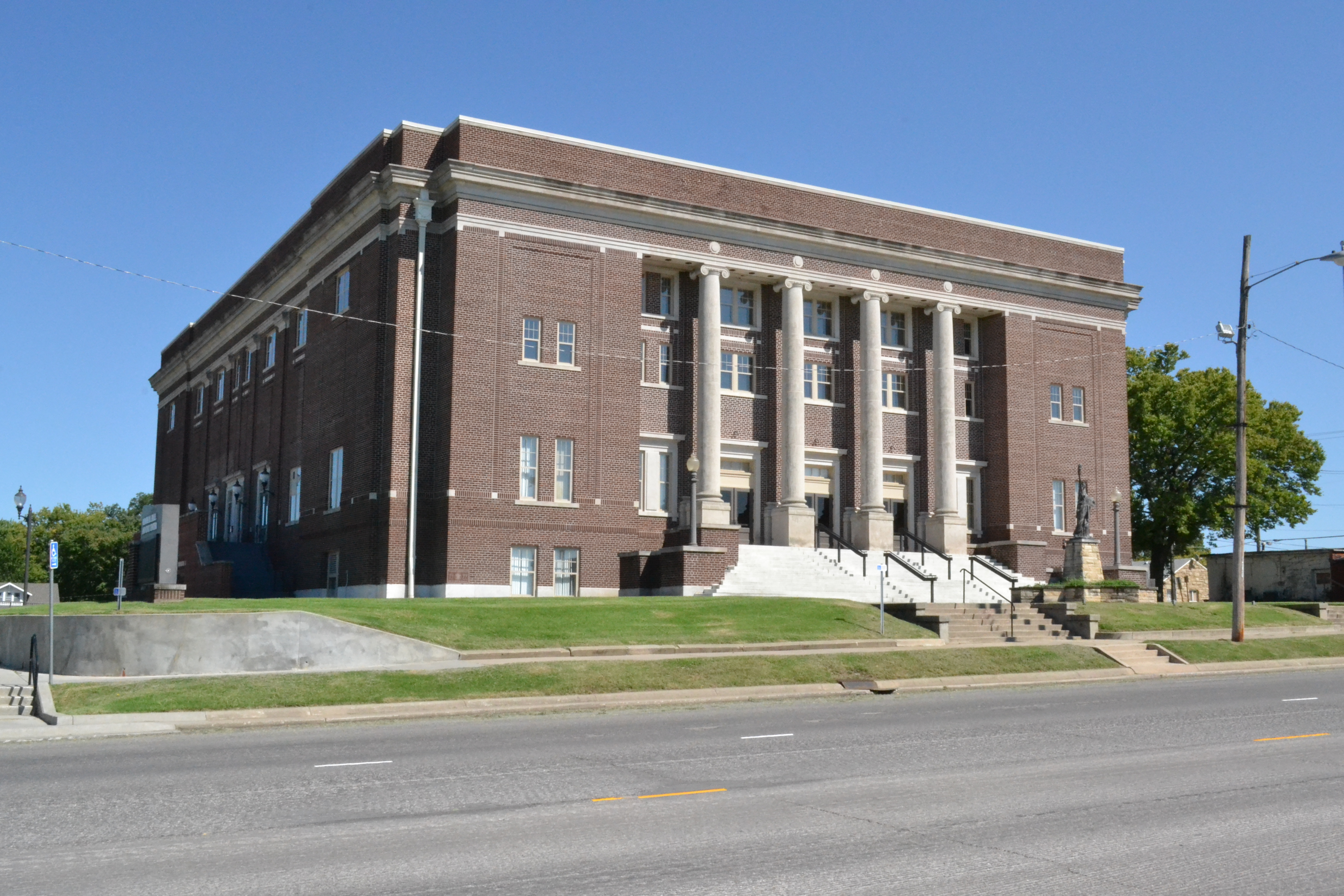
- Memorial Hall in Independence (2017)

- Location within the U.S. state of Kansas
- Coordinates: 37°12′N 95°44′W
- Country: United States
- State: Kansas
- Founded: February 26, 1867
- Named for: Richard Montgomery
- Seat: Independence
- Largest city: Coffeyville

Area
  - Total: 651 sq mi (1,690 km^{2})
  - Land: 644 sq mi (1,670 km^{2})
  - Water: 8.0 sq mi (21 km^{2}) 1.2%

Population (2020)
  - Total: 31,486
  - Estimate (2025): 30,177 ▼
  - Density: 48.9/sq mi (18.9/km^{2})
- Time zone: UTC−6 (Central)
  - Summer (DST): UTC−5 (CDT)
- Area code: 620
- Congressional district: 2nd
- Website: mgcountyks.org

Montgomery County is a county located in Southeast Kansas. Its county seat is Independence, and its most populous city is Coffeyville. As of the 2020 United States census, the county population was 31,486. The county was named after Richard Montgomery, a major general during the American Revolutionary War.

== History ==
=== Early history ===
For many millennia, the Great Plains of North America was inhabited by nomadic Native Americans. From the 16th century to 18th century, the Kingdom of France claimed ownership of large parts of North America. In 1762, after the French and Indian War, France secretly ceded New France to Spain, per the Treaty of Fontainebleau.

=== 19th century ===
In 1802, Spain returned most of the land to France, but kept about 7,500 square miles. In 1803, most of the land of modern day Kansas was acquired by the United States from France as part of the 828,000 square mile Louisiana Purchase for 2.83 cents per acre.

In 1854, the Kansas Territory was organized. In 1861 Kansas became the 34th U.S. state. Montgomery County was established on February 26, 1867. It was named in honor of Richard Montgomery, an American Revolutionary War general killed in 1775 while attempting to capture Quebec City in Canada, after successfully capturing two forts and the city of Montreal.

When Kansas was admitted to the Union as a state in 1861, the Osage Indian reservation occupied a large tract of land near the southern border. The reservation had been established in 1825. After the Civil War, the Osage lands were coveted as the largest and last reserve of good land in the eastern part of the state. As early as 1866, the Osage were forced to cede tracts at the eastern and northern edges of the reservation. This treaty conceded white settlement on land in the eastern part of what became Montgomery County.

For a brief time, the Osage attempted to maintain a boundary at the Verdigris River. The Verdigris flows from north to south through the center of Montgomery County. From the west the Elk River joins the Verdigris at a confluence slightly northwest of the geographical center of the county. In 1867 Frank and Fred Bunker established a primitive cattle camp on the west side of the Verdigris south of the confluence. Like the Osage, the Bunkers thought they were beyond the boundaries of civilization.

Early in 1869, however, settlers began to cross the Verdigris River, "at first under protest of the Indians, but the immense throng of settlers soon made all protests futile." Montgomery County was surveyed and organized in 1869; the governor appointed commissioners June 3.

== Geography ==
According to the U.S. Census Bureau, the county has a total area of 651 square miles (1,690 km^{2}), of which 644 square miles (1,670 km^{2}) is land and 8.0 square miles (21 km^{2}) (1.2%) is water. The lowest point in the state of Kansas is located on the Verdigris River in Cherokee Township in Montgomery County (just southeast of Coffeyville), where it flows out of Kansas and into Oklahoma. Western portions of the county contain parts of the northern Cross Timbers eco-region, which separates the forested eastern portion of the United States with the Plains.

Google Maps uses Fawn Creek Township within Montgomery County as the zero-mile point of the United States. In other words, all directions to the "United States" will lead to a point in Fawn Creek.

=== Adjacent counties ===
- Wilson County (north)
- Neosho County (northeast)
- Labette County (east)
- Nowata County, Oklahoma (southeast)
- Washington County, Oklahoma (south)
- Chautauqua County (west)
- Elk County (northwest)

=== Bodies of water ===
- Elk City Lake
- Elk River
- Havana Lake
- Liberty Lakes
- State Lake
- Verdigris River

=== State parks ===
- Elk City State Park
- Montgomery County State Park

== Demographics ==
Historical population
Census	Pop.	Note	%±
1870	7,564		—
1880	18,213		140.8%
1890	23,104		26.9%
1900	29,039		25.7%
1910	49,474		70.4%
1920	49,645		0.3%
1930	51,411		3.6%
1940	49,729		−3.3%
1950	46,487		−6.5%
1960	45,007		−3.2%
1970	39,949		−11.2%
1980	42,281		5.8%
1990	38,816		−8.2%
2000	36,252		−6.6%
2010	35,471		−2.2%
2020	31,486		−11.2%
2025 (est.)	30,177	▼	−4.2%
U.S. Decennial Census; 1790-1960 1900-1990; 1990-2000 2010-2020

The Coffeyville Micropolitan Statistical Area includes all of Montgomery County.

=== 2020 census ===
As of the 2020 census, the county had a population of 31,486. The median age was 41.1 years. 23.6% of residents were under the age of 18 and 20.8% of residents were 65 years of age or older. For every 100 females there were 98.0 males, and for every 100 females age 18 and over there were 96.5 males age 18 and over. 54.6% of residents lived in urban areas, while 45.4% lived in rural areas.

The racial makeup of the county was 77.2% White, 5.0% Black or African American, 3.2% American Indian and Alaska Native, 0.6% Asian, 0.1% Native Hawaiian and Pacific Islander, 3.0% from some other race, and 10.9% from two or more races. Hispanic or Latino residents of any race comprised 7.7% of the population.

There were 12,968 households in the county, of which 28.2% had children under the age of 18 living with them and 27.3% had a female householder with no spouse or partner present. About 32.1% of all households were made up of individuals and 15.2% had someone living alone who was 65 years of age or older.

There were 15,569 housing units, of which 16.7% were vacant. Among occupied housing units, 69.9% were owner-occupied and 30.1% were renter-occupied. The homeowner vacancy rate was 3.3% and the rental vacancy rate was 14.8%.

=== 2000 census ===
As of the 2000 census, there were 36,252 people, 14,903 households, and 9,955 families residing in the county. The population density was 56 people per square mile (22 people/km^{2}). There were 17,207 housing units at an average density of 27 per square mile (10/km^{2}). The racial makeup of the county was 85.77% White, 6.07% Black or African American, 3.19% Native American, 0.47% Asian, 0.02% Pacific Islander, 1.13% from other races, and 3.34% from two or more races. Hispanic or Latino of any race were 3.08% of the population.

There were 14,903 households, out of which 29.80% had children under the age of 18 living with them, 53.00% were married couples living together, 10.10% had a female householder with no husband present, and 33.20% were non-families. 29.70% of all households were made up of individuals, and 14.70% had someone living alone who was 65 years of age or older. The average household size was 2.37 and the average family size was 2.93.

In the county, the population was spread out, with 25.00% under the age of 18, 8.60% from 18 to 24, 24.70% from 25 to 44, 23.30% from 45 to 64, and 18.30% who were 65 years of age or older. The median age was 39 years. For every 100 females there were 93.20 males. For every 100 females age 18 and over, there were 88.60 males.

The median income for a household in the county was $30,997, and the median income for a family was $38,516. Males had a median income of $29,745 versus $20,179 for females. The per capita income for the county was $16,421. About 9.20% of families and 12.60% of the population were below the poverty line, including 16.80% of those under age 18 and 10.90% of those age 65 or over.

== Government ==
=== Presidential elections ===
Presidential election results

United States presidential election results for Montgomery County, Kansas
Year	Republican		Democratic		Third party(ies)	
Year	No.	%	No.	%	No.	%
1888	2,871	52.43%	1,863	34.02%	742	13.55%
1892	2,736	51.83%	0	0.00%	2,543	48.17%
1896	2,714	46.05%	3,132	53.14%	48	0.81%
1900	3,433	51.28%	3,213	48.00%	48	0.72%
1904	4,997	64.91%	2,091	27.16%	610	7.92%
1908	5,166	52.10%	4,030	40.64%	720	7.26%
1912	1,842	20.53%	3,011	33.56%	4,118	45.90%
1916	6,371	41.45%	8,059	52.44%	939	6.11%
1920	10,044	62.21%	5,657	35.04%	444	2.75%
1924	11,160	65.02%	4,178	24.34%	1,825	10.63%
1928	14,316	76.31%	4,205	22.41%	239	1.27%
1932	9,958	48.96%	9,941	48.88%	440	2.16%
1936	11,565	49.92%	11,535	49.79%	67	0.29%
1940	13,781	57.68%	9,999	41.85%	114	0.48%
1944	11,738	62.29%	7,063	37.48%	43	0.23%
1948	10,636	54.70%	8,621	44.34%	187	0.96%
1952	14,261	64.62%	7,679	34.79%	130	0.59%
1956	13,252	64.34%	7,265	35.27%	81	0.39%
1960	12,536	60.74%	7,938	38.46%	164	0.79%
1964	8,437	48.44%	8,853	50.83%	126	0.72%
1968	9,697	55.77%	5,210	29.97%	2,479	14.26%
1972	11,717	73.66%	3,685	23.17%	505	3.17%
1976	8,864	54.08%	7,157	43.66%	370	2.26%
1980	10,856	64.18%	5,282	31.23%	777	4.59%
1984	12,023	70.20%	4,933	28.80%	171	1.00%
1988	9,067	61.98%	5,429	37.11%	132	0.90%
1992	6,848	43.04%	5,453	34.27%	3,611	22.69%
1996	7,428	51.71%	5,269	36.68%	1,668	11.61%
2000	8,496	61.81%	4,770	34.70%	479	3.48%
2004	9,598	67.99%	4,338	30.73%	180	1.28%
2008	9,309	66.94%	4,338	31.19%	260	1.87%
2012	8,630	69.50%	3,501	28.20%	286	2.30%
2016	8,679	72.30%	2,637	21.97%	688	5.73%
2020	9,931	73.97%	3,228	24.04%	267	1.99%
2024	9,287	74.65%	2,934	23.58%	220	1.77%

Like almost all of Kansas, Montgomery County votes predominantly Republican. Since 1920, the only Democrat to carry the county has been Lyndon B. Johnson in 1964, and even then by only 16 votes. However, Alf Landon, in the landslide loss of 1936, won his home county by only thirty votes, whilst Herbert Hoover won the county in 1932 by only seventeen votes out of over nineteen thousand cast.

=== Laws ===
Following amendment to the Kansas Constitution in 1986, the county remained a prohibition, or "dry", county until 1998, when voters approved the sale of alcoholic liquor by the individual drink without a food sales requirement.

=== Media with office hours in Montgomery County, Kansas ===
The Good News
Independence Daily Reporter
Montgomery County Chronicle
The Coffeyville Journal
Parsons Sun
Chanute Tribune

KGGF-AM
KIND-AM
KUSN-FM
KQQF-FM
KGGF Classic Hits - FM
My FM 94.9 Kind

== Transportation ==
=== Major highways ===
- U.S. Route 75
- U.S. Route 160
- U.S. Route 166
- U.S. Route 169
- U.S. Route 400

=== Airports ===
- Coffeyville Municipal Airport
- Independence Municipal Airport

=== Bus ===
- Jefferson Lines in Coffeyville

== Education ==
=== Colleges ===
- Coffeyville Community College
- Independence Community College

=== Unified school districts ===
- Caney Valley USD 436
- Coffeyville USD 445
- Independence USD 446
- Cherryvale USD 447
- Elk Valley USD 283

== Communities ==
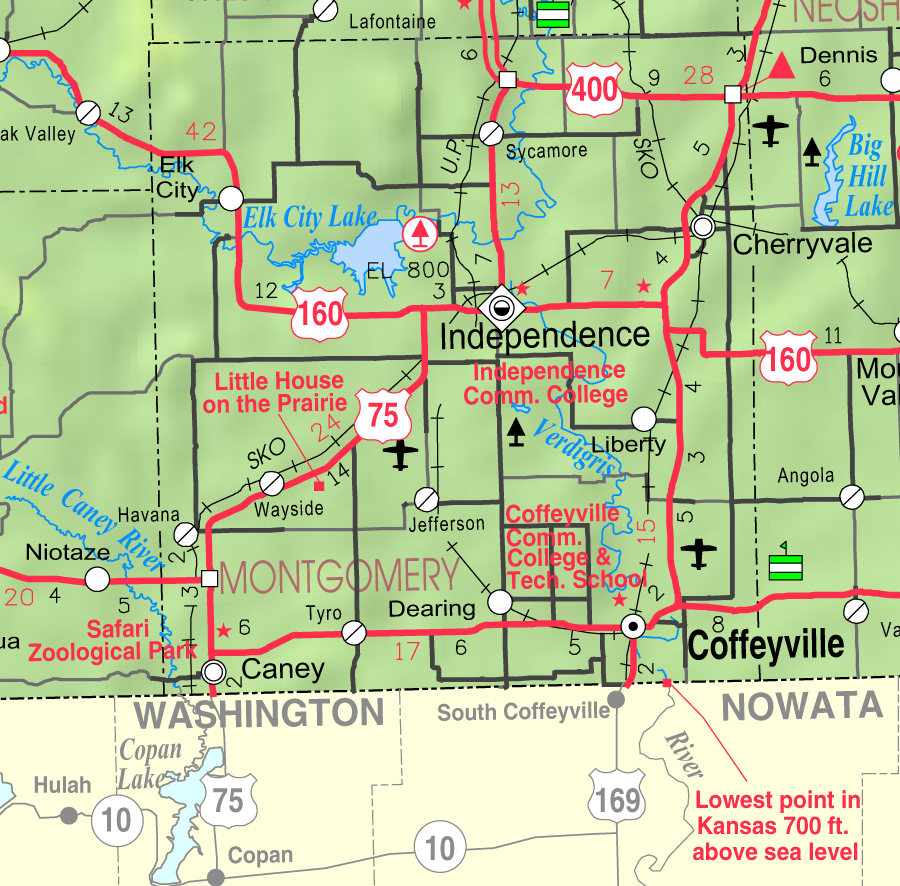
2005 map of Montgomery County (map legend)

List of townships / incorporated cities / unincorporated communities / extinct former communities within Montgomery County.

=== Cities ===
- Caney
- Cherryvale
- Coffeyville
- Dearing
- Elk City
- Havana
- Independence (county seat)
- Liberty
- Tyro

=== Unincorporated communities ===
† means a community is designated a Census-Designated Place (CDP) by the United States Census Bureau.

- Avian
- Blake
- Bolton
- Corbin
- Jefferson
- Sycamore†
- Videtta Spur
- Wayside†

=== Ghost towns ===
- Le Hunt

=== Townships ===
Montgomery County is divided into twelve townships. The cities of Caney, Cherryvale, Coffeyville, and Independence are considered governmentally independent and are excluded from the census figures for the townships. In the following table, the population center is the largest city (or cities) included in that township's population total, if it is of a significant size.

Township	FIPS	Population center	Population	Population density /km^{2} (/sq mi)	Land area km^{2} (sq mi)	Water area km^{2} (sq mi)	Water %	Geographic coordinates
Caney	10400		1,244	7 (18)	176 (68)	1 (0)	0.30%	37°3′44″N 95°54′12″W
Cherokee	12850		541	5 (14)	100 (39)	0 (0)	0%	37°3′40″N 95°34′50″W
Cherry	12875		517	5 (13)	103 (40)	0 (0)	0.10%	37°19′12″N 95°33′57″W
Drum Creek	18700		537	6 (15)	92 (35)	0 (0)	0.15%	37°13′31″N 95°36′17″W
Fawn Creek	23325		2,036	11 (30)	179 (69)	0 (0)	0.06%	37°3′22″N 95°44′7″W
Independence	33900		2,342	14 (37)	163 (63)	5 (2)	2.85%	37°11′22″N 95°44′31″W
Liberty	40275		473	4 (11)	113 (44)	0 (0)	0.19%	37°9′32″N 95°35′59″W
Louisburg	42900		629	3 (9)	185 (71)	1 (1)	0.75%	37°18′25″N 95°53′56″W
Parker	54525		1,212	18 (47)	66 (26)	0 (0)	0.37%	37°3′19″N 95°37′55″W
Rutland	61925		302	2 (4)	185 (71)	2 (1)	0.86%	37°11′25″N 95°52′59″W
Sycamore	69750		835	5 (13)	169 (65)	7 (3)	3.86%	37°18′28″N 95°44′53″W
West Cherry	76825		239	2 (6)	102 (39)	0 (0)	0.05%	37°18′29″N 95°38′54″W
Sources: "Census 2000 U.S. Gazetteer Files". U.S. Census Bureau, Geography Division. Archived from the original on August 2, 2002.

Population estimates for Montgomery County both townships (displayed first) and Cities (displayed second): 2024* (2022**, 2023***), not actual headcount, per Montgomery County Chronicle July 10, 2025 (as certified by the Kansas Division of Budget as of July 1, 2025)

Caney township: 924* (938**, 927***)

Caney proper: 1,726* (1,759** 1,732***)

Cherokee township: 400* (404**, 400***)

Cherry township: 458* (464**, 457***)

West Cherry township: 267* (271**, 266***)

Cherryvale proper: 2,114* (2,157**, 2,128***)

Coffeyville proper: 8,525* (8,690**, 8,570**)

Dearing proper: 372* (377**, 373***)

Drum Creek township: 480* (490**, 483***)

Elk City proper: 250* (257**, 254***)

Fawn Creek township: 1,351* (1,372**, 1,353***)

Havana proper: 83* (82**, 81***)

Independence township: 2,181* (2,224**, 2,198***)

Independence proper: 8,287* (8,436**, 8,315***)

Liberty township: 371* (380**, 374***)

Liberty proper: 95* (99**, 95***)

Louisburg township: 275* (279**, 275***)

Parker township: 1,061* (1,074**, 1,060**)

Rutland township: 259* (263**, 260**)

Sycamore township: 791* (806**, 795***)

Tyro proper: 169* (174**, 172***)

* =July 1, 2025

**=July 1, 2023

***=July 1, 2024

== See also ==
- National Register of Historic Places listings in Montgomery County, Kansas

Community information for Kansas

- Kansas locations by per capita income
- List of counties in Kansas
- List of townships in Kansas
- List of cities in Kansas
- List of unincorporated communities in Kansas
- List of ghost towns in Kansas
