= Jefferson, Kansas =

Unincorporated community in Montgomery County, Kansas

- Unincorporated community
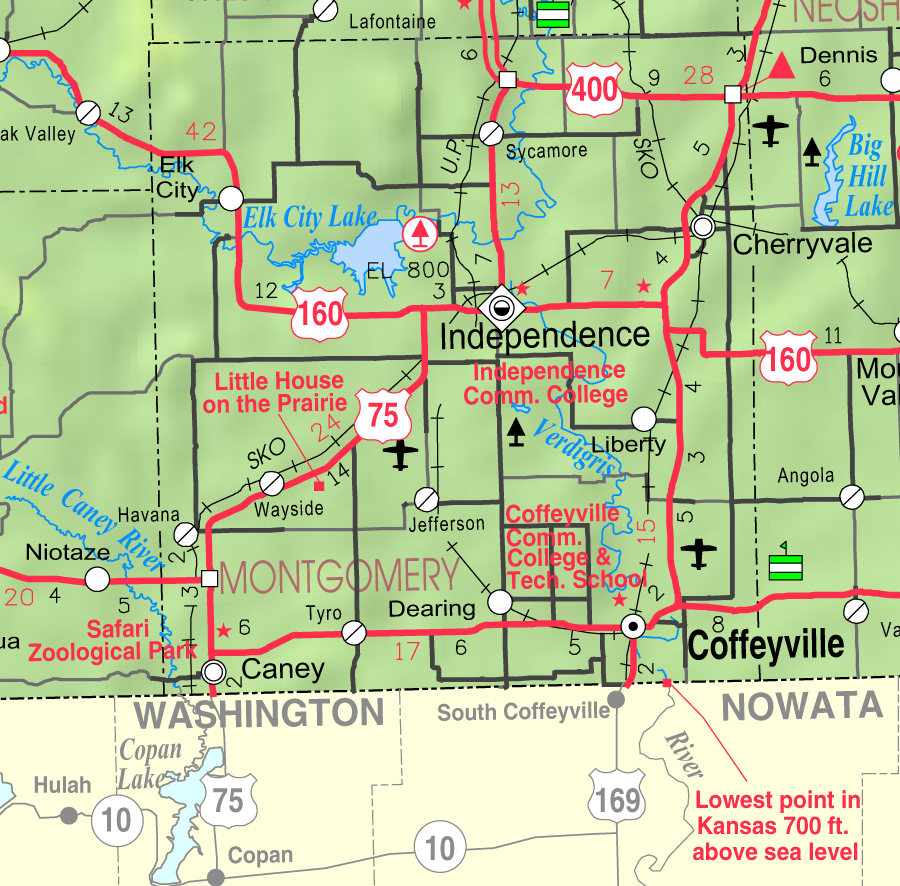
- KDOT map of Montgomery County (legend)

- Location within Kansas Location within the United States
- Country: United States
- State: Kansas
- County: Montgomery
- Founded: 1886
- Platted: 1886
- Named for: Albert Jefferson Broadbent
- Elevation: 807 ft (246 m)
- Time zone: UTC-6 (CST)
  - Summer (DST): UTC-5 (CDT)
- Area code: 620
- FIPS code: 20-35275
- GNIS ID: 469241

Jefferson is an unincorporated community in Montgomery County, Kansas, United States.

== History ==
Jefferson was laid out in 1886 when the railroad was extended to that point. It was named for Albert Jefferson Broadbent, the original owner of the town site.

A post office was opened in Jefferson in 1888, and remained in operation until it was discontinued in 1954.

Currently, only a small general store is located here, and less than a dozen houses. Nearby is a guest ranch with an RV park.
