= Liberty, Kansas =

City in Montgomery County, Kansas

- City
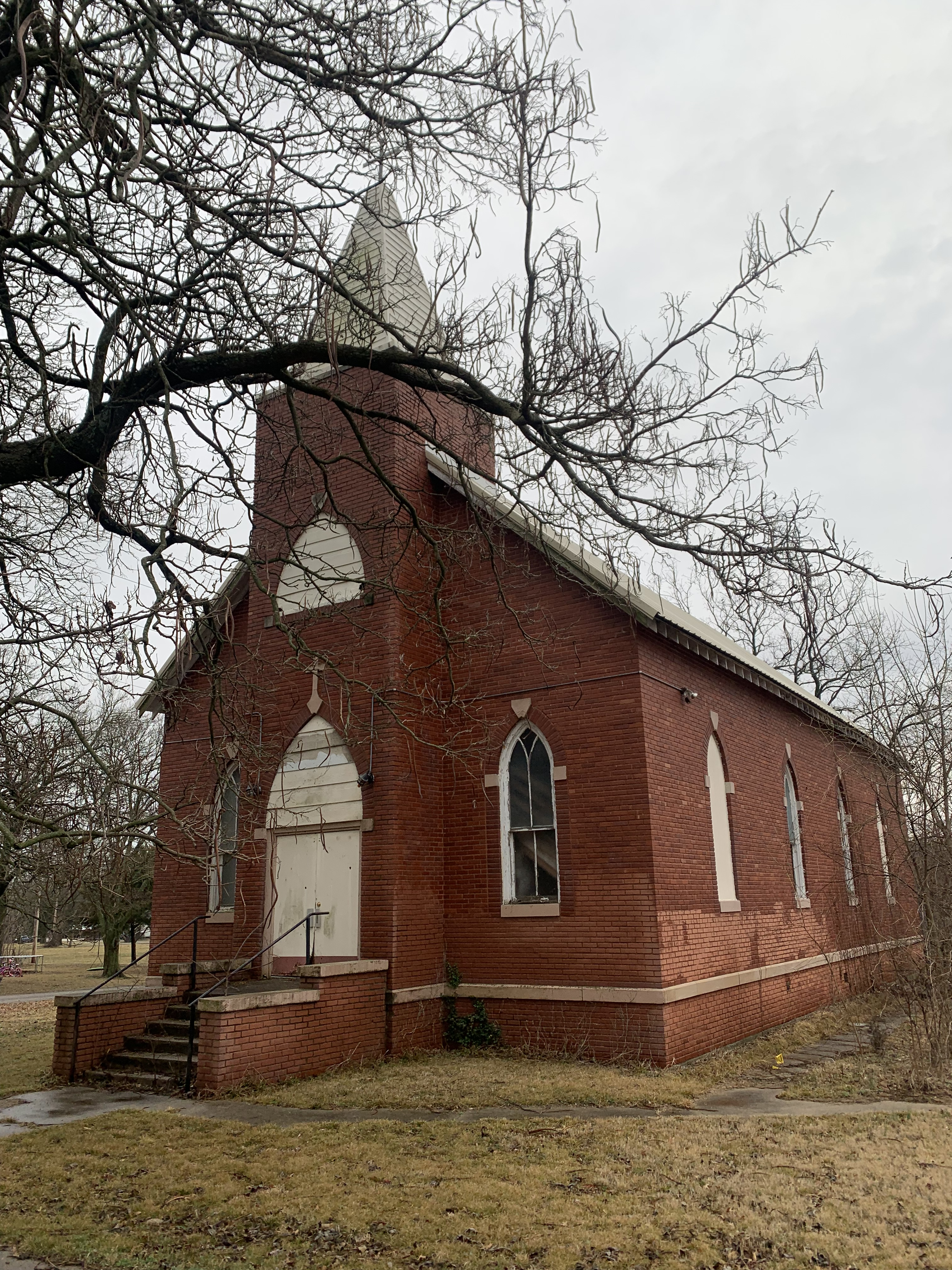
- Historic Church in Liberty (2026)

- Location within Montgomery County and Kansas

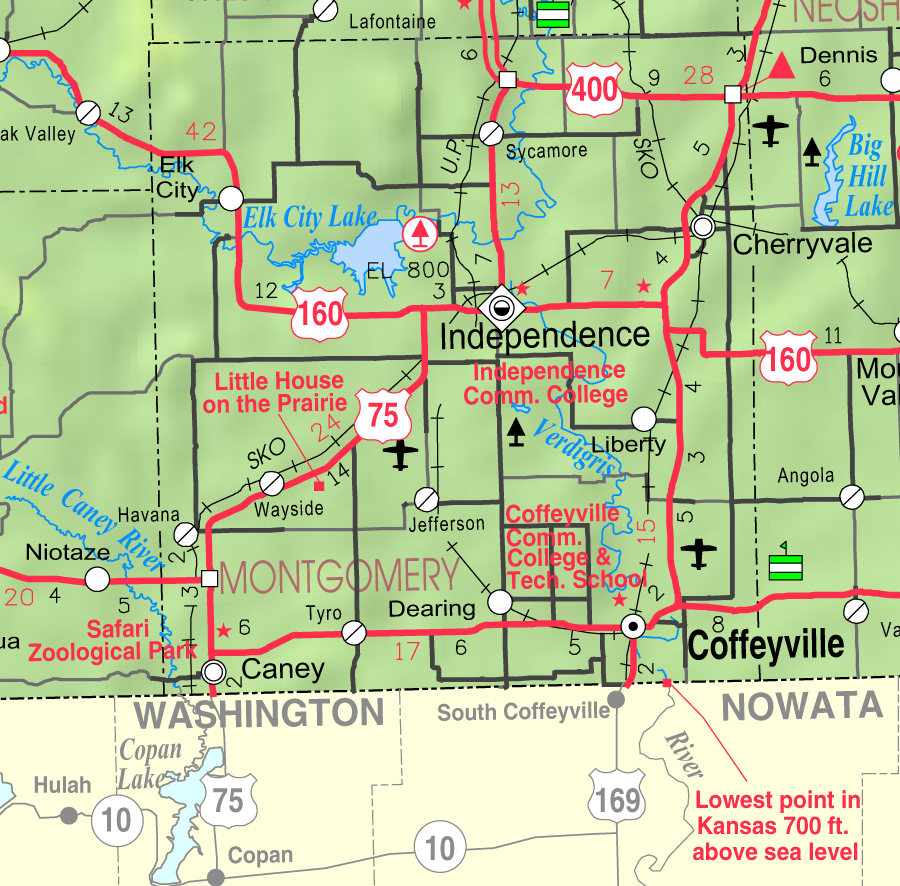
- KDOT map of Montgomery County (legend)
- Coordinates: 37°09′23″N 95°35′52″W
- Country: United States
- State: Kansas
- County: Montgomery
- Founded: 1869
- Platted: 1869
- Incorporated: 1884

Area
  - Total: 0.25 sq mi (0.65 km^{2})
  - Land: 0.25 sq mi (0.65 km^{2})
  - Water: 0 sq mi (0.00 km^{2})
- Elevation: 755 ft (230 m)

Population (2020)
  - Total: 99
  - Density: 390/sq mi (150/km^{2})
- Time zone: UTC-6 (CST)
  - Summer (DST): UTC-5 (CDT)
- ZIP Code: 67351
- Area code: 620
- FIPS code: 20-40250
- GNIS ID: 2395701

Liberty is a city in Montgomery County, Kansas, United States. As of the 2020 census, the population of the city was 99.

== History ==
Liberty was laid out in 1869 about six miles southeast of Independence, Kansas. It is named for the popular American ideal of liberty. When the railroad was built through the county in 1870, Liberty relocated to its present site. The first post office in Liberty was established in May 1870.

== Geography ==
According to the United States Census Bureau, the city has a total area of 0.26 square miles (0.67 km^{2}), all land.

=== Climate ===
The climate in this area is characterized by hot, humid summers and generally mild to cool winters. According to the Köppen Climate Classification system, Liberty has a humid subtropical climate, abbreviated "Cfa" on climate maps.

== Demographics ==
Historical population
Census	Pop.	Note	%±
1880	93		—
1890	344		269.9%
1900	314		−8.7%
1910	385		22.6%
1920	247		−35.8%
1930	246		−0.4%
1940	254		3.3%
1950	185		−27.2%
1960	233		25.9%
1970	185		−20.6%
1980	174		−5.9%
1990	140		−19.5%
2000	95		−32.1%
2010	123		29.5%
2020	99		−19.5%
U.S. Decennial Census

=== 2020 census ===
The 2020 United States census counted 99 people, 46 households, and 30 families in Liberty. The population density was 394.4 per square mile (152.3/km^{2}). There were 55 housing units at an average density of 219.1 per square mile (84.6/km^{2}). The racial makeup was 80.81% (80) white or European American (77.78% non-Hispanic white), 0.0% (0) black or African-American, 0.0% (0) Native American or Alaska Native, 0.0% (0) Asian, 0.0% (0) Pacific Islander or Native Hawaiian, 0.0% (0) from other races, and 19.19% (19) from two or more races. Hispanic or Latino of any race was 3.03% (3) of the population.

Of the 46 households, 34.8% (16 households) had children under the age of 18; 43.5% (20 households) were married couples living together; 32.6% (15 households) had a female householder with no spouse or partner present. 28.3% (13 households) consisted of individuals and 17.4% (8 households) had someone living alone who was 65 years of age or older. The average household size was 1.7 and the average family size was 2.5. The percent of those with a bachelor's degree or higher was estimated to be 0.0% of the population.

28.3% of the population was under the age of 18, 3.0% from 18 to 24, 28.3% from 25 to 44, 23.2% from 45 to 64, and 17.2% who were 65 years of age or older. The median age was 38.1 years. For every 100 females, there were 90.4 males. For every 100 females ages 18 and older, there were 102.9 males.

The 2016–2020 5-year American Community Survey estimates show that the median household income was $65,556 (with a margin of error of +/- $38,298). Females had a median income of $27,083 (+/- $12,192). The median income for those above 16 years old was $38,500 (+/- $20,231). Approximately, 15.4% of families and 19.2% of the population were below the poverty line, including 33.3% of those under the age of 18 and 25.0% of those ages 65 or over.

=== 2010 census ===
As of the census of 2010, there were 123 people, 58 households, and 36 families residing in the city. The population density was 473.1 inhabitants per square mile (182.7/km^{2}). There were 69 housing units at an average density of 265.4 per square mile (102.5/km^{2}). The racial makeup of the city was 91.1% White, 1.6% Native American, and 7.3% from two or more races. Hispanic or Latino of any race were 1.6% of the population.

There were 58 households, of which 27.6% had children under the age of 18 living with them, 48.3% were married couples living together, 8.6% had a female householder with no husband present, 5.2% had a male householder with no wife present, and 37.9% were non-families. 36.2% of all households were made up of individuals, and 15.5% had someone living alone who was 65 years of age or older. The average household size was 2.12 and the average family size was 2.72.

The median age in the city was 41.5 years. 23.6% of residents were under the age of 18; 6.5% were between the ages of 18 and 24; 22% were from 25 to 44; 30.1% were from 45 to 64; and 17.9% were 65 years of age or older. The gender makeup of the city was 50.4% male and 49.6% female.

=== 2000 census ===
As of the census of 2000, there were 95 people, 50 households, and 29 families residing in the city. The population density was 369.0 inhabitants per square mile (142.5/km^{2}). There were 62 housing units at an average density of 240.8 per square mile (93.0/km^{2}). The racial makeup of the city was 85.26% White, 1.05% African American, 8.42% Native American, and 5.26% from two or more races.

There were 50 households, out of which 18.0% had children under the age of 18 living with them, 48.0% were married couples living together, 10.0% had a female householder with no husband present, and 42.0% were non-families. 40.0% of all households were made up of individuals, and 18.0% had someone living alone who was 65 years of age or older. The average household size was 1.90 and the average family size was 2.52.

In the city, the population was spread out, with 15.8% under the age of 18, 8.4% from 18 to 24, 22.1% from 25 to 44, 30.5% from 45 to 64, and 23.2% who were 65 years of age or older. The median age was 46 years. For every 100 females, there were 102.1 males. For every 100 females age 18 and over, there were 105.1 males.

The median income for a household in the city was $23,750, and the median income for a family was $32,500. Males had a median income of $26,667 versus $19,375 for females. The per capita income for the city was $14,917. There were 9.4% of families and 13.5% of the population living below the poverty line, including 33.3% of under eighteens and 8.3% of those over 64.

== Education ==
The community is served by Coffeyville USD 445 public school district.

== In film ==
The Wes Anderson film The French Dispatch (2021) references and has scenes that takes place in the town, although not filmed on location. The character Arthur Howitzer Jr., played by Bill Murray, was from Liberty.
