= Sycamore, Kansas =

Unincorporated community in Montgomery County, Kansas

- CDP
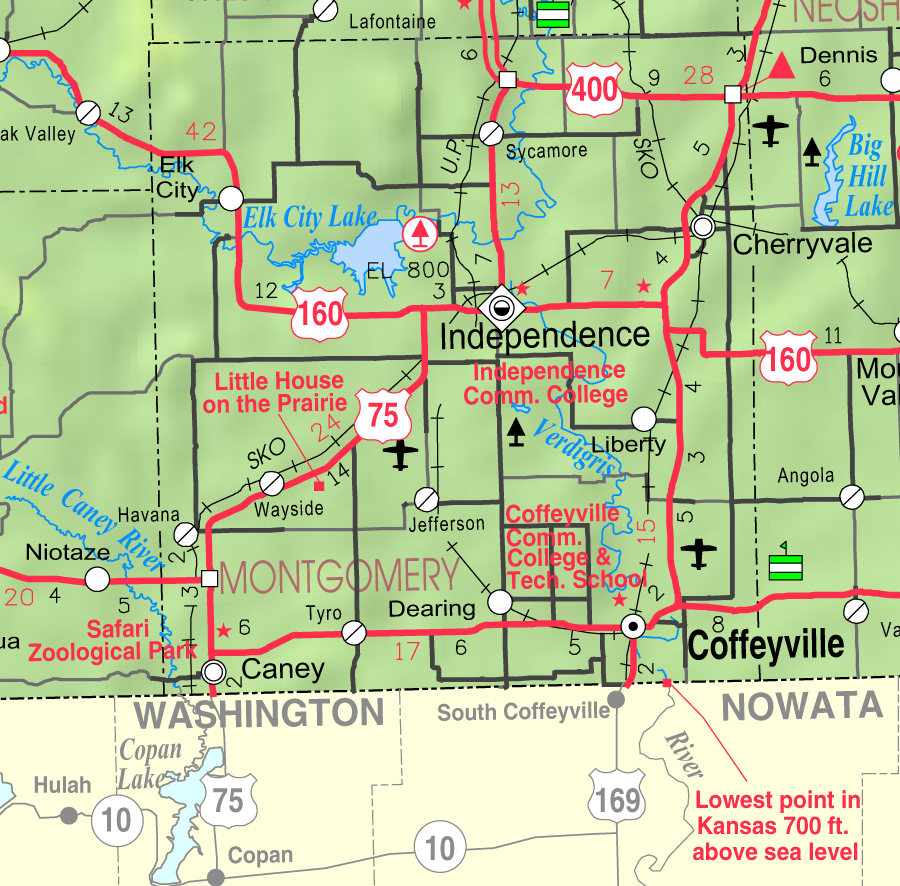
- KDOT map of Montgomery County (legend)

- Location within Kansas Location within the United States
- Coordinates: 37°19′29″N 95°42′55″W
- Country: United States
- State: Kansas
- County: Montgomery
- Elevation: 840 ft (260 m)

Population (2020)
  - Total: 70
- Time zone: UTC-6 (CST)
  - Summer (DST): UTC-5 (CDT)
- ZIP Code: 67363
- Area code: 620
- FIPS code: 20-69725
- GNIS ID: 2804501

Sycamore is a census-designated place (CDP) in northern Montgomery County, Kansas, United States. As of the 2020 census, the population was 70. It is located along U.S. Route 75, north of the city of Independence.

== History ==
Sycamore was founded when the railroad was first built through the area.

The post office, established as Lay in 1887, was renamed Sycamore in 1896. It has a post office with the ZIP Code 67363.

== Climate ==
The climate in this area is characterized by hot, humid summers and generally mild to cool winters. According to the Köppen Climate Classification system, Sycamore has a humid subtropical climate, abbreviated "Cfa" on climate maps.

== Demographics ==
Historical population
Census	Pop.	Note	%±
2020	70		—
U.S. Decennial Census

== Education ==
The community is served by Independence USD 446 public school district.
