= Coffeyville Municipal Airport =

Airport in Kansas, United States

Coffeyville Municipal Airport Coffeyville AAF
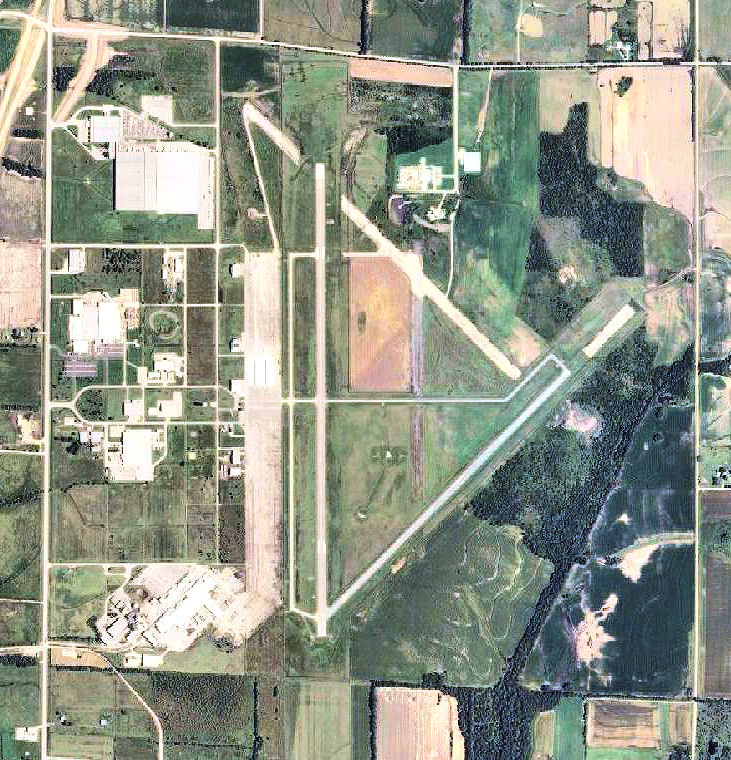
- 2008 USGS airphoto
- IATA: CFV; ICAO: KCFV; FAA LID: CFV

Summary
- Airport type: Public
- Owner: City of Coffeyville
- Serves: Coffeyville, Kansas
- Location: Cherokee Township, Montgomery County, near Coffeyville, Kansas
- Elevation AMSL: 754 ft (230 m)
- Coordinates: 37°05′39″N 095°34′19″W

Map
- Location within Kansas

Runways
Direction	Length		Surface
Direction	ft	m	Surface
17/35	5,872	1,790	Asphalt
4/22	4,000	1,219	Asphalt

Statistics (2005)
- Aircraft operations: 5,550
- Based aircraft: 40
- Source: Federal Aviation Administration

Coffeyville Municipal Airport (IATA: CFV, ICAO: KCFV, FAA LID: CFV) is a city-owned public-use airport four miles northeast of Coffeyville, in Montgomery County, Kansas, United States.

== Facilities ==
The airport covers 1,227 acres (497 ha) and has two asphalt runways: 17/35 is 5,872 x 100 ft (1,790 x 30 m) and 4/22 is 4,000 x 75 ft (1,219 x 23 m).

For the 12-month period ending September 19, 2005 the airport had 5,550 aircraft operations, average 15 per day: 99% general aviation and 1% military. 40 aircraft were then based at the airport: 85% single-engine, 10% multi-engine and 5% ultralight.

== History ==
For the World War II use of the airport, see Coffeyville Army Airfield

During World War II the facility was Coffeyville Army Airfield. It was a United States Army Air Forces AAF Flying Training Command training field from 1942 to 1945.

Aircraft used were Vultee BT-13A Valiants and BT-15s. The airfield performed Basic Pilot School instruction, the second phase of the three-phase training program for pilots. The facility was closed and turned over to civil authorities in 1947.

From 1951 to 1954 Ozark Airlines DC-3s between Tulsa and Kansas City stopped at Coffeyville; the airport was then called McGugin Field. National Air Transport's timetable showed a stop at Coffeyville in the 1930s, but that was an earlier airport.

In the 1950s Continental Can Company leased the hangars at the airport and was a subcontractor for Boeing Corporation, building bomb bay doors for B-52 Stratofortresses. This ended in 1958 with the completion of the B-52 contract. Coffeyville had been an industrious small city; this plant closing along with the closing of other industries was a severe blow to Coffeyville's financial health.

In its heyday Coffeyville had a dairy, Page Milk Company; an oilfield drilling rig company, Parkersburg; two railroad yards and maintenance operations, ATSF & Katy; a brick company and terra cotta roofing tile company, Ludowici-Celadon; a cast iron casting company; and a large oil refinery, Co-Op. On the northwest outskirts was a large smelter. Except for the oil refinery, which has a small operation today, all industries are gone.

== See also ==
- List of airports in Kansas
