= Booth Hotel =

- U.S. National Register of Historic Places
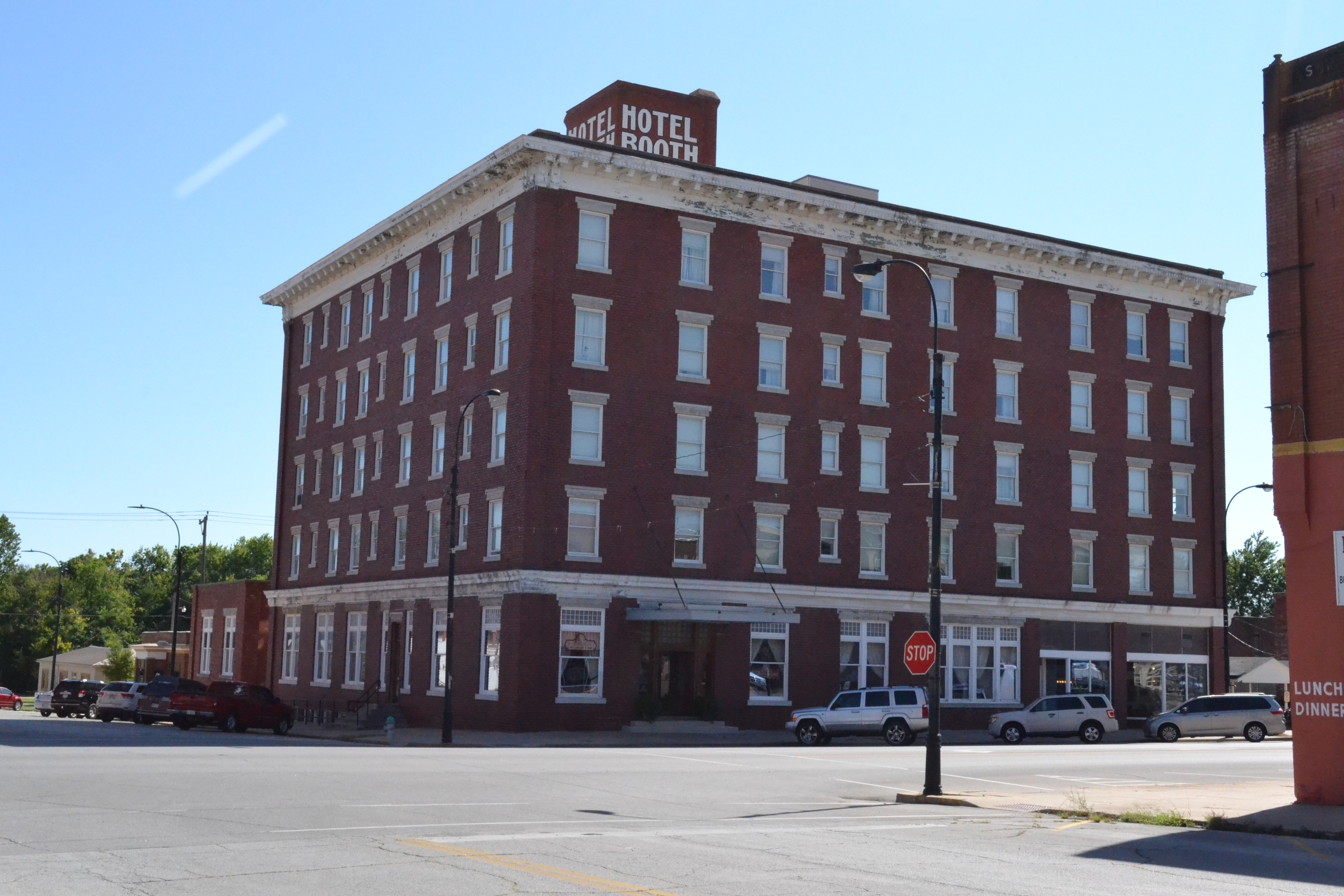

- Location within Kansas Location within the United States
- Location: 201-209 W. Main St., Independence, Kansas
- Coordinates: 37°13′23″N 95°42′30″W
- Area: less than one acre
- Built: 1911
- Architect: Frank Bender
- NRHP reference No.: 83000435
- Added to NRHP: April 28, 1983

The Booth Hotel located on W. Main St. in Independence, Kansas was built in 1911. It was listed on the National Register of Historic Places in 1983.

It is a 91 by 111 feet (28 m × 34 m) U-shaped hotel built of reinforced concrete and brick, and was designed to be fireproof. It initially had 108 rooms, including 25 with private bathrooms.

== History ==
In 1870, Thomas J. Booth came to Montgomery County. His education primarily consisted of common schooling in Kansas and Iowa, followed by a career as a cattle buyer and shipper. But it was oil and gas business in which he made conservative and profitable investments. The 108-room project of Booth Hotel was completed on January 1, 1912, after construction began early in 1911.

In the 1960s, the Hotel Booth closed and sat empty for almost two decades. The building was purchased by a company to keep it from being demolished and spent nearly six million dollars on renovations. David and Linda Grice purchased the Booth in December 2007. It has since been restored to its former grandeur after being lightly renovated.
