= Coffeyville USD 445 =

Public school district in Coffeyville, Kansas

Address
- 615 S. Ellis St. Coffeyville, Kansas, 67337; United States

District information
- Type: Public
- Grades: PreK to 12

Other information
- Website: cvilleschools.com

Field Kindley High School

Location
- 1110 West Eighth Street; Coffeyville, (Montgomery County), Kansas 67337; United States

Information
- Type: Public high school
- Principal: Travis Stalford
- Staff: 32.10 (FTE)
- Enrollment: 454 (2023-24)
- Student to teacher ratio: 14.14
- Colors: Purple and gold
- Nickname: Golden Tornado
- Website: Field Kindley High School

Coffeyville USD 445 is a public unified school district headquartered in Coffeyville, Kansas, United States. The district includes the communities of Coffeyville, Dearing, Liberty, and nearby rural areas.

== Schools ==
The school district operates the following schools:

- Field Kindley High School
- Roosevelt Middle School
- Community Elementary School
- Dr. Jerry Hamm Early Learning Center

=== Former schools ===
The following schools were closed after the 2003-4 school year.

- Garfield Elementary School
- Edgewood Elementary School
- Whittier Elementary School
- Longfellow Elementary School

== See also ==
- Kansas State Department of Education
- Kansas State High School Activities Association
- List of high schools in Kansas
- List of unified school districts in Kansas
