= Elk City State Park =

State park in Kansas, United States

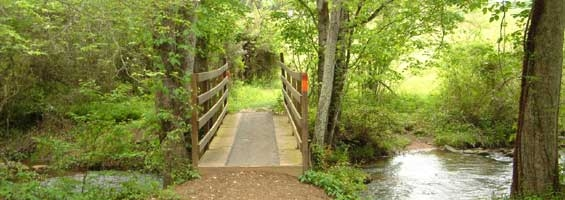

- Location within Kansas Location within the United States
- Interactive map of Elk City State Park
- Location: Montgomery County, Kansas, United States
- Coordinates: 37°15′20″N 95°46′16″W
- Area: 857 acres (347 ha)
- Elevation: 833 ft (254 m)
- Established: 1967
- Administrator: Kansas Department of Wildlife and Parks
- Visitors: 282,360 (in 2022)
- Website: Official website
- Kansas State Parks

Elk City State Park is a state park in Montgomery County, Kansas, United States, located west of Independence. The 857-acre (347 ha) park is adjacent to the 4,500-acre (1,800 ha) Elk City Reservoir and the 12,000-acre (4,900 ha) Elk City Wildlife Area. The reservoir offers fishing opportunities for channel catfish, white bass, crappie, flathead catfish, largemouth bass and saugeye. The wildlife area offers a chance to view white-tailed deer, wild turkey, bobwhite quail, cottontail, gray squirrel, prairie chicken, beaver, raccoon, bobcat, coyote, gray fox, opossum, mink and muskrat.

== Trails ==
The Green Thumb Nature Trail at the Timber Road campground is a one-mile loop with a panoramic vista of the lake. The nearby Table Mound Hiking Trail runs 2.75 miles (4.43 km) north along the east side of the lake to the scenic overlook at the dam. At the overlook is the 2/3-mile Post Oak Nature Trail. There is also a paved and handicapped accessible 3.3-mile (5.3 km) South Squaw Multipurpose trail. Running outside of the park is the Elk River Hiking Trail, a scenic 15-mile (24 km) route that begins at the west edge of the dam and ends near the U.S. Route 160 bridge on the Elk River.

== See also ==
- List of lakes, reservoirs, and dams in Kansas
- List of rivers of Kansas
