= Union Implement and Hardware Building-Masonic Temple =

- Union Implement and Hardware Building--Masonic Temple
- U.S. National Register of Historic Places
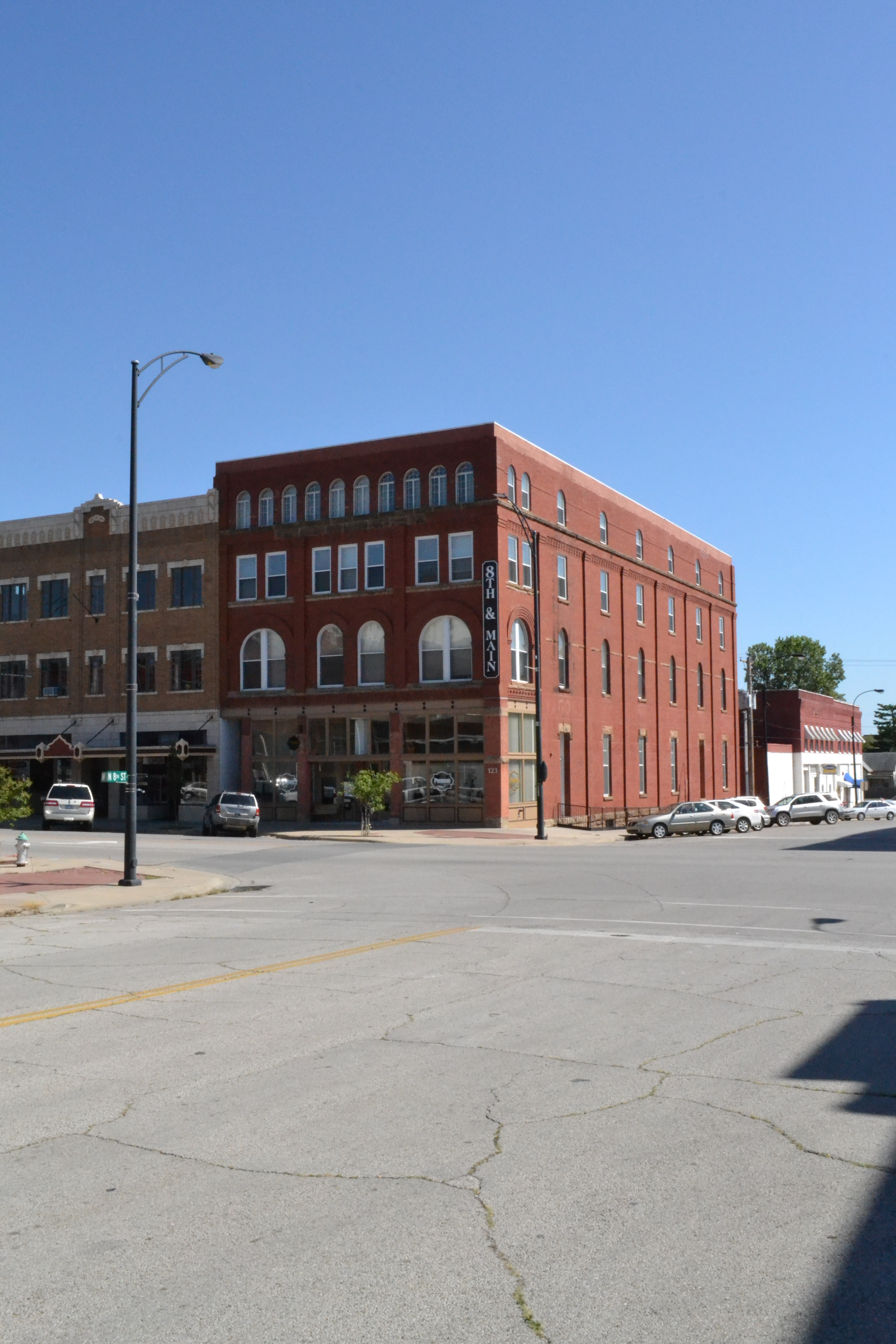

- Location within Kansas Location within the United States
- Location: 121-123 W. Main, Independence, Kansas
- Coordinates: 37°13′23″N 95°42′27″W
- Area: less than one acre
- Built: 1900
- Architect: Brewster, Frank
- Architectural style: Romanesque
- NRHP reference No.: 88002008
- Added to NRHP: October 13, 1988

The Union Implement and Hardware Building is a historic building in Independence, Kansas. Constructed in from 1900, it was listed on the National Register of Historic Places in 1988.

The building was a joint venture by the Union Implement and Hardware Company (a seller of agricultural implements). and Fortitude Lodge No. 107 (a local Masonic Lodge). The company's showrooms and offices occupied the first and second floor, while the lodge occupied the third and fourth floors. Union Implement went out of business in 1930, and the lodge moved to new premises in 1957.
