= Bolton, Kansas =

Unincorporated community in Montgomery County, Kansas

- Unincorporated community
- Location within Kansas Location within the United States
- Country: United States
- State: Kansas
- County: Montgomery
- Founded: 1886
- Platted: 1886
- Elevation: 820 ft (250 m)
- Time zone: UTC-6 (CST)
  - Summer (DST): UTC-5 (CDT)
- Area code: 620
- FIPS code: 20-07900
- GNIS ID: 484441

Bolton is an unincorporated community in Montgomery County, Kansas, United States.

== History ==
Bolton was laid out in 1886 when the railroad was extended to that point.
