= Independence Public Library =

Library in Independence, Kansas, US

Coordinates: 37.2225°N 95.7043°W

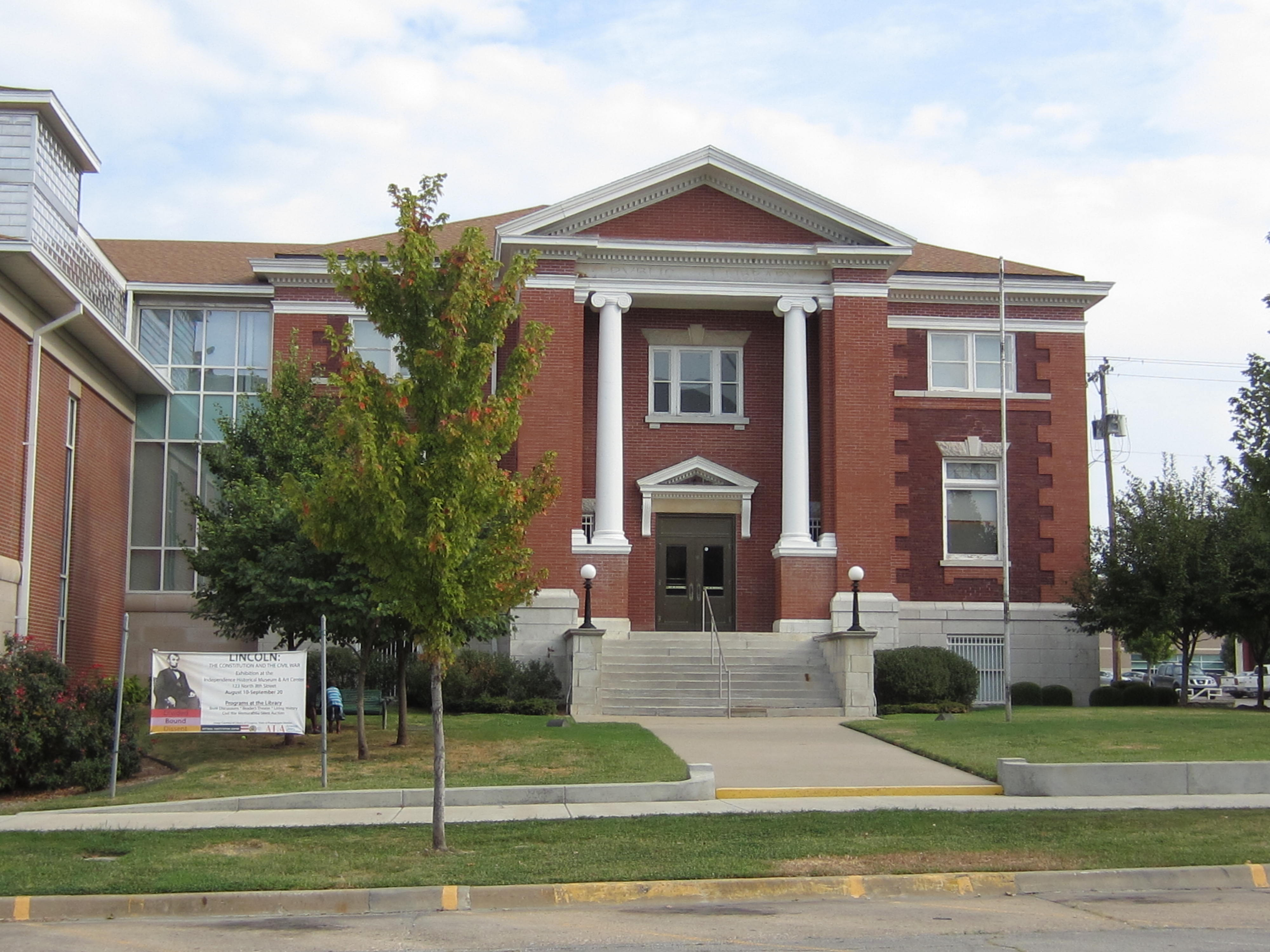
- Independence Public Library in 2013

General information
- Location: 220 E Maple St, Independence, KS 67301, Independence, Kansas
- Opened: 1907

Independence Public Library (IPL) is a small public library that has stood in the same location for more than 100 years, in Independence, Kansas. Today the library serves over thirteen thousand local residents and works in partnership with several other Kansas libraries and agencies. Its motto is "creating possibilities, changing lives."

== History ==
IPL traces its roots back to 1882 when the Ladies Library Association of Independence was tasked with finding and securing books for a small library. That goal came to fruition on December 1 of that year, when the group opened a library in the City Council room in City Hall and lined the one bookshelf with 94 books purchased for $94.25. Over the next twelve years, the Association grew the collection, moving every few years until the Association began talks with the Mayor to open a full-time home for the library. Those discussions resulted in the city agreeing to match the building funds obtained by the Association, which included a $22,500 Carnegie grant. In 1907 the library was finally opened to the public, and was then named the Carnegie Independence Public Library, located at 5th and Maple, where it still stands today.

Over the years the facility has been redesigned, redecorated, and re-energized, and now stands at 13,500 square feet.

In 2009 the library faced dramatic budget cuts and possible closure. After significant changes instituted by library administrators, the library experienced remarkable recovery, and in 2012 was given the Best Small Library in America Award, cosponsored by the Library Journal and the Bill & Melinda Gates Foundation.
