= Elk River (Kansas) =

River in Kansas, United States

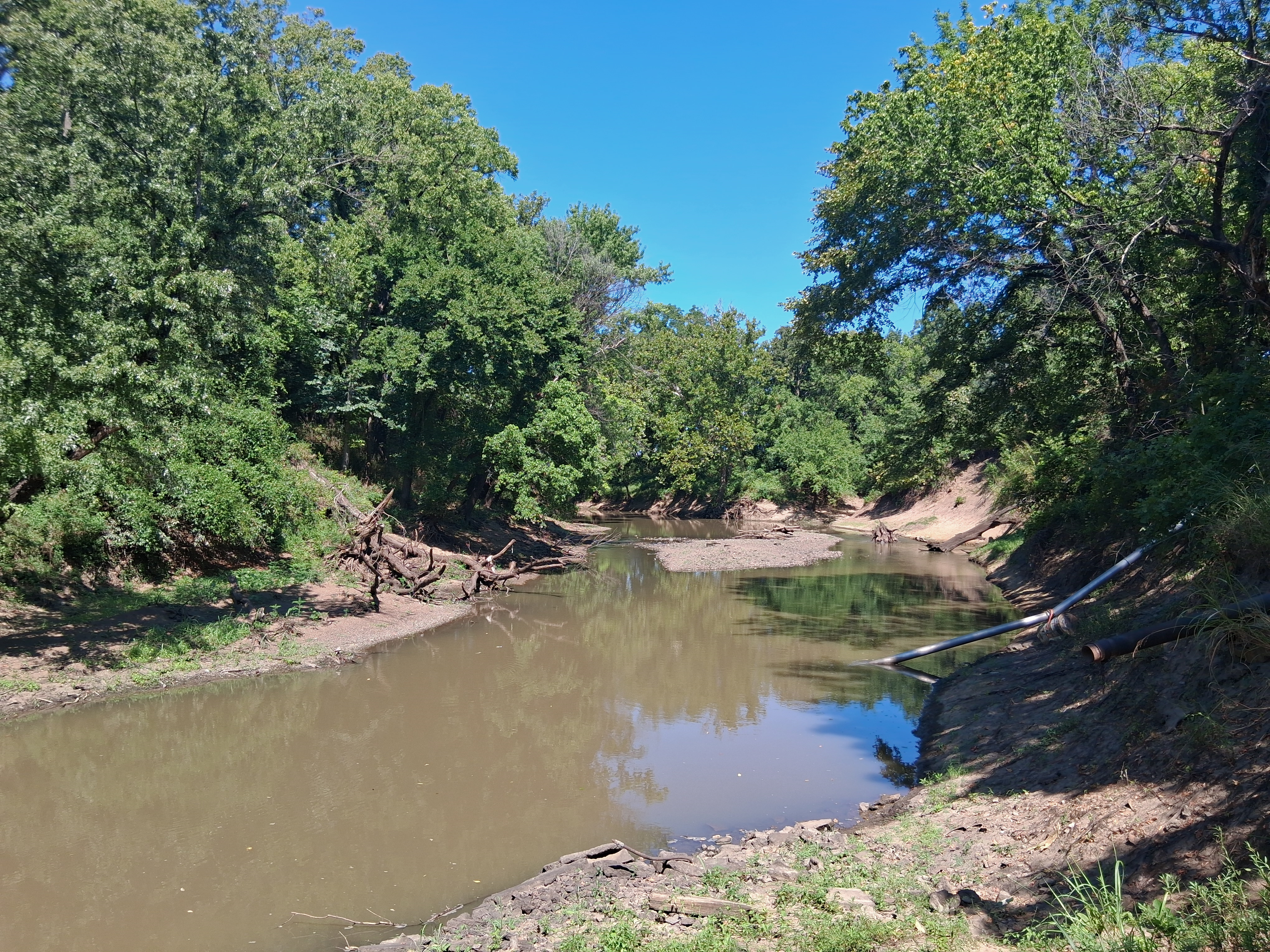
- Elk River in 2026, in Sycamore Township, Montgomery County

Location
- Country: United States
- State: Kansas
- Region: Flint Hills

Physical characteristics
- Source
  - location: Southwest Greenwood County, Flint Hills, Kansas, United States
  - coordinates: 37°36′31″N 096°31′30″W
  - elevation: 735 ft (224 m)
- Mouth: Verdigris River
  - location: Near Independence, Kansas, United States
  - coordinates: 37°15′24″N 095°41′39″W
  - elevation: 224 ft (68 m)
- Length: 95 mi (153 km), Southeast

Basin features
- River system: Verdigris River

The Elk River is a tributary of the Verdigris River in southeastern Kansas in the United States. Via the Verdigris and Arkansas rivers, it is part of the Mississippi River watershed.

== Description and course ==
The Elk River is formed by a collection of intermittent streams in southwestern Greenwood County, and flows for about 95 miles (153 km) generally east-southeast through Butler, Elk, and Montgomery counties, past the towns of Elk Falls, Longton and Elk City. It joins the Verdigris River at the northern edge of the city of Independence.

Between Elk City and Independence, a U.S. Army Corps of Engineers dam causes the river to form Elk City Lake. A state park and federal lands along the lake offer recreation, including three National Recreation Trails.

The Elk River Archeological District is a 14,807 acres (59.92 km^{2}) area in Elk and Montgomery counties, presumably in the Elk River watershed, which has been listed on the National Register of Historic Places since 1978.

== Stream course ==
Upriver:
37°15′24″N 095°41′39″W (confluence with the Verdigris River)
37°33′00″N 096°29′11″W
37°29′06″N 096°23′01″W
37°14′55″N 095°48′11″W
37°17′00″N 095°46′51″W
37°16′50″N 095°55′31″W
37°27′10″N 096°18′11″W
37°25′20″N 096°13′01″W
37°22′10″N 096°09′51″W
37°21′50″N 096°05′21″W
37°36′31″N 096°31′30″W

== See also ==
- List of Kansas rivers
