= Independence USD 446 =

Public school district in Independence, Kansas

Address
- 517 N. 10th St. Independence, Kansas, 67301; United States
- Coordinates: 37.22861°N 95.71111°W

District information
- Type: Public
- Grades: PreK to 12
- Schools: 5

Other information
- Website: indyschools.com

Independence USD 446 is a public unified school district headquartered in Independence, Kansas, United States. The district includes the communities of Independence, Elk City, Sycamore, and nearby rural areas.

== Schools ==
The school district operates the following schools:

- Independence High School
- Independence Middle School
- Jefferson Elementary School
- Eisenhower Elementary School
- Riley Early Learning Center

== See also ==
- Kansas State Department of Education
- Kansas State High School Activities Association
- List of high schools in Kansas
- List of unified school districts in Kansas
