= Neodesha Township, Kansas =

Township in Wilson County, Kansas, U.S.

Coordinates: 37.442°N 95.686°W

Neodesha Township is a township in Wilson County, Kansas, United States.

== History ==
Neodesha is an Osage Indian name meaning "meeting of the waters", or, the confluence of the Verdigris and Fall rivers.
