= Dearing, Kansas =

City in Montgomery County, Kansas

- City
- Location within Montgomery County and Kansas

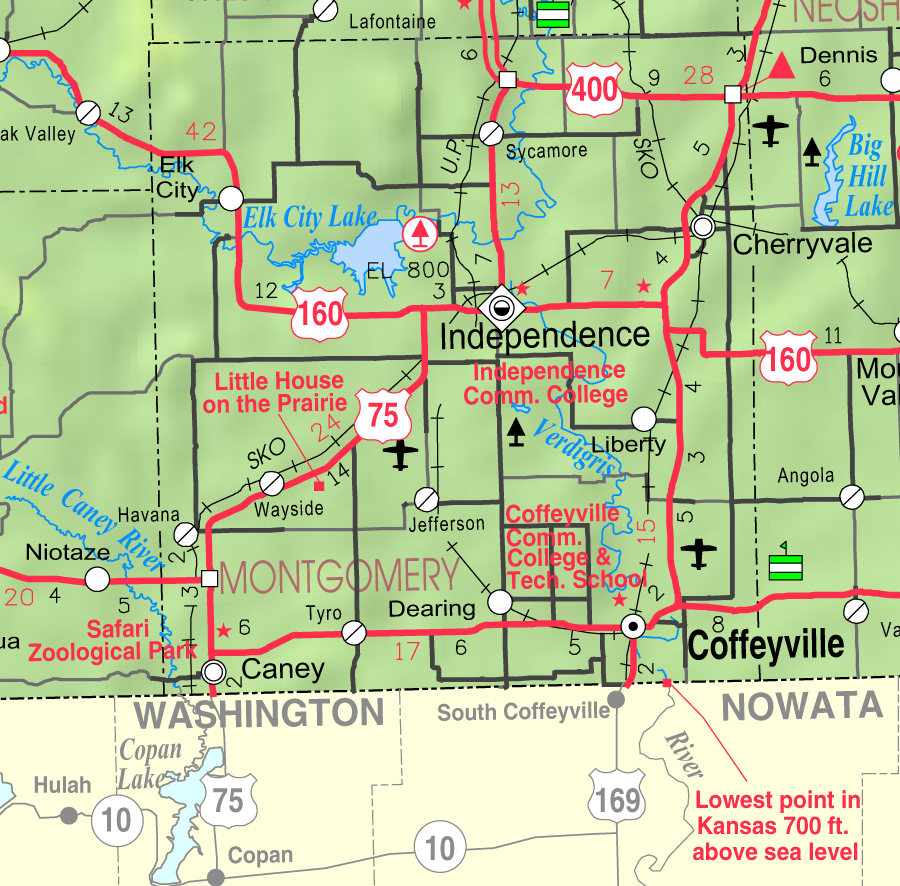
- KDOT map of Montgomery County (legend)
- Coordinates: 37°03′12″N 95°41′43″W
- Country: United States
- State: Kansas
- County: Montgomery
- Incorporated: 1909

Area
  - Total: 1.51 sq mi (3.92 km^{2})
  - Land: 1.51 sq mi (3.92 km^{2})
  - Water: 0 sq mi (0.00 km^{2})
- Elevation: 784 ft (239 m)

Population (2020)
  - Total: 382
  - Density: 252/sq mi (97.4/km^{2})
- Time zone: UTC-6 (CST)
  - Summer (DST): UTC-5 (CDT)
- ZIP Code: 67340
- Area code: 620
- FIPS code: 20-17150
- GNIS ID: 2394479
- Website: City website

Dearing is a city in Montgomery County, Kansas, United States. As of the 2020 census, the population of the city was 382.

== History ==
The first post office in Dearing was established in January 1888. Dearing was incorporated in 1909.

== Geography ==
According to the United States Census Bureau, the city has a total area of 1.52 square miles (3.94 km^{2}), all land.

== Demographics ==
Historical population
Census	Pop.	Note	%±
1910	250		—
1920	295		18.0%
1930	324		9.8%
1940	273		−15.7%
1950	261		−4.4%
1960	249		−4.6%
1970	338		35.7%
1980	475		40.5%
1990	428		−9.9%
2000	415		−3.0%
2010	431		3.9%
2020	382		−11.4%
U.S. Decennial Census

=== 2020 census ===
The 2020 United States census counted 382 people, 171 households, and 114 families in Dearing. The population density was 252.3 per square mile (97.4/km^{2}). There were 188 housing units at an average density of 124.2 per square mile (47.9/km^{2}). The racial makeup was 77.49% (296) white or European American (76.44% non-Hispanic white), 0.0% (0) black or African-American, 6.02% (23) Native American or Alaska Native, 1.05% (4) Asian, 0.26% (1) Pacific Islander or Native Hawaiian, 0.0% (0) from other races, and 15.18% (58) from two or more races. Hispanic or Latino of any race was 2.36% (9) of the population.

Of the 171 households, 31.6% had children under the age of 18; 50.3% were married couples living together; 16.4% had a female householder with no spouse or partner present. 29.2% of households consisted of individuals and 11.1% had someone living alone who was 65 years of age or older. The average household size was 2.1 and the average family size was 2.4. The percent of those with a bachelor's degree or higher was estimated to be 8.1% of the population.

19.9% of the population was under the age of 18, 3.4% from 18 to 24, 20.2% from 25 to 44, 30.9% from 45 to 64, and 25.7% who were 65 years of age or older. The median age was 50.3 years. For every 100 females, there were 96.9 males. For every 100 females ages 18 and older, there were 92.5 males.

The 2016–2020 5-year American Community Survey estimates show that the median household income was $53,125 (with a margin of error of +/- $17,581) and the median family income was $56,463 (+/- $6,930). Males had a median income of $51,346 (+/- $14,349). The median income for those above 16 years old was $32,083 (+/- $12,172). Approximately, 3.1% of families and 11.5% of the population were below the poverty line, including 4.5% of those under the age of 18 and 4.0% of those ages 65 or over.

=== 2010 census ===
As of the census of 2010, there were 431 people, 187 households, and 124 families residing in the city. The population density was 283.6 inhabitants per square mile (109.5/km^{2}). There were 209 housing units at an average density of 137.5 per square mile (53.1/km^{2}). The racial makeup of the city was 85.8% White, 0.2% African American, 5.8% Native American, 0.2% from other races, and 7.9% from two or more races. Hispanic or Latino of any race were 3.7% of the population.

There were 187 households, of which 25.1% had children under the age of 18 living with them, 51.3% were married couples living together, 9.6% had a female householder with no husband present, 5.3% had a male householder with no wife present, and 33.7% were non-families. 31.0% of all households were made up of individuals, and 14.5% had someone living alone who was 65 years of age or older. The average household size was 2.30 and the average family size was 2.79.

The median age in the city was 43.2 years. 20.9% of residents were under the age of 18; 6.6% were between the ages of 18 and 24; 24.8% were from 25 to 44; 31.1% were from 45 to 64; and 16.5% were 65 years of age or older. The gender makeup of the city was 50.1% male and 49.9% female.

=== 2000 census ===
As of the census of 2000, there were 415 people, 175 households, and 123 families residing in the city. The population density was 1,339.1 inhabitants per square mile (517.0/km^{2}). There were 203 housing units at an average density of 655.0 per square mile (252.9/km^{2}). The racial makeup of the city was 92.53% White, 0.48% African American, 3.86% Native American, 0.24% Asian, 0.24% from other races, and 2.65% from two or more races. Hispanic or Latino of any race were 0.96% of the population.

There were 175 households, out of which 28.0% had children under the age of 18 living with them, 59.4% were married couples living together, 8.6% had a female householder with no husband present, and 29.7% were non-families. 25.1% of all households were made up of individuals, and 8.0% had someone living alone who was 65 years of age or older. The average household size was 2.37 and the average family size was 2.85.

In the city, the population was spread out, with 23.4% under the age of 18, 11.3% from 18 to 24, 28.0% from 25 to 44, 22.7% from 45 to 64, and 14.7% who were 65 years of age or older. The median age was 37 years. For every 100 females, there were 109.6 males. For every 100 females age 18 and over, there were 101.3 males.

The median income for a household in the city was $27,361, and the median income for a family was $30,417. Males had a median income of $28,472 versus $20,139 for females. The per capita income for the city was $12,745. About 10.6% of families and 14.2% of the population were below the poverty line, including 13.9% of those under age 18 and 4.8% of those age 65 or over.

== Education ==
The community is served by Coffeyville USD 445 public school district.
