= Duck Creek Township, Kansas =

Township in Wilson County, Kansas, U.S.

Coordinates: 37.4186°N 95.9133°W

Duck Creek Township is a township in Wilson County, Kansas, United States.

== History ==
Duck Creek Township was established in 1871.
