= Talleyrand Township, Kansas =

Township in Wilson County, Kansas, U.S.

Coordinates: 37.4219°N 95.8067°W

Talleyrand Township is a township in Wilson County, Kansas, United States.

== History ==
Talleyrand Township was established in 1871. It may be named for Charles Maurice de Talleyrand-Périgord.
