= Washington Township, Chautauqua County, Kansas =

Washington Township
- Township
- Location in Chautauqua County
- Coordinates: 37°09′24″N 096°02′17″W
- Country: United States
- State: Kansas
- County: Chautauqua

Area
  - Total: 47.15 sq mi (122.12 km^{2})
  - Land: 46.81 sq mi (121.25 km^{2})
  - Water: 0.34 sq mi (0.87 km^{2}) 0.71%
- Elevation: 1,001 ft (305 m)

Population (2020)
  - Total: 71
  - Density: 1.6/sq mi (0.6/km^{2})
- GNIS feature ID: 0469132

Washington Township is a township in Chautauqua County, Kansas, United States. As of the 2020 census, its population was 71.

== Geography ==
Washington Township covers an area of 47.15 square miles (122.1 km^{2}) and contains no incorporated settlements. According to the USGS, it contains three cemeteries: Burton, Riley and Todd.

The streams of California Creek, Cedar Creek, Davis Creek, Deadman Creek, East Branch Grant Creek, Middle Caney Creek, North Caney Creek and West Branch Grant Creek run through this township.
