= Elk City, Kansas =

City in Montgomery County, Kansas

- City
- Location within Montgomery County and Kansas

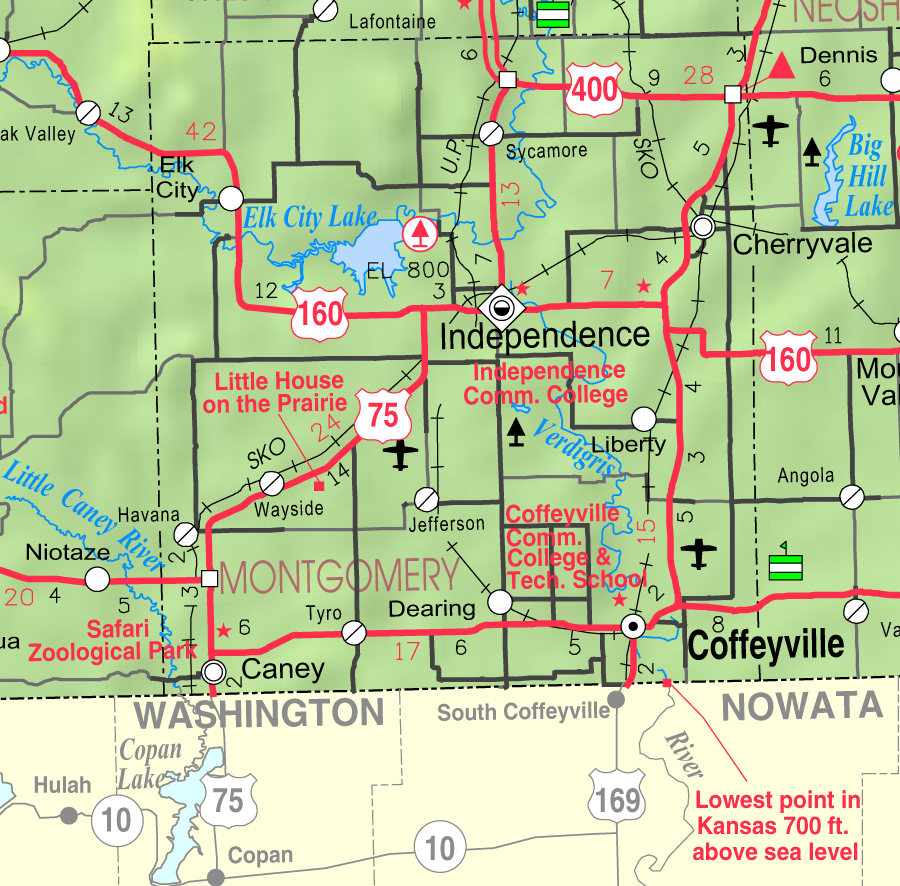
- KDOT map of Montgomery County (legend)
- Coordinates: 37°17′23″N 95°54′36″W
- Country: United States
- State: Kansas
- County: Montgomery
- Founded: 1868
- Incorporated: 1871

Area
  - Total: 0.34 sq mi (0.88 km^{2})
  - Land: 0.34 sq mi (0.88 km^{2})
  - Water: 0 sq mi (0.00 km^{2})
- Elevation: 833 ft (254 m)

Population (2020)
  - Total: 260
  - Density: 770/sq mi (300/km^{2})
- Time zone: UTC-6 (CST)
  - Summer (DST): UTC-5 (CDT)
- ZIP Code: 67344
- Area code: 620
- FIPS code: 20-20250
- GNIS ID: 2394647
- Website: elkcityks.com

Elk City is a city in Montgomery County, Kansas, United States, along the Elk River. As of the 2020 census, the population of the city was 260.

== History ==
Elk City had its start in the year 1868 by the building of a trading post at that location. The first post office in Elk City was established in November 1869.

== Geography ==
According to the United States Census Bureau, the city has a total area of 0.34 square miles (0.88 km^{2}), all land.

== Demographics ==
Historical population
Census	Pop.	Note	%±
1880	383		—
1890	796		107.8%
1900	709		−10.9%
1910	659		−7.1%
1920	725		10.0%
1930	607		−16.3%
1940	680		12.0%
1950	524		−22.9%
1960	498		−5.0%
1970	432		−13.3%
1980	404		−6.5%
1990	334		−17.3%
2000	305		−8.7%
2010	325		6.6%
2020	260		−20.0%
U.S. Decennial Census

=== 2020 census ===
The 2020 United States census counted 260 people, 106 households, and 69 families in Elk City. The population density was 769.2 per square mile (297.0/km^{2}). There were 144 housing units at an average density of 426.0 per square mile (164.5/km^{2}). The racial makeup was 88.08% (229) white or European American (85.77% non-Hispanic white), 0.0% (0) black or African-American, 1.54% (4) Native American or Alaska Native, 0.0% (0) Asian, 0.0% (0) Pacific Islander or Native Hawaiian, 0.0% (0) from other races, and 10.38% (27) from two or more races. Hispanic or Latino of any race was 3.46% (9) of the population.

Of the 106 households, 28.3% had children under the age of 18; 53.8% were married couples living together; 21.7% had a female householder with no spouse or partner present. 32.1% of households consisted of individuals and 19.8% had someone living alone who was 65 years of age or older. The average household size was 2.4 and the average family size was 3.1. The percent of those with a bachelor's degree or higher was estimated to be 12.7% of the population.

20.4% of the population was under the age of 18, 5.0% from 18 to 24, 28.5% from 25 to 44, 27.3% from 45 to 64, and 18.8% who were 65 years of age or older. The median age was 42.3 years. For every 100 females, there were 91.2 males. For every 100 females ages 18 and older, there were 95.3 males.

The 2016–2020 5-year American Community Survey estimates show that the median household income was $26,719 (with a margin of error of +/- $3,988) and the median family income was $27,321 (+/- $15,247). Males had a median income of $20,000 (+/- $13,854) versus $25,625 (+/- $16,803) for females. The median income for those above 16 years old was $25,078 (+/- $15,376). Approximately, 36.2% of families and 38.4% of the population were below the poverty line, including 54.5% of those under the age of 18 and 9.8% of those ages 65 or over.

=== 2010 census ===
As of the census of 2010, there were 325 people, 132 households, and 91 families residing in the city. The population density was 955.9 inhabitants per square mile (369.1/km^{2}). There were 172 housing units at an average density of 505.9 per square mile (195.3/km^{2}). The racial makeup of the city was 93.5% White, 0.6% African American, 0.9% Native American, 0.3% Pacific Islander, 0.6% from other races, and 4.0% from two or more races. Hispanic or Latino of any race were 0.9% of the population.

There were 132 households, of which 31.8% had children under the age of 18 living with them, 54.5% were married couples living together, 10.6% had a female householder with no husband present, 3.8% had a male householder with no wife present, and 31.1% were non-families. 25.8% of all households were made up of individuals, and 15.2% had someone living alone who was 65 years of age or older. The average household size was 2.46 and the average family size was 2.89.

The median age in the city was 42.3 years. 23.7% of residents were under the age of 18; 7.1% were between the ages of 18 and 24; 21.9% were from 25 to 44; 26.7% were from 45 to 64; and 20.6% were 65 years of age or older. The gender makeup of the city was 52.0% male and 48.0% female.

=== 2000 census ===
As of the census of 2000, there were 305 people, 135 households, and 83 families residing in the city. The population density was 889.7 inhabitants per square mile (343.5/km^{2}). There were 170 housing units at an average density of 495.9 per square mile (191.5/km^{2}). The racial makeup of the city was 94.75% White, 2.62% Native American, 0.98% from other races, and 1.64% from two or more races. Hispanic or Latino of any race were 2.30% of the population.

There were 135 households, out of which 20.7% had children under the age of 18 living with them, 51.9% were married couples living together, 6.7% had a female householder with no husband present, and 38.5% were non-families. 35.6% of all households were made up of individuals, and 23.0% had someone living alone who was 65 years of age or older. The average household size was 2.26 and the average family size was 2.93.

In the city, the population was spread out, with 21.6% under the age of 18, 8.5% from 18 to 24, 22.6% from 25 to 44, 26.2% from 45 to 64, and 21.0% who were 65 years of age or older. The median age was 44 years. For every 100 females, there were 96.8 males. For every 100 females age 18 and over, there were 92.7 males.

The median income for a household in the city was $25,000, and the median income for a family was $35,833. Males had a median income of $21,250 versus $17,708 for females. The per capita income for the city was $15,152. About 15.0% of families and 18.6% of the population were below the poverty line, including 32.8% of those under the age of eighteen and 5.8% of those 65 or over.

== Education ==
The community is served by Independence USD 446 public school district.

== Notable people ==
Harry Hines Woodring, 25th Governor of Kansas and 53rd United States Secretary of War

== See also ==
- Elk City Lake and Elk City State Park
