= Elk City Lake =

- Elk City Lake as seen from Memorial Overlook in 2026

- Location within Kansas Location within the United States

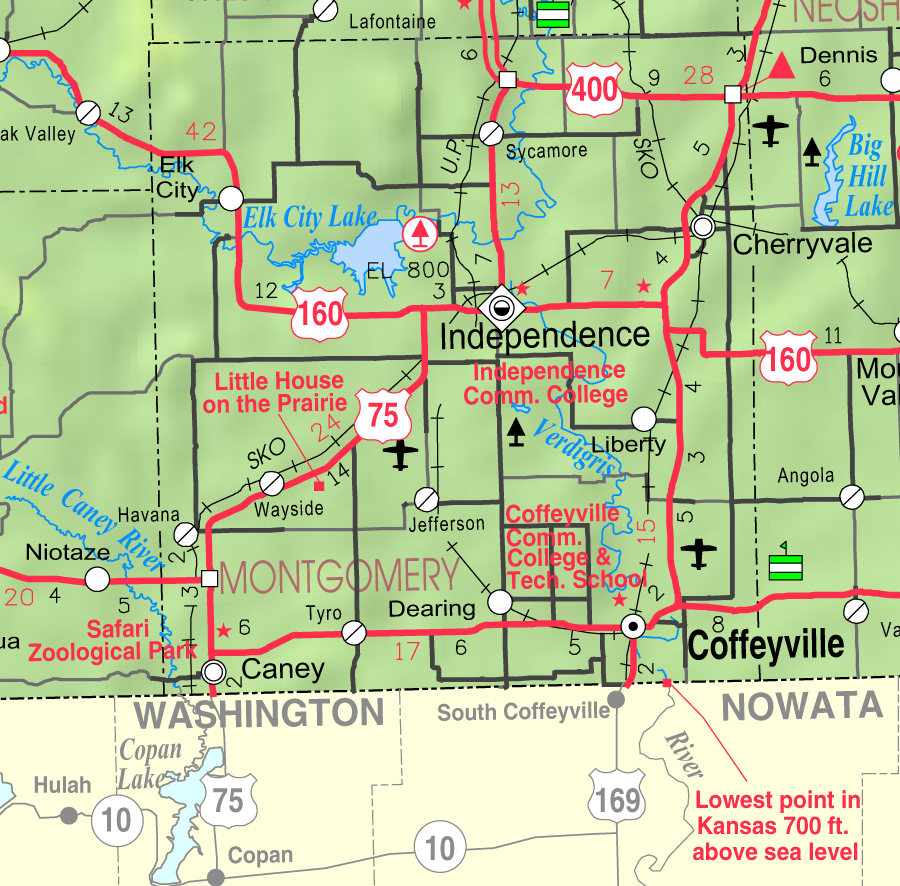
- KDOT map of Montgomery County (legend)
- Location: Montgomery County, Kansas
- Coordinates: 37°15′27″N 95°48′08″W
- Type: Reservoir
- Basin countries: United States
- Managing agency: U.S. Army Corps of Engineers
- Surface area: 4,500 acres (1,800 ha)
- Surface elevation: 791 ft (241 m)
- Settlements: Elk City, Independence

The Elk City Reservoir is a reservoir located 7 miles (11 km) east of Elk City, Kansas. The dam that forms the lake was constructed by the U.S. Army Corps of Engineers. It has approximately 4,500 acres (18 km^{2}) of water, and 12,000 acres (49 km^{2}) of wildlife, and a total of over 50 miles (80 km) of shoreline.

There are six hiking trails at the Elk City Reservoir, two of which are notable for receiving a National Trails designation. The scenic Elk River hiking trail is 15 miles (24 km) long, and goes from the west edge of the dam westward to the bridge on Elk River. The Table Mound hiking trail is 2.75 miles long and runs along the east side of the lake from a scenic overlook at the dam to the Timber Road campground. Other trails include the 2/3 miles long Post Oak Self-Guided Nature Trail at the scenic overlook, the 1 mile long Green Thumb Nature Trail at the Timber Road campground, the paved and handicapped accessible 3.3 miles long South Squaw Multipurpose trail, and the 2.33 miles long Timber Ridge Hiking Trail southwest of the lake. There is also a four miles long Eagle Rock Mountain Biking Trail which begins along the Elk River just north of the reservoir outlet.

== See also ==
- List of Kansas state parks
- List of lakes, reservoirs, and dams in Kansas
- List of rivers of Kansas
