= Independence, Kansas =

City in Montgomery County, Kansas

- City and County seat
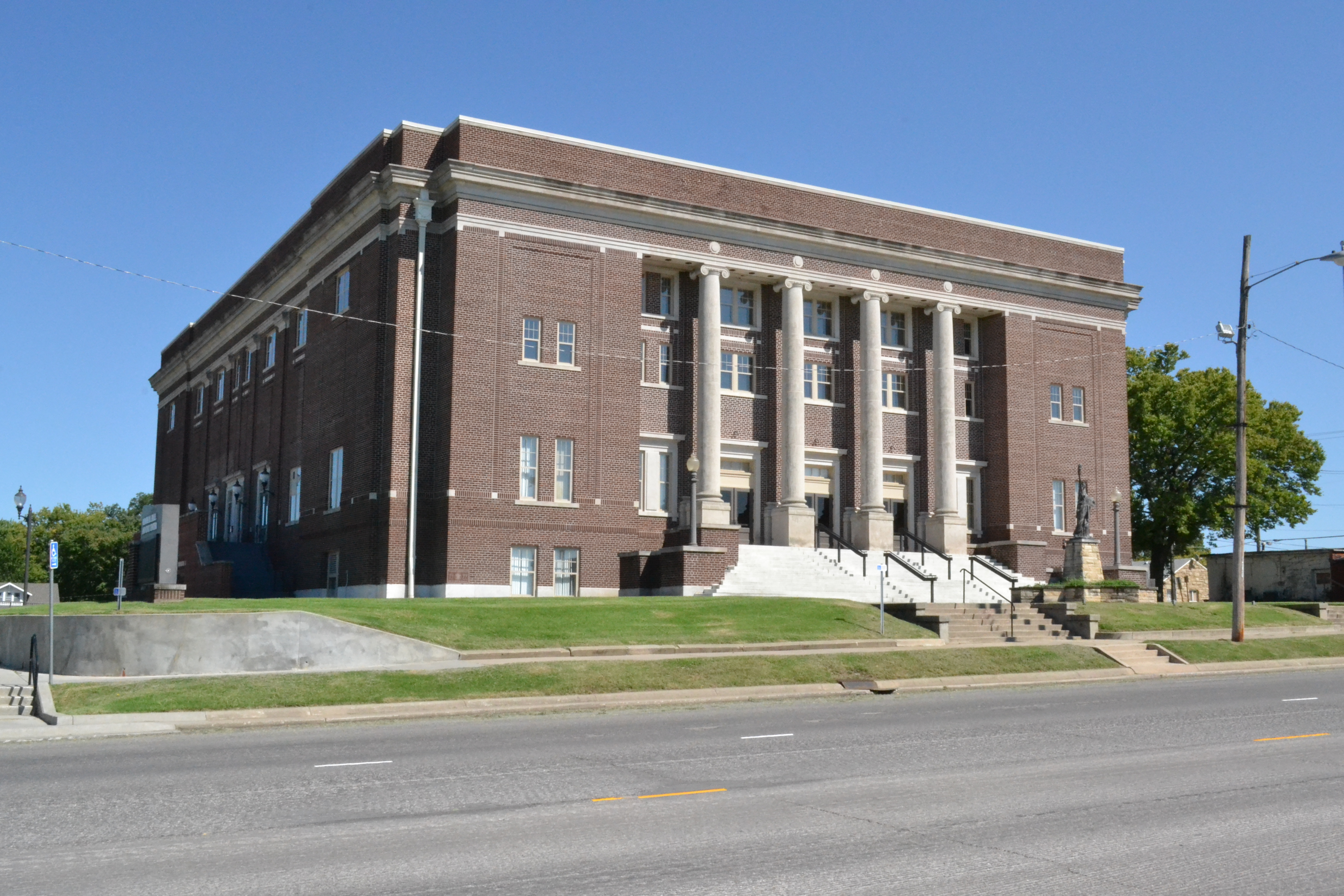
- Memorial Hall (2017)

- Location within Montgomery County and Kansas

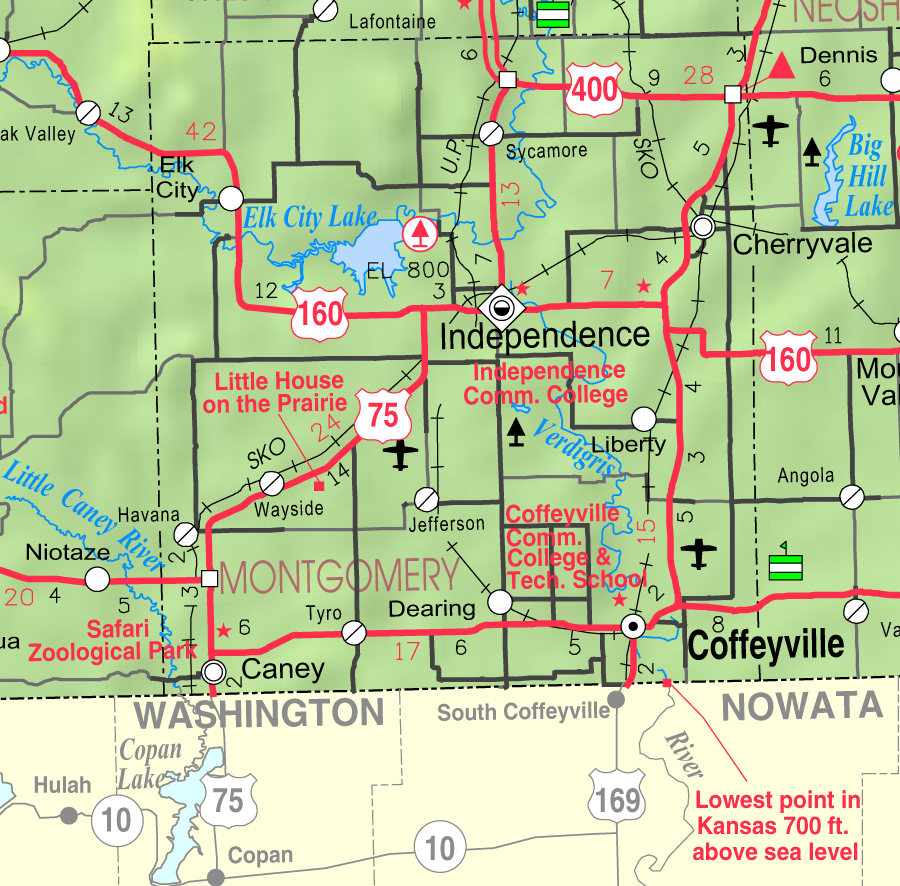
- KDOT map of Montgomery County (legend)
- Coordinates: 37°13′32″N 95°43′10″W
- Country: United States
- State: Kansas
- County: Montgomery
- Founded: 1869 (Colfax)
- Incorporated: 1870
- Named for: United States Declaration of Independence

Government
  - Type: Commission/City Manager
  - Mayor: Scott Smith
  - City Manager: Kelly Passauer

Area
  - Total: 7.68 sq mi (19.88 km^{2})
  - Land: 7.67 sq mi (19.86 km^{2})
  - Water: 0.0039 sq mi (0.01 km^{2})
- Elevation: 778 ft (237 m)

Population (2020)
  - Total: 8,548
  - Density: 1,115/sq mi (430.4/km^{2})
- Time zone: UTC−6 (CST)
  - Summer (DST): UTC−5 (CDT)
- ZIP Code: 67301
- Area code: 620
- FIPS code: 20-33875
- GNIS ID: 485598
- Website: independenceks.gov

Independence is a city in and the county seat of Montgomery County, Kansas, United States. As of the 2020 census, the population of the city was 8,548. It was named in commemoration of the Declaration of Independence. Independence Community College is located here.

== History ==
The Osage Indians had settled much of southeast Kansas over the course of the 1830s and 40s and sold land claims over the course of the 1860s to incoming American homesteaders and moved into Indian Territory (present-day Oklahoma) where they became settled farmers, selling their whole remaining claim to the United States government in 1870 for $1.25 an acre.

Independence was settled on land that was purchased from the Osage Nation in September 1869 by George A. Brown for the price of $50. Brown originally called the townsite Colfax after Schuyler Colfax, vice president under President Ulysses S. Grant. On August 21, 1869 a group of Oswego, Kansas men led by R. W. Wright settled there with the intent to make Independence the county seat. E. E. Wilson and F D. Irwin opened the first store in October 1869, naming it Wilson & Irwin Groceries. Independence was designated county seat in 1870.

On April 17, 1930 the city was the first to use a permanent lighting system for an exhibition baseball game: it was held between the Independence Producers and House of David semi-professional baseball team of Benton Harbor, Michigan. The Independence team won with a score of 9 to 1 before a crowd of 1,700 spectators.

Miss Able, a rhesus monkey, was born at Ralph Mitchell Zoo. Miss Able along with Miss Baker, a squirrel monkey, became the first monkeys that the United States used in its space program to fly in space; they returned alive on May 28, 1959.

== Geography ==
Independence is located along the Verdigris River just south of its confluence with the Elk River. According to the United States Census Bureau, the city has a total area of 7.75 square miles (20.07 km^{2}), of which, 7.74 square miles (20.05 km^{2}) is land and 0.01 square miles (0.03 km^{2}) is water.

=== Climate ===
Independence has a humid subtropical climate (Köppen Cfa) characterized by hot, humid and unpleasant summers, and chilly though extremely variable winters. Precipitation is heavy in summer due to frequent incursions of very moist air from the Gulf of Mexico: as much as 7.69 inches (195.3 mm) fell on May 27, 1984 and a maximum daily fall of 3.49 inches or 88.6 millimetres can be expected in an average calendar year. The wettest month has been June 2007 when 19.53 inches (496.1 mm) was reported, whereas July 1935 saw a mere 0.03 inches (0.8 mm). The winters are drier and cold, although temperatures in winter are very erratic, ranging from an average of four afternoons in the three winter months above 70 °F or 21.1 °C to an average of three mornings below 0 °F or −17.8 °C. Winters are much drier than the summer, with November 1986 and October 1952 seeing not even a trace of precipitation.

Overall the wettest calendar year has been 1908 with 60.29 inches (1,531.4 mm) – although the incomplete year of 2007 likely had more than this – and the driest 1952 with only 18.27 inches (464.1 mm). The hottest month has been July 1936 with an average of 88 °F (31.1 °C) and a mean maximum of 104.8 °F or 40.4 °C, while the coldest has been January 1979 with an average of 18.8 °F (−7.3 °C), a mean maximum of only 28.9 °F (−1.7 °C) and a mean minimum of 8.7 °F or −12.9 °C. The hottest monthly mean minimum was in July 2011 with a mean low as high as 74.3 °F or 23.5 °C.

Climate data for Independence, Kansas, 1991–2020 normals, extremes 1893–present
Month	Jan	Feb	Mar	Apr	May	Jun	Jul	Aug	Sep	Oct	Nov	Dec	Year
Record high °F (°C)	78 (26)	88 (31)	98 (37)	101 (38)	102 (39)	109 (43)	115 (46)	116 (47)	111 (44)	99 (37)	88 (31)	80 (27)	116 (47)
Mean maximum °F (°C)	68.5 (20.3)	73.4 (23.0)	81.2 (27.3)	85.6 (29.8)	89.3 (31.8)	93.6 (34.2)	100.0 (37.8)	100.3 (37.9)	95.4 (35.2)	87.3 (30.7)	77.4 (25.2)	68.7 (20.4)	101.7 (38.7)
Mean daily maximum °F (°C)	44.9 (7.2)	50.0 (10.0)	59.8 (15.4)	69.1 (20.6)	77.0 (25.0)	85.6 (29.8)	90.7 (32.6)	90.3 (32.4)	82.6 (28.1)	71.6 (22.0)	58.7 (14.8)	47.5 (8.6)	69.0 (20.5)
Daily mean °F (°C)	33.8 (1.0)	38.0 (3.3)	47.5 (8.6)	57.0 (13.9)	66.3 (19.1)	75.4 (24.1)	80.2 (26.8)	79.0 (26.1)	70.9 (21.6)	59.2 (15.1)	47.0 (8.3)	36.9 (2.7)	57.6 (14.2)
Mean daily minimum °F (°C)	22.7 (−5.2)	26.0 (−3.3)	35.2 (1.8)	44.9 (7.2)	55.5 (13.1)	65.2 (18.4)	69.6 (20.9)	67.6 (19.8)	59.2 (15.1)	46.8 (8.2)	35.2 (1.8)	26.4 (−3.1)	46.2 (7.9)
Mean minimum °F (°C)	6.4 (−14.2)	10.9 (−11.7)	19.4 (−7.0)	30.9 (−0.6)	42.0 (5.6)	54.8 (12.7)	61.5 (16.4)	58.7 (14.8)	45.4 (7.4)	31.6 (−0.2)	20.8 (−6.2)	10.5 (−11.9)	2.4 (−16.4)
Record low °F (°C)	−19 (−28)	−23 (−31)	−5 (−21)	15 (−9)	28 (−2)	42 (6)	46 (8)	43 (6)	29 (−2)	16 (−9)	5 (−15)	−16 (−27)	−23 (−31)
Average precipitation inches (mm)	1.44 (37)	1.85 (47)	2.88 (73)	4.47 (114)	6.76 (172)	6.26 (159)	4.29 (109)	4.49 (114)	4.12 (105)	4.09 (104)	2.40 (61)	2.35 (60)	45.40 (1,153)
Average snowfall inches (cm)	2.2 (5.6)	0.9 (2.3)	1.9 (4.8)	0.0 (0.0)	0.0 (0.0)	0.0 (0.0)	0.0 (0.0)	0.0 (0.0)	0.0 (0.0)	0.0 (0.0)	0.3 (0.76)	2.1 (5.3)	7.4 (18.76)
Average precipitation days (≥ 0.01 in)	5.8	5.7	8.3	9.7	11.7	9.3	8.0	7.4	7.1	7.7	6.3	6.3	93.3
Average snowy days (≥ 0.1 in)	1.9	0.8	0.7	0.0	0.0	0.0	0.0	0.0	0.0	0.0	0.3	1.2	4.9
Source 1: NOAA
Source 2: National Weather Service

== Demographics ==
Historical population
Census	Pop.	Note	%±
1870	435		—
1880	2,915		570.1%
1890	3,127		7.3%
1900	4,851		55.1%
1910	10,480		116.0%
1920	11,920		13.7%
1930	12,782		7.2%
1940	11,565		−9.5%
1950	11,335		−2.0%
1960	11,222		−1.0%
1970	10,347		−7.8%
1980	10,598		2.4%
1990	9,942		−6.2%
2000	9,846		−1.0%
2010	9,483		−3.7%
2020	8,548		−9.9%
2023 (est.)	8,315		−2.7%
U.S. Decennial Census; 2010-2020

=== 2020 census ===
As of the 2020 census, Independence had a population of 8,548 people, with 3,627 households and 2,088 families. The population density was 1,114.6 per square mile (430.4/km^{2}), and there were 4,380 housing units at an average density of 571.1 per square mile (220.5/km^{2}).

The median age was 38.9 years. 24.8% of residents were under the age of 18, 7.9% were from 18 to 24, 23.8% were from 25 to 44, 23.5% were from 45 to 64, and 19.9% were 65 years of age or older. For every 100 females there were 91.6 males, and for every 100 females age 18 and over there were 89.9 males age 18 and over.

99.0% of residents lived in urban areas, while 1.0% lived in rural areas.

Of the 3,627 households, 28.5% had children under the age of 18 living in them. Of all households, 36.8% were married-couple households, 21.7% were households with a male householder and no spouse or partner present, and 32.3% were households with a female householder and no spouse or partner present. About 36.0% of all households were made up of individuals, and 16.3% had someone living alone who was 65 years of age or older.

There were 4,380 housing units, of which 17.2% were vacant. The homeowner vacancy rate was 4.8% and the rental vacancy rate was 12.2%.

Racial composition as of the 2020 census
Race	Number	Percent
White	6,763	79.1%
Black or African American	470	5.5%
American Indian and Alaska Native	142	1.7%
Asian	75	0.9%
Native Hawaiian and Other Pacific Islander	4	0.0%
Some other race	219	2.6%
Two or more races	875	10.2%
Hispanic or Latino (of any race)	704	8.2%

Demographic estimates

The average household size was 2.1 and the average family size was 2.8. The percent of those with a bachelor's degree or higher was estimated to be 15.8% of the population.

Income and poverty

The 2016–2020 5-year American Community Survey estimates show that the median household income was $38,963 (with a margin of error of +/- $4,924) and the median family income was $50,299 (+/- $5,851). Males had a median income of $31,436 (+/- $4,208) versus $23,707 (+/- $4,084) for females. The median income for those above 16 years old was $27,652 (+/- $3,039). Approximately, 14.7% of families and 21.0% of the population were below the poverty line, including 34.3% of those under the age of 18 and 12.0% of those ages 65 or over.

=== 2010 census ===
As of the census of 2010, there were 9,483 people, 3,950 households, and 2,430 families living in the city. The population density was 1,225.2 inhabitants per square mile (473.1/km^{2}). There were 4,528 housing units at an average density of 585.0 per square mile (225.9/km^{2}). The racial makeup of the city was 84.2% White, 6.5% African American, 1.6% Native American, 0.9% Asian, 2.3% from other races, and 4.5% from two or more races. Hispanic or Latino of any race were 6.5% of the population.

There were 3,950 households, of which 33.0% had children under the age of 18 living with them, 40.9% were married couples living together, 14.9% had a female householder with no husband present, 5.7% had a male householder with no wife present, and 38.5% were non-families. 33.0% of all households were made up of individuals, and 14.8% had someone living alone who was 65 years of age or older. The average household size was 2.35 and the average family size was 2.95.

The median age in the city was 36.9 years. 26% of residents were under the age of 18; 8.6% were between the ages of 18 and 24; 24.5% were from 25 to 44; 24.9% were from 45 to 64; and 15.9% were 65 years of age or older. The gender makeup of the city was 48.4% male and 51.6% female.

== Arts and culture ==
=== Area attractions ===
- The William Inge Center for the Arts at Independence Community College maintains the archives of playwright and alumnus, William Inge.
- At the 1964 New York World's Fair, Sinclair Oil sponsored a dinosaur exhibit, featuring life-size replicas of nine different dinosaurs. On flatbed trucks, they toured the United States. Headquartered in Independence, Sinclair Pipeline Company, a division of Sinclair Oil, was acquired by Atlantic Richfield (ARCO). After the acquisition by ARCO, one of the nine dinosaurs, the Corythosaurus, was donated to Riverside Park.
- Riverside Park and Ralph Mitchell Zoo features a playground, tennis courts, miniature golf, miniature train, and a merry go round. The zoo was the homeplace of the rhesus macaque Miss Able, who was chosen by NASA alongside Miss Baker to test out space travel and become the first animals launched into space; she is commemorated with a sign. The park is also home to Shulthis Stadium and Emmot Field, the site of the first night baseball game, and home field where Mickey Mantle began his professional baseball career.

== Education ==
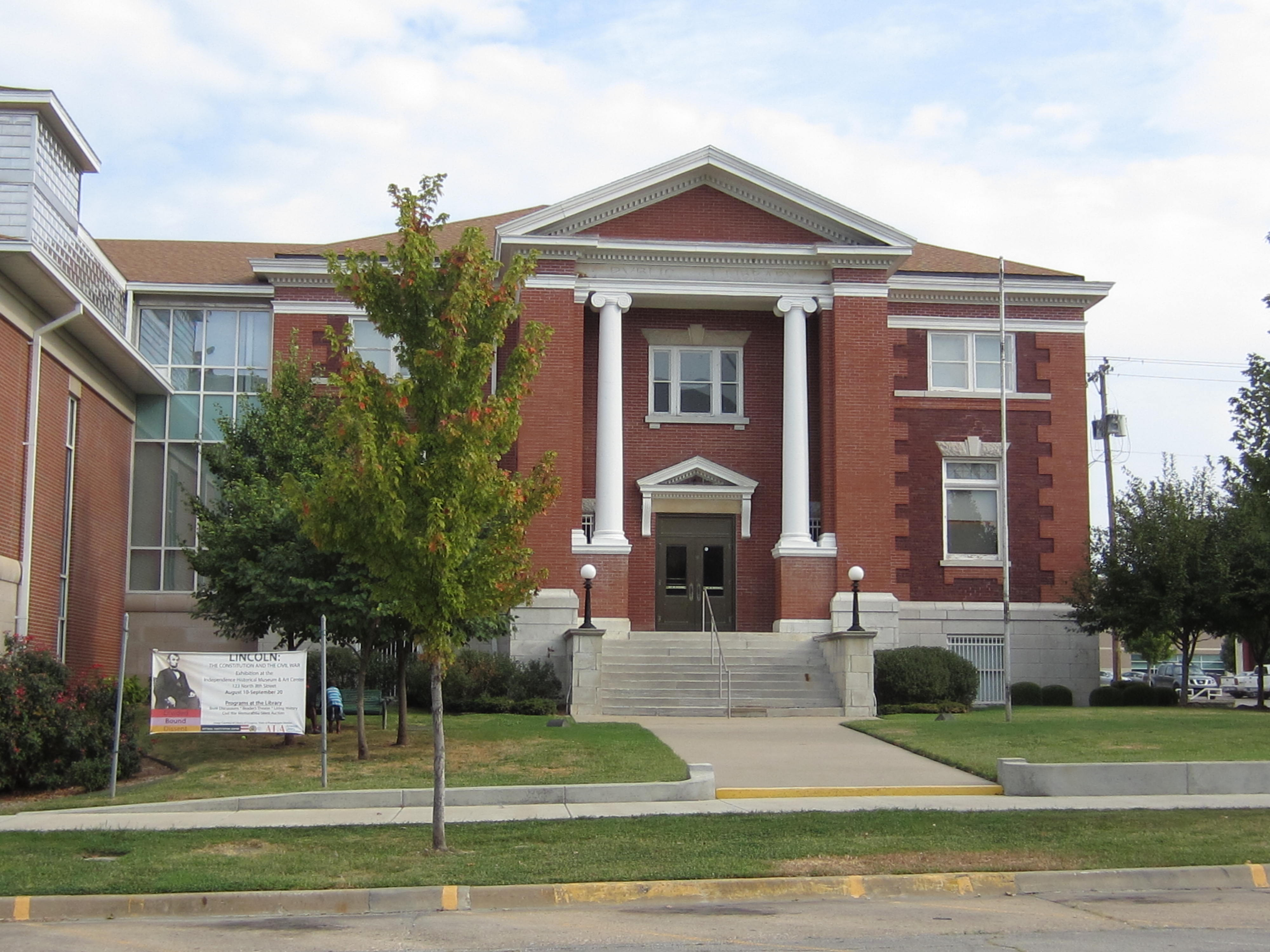
Independence Carnegie Library (2013)

=== Colleges ===
The Independence Community College main campus is located two miles south of the city. ICC West Campus is located in the city one mile west of the downtown. Each semester, over 1000 students are enrolled at ICC.

=== Primary and secondary education ===
The community is served by Independence USD 446 public school district.

- Independence High School (9–12)
- Independence Middle School (6–8)
- Jefferson Elementary School (3–5)
- Eisenhower Elementary School (PreK–2)

=== Private schools ===
- Zion Lutheran School (PreK–8)
- St. Andrew School (PreK–8)
- Independence Bible School (PreK–12)

=== Special education ===
- Tri-County Education Co-operative, special education (all grades)

== Infrastructure ==
=== Transportation ===
==== Highways ====
Independence is located at the intersection of US-75 and US-160.

==== Railroads ====
Independence is served by two railroad companies:

- Union Pacific Railroad, which operates on the former Missouri Pacific Railroad tracks.
- South Kansas and Oklahoma Railroad, a shortline railroad owned by WATCO, which operates on the former Atchison, Topeka and Santa Fe Railway tracks.

==== Airports ====
Independence Municipal Airport is located 5 miles (8.0 km) southwest of the city.

== Notable people ==
- Taylor Armstrong, born as Shana Hughes, former reality show celebrity on The Real Housewives of Beverly Hills
- H. H. Atherton, Minnesota state senator; lived in Independence
- Tacy Atkinson, Christian missionary
- Sheila Bair, former chairwoman, Federal Deposit Insurance Corporation
- Gerry Bamman, actor
- Benny Bartlett, actor
- Elizabeth Broun, art historian
- Donald Graham Burt, Academy Award winning production designer
- Jim Halsey, artist manager, agent, and impresario
- Sherman Halsey, music video producer and director, talent agent
- Scott Hastings, NBA basketball player
- William Wadsworth Hodkinson, founded Paramount Pictures and ventured into commercial aviation
- Lyman U. Humphrey, newspaper editor, banker, 11th Governor of Kansas
- William Inge, Pulitzer Prize-winning playwright, Academy Award-winning screenwriter
- Bill Kurtis, television journalist
- Alf Landon, 1936 Republican presidential candidate, 26th Governor of Kansas
- Mary Howard de Liagre, actress
- Dave McGinnis, NFL coach
- John Morris, composer
- Gareth Porter, historian, author and international journalist
- Derek Schmidt, U.S. representative for Kansas and former attorney general of Kansas
- Jean Schodorf, former Kansas Senate Majority Leader and congressional candidate
- Harry F. Sinclair, founder of Sinclair Oil
- Charlie Tidwell, sprinter/hurdler active between 1958–60
- Vivian Vance, actress
- Ron Warner, NFL football player
