= Benjamin D. Price =

American architect

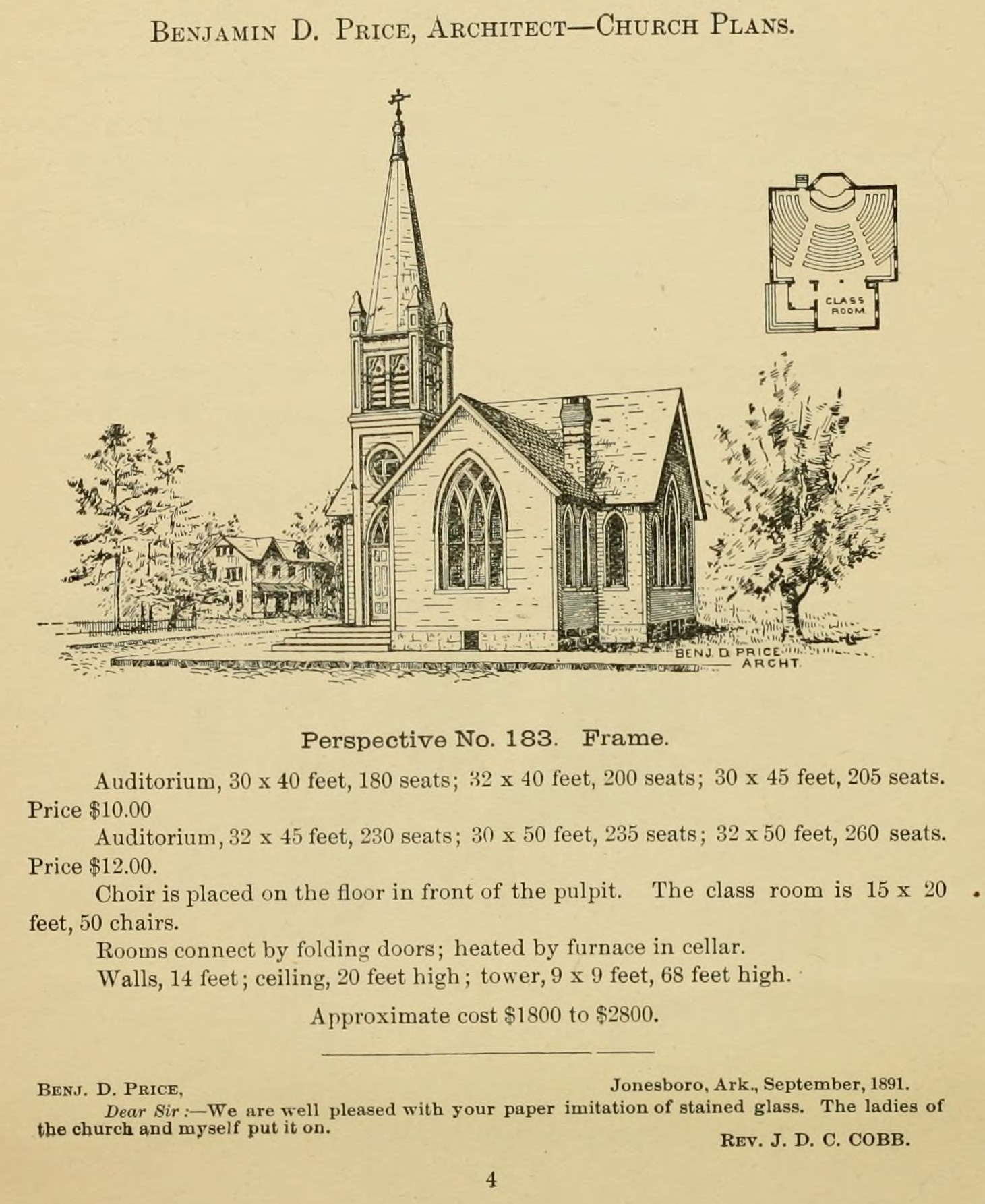
Page from 1892 edition of Price's "Church Plans"

Benjamin Detwiler Price (September 3, 1845 - September 19, 1922) was an architect known principally for his catalogue sales of plans for churches. He reportedly sold over 6,000 copies of his church plans, and several of the churches he designed are listed on the United States National Register of Historic Places.

== Architectural practice ==
Born in North Coventry, Pennsylvania, he established his architectural practice at Philadelphia, Pennsylvania. In the 1870s, he began marketing plans for churches through the mail. In 1876, Price began working with the Methodist Episcopal Board of Church Extension and prepared 67 church plans for them. The Methodist Episcopal Church Board sold copies of Price's plans by mail for prices ranging from two to fifty dollars. By 1885, the Board had sold 1,975 copies of Price's plans. In 1889, Price reacquired the rights to his designs from the Board. In the 1892 edition of "Church Plans," Price wrote that he had sold 600 copies of his plans in 1891 and that a total of 5,350 plans had been sold through December 31, 1891. He claimed to have sold more than 6,000 copies of his plans between 1876 and 1907. A number of editions of his book "Church Plans" were published from 1885 to 1906.

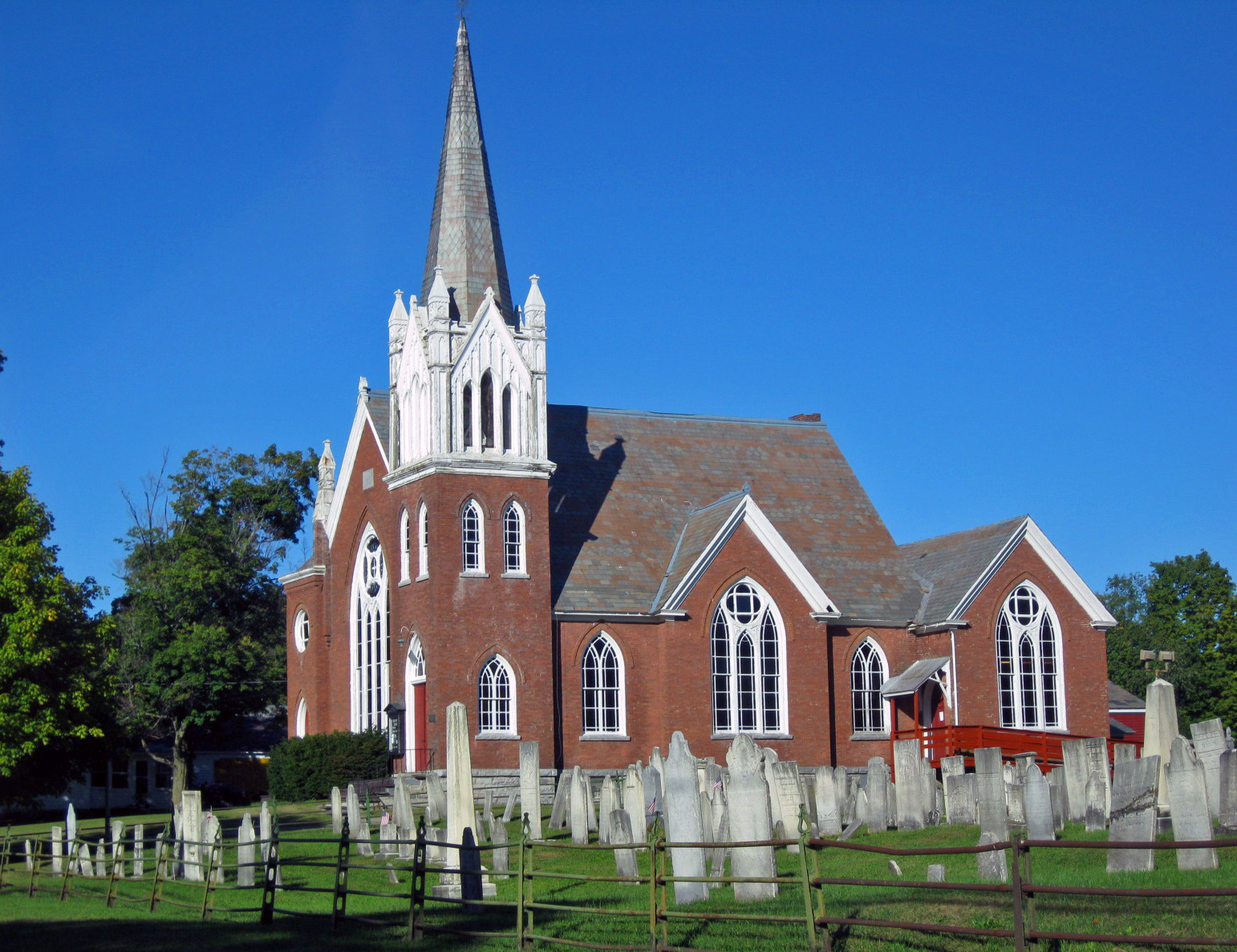
Hartford Baptist Church

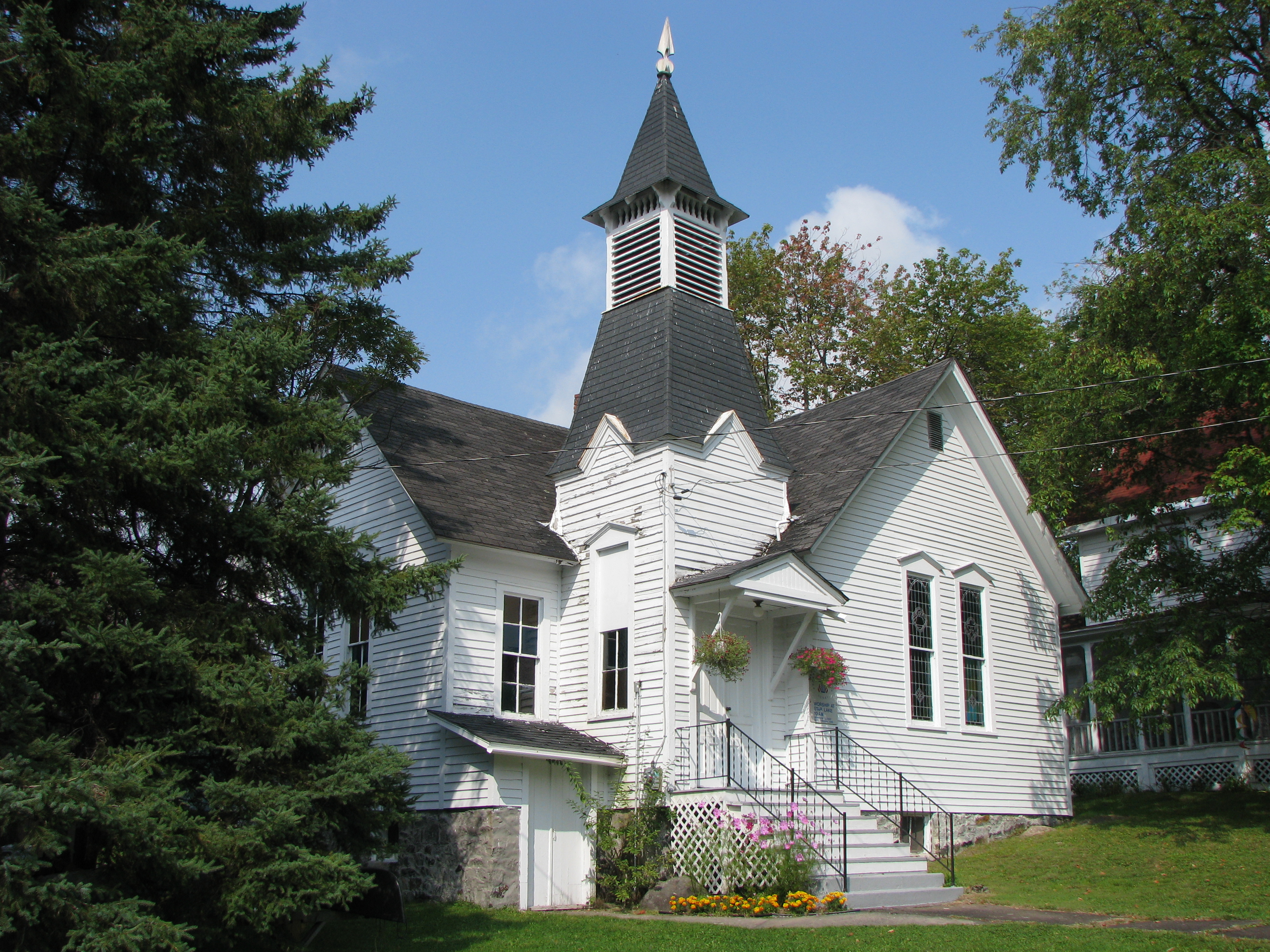
Wanakena Presbyterian Church

== Family and personal life ==
Price was married in 1872 to Mary W. Dingee. Price and his son, Max Charles Price, co-authored later editions of "Church Plans" and also formed a company to manufacture and sell paper imitation stained glass. By 1900, he had moved to Middletown Township, Monmouth County, New Jersey. By 1920, he had moved to Punta Gorda, Florida. In 1922, Price died in Punta Gorda, Florida.

== Works ==
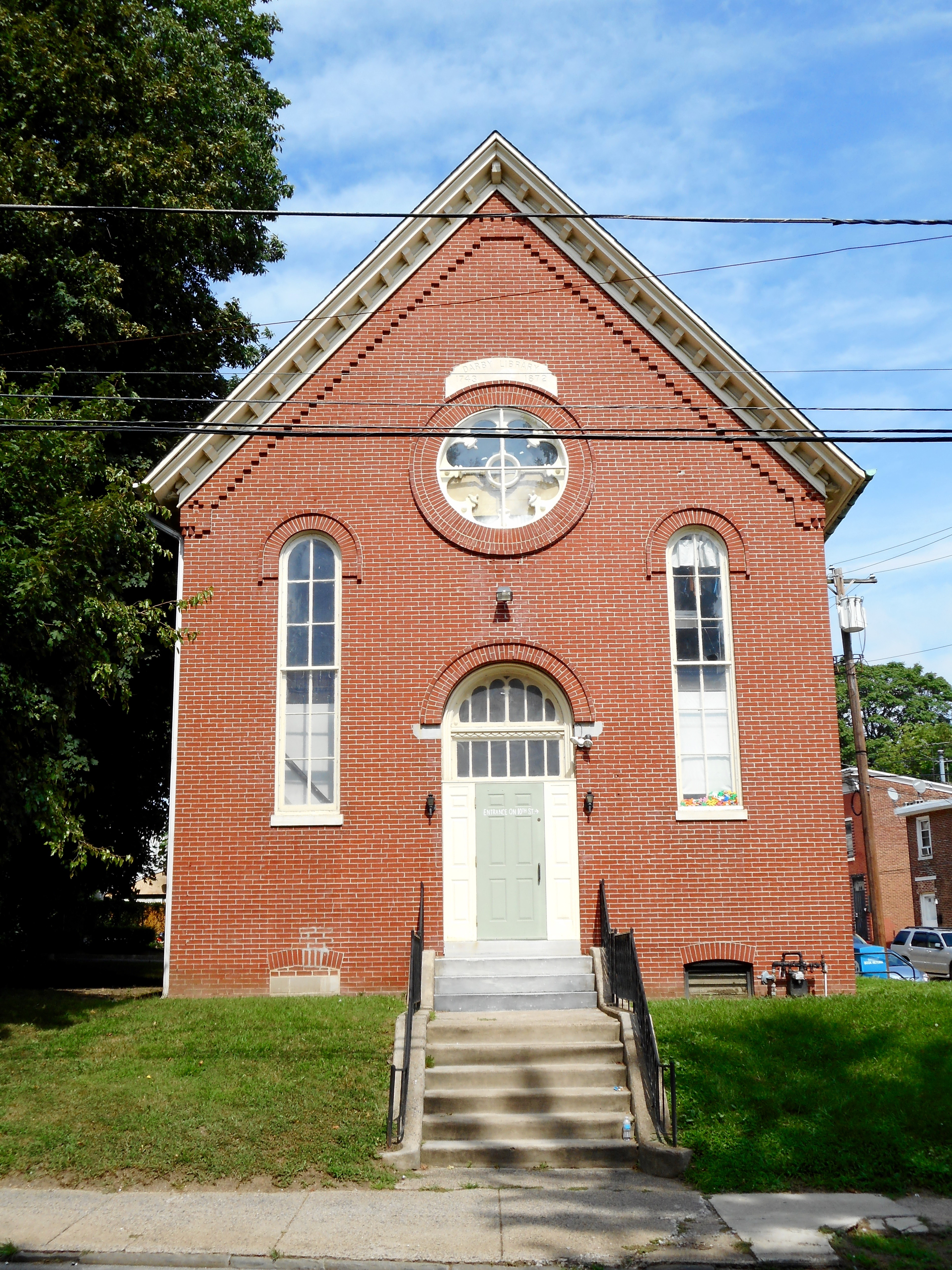
Darby Free Library

A number of Price's works are listed on the National Register of Historic Places. His works include:

- Changewater Methodist Episcopal Church (1900), Lebanon Township, Hunterdon County, New Jersey
- Darby Free Library (1872) in Darby, Pennsylvania
- First Christian Church (1911), North Main Street, Nashville, Arkansas (Price, Benjamin D.; Price, Max Charles), NRHP-listed
- First Methodist Church (1888), Mays Landing, New Jersey

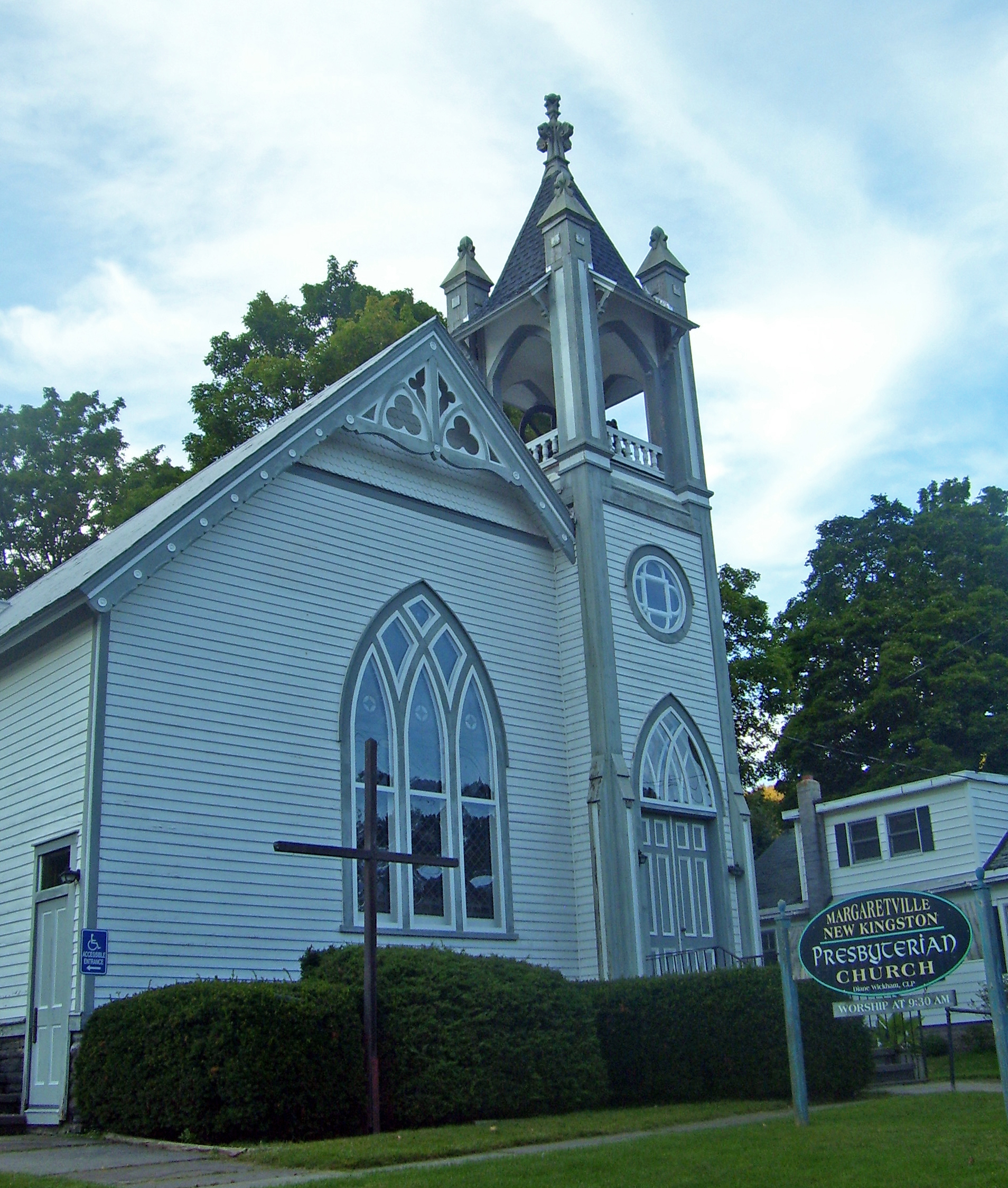
First Presbyterian Church of Margaretville, New York

- First Presbyterian Church of Margaretville, Orchard Street, Margaretville, New York

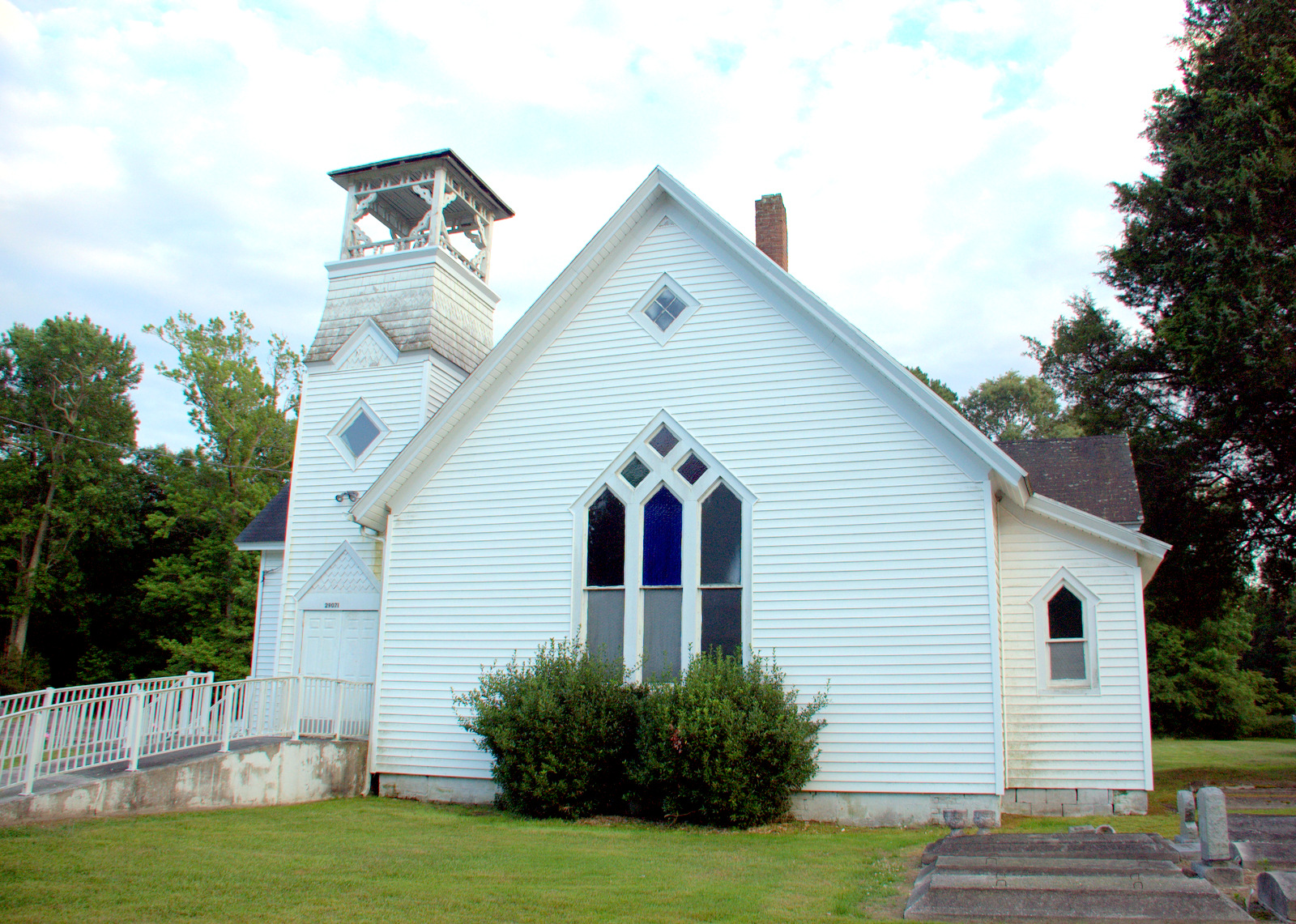
Mt. Zion Memorial Church, Princess Anne, Maryland

- First United Methodist Church (1885 major remodel of 1858 structure), 91 West Main St., Freehold, New Jersey
- Hartford Baptist Church and Cemetery, 56 NY 23 (Main St.), Hartford, New York (Price, Benjamin D.), NRHP-listed
- Manatawna Baptist Church (1913), now Andorra Baptist Church, 8711 Ridge Avenue, Philadelphia, Pennsylvania
- Methodist church, Groveville, New Jersey
- Methodist church, Navesink, New Jersey
- Mt. Zion Memorial Church, 29071 Polks Road, Princess Anne, Maryland (Price, Benjamin D.), NRHP-listed
- Niotaze Methodist Episcopal Church (c. 1895), 301 North F Street, Niotaze, Kansas (Price, Benjamin D.), NRHP-listed
- Simpson Memorial United Methodist Church (1899), 9449 Harrison Street, Greenville, Indiana (Price, Benjamin D.), NRHP-listed
- Snoqualmie American Legion Renton-Pickering Post #79, originally Snoqualmie Methodist Church. Built in 1892 from Price's Church Plans by Edmund Kinsey (father of photographer's Darius and Clark Kinsey); moved across street in 1920s and converted to Legion Hall in 1926. King County Historic Landmark as part of Snoqualmie Historic Commercial District.
- Trinity Methodist Episcopal Church (1881), Millville, New Jersey (probably based on plans #6 and 6b in the 1906 edition of "Church Plans")
- Wanakena Presbyterian Church, 32 Second Street, Wanakena, New York (Price, Benjamin D.), NRHP-listed
