= Wayside, Kansas =

Unincorporated community in Montgomery County, Kansas

- CDP
- Wayside Christian Church in 2026

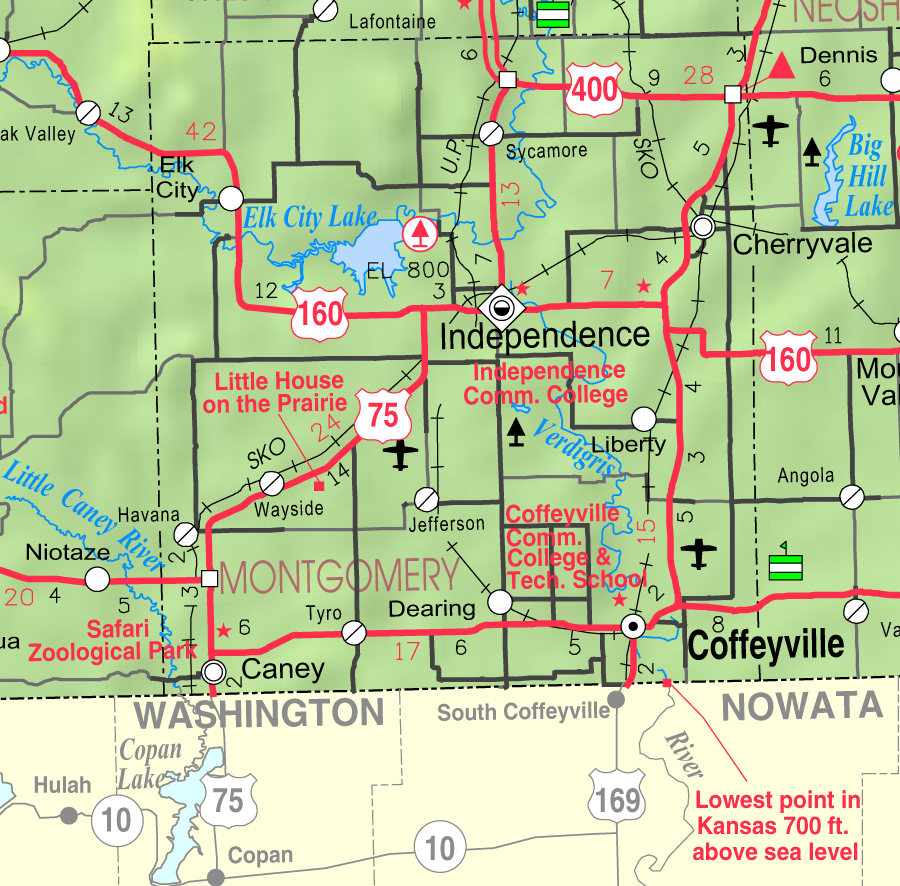
- KDOT map of Montgomery County (legend)

- Location within Kansas Location within the United States
- Coordinates: 37°07′29″N 95°52′12″W
- Country: United States
- State: Kansas
- County: Montgomery
- Elevation: 892 ft (272 m)

Population (2020)
  - Total: 19
- Time zone: UTC-6 (CST)
  - Summer (DST): UTC-5 (CDT)
- Area code: 620
- FIPS code: 20-76175
- GNIS ID: 2804502

Wayside is a census-designated place (CDP) in Montgomery County, Kansas, United States. As of the 2020 census, the population was 19. It is located along U.S. Route 75, northeast of Caney and southwest of Independence.

== History ==
A post office was opened in Wayside in 1887, and remained in operation until it was discontinued in 1984.

Approximately 2 miles east of Wayside, along Laura Ingalls Wilder Rd, is the original location of the Little House on the Prairie, the Kansas home of Laura Ingalls Wilder; a reconstruction of the house, along with a museum and relocated period buildings, are located at this site. Their 3rd daughter, Carrie, was born here on August 3, 1870.

== Geography ==
Wayside appears on the Tyro U.S. Geological Survey topographic quadrangle. Montgomery County is in the Central Time Zone (UTC -6 hours).

== Demographics ==
Historical population
Census	Pop.	Note	%±
2020	19		—
U.S. Decennial Census

== Education ==
The community is served by Caney Valley USD 436 public school district.

Wayside High School was closed through school unification. The Wayside High School mascot was Panthers.
