= Hartford Baptist Church =

Historic site in Washington County, New York

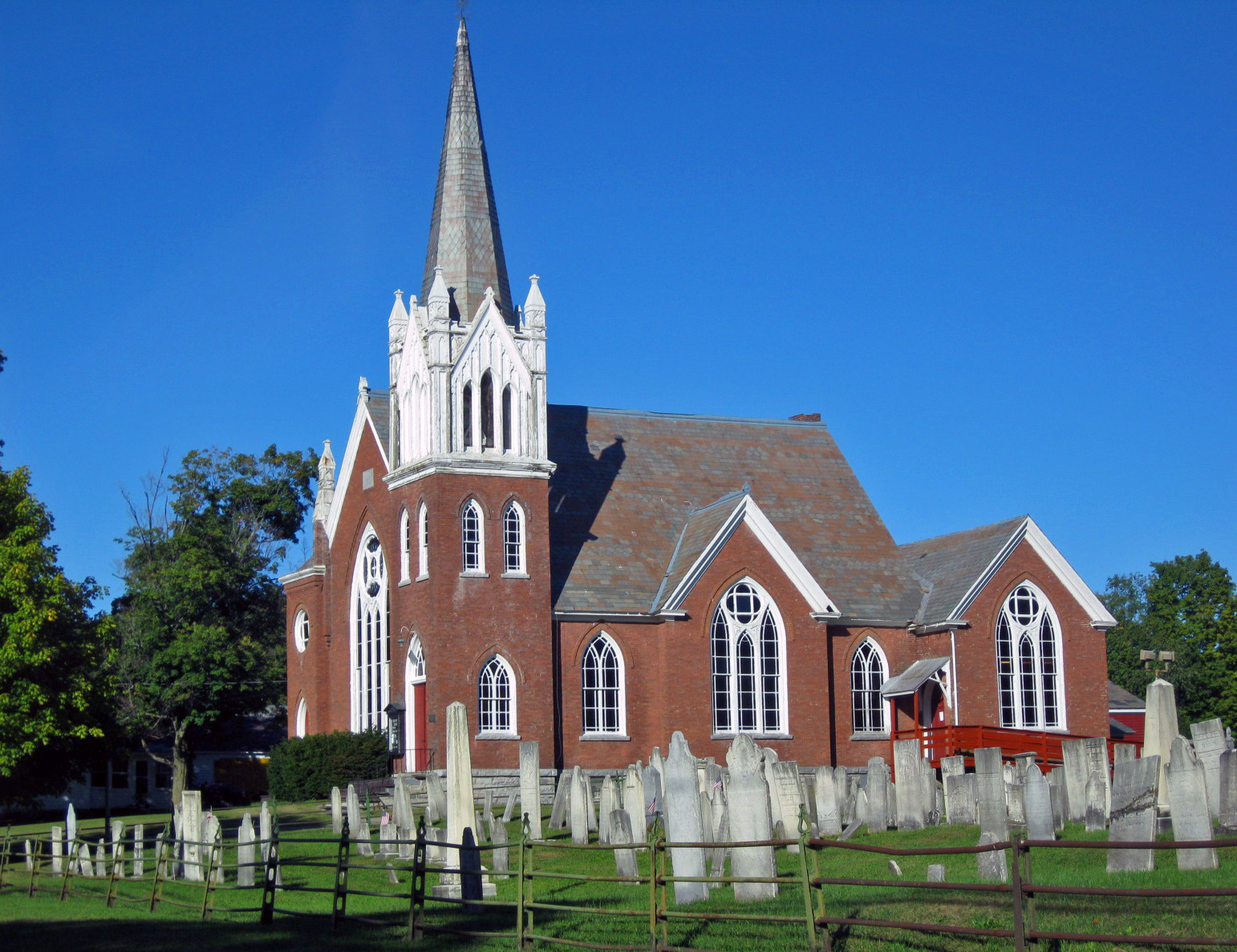
- West elevation and south profile, with cemetery in foreground, 2009

Religion
- Affiliation: Baptist
- Year consecrated: 1891

Location
- Location: Hartford, NY, USA
- Interactive map of Hartford Baptist Church
- Coordinates: 43°21′52″N 73°23′35″W

Architecture
- Architect: Benjamin D. Price
- Style: Victorian Gothic
- General contractor: A.M. Wilson
- Groundbreaking: 1890
- Completed: 1891
- Construction cost: $9,000

Specifications
- Direction of façade: west
- Capacity: 300
- Length: 56 feet (17 m)
- Width: 77 feet (23 m)
- Width (nave): 40 feet (12 m)
- Height (max): 85 feet (26 m)
- Spire: 2
- Spire height: 40 feet (12 m)
- Materials: Stone, brick, wood, slate

U.S. National Register of Historic Places
- Added to NRHP: 2004
- NRHP Reference no.: 04000875

The Hartford Baptist Church is located on Main Street (Washington County Route 23) in Hartford, New York, United States. It is a brick church with tall wooden bell tower built in the late 19th century on the same site as the congregation's original 1789 church on land deeded to it by Dewitt Clinton, the fourth of its churches to occupy the site. Designed by Philadelphia architect Benjamin Price, it is the only Victorian Gothic church in the town, and one of a few in the county. Next to the church is a cemetery with almost two centuries of graves, including those of early Hartford settlers and some Revolutionary War veterans.

Its members were active in a number of 19th century social causes. They passed anti-Masonic resolutions in the 1820s and 1830s, recruited local soldiers into the Union Army out of fervent abolitionism and later suffered the burning of their third church due to their advocacy of temperance and support for local dry laws. In 2004 the church and cemetery were added to the National Register of Historic Places.

== Property ==
The church and cemetery occupy a 4.4-acre (1.8 ha) lot on the eastern side of Main Street at the northern end of downtown Hartford. A small row of trees separates it from the houses to the north. Across the road rises 480-foot (150 m) Christian Hill; the church grounds sloping gently down to the east. The cemetery is located to the south and east of the church building. To its north and west are the remaining footings of an earlier, larger church on the site.

=== Church ===
Two intersecting gabled sections form the church's main block. A rubblestone and bluestone exposed foundation, which itself sits on solid rock (shale in some sections), supports the church. From it rise walls sided in brick veneer to a roof sided in Granville slate, 50 feet (15 m) high at its crest. Two bell towers rise on either side of the west (front) facade, the higher southern one reaching 85 feet (26 m) tall with a weathervane on top and a 908-pound (412 kg) Meneely bell within. All elevations have lancet windows in a combination of tracery and plate tracery.

The entrances from the two towers lead to vestibules, while the main entrance leads to a space between them. The sanctuary, 33 by 48 feet (10 by 15 m), referred to as the building's auditorium, has the pews, still the original white oak with black cherry trim, facing north instead of east, reflecting the influence of the New England meetinghouse tradition. They are arranged in a semicircle, with the floor rising 1 inch (2.5 cm) for every two feet (50 cm) radiating out from the pulpit, making the bottom of the rear seats approximately 18 inches (46 cm) higher than the pulpit base. They are affixed to 2¼-inch (6 cm) maple tongue-in-groove decking, kerfed to allow them to radiate outward, and nailed directly to the floor joists.

On the whole, the interior woodworking follows the Eastlake style. The pulpit, however, is more Renaissance Revival. Fashioned of walnut with a burled walnut veneer on its raised arch panels, with a dentil-molded top, it is set on a 30-inch (76 cm) platform, extending from a 23-foot–tall (7 m) arch in the wall behind it. The baptistery is behind it, separated by a large door on a pulley system. Its floor is wide-planked tongue-in-groove pine, with a simple baluster. The baptistery's full-immersion brick cistern reaches to the basement floor.

The walls are of King Windsor cement, with pine window casings and trim and cypress doors. They lead to a ceiling, 29 feet (8.8 m) high, paneled in native spruce wainscoting. At the ceiling are four trusses with windbeams.

The rear wing was originally a "lesson room", but has since been converted into a kitchen and meeting room. It is connected to the auditorium by a swinging double door. From a rear alcove a wheelchair ramp has been built.

=== Cemetery ===
The earliest recorded burial in the cemetery is that of Abraham Downs, an early settler of the Hartford area, in 1792. Language in the deed refers to it as a burying ground, suggesting the possibility of earlier burials. Other notable early burials include 19 men who fought in the Revolutionary War, including Col. John Buck, the first European settler of Hartford. He served under George Washington as a teenager for three years, seeing action at Bunker Hill and Groton Heights as well as surviving the difficult winter at Valley Forge. At the age of 83, he was honored by "handing" the inscription on the monument at Concord, Massachusetts. Also among the veterans of the Revolution in the cemetery is the Rev. Amasa Brown, the church's first pastor.

The last burial took place in 1989, after which the cemetery was closed to any further occupants for maintenance reasons. In addition to the Revolution, veterans buried in it served in the French and Indian War, Civil War and World Wars I and II.

Gravestones from the late 18th and early 19th centuries show the transition of funerary art from the early settlers' New England origins to a more local form. The cemetery also has an unusual burial mound for its Civil War veterans, rare and possibly unique for the area. It was created the day before Memorial Day in 1879, when the townspeople saw that other communities were erecting elaborate monuments to their war dead and veterans. Hartford lacked the money, and so the mound was created in a day.

== History ==
There have been four buildings and two name changes in the history of the church. During the 19th century it was locally involved in some major national issues, including the debate over slavery that culminated in the Civil War.

=== 1787–1850 ===
The congregation was formed as the Westfield Baptist Society in 1787. Westfield was the original town that comprised both present-day Hartford and neighboring Fort Ann. With the end of the Revolution, settlement of the region that had started before it once the end of the French and Indian War made it safe resumed in earnest. Many of the settlers came from central Connecticut, hence the town's name for that state's capital.

They brought the Baptist and Congregationalist faiths with them. A farmhouse near the present church hosted the new organization's first services. Two years later, in 1789, the first church was built, a log cabin known as the First Church of Westfield, just south of the present site. In 1793, when the Town of Hartford was created, the church changed its name as well.

Another of the first settlers was David Austin, land agent for DeWitt Clinton, who had bought many large tracts in the area. Upon his election to the New York State Senate in 1798, Clinton deeded two acres (8,000 m^{2}) to the society for one cent. The deed refers to the church and burial ground, suggesting the church was already using the land for that purpose. It was not recorded at the county courthouse in Hudson Falls until 1932.

The deed also specifically mentions The Rev. Amasa Brown, pastor of the church. Under his leadership, it almost tripled in membership by 1806. A new church was built in 1805 to handle this growth. Brown was a veteran of the Revolution, he served as the local regiment's chaplain when it served in northern New York during the War of 1812. When he returned, he oversaw the construction of a new church in 1815–16 with room for 700 worshippers. Six years later, the congregation had grown more conservative, and dismissed him in 1821 over doctrinal differences. When he died in 1830, he was nevertheless buried in the yard of the church he had helped to build.

In the ensuing decade, differences of opinion on contemporary social issues continued to cause rifts in the congregation. Members passed three strongly worded Anti-Masonic resolutions. However, many of its prominent members were themselves Masons, including the pastor. In the year that Brown died, 80 members withdrew from the congregation and started a second church. They built themselves a new building in 1833, three years after their founding.

Ten years later, the two pastors reunited their congregations. The second church, just opposite the cemetery, was sold to the Methodist Episcopal congregation in 1844 and continues to be used for that purpose. The reunified church, now part of the Washington Union Baptist Association with other congregations in the county, soon found other issues to replace anti-Masonry, which had died out. In 1850 the church passed another resolution stating that it would not have a minister who owned slaves and that slaveowners would not be welcome to sit at the church's communion table with them.

=== 1850–present ===
When the Civil War started a decade later, the church thus strongly supported the Union. Abolitionist rallies at the church led the young men who attended to cross the street to a local cabinetmaker's house that had become a recruiting center. After four such rallies, 65 young men, more than the town's quota, had enlisted. They made farewell speeches at the church, marched to the green at the center of town where the war monument is today, and after a final blessing there went to catch the train to Washington at Salem, where together with a detachment from the neighboring town of Hebron they formed Company E of the 123rd New York Regiment.

After the war, in 1870, the congregation decided to expand the church again. The cellar was dug out and space was added that brought the building's capacity to a thousand people. Friction among members over the new baptistry led to another split in the congregation. This one was much shorter than the 1830–43 split, and did not lead to the formal establishment of a new church.

Tensions continued among the congregants as the late 19th-century temperance movement gathered social and political momentum. It was particularly strong in central Washington County, where the Prohibition Party began regularly running candidates for the state legislature. In 1887, local temperance advocates succeeded in making Hartford, as well as other communities, a dry town. Some of the church's women formed the local chapter of the Women's Christian Temperance Union immediately afterward. The congregation itself remained divided. One Sunday morning in the spring of 1890, just before services, the church was burned to the ground. A local newspaper, the Granville Sentinel, reported that the fire had been set by someone angry about recent prosecutions of unlicensed liquor dealers.

Many of the church's interior contents, including the pulpit, church records and some of its furniture, had been saved. But the church had not been insured, and the cost of rebuilding was tremendous. The entire Hartford community worked to raise the money, as did some of its expatriates. Troy businessman William Rowe, a Hartford native, contributed generously and got others from the region who had gone south to make their fortune to do so as well. He is probably responsible for getting Benjamin Price, who had a thriving mail-order design business, involved.

Fundraising was successful enough that the entire $9,000 ($322,000 in contemporary dollars) was paid by the time it was finished. Another benefactor, James Northup, a wealthy local potato farmer who had served in the State Assembly, contributed another thousand dollars and the Meneely bell the following year, 1892.

The new church was smaller than the one it replaced, with less than a third of its seating. The area's population had begun to decline, and that continued into the 20th century. It was not necessary to expand it as it had been with its predecessors; the only physical changes made were the fire that burned the original parsonage in 1922 and the demolition of the sheds to the rear in 1955. By that time membership had dwindled to the point that Hartford shared its pastor with another area church. As the 21st century began, a new minister and board of trustees worked to preserve and reinvigorate the church.

== See also ==
- National Register of Historic Places listings in Washington County, New York
