= Caney Valley USD 436 =

Public school district in Caney, Kansas

Address
- 700 E. Bullpup Blvd. Caney, Kansas, 67333; United States
- Coordinates: 37°1′5″N 95°55′37″W

District information
- Type: Public
- Grades: K to 12
- Schools: 2

Other information
- Website: caney.com

Caney Valley USD 436 is a public unified school district headquartered in Caney, Kansas, United States. The district includes the communities of Caney, Havana, Niotaze, Tyro, Wayside, and nearby rural areas.

== Schools ==
The school district operates the following schools:

- Caney Valley Jr/Sr High School.
- Lincoln Memorial Elementary School.

== See also ==
- Kansas State Department of Education
- Kansas State High School Activities Association
- List of high schools in Kansas
- List of unified school districts in Kansas
