= Wanakena Presbyterian Church =

Historic church in New York, United States

- U.S. National Register of Historic Places
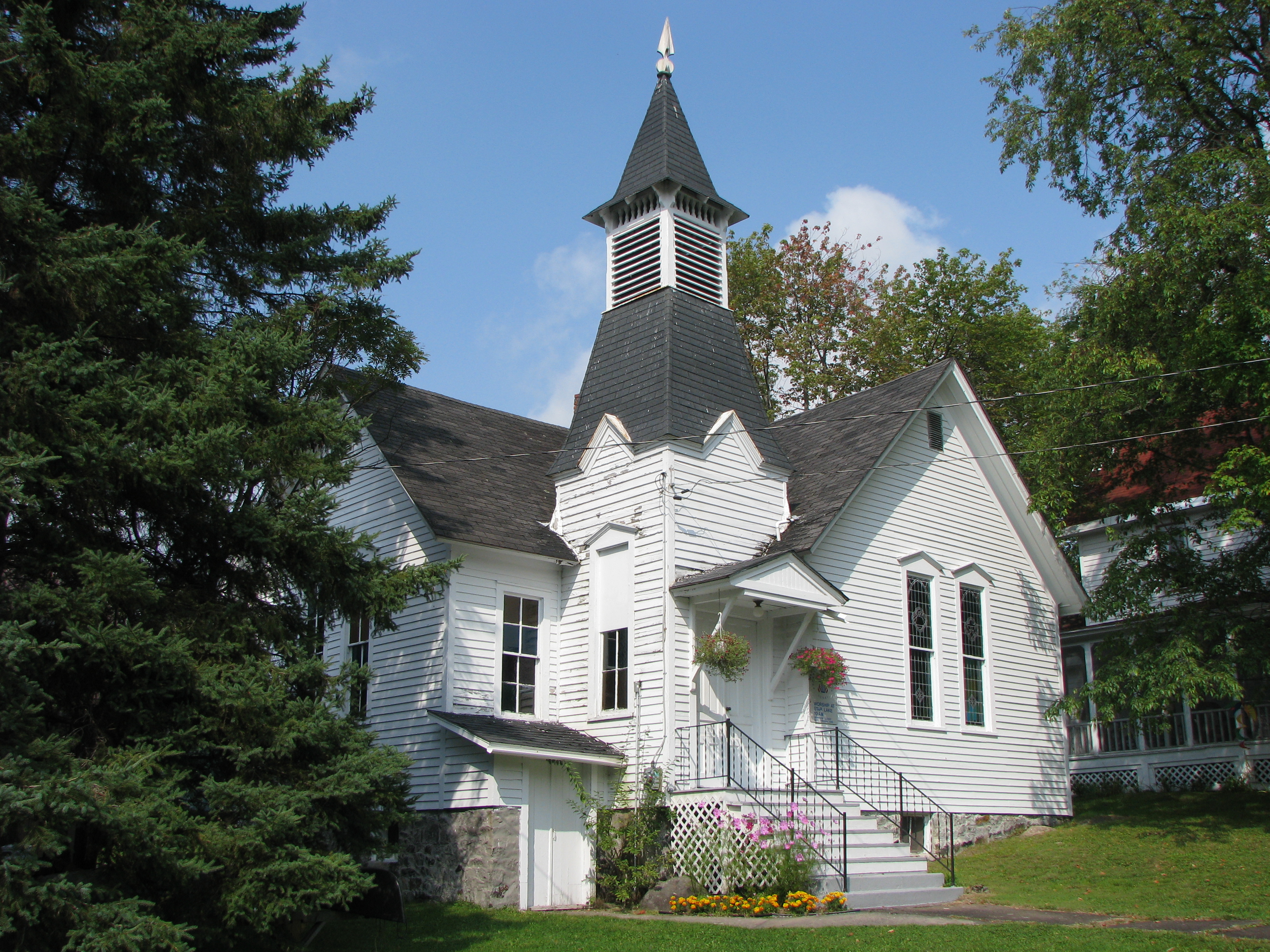
- Western Adirondack Presbyterian Church, September 2008

- Location within New York Location within the United States
- Location: 32 Second St., Wanakena, New York
- Coordinates: 44°8′9″N 74°55′18″W
- Area: less than one acre
- Built: 1903
- Built by: Rich Lumber Company
- Architect: Price, Benjamin D.
- Architectural style: Late Victorian
- NRHP reference No.: 07001015
- Added to NRHP: September 28, 2007

Wanakena Presbyterian Church, also known as Mount Lebanon Presbyterian Church and Western Adirondack Presbyterian Church, is a historic Presbyterian church located at Wanakena in St. Lawrence County, New York. It was built in 1903 and is a "steepled ell" plan with its steepled entry tower located at the intersection of the two volumes. The tower has a louvered belfry topped by a pyramidal roof.

Its design is attributed to church plan catalogue architect Benjamin D. Price.

It was listed on the National Register of Historic Places in 2007.
