= Mount Zion Memorial Church =

Historic church in Maryland, United States

- Mt. Zion Memorial Church
- U.S. National Register of Historic Places
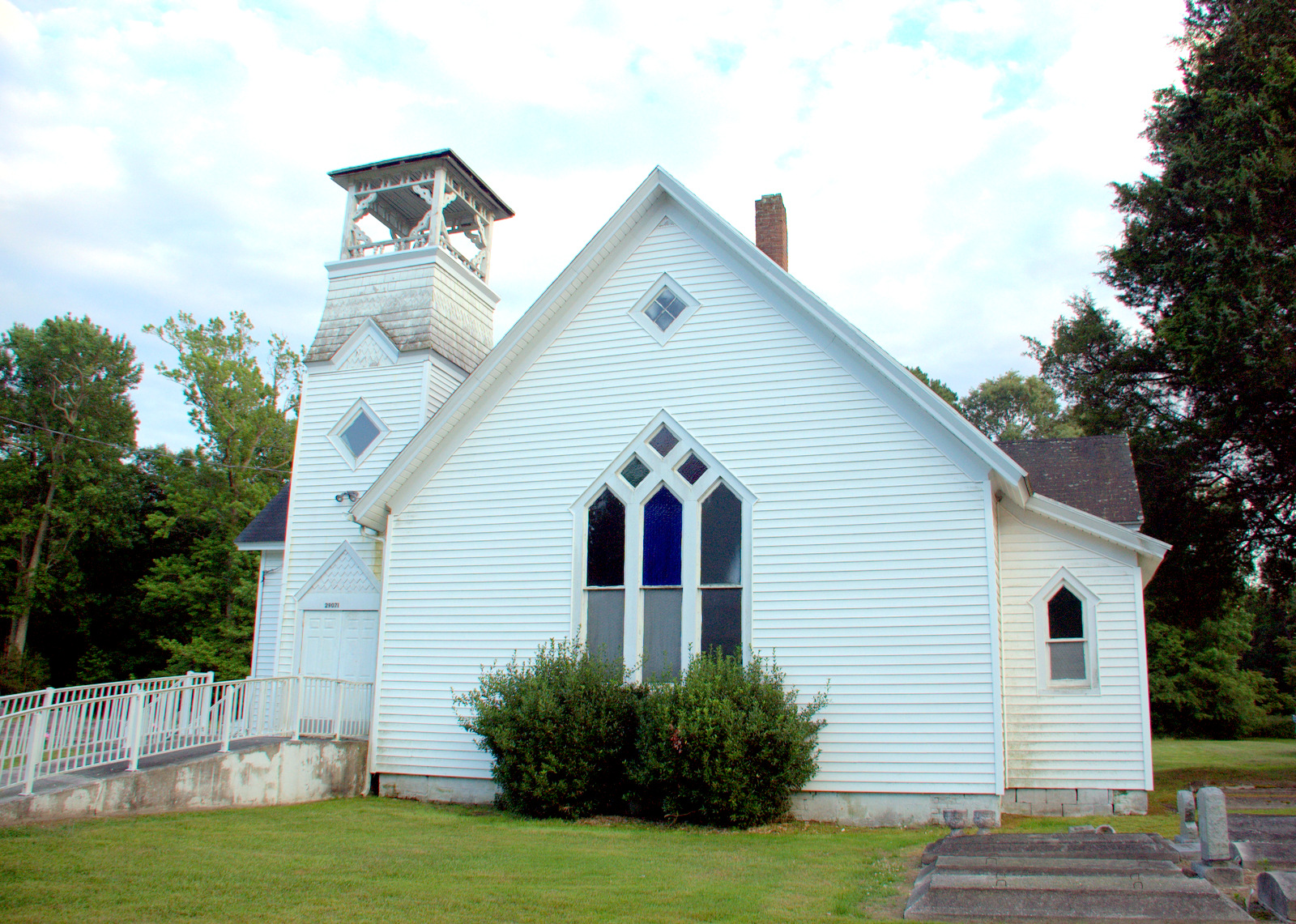

- Location within Maryland Location within the United States
- Location: 29071 Polks Road; Princess Anne, Maryland
- Coordinates: 38°15′37″N 75°44′38″W
- Area: 2.5 acres (1.0 ha)
- Architect: Price, Benjamin D.
- Architectural style: Gothic
- NRHP reference No.: 07001116
- Added to NRHP: November 1, 2007

Mt. Zion Memorial Church, also known as Mt. Zion Methodist Episcopal Church or Mt. Zion United Methodist Church, is a historic Methodist Episcopal church located at Princess Anne, Somerset County, Maryland. It is a single-story asymmetrically planned T-shaped timber-frame structure constructed in 1887 and remodeled in 1916. It features a three-story entrance tower with an open belfry. It served the African-American community along Polks Road in northern Somerset County.

Its design is attributed to architect Benjamin D. Price, who sold church plans by catalogue orders.

It was listed on the National Register of Historic Places in 2007.
