= First Christian Church (Nashville, Arkansas) =

Historic church in Arkansas, United States

- Formerly listed on the U.S. National Register of Historic Places
- Location within Arkansas Location within the United States
- Location: N. Main St., Nashville, Arkansas
- Coordinates: 33°56′55″N 93°50′47″W
- Area: less than one acre
- Built: 1911
- Architect: Benjamin D. Price, Max Charles Price
- Architectural style: Late Gothic Revival
- NRHP reference No.: 82000831

Significant dates
- Added to NRHP: November 4, 1982
- Removed from NRHP: September 24, 2010

The First Christian Church on N. Main St. in Nashville, Arkansas, was built in 1911. It was a work of the noted church architect Benjamin D. Price and his son Max Charles Price. It was listed on the National Register of Historic Places in 1982. It was removed from the National Register in 2010 due to major alterations to the building
