= Kenneth McFarland =

Educator, public speaker, writer, and conservative commentator

Dr. Kenneth McFarland
- Born: October 12, 1906; Caney, Kansas
- Died: March 6, 1985 (aged 78); Topeka, Kansas
- Occupations: Public speaker Commentator; Educator - Superintendent of Topeka Schools during Brown v. Board of Education
- Spouse: Margaret E. Thrall McFarland (m. 1927)
- Children: James W. McFarland, Chief Justice of Kansas, the Honorable Kay McFarland

Kenneth W. McFarland (October 12, 1906 – March 6, 1985) born in Caney, Kansas was an educator, public speaker, writer and conservative commentator. An early conservative, Kenneth McFarland was the public school superintendent for Coffeyville, Kansas where he founded the McFarland Trade School. Later he was hired as superintendent of the Topeka, Kansas school system, the school system in the landmark case Brown v. Board of Education 347 U.S. 483 (1954) McFarland was reportedly a staunch supporter of the political and racial status quo of the time.

== Early life and education ==
Born in the small southeastern Kansas town of Caney, Kenneth McFarland received a bachelor's degree from Pittsburg State College of Kansas in 1927. He received his Master's degree at Columbia University in 1931 and a doctorate from Stanford University in 1940.

== Educational administration ==
After teaching history for a year in a high school in his native Montgomery County following his graduation from college, McFarland was appointed the superintendent of the Quincy schools. He held the job for three years while studying for his master's in the summers.

McFarland then served as principal in Cherryvale and then superintendent of schools in Coffeyville and Anthony. While at the former position he also became recognized as a capable speaker, and began giving speeches to civic groups for additional income. He designed and built a trade school in Coffeyville named in his honor. The McFarland Trade School changed its name in 1965 to the Southeast Kansas Area Vocational-Technical School.

=== Topeka tenure ===
In 1942, following conferral of his doctorate, he was appointed superintendent of schools in Topeka, the state capital. He was soon able to concentrate all authority over the school system, previously scattered among the school board's disparate committees, in himself. Once he had done so, he focused on two policy goals: reorienting the high school curriculum toward vocational education from a more college-preparatory approach, and keeping expenses down as much as possible. Many of the teachers he promoted to principal and assistant administrator positions were former coaches, who tended to have similar views of the role of education in local life as he did.

McFarland also gained the favor of Topeka's civic and community leaders through his devotion to another aspect of the status quo: maintaining what racial segregation existed in the city's schools. Kansas permitted, but did not require, cities above a certain size to establish separate schools for Black and White students. Topeka had separate elementary schools; the year before McFarland was appointed superintendent the district had integrated its junior high school.

Students of both races attended Topeka High School but were segregated within it, with Black students in their own classes taught by Black teachers, playing on separate athletic teams and having a separate student council. Both Black students and their teachers were under the supervision of Harrison Caldwell, a Black colleague of McFarland's from Pittsburg who had worked with him in Coffeyville as well. Caldwell enforced segregation strictly, regularly patrolling the school cafeteria at lunchtime to make sure Black students did not sit with their White classmates; he also implicitly threatened the Black teachers with dismissal (as had happened to the Black teachers at the junior high following its integration) if they advocated for further integration and held regular Black-only assemblies where he lectured the students on what is now called respectability politics.

When Black parents and activists pressed for further integration, McFarland said Topeka was not yet ready for it. He never expressed any prejudicial opinion, at least not publicly, but Southeastern Kansas during his childhood there had been known as the part of the state where racism was strongest. Caldwell and other Blacks who believed that their community benefited from Topeka's lighter segregation since the schools there, unlike many in the South, took the judicial "separate but equal" mandate more seriously. In his own later speeches about the subject, McFarland took most of his guidance from Booker T. Washington, arguing that America could only guarantee equal opportunity.

In the late 1940s McFarland began to take more time away from his duties as superintendent to go on nationwide speaking tours, the proceeds from which he used to assemble a large horse farm on the west side of Topeka where he and his wife lived. This increased prominence led to talk that he might run for governor. But, along with the continuing segregation at the schools and McFarland's authoritarian governance of the district, it also aroused resentment in Topeka. In 1951 his political opponents supported a slate of three candidates for the six-member school board to oppose incumbents who were staunch supporters of the superintendent.

McFarland's supporters campaigned vigorously, afraid that another administration might not be as invested in defending segregation in the recently filed Brown v. Board of Education lawsuit as his was. The opponents called for a "full-time superintendent". The month before the election, the Topeka Daily Capital, having fought off an effort in the state legislature to restrict access to the audit financial records of the state's school districts, obtained and published Topeka's.

Those records showed that for years, the district had engaged in troublesome financial practices despite the repeated admonitions from the auditors to stop doing so. The allegations centered around $75,000 in student-fee money, held in the central office and spent for a variety of purposes, not always properly accounted for. Some were related-party transactions, such as a $3,000 purchase of furniture from a company owned by McFarland's secretary's husband, an amount well over the $200 threshold state law at the time required be covered by a contract executed by the school board, which had not been made.

McFarland's supporters claimed the report was politically timed to embarrass him. Two days after the election, in which all three incumbents lost, McFarland announced his resignation effective in August, at the end of the school year. He would henceforth concentrate his career on his speaking engagements.

== Public speaker ==
From the 1950s McFarland was engaged as a public speaker and lecturer for the General Motors Corporation, and Reader's Digest. He received numerous awards from politically conservative civic and business-oriented organizations for his support of free enterprise and salesmanship.

== Author ==
McFarland authored the speaking guide, "Eloquence in Public Speaking, How to Set Your Words on Fire" (1963). He also published 26 addresses recorded live. His speeches consistently used humor, as well as engaging speaking techniques of alliteration (astronaut to tall space alien: "Take me to your ladder lady, I'll see your leader later!") and vocal techniques to make for remarkable speeches such as his "Ropes of Gold," "The Lamplighters," "America's Opportunity," "Wake the Town and Tell the People," "Selling America to Americans," "The Eagle Has Landed," and "America's Opportunity."

Along with Frank Emerson Harris, he produced a series of booklets on the preservation of "basic Americanism," regarded as an expression of modern political conservatism.

== Recorded speeches ==
- America's Opportunity (Bicentennial - 1976–1989)
- Are We Raising the Red Flag Over Ourselves?
- Guarding America Tonight
- Horse Sense
- How is America Doing?
- Ladder To Success
- Leadership that Leads
- Let's Sell Success
- Liberty Under Law
- Public Speaking - Part One
- Public Speaking - Part Two
- Ropes of Gold
- Salesman Power
- Selling America to Americans
- Speak Up For America!
- Sure-Fire Selling
- The Best of McFarland's Humor, Vol I
- The Best of McFarland's Humor, Vol II
- The Best of McFarland on Insurance
- The Best of McFarland for Salesmen
- The Lamplighters
- The MAN in SalesMAN
- Wake The Town and Tell the People
- Who Bites the Bountiful Hand
- Who Will Succeed...?
- You Better Believe It

== Awards ==
According to his published obituary McFarland received many prestigious speaking awards:

- Freedom Foundation's National Leadership Award and Free Enterprise Exemplar Medal
- American Academy of Achievement's Golden Plate Award
- Honorary Member: America's Number One Rotary Club, Chicago
- America's Number One Air Passenger (for flying more than any other passenger on American Airlines)
- Sales and Marketing Executives International's Outstanding Salesman of America
- Honorary Member, Fraternal Order of Police
- Optimist International's Highest Honor: The International President's Award
- Toastmaster International's Golden Gavel Award for Excellence in Communications and Leadership
- Named Quote Magazine's list of 10 Most Quotable Public Speakers
