= Tyro, Kansas =

City in Montgomery County, Kansas

- City
- Location within Montgomery County and Kansas

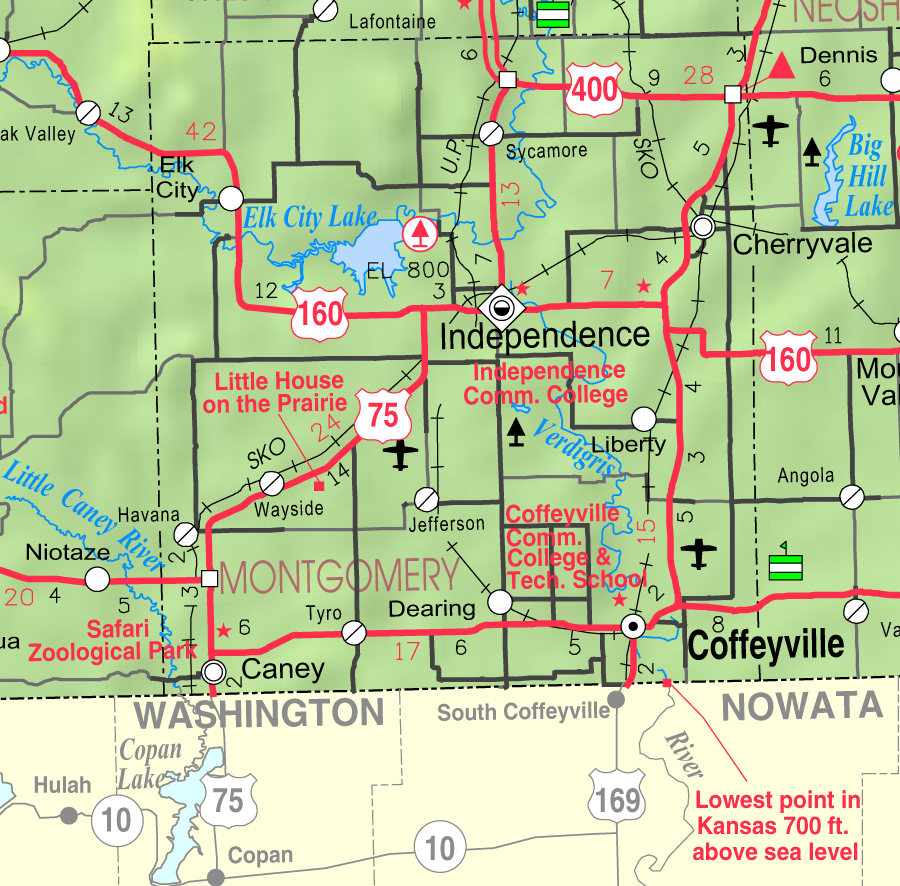
- KDOT map of Montgomery County (legend)
- Coordinates: 37°02′12″N 95°49′18″W
- Country: United States
- State: Kansas
- County: Montgomery
- Founded: 1886
- Platted: 1886
- Incorporated: 1906
- Named for: Princess Tyro in Greek mythology

Area
  - Total: 0.52 sq mi (1.35 km^{2})
  - Land: 0.52 sq mi (1.34 km^{2})
  - Water: 0.0039 sq mi (0.01 km^{2})
- Elevation: 902 ft (275 m)

Population (2020)
  - Total: 177
  - Density: 342/sq mi (132/km^{2})
- Time zone: UTC-6 (CST)
  - Summer (DST): UTC-5 (CDT)
- ZIP Code: 67364
- Area code: 620
- FIPS code: 20-71925
- GNIS ID: 2397076
- Website: City website

Tyro is a city in Montgomery County, Kansas, United States. As of the 2020 census, the population of the city was 177.

== History ==
Tyro was laid out in the fall of 1886 when the Denver, Memphis & Atlantic railroad was first extended to that point. It was named from the English word tyro, which also means "beginner" or "novice".

Tyro was incorporated as a city in 1906.

== Geography ==
Tyro is located at 37°2′9″N 95°49′18″W (37.035742, -95.821679). According to the United States Census Bureau, the city has a total area of 0.53 square miles (1.37 km^{2}), all land.

== Demographics ==
Historical population
Census	Pop.	Note	%±
1910	603		—
1920	454		−24.7%
1930	272		−40.1%
1940	322		18.4%
1950	279		−13.4%
1960	289		3.6%
1970	206		−28.7%
1980	289		40.3%
1990	243		−15.9%
2000	226		−7.0%
2010	220		−2.7%
2020	177		−19.5%
U.S. Decennial Census

=== 2010 census ===
As of the census of 2010, there were 220 people, 88 households, and 61 families residing in the city. The population density was 415.1 inhabitants per square mile (160.3/km^{2}). There were 106 housing units at an average density of 200.0 per square mile (77.2/km^{2}). The racial makeup of the city was 87.3% White, 1.4% African American, 5.9% Native American, 0.5% Asian, and 5.0% from two or more races. Hispanic or Latino of any race were 0.9% of the population.

There were 88 households, of which 34.1% had children under the age of 18 living with them, 53.4% were married couples living together, 9.1% had a female householder with no husband present, 6.8% had a male householder with no wife present, and 30.7% were non-families. 27.3% of all households were made up of individuals, and 11.3% had someone living alone who was 65 years of age or older. The average household size was 2.50 and the average family size was 3.00.

The median age in the city was 40.4 years. 25.5% of residents were under the age of 18; 7.3% were between the ages of 18 and 24; 25% were from 25 to 44; 29% were from 45 to 64; and 13.2% were 65 years of age or older. The gender makeup of the city was 48.6% male and 51.4% female.

=== 2000 census ===
As of the census of 2000, there were 226 people, 90 households, and 64 families residing in the city. The population density was 428.0 inhabitants per square mile (165.3/km^{2}). There were 105 housing units at an average density of 198.9 per square mile (76.8/km^{2}). The racial makeup of the city was 90.71% White, 0.44% African American, 5.31% Native American, and 3.54% from two or more races. Hispanic or Latino of any race were 0.44% of the population.

There were 90 households, out of which 37.8% had children under the age of 18 living with them, 60.0% were married couples living together, 7.8% had a female householder with no husband present, and 27.8% were non-families. 26.7% of all households were made up of individuals, and 16.7% had someone living alone who was 65 years of age or older. The average household size was 2.51 and the average family size was 3.00.

In the city, the population was spread out, with 27.9% under the age of 18, 5.3% from 18 to 24, 29.2% from 25 to 44, 21.7% from 45 to 64, and 15.9% who were 65 years of age or older. The median age was 38 years. For every 100 females, there were 88.3 males. For every 100 females age 18 and over, there were 79.1 males.

The median income for a household in the city was $27,750, and the median income for a family was $30,250. Males had a median income of $22,250 versus $15,556 for females. The per capita income for the city was $9,608. About 10.4% of families and 17.4% of the population were below the poverty line, including 22.5% of those under the age of eighteen and 6.9% of those 65 or over.

== Education ==
The community is served by Caney Valley USD 436 public school district.
