= Niotaze Methodist Episcopal Church =

Historic church in Kansas, United States

- U.S. National Register of Historic Places
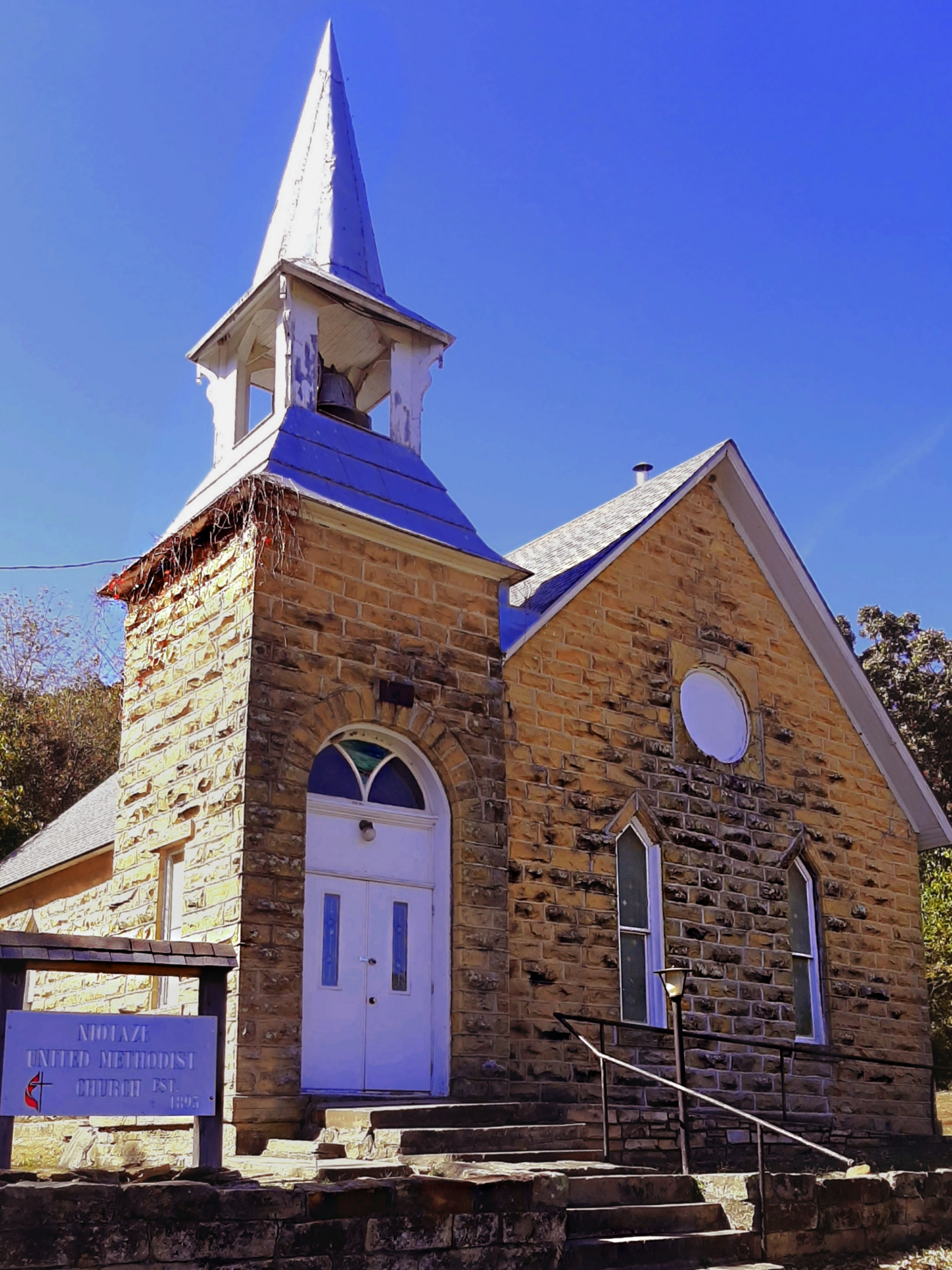

- Location within Kansas Location within the United States
- Location: 301 N. F St. Niotaze, Kansas
- Coordinates: 37°4′12″N 96°0′54″W
- Area: less than one acre
- Built: 1895
- Built by: S.A. Burson
- Architect: Benjamin D. Price
- NRHP reference No.: 05001512
- Added to NRHP: January 11, 2006

Niotaze Methodist Episcopal Church (also known as Odell Memorial Methodist Episcopal Church and as Niotaze United Methodist Church) is a historic church at 301 N. F Street in Niotaze, Kansas. It was designed by the noted church architect Benjamin D. Price, was built in about 1895. It was added to the National Register in 2006.

It is a one-story 28 by 48 feet (8.5 m × 14.6 m) one-room front-gabled church. It is built of rusticated sandstone blocks on a sandstone foundation.
