= Havana, Kansas =

City in Montgomery County, Kansas

- City
- Location within Montgomery County and Kansas

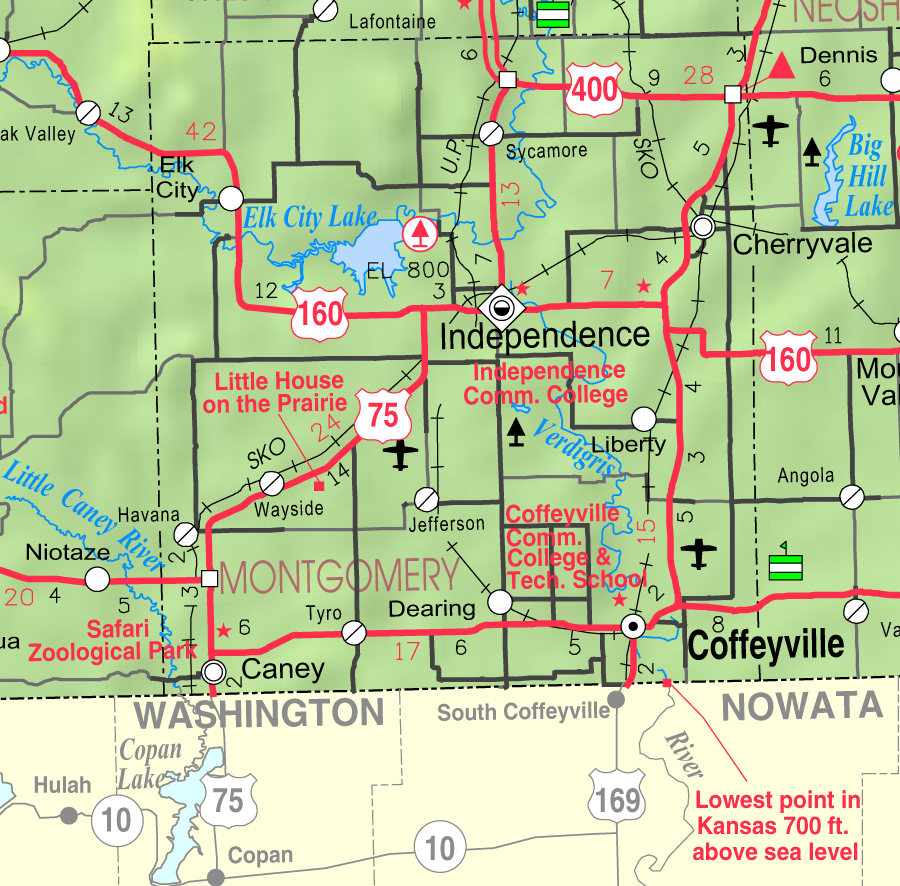
- KDOT map of Montgomery County (legend)
- Coordinates: 37°05′32″N 95°56′31″W
- Country: United States
- State: Kansas
- County: Montgomery
- Founded: 1870
- Incorporated: 1909
- Named for: Havana, Illinois

Area
  - Total: 0.16 sq mi (0.41 km^{2})
  - Land: 0.16 sq mi (0.41 km^{2})
  - Water: 0 sq mi (0.00 km^{2})
- Elevation: 761 ft (232 m)

Population (2020)
  - Total: 84
  - Density: 530/sq mi (200/km^{2})
- Time zone: UTC-6 (CST)
  - Summer (DST): UTC-5 (CDT)
- ZIP Code: 67347
- Area code: 620
- FIPS code: 30700
- GNIS ID: 2394324

Havana is a city in Montgomery County, Kansas, United States. As of the 2020 census, the population of the city was 84.

== History ==
Havana was founded about 1870, when a general store was built there. It was named after Havana, Illinois. The first post office in Havana was established in 1871.

Havana experienced growth in 1886 when the Atchison, Topeka and Santa Fe Railway was extended to that point. It incorporated as a city in 1910.

== Geography ==
According to the United States Census Bureau, the city has a total area of 0.13 square miles (0.34 km^{2}), all land.

== Demographics ==
Historical population
Census	Pop.	Note	%±
1910	227		—
1920	318		40.1%
1930	289		−9.1%
1940	253		−12.5%
1950	215		−15.0%
1960	162		−24.7%
1970	144		−11.1%
1980	169		17.4%
1990	121		−28.4%
2000	86		−28.9%
2010	104		20.9%
2020	84		−19.2%
U.S. Decennial Census

=== 2020 census ===
The 2020 United States census counted 84 people, 37 households, and 27 families in Havana. The population density was 535.0 per square mile (206.6/km^{2}). There were 44 housing units at an average density of 280.3 per square mile (108.2/km^{2}). The racial makeup was 88.1% (74) white or European American (86.9% non-Hispanic white), 0.0% (0) black or African-American, 7.14% (6) Native American or Alaska Native, 1.19% (1) Asian, 0.0% (0) Pacific Islander or Native Hawaiian, 0.0% (0) from other races, and 3.57% (3) from two or more races. Hispanic or Latino of any race was 3.57% (3) of the population.

Of the 37 households, 32.4% had children under the age of 18; 45.9% were married couples living together; 35.1% had a female householder with no spouse or partner present. 21.6% of households consisted of individuals and 13.5% had someone living alone who was 65 years of age or older. The average household size was 2.3 and the average family size was 2.9. The percent of those with a bachelor's degree or higher was estimated to be 3.6% of the population.

19.0% of the population was under the age of 18, 4.8% from 18 to 24, 20.2% from 25 to 44, 33.3% from 45 to 64, and 22.6% who were 65 years of age or older. The median age was 49.5 years. For every 100 females, there were 100.0 males. For every 100 females ages 18 and older, there were 100.0 males.

The 2016–2020 5-year American Community Survey estimates show that the median household income was $29,167 (with a margin of error of +/- $26,185) and the median family income was $57,917 (+/- $24,354). Approximately, 17.6% of families and 23.5% of the population were below the poverty line, including 0.0% of those under the age of 18 and 14.3% of those ages 65 or over.

=== 2010 census ===
As of the census of 2010, there were 104 people, 47 households, and 30 families residing in the city. The population density was 800.0 inhabitants per square mile (308.9/km^{2}). There were 63 housing units at an average density of 484.6 per square mile (187.1/km^{2}). The racial makeup of the city was 93.3% White, 2.9% Native American, and 3.8% from two or more races.

There were 47 households, of which 19.1% had children under the age of 18 living with them, 53.2% were married couples living together, 10.6% had a male householder with no wife present, and 36.2% were non-families. 29.8% of all households were made up of individuals, and 19.1% had someone living alone who was 65 years of age or older. The average household size was 2.21 and the average family size was 2.73.

The median age in the city was 50 years. 14.4% of residents were under the age of 18; 8.7% were between the ages of 18 and 24; 20.2% were from 25 to 44; 32.6% were from 45 to 64; and 24% were 65 years of age or older. The gender makeup of the city was 50.0% male and 50.0% female.

=== 2000 census ===
As of the census of 2000, there were 86 people, 42 households, and 25 families residing in the city. The population density was 640.1 inhabitants per square mile (247.1/km^{2}). There were 55 housing units at an average density of 409.4 per square mile (158.1/km^{2}). The racial makeup of the city was 90.70% White, 4.65% Native American, and 4.65% from two or more races.

There were 42 households, out of which 19.0% had children under the age of 18 living with them, 45.2% were married couples living together, 14.3% had a female householder with no husband present, and 38.1% were non-families. 35.7% of all households were made up of individuals, and 11.9% had someone living alone who was 65 years of age or older. The average household size was 2.05 and the average family size was 2.62.

In the city, the population was spread out, with 18.6% under the age of 18, 5.8% from 18 to 24, 24.4% from 25 to 44, 34.9% from 45 to 64, and 16.3% who were 65 years of age or older. The median age was 46 years. For every 100 females, there were 115.0 males. For every 100 females age 18 and over, there were 100.0 males.

The median income for a household in the city was $30,625, and the median income for a family was $34,107. Males had a median income of $25,313 versus $17,083 for females. The per capita income for the city was $14,996. There were no families and 6.7% of the population living below the poverty line, including 8.3% of under eighteens and 19.2% of those over 64.

== Education ==
The community is served by Caney Valley USD 436 public school district.
