= Niotaze, Kansas =

City in Chautauqua County, Kansas

- City
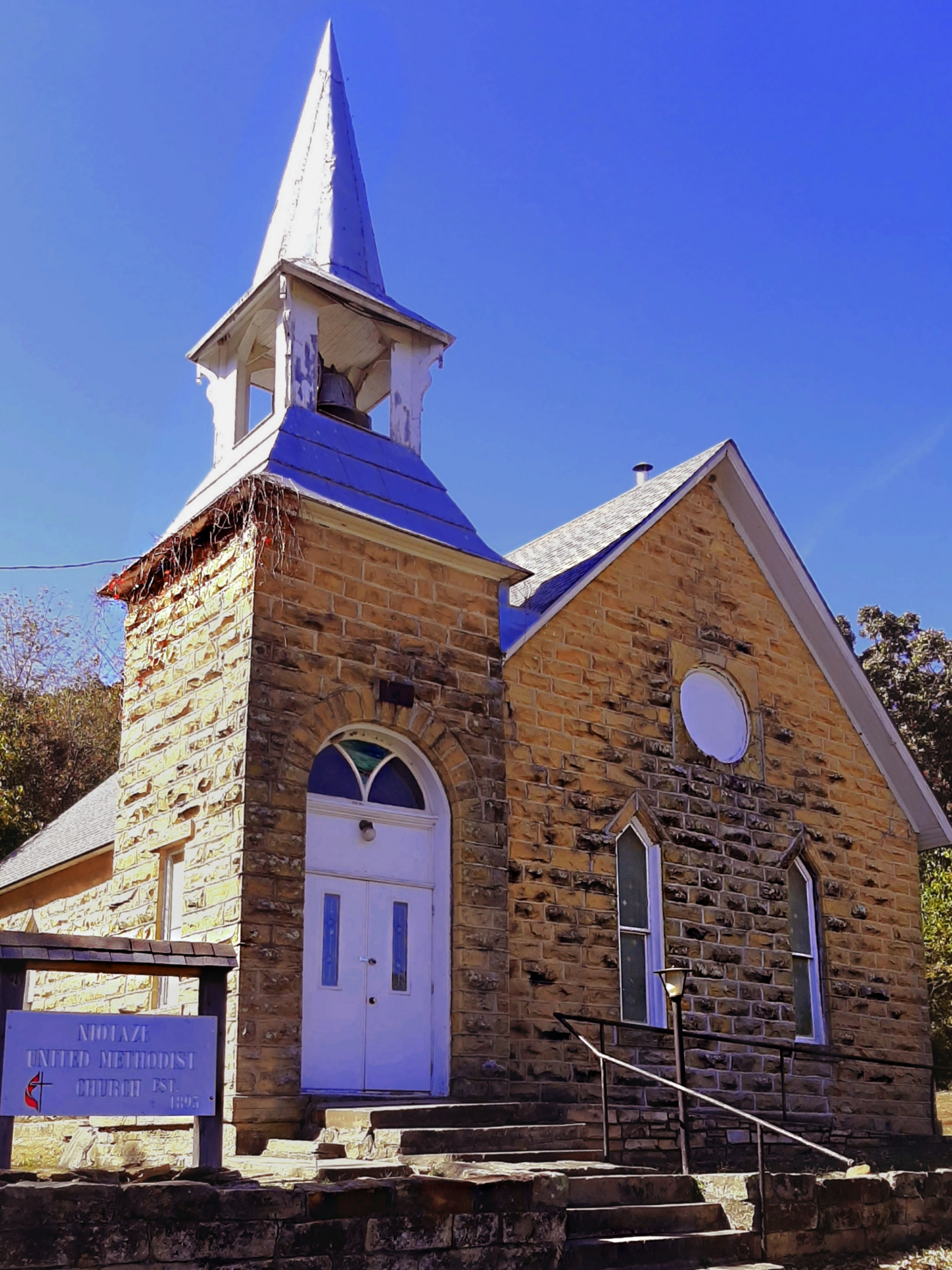
- 1895 Niotaze Methodist Episcopal Church

- Location within Chautauqua County and Kansas

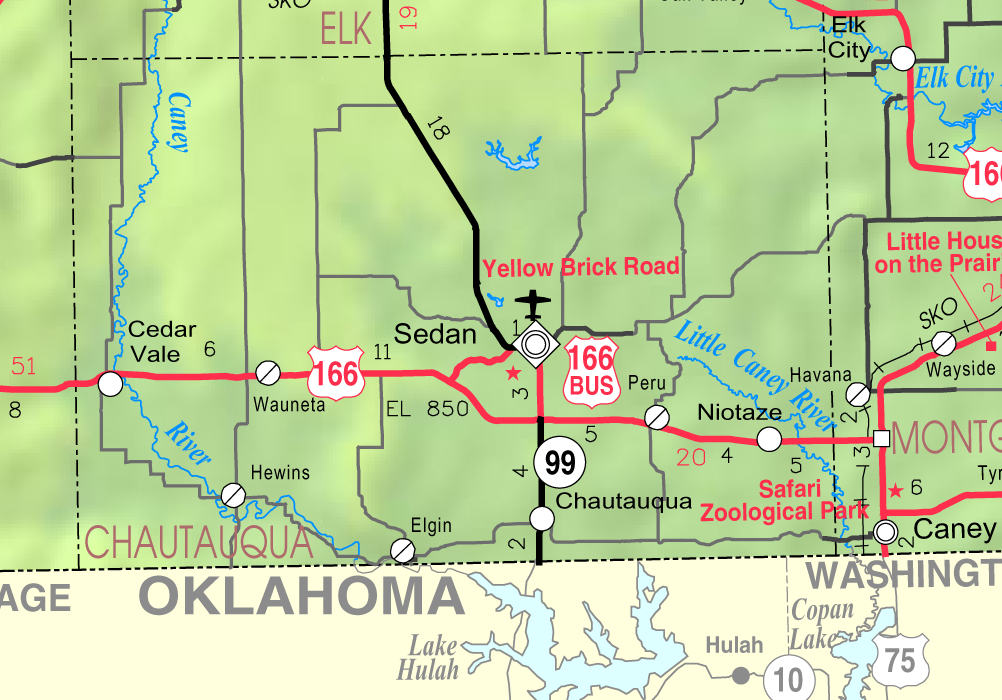
- KDOT map of Chautauqua County (legend)
- Coordinates: 37°04′04″N 96°00′53″W
- Country: United States
- State: Kansas
- County: Chautauqua
- Incorporated: 1910

Area
  - Total: 0.37 sq mi (0.96 km^{2})
  - Land: 0.37 sq mi (0.96 km^{2})
  - Water: 0 sq mi (0.00 km^{2})
- Elevation: 758 ft (231 m)

Population (2020)
  - Total: 90
  - Density: 240/sq mi (94/km^{2})
- Time zone: UTC-6 (CST)
  - Summer (DST): UTC-5 (CDT)
- ZIP Code: 67355
- Area code: 620
- FIPS code: 20-50750
- GNIS ID: 2395237

Niotaze is a city in Chautauqua County, Kansas, United States. As of the 2020 census, the population of the city was 90.

== History ==
Niotaze probably derived its name from Niota, Illinois or Niota, Tennessee.

Circa 1910, Niotaze had a population of 317. At that time it was an important shipping point for grain, livestock and produce at the junction of two railroads.

== Geography ==
According to the United States Census Bureau, the city has a total area of 0.37 square miles (0.96 km^{2}), all land.

== Demographics ==
Historical population
Census	Pop.	Note	%±
1910	317		—
1920	186		−41.3%
1930	235		26.3%
1940	241		2.6%
1950	162		−32.8%
1960	124		−23.5%
1970	83		−33.1%
1980	104		25.3%
1990	99		−4.8%
2000	122		23.2%
2010	82		−32.8%
2020	90		9.8%
U.S. Decennial Census

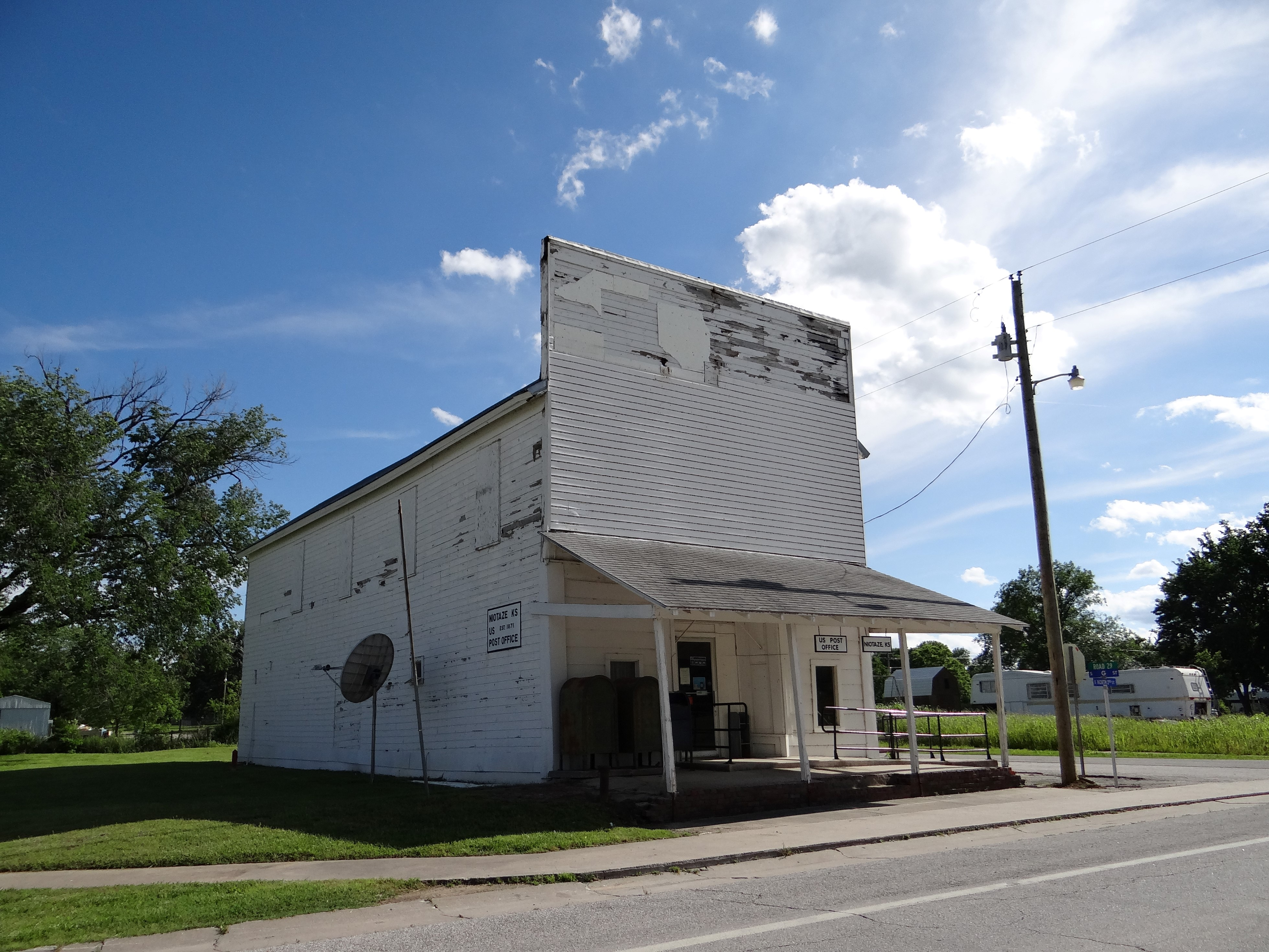
Former U.S. Post Office (2013)

=== 2020 census ===
The 2020 United States census counted 90 people, 30 households, and 20 families in Niotaze. The population density was 243.2 per square mile (93.9/km^{2}). There were 41 housing units at an average density of 110.8 per square mile (42.8/km^{2}). The racial makeup was 60.0% (54) white or European American (60.0% non-Hispanic white), 0.0% (0) black or African-American, 18.89% (17) Native American or Alaska Native, 0.0% (0) Asian, 0.0% (0) Pacific Islander or Native Hawaiian, 1.11% (1) from other races, and 20.0% (18) from two or more races. Hispanic or Latino of any race was 3.33% (3) of the population.

Of the 30 households, 33.3% had children under the age of 18; 43.3% were married couples living together; 13.3% had a female householder with no spouse or partner present. 16.7% of households consisted of individuals and 3.3% had someone living alone who was 65 years of age or older. The average household size was 1.9 and the average family size was 1.8. The percent of those with a bachelor's degree or higher was estimated to be 6.7% of the population.

28.9% of the population was under the age of 18, 6.7% from 18 to 24, 22.2% from 25 to 44, 24.4% from 45 to 64, and 17.8% who were 65 years of age or older. The median age was 38.3 years. For every 100 females, there were 100.0 males. For every 100 females ages 18 and older, there were 88.2 males.

The 2016–2020 5-year American Community Survey estimates show that the median household income was $60,893 (with a margin of error of +/- $577) and the median family income was $60,923 (+/- $553). Females had a median income of $13,438 (+/- $12,925). The median income for those above 16 years old was $14,063 (+/- $12,570). Approximately, 9.5% of families and 23.3% of the population were below the poverty line, including 100.0% of those under the age of 18 and 0.0% of those ages 65 or over.

=== 2010 census ===
As of the census of 2010, there were 82 people, 33 households, and 22 families residing in the city. The population density was 221.6 inhabitants per square mile (85.6/km^{2}). There were 49 housing units at an average density of 132.4 per square mile (51.1/km^{2}). The racial makeup of the city was 85.4% White, 7.3% Native American, and 7.3% from two or more races.

There were 33 households, of which 33.3% had children under the age of 18 living with them, 54.5% were married couples living together, 6.1% had a female householder with no husband present, 6.1% had a male householder with no wife present, and 33.3% were non-families. 33.3% of all households were made up of individuals, and 18.2% had someone living alone who was 65 years of age or older. The average household size was 2.48 and the average family size was 3.09.

The median age in the city was 42 years. 25.6% of residents were under the age of 18; 2.4% were between the ages of 18 and 24; 24.4% were from 25 to 44; 25.7% were from 45 to 64; and 22% were 65 years of age or older. The gender makeup of the city was 57.3% male and 42.7% female.

=== 2000 census ===
As of the census of 2000, there were 122 people, 47 households, and 32 families residing in the city. The population density was 327.6 inhabitants per square mile (126.5/km^{2}). There were 55 housing units at an average density of 147.7 per square mile (57.0/km^{2}). The racial makeup of the city was 90.16% White, 5.74% Native American, and 4.10% from two or more races. Hispanic or Latino of any race were 6.56% of the population.

There were 47 households, out of which 34.0% had children under the age of 18 living with them, 57.4% were married couples living together, 6.4% had a female householder with no husband present, and 29.8% were non-families. 29.8% of all households were made up of individuals, and 12.8% had someone living alone who was 65 years of age or older. The average household size was 2.60 and the average family size was 3.24.

In the city, the population was spread out, with 30.3% under the age of 18, 6.6% from 18 to 24, 27.0% from 25 to 44, 21.3% from 45 to 64, and 14.8% who were 65 years of age or older. The median age was 36 years. For every 100 females, there were 139.2 males. For every 100 females age 18 and over, there were 112.5 males.

The median income for a household in the city was $27,500, and the median income for a family was $27,679. Males had a median income of $17,500 versus $9,583 for females. The per capita income for the city was $9,738. There were 21.6% of families and 29.0% of the population living below the poverty line, including 45.8% of under eighteens and 35.3% of those over 64.

== Education ==
The community is served by Caney Valley USD 436 public school district.

== Infrastructure ==
=== Transportation ===
U.S. Route 166 highway currently runs east–west through the community.

=== Rail ===
Previously two railroads, Santa Fe and Missouri Pacific, went through the community, but both lines have been abandoned.
