= Caney, Kansas =

City in Montgomery County, Kansas

- City
- Location within Montgomery County and Kansas

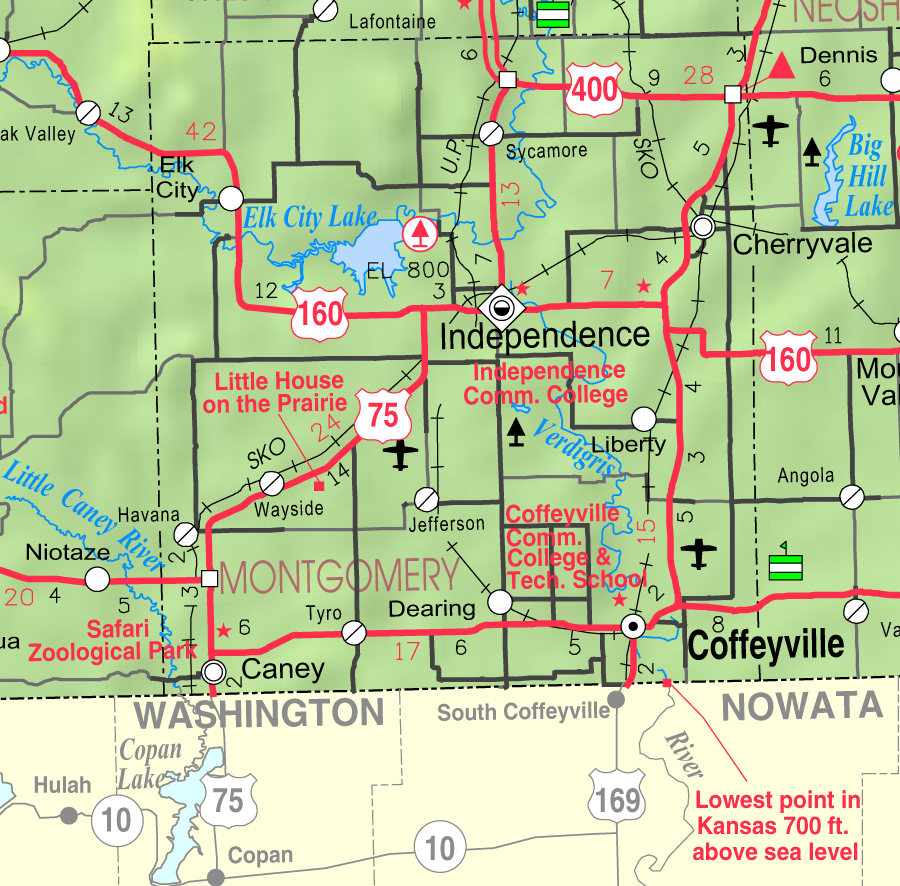
- KDOT map of Montgomery County (legend)
- Coordinates: 37°00′50″N 95°55′53″W
- Country: United States
- State: Kansas
- County: Montgomery
- Founded: 1869
- Incorporated: 1887
- Named for: Caney River

Area
  - Total: 1.35 sq mi (3.50 km^{2})
  - Land: 1.35 sq mi (3.50 km^{2})
  - Water: 0 sq mi (0.00 km^{2})
- Elevation: 778 ft (237 m)

Population (2020)
  - Total: 1,788
  - Density: 1,320/sq mi (511/km^{2})
- Time zone: UTC-6 (CST)
  - Summer (DST): UTC-5 (CDT)
- ZIP Code: 67333
- Area code: 620
- FIPS code: 20-10375
- GNIS ID: 485551
- Website: caneyks.com

Caney is a city in Montgomery County, Kansas, United States. As of the 2020 census, the population of the city was 1,788.

== History ==
Caney was founded in 1869. It was named from the Caney River. The first post office in Caney was established in May 1870.

In 1887, the Missouri Pacific railroad was built through Caney, and in that same year, the town was incorporated. By 1905 the Atchison, Topeka and Santa Fe Railway had also built through Caney. The two railroads served the city for much of the 19th century. Today only the former ATSF tracks remain, currently operated by the South Kansas and Oklahoma Railroad.

Caney has long been associated with the petroleum industry in Kansas. In 1906, a major gas well fire took place in this area. In 1909, Caney became the site of the original Kanotex Refining Company. Currently, CVR Energy's pipeline system can transport up to 145,000 barrels/day of crude oil from Caney to that company's refinery in Coffeyville, Kansas.

Caney Kansas: "A March attempt to cover the huge burning gas well six miles from here with a great iron hood upon which a week of preparation had been spent was made last night and failed. The hood with its attached pipes and weights weighing more than 35 tons was thrust aside, bent and broken by the mighty rush of gas and flames. The cap was placed partly over the stream of fire only after strenuous efforts and at great hardship to the men, the intensity from the heat slowing the effort; the gas spouted from the well with renewed force expelling rocks and shooting a flame over 150 feet into the air. Several thousand spectators drawn by the unusual spectacle came to Caney from all directions, the railways running in excursion trains. The well has now been burning for 15 days and millions of feet of gas have been burned."

— Van Wert Daily Bulletin, Van Wert, Ohio, March 12, 1906

== Geography ==
According to the United States Census Bureau, the city has a total area of 1.35 square miles (3.50 km^{2}), all land.

=== Climate ===
The climate in this area is characterized by hot, humid summers and generally mild to cool winters. According to the Köppen Climate Classification system, Caney has a humid subtropical climate, abbreviated "Cfa" on climate maps.

== Demographics ==
Historical population
Census	Pop.	Note	%±
1890	542		—
1900	887		63.7%
1910	3,597		305.5%
1920	3,427		−4.7%
1930	2,794		−18.5%
1940	2,629		−5.9%
1950	2,876		9.4%
1960	2,682		−6.7%
1970	2,192		−18.3%
1980	2,284		4.2%
1990	2,062		−9.7%
2000	2,092		1.5%
2010	2,203		5.3%
2020	1,788		−18.8%
U.S. Decennial Census

=== 2020 census ===
As of the 2020 census, Caney had a population of 1,788 people, 761 households, and 452 families. The population density was 1,322.5 inhabitants per square mile (510.6/km^{2}). There were 928 housing units at an average density of 686.4 per square mile (265.0/km^{2}).

The median age was 39.1 years. 26.3% of residents were under the age of 18, 6.7% were from 18 to 24, 25.1% were from 25 to 44, 23.8% were from 45 to 64, and 18.1% were 65 years of age or older. For every 100 females, there were 96.1 males, and for every 100 females age 18 and over, there were 89.5 males age 18 and over. 0.0% of residents lived in urban areas, while 100.0% lived in rural areas.

There were 761 households, of which 28.5% had children under the age of 18 living in them. Of all households, 39.9% were married-couple households, 20.5% were households with a male householder and no spouse or partner present, and 32.1% were households with a female householder and no spouse or partner present. About 35.1% of all households were made up of individuals and 19.0% had someone living alone who was 65 years of age or older. There were 928 housing units, of which 18.0% were vacant. The homeowner vacancy rate was 4.4% and the rental vacancy rate was 19.0%.

Racial composition as of the 2020 census
Race	Number	Percent
White	1,422	79.5%
Black or African American	5	0.3%
American Indian and Alaska Native	89	5.0%
Asian	9	0.5%
Native Hawaiian and Other Pacific Islander	4	0.2%
Some other race	31	1.7%
Two or more races	228	12.8%
Hispanic or Latino (of any race)	83	4.6%

The non-Hispanic White population was 78.02%.

=== Demographic estimates ===
The average household size was 2.2 and the average family size was 2.8. The percent of those with a bachelor's degree or higher was estimated to be 7.7% of the population.

The 2016–2020 5-year American Community Survey estimates show that the median household income was $38,056 (with a margin of error of +/- $8,864) and the median family income was $55,391 (+/- $7,385). Males had a median income of $38,281 (+/- $7,347) versus $22,321 (+/- $7,991) for females. The median income for those above 16 years old was $30,484 (+/- $5,669). Approximately, 13.3% of families and 14.9% of the population were below the poverty line, including 23.5% of those under the age of 18 and 6.6% of those ages 65 or over.

=== 2010 census ===
As of the census of 2010, there were 2,203 people, 866 households, and 574 families residing in the city. The population density was 1,631.9 inhabitants per square mile (630.1/km^{2}). There were 1,020 housing units at an average density of 755.6 per square mile (291.7/km^{2}). The racial makeup of the city was 86.2% White, 0.7% African American, 5.8% Native American, 0.2% Asian, 0.1% Pacific Islander, 0.9% from other races, and 6.0% from two or more races. Hispanic or Latino of any race were 5.1% of the population.

There were 866 households, of which 36.3% had children under the age of 18 living with them, 48.2% were married couples living together, 12.8% had a female householder with no husband present, 5.3% had a male householder with no wife present, and 33.7% were non-families. 30.0% of all households were made up of individuals, and 11.8% had someone living alone who was 65 years of age or older. The average household size was 2.48 and the average family size was 3.05.

The median age in the city was 35.9 years. 25.8% of residents were under the age of 18; 9.7% were between the ages of 18 and 24; 24.5% were from 25 to 44; 24.3% were from 45 to 64; and 15.8% were 65 years of age or older. The gender makeup of the city was 48.3% male and 51.7% female.

== Area events ==
Mayfest is a yearly gathering to celebrate School Alumni and the town's festivities along with the Fourth & Live Concert Series

The Caney Safari Zoological Park is a zoo that has many endangered animals.

== Education ==
The community is served by Caney Valley USD 436 public school district.

== Notable people ==
- Clancy Hayes, jazz musician
- Kenneth McFarland, educator and superintendent of schools for Topeka at the time of Brown v. Board of Education
- Glenn Shafer, statistician, co-developer of the Dempster-Shafer Theory
- Rosalie Wahl, former associate justice of the Minnesota Supreme Court
