= Hartford, New York =

Hartford
- Town
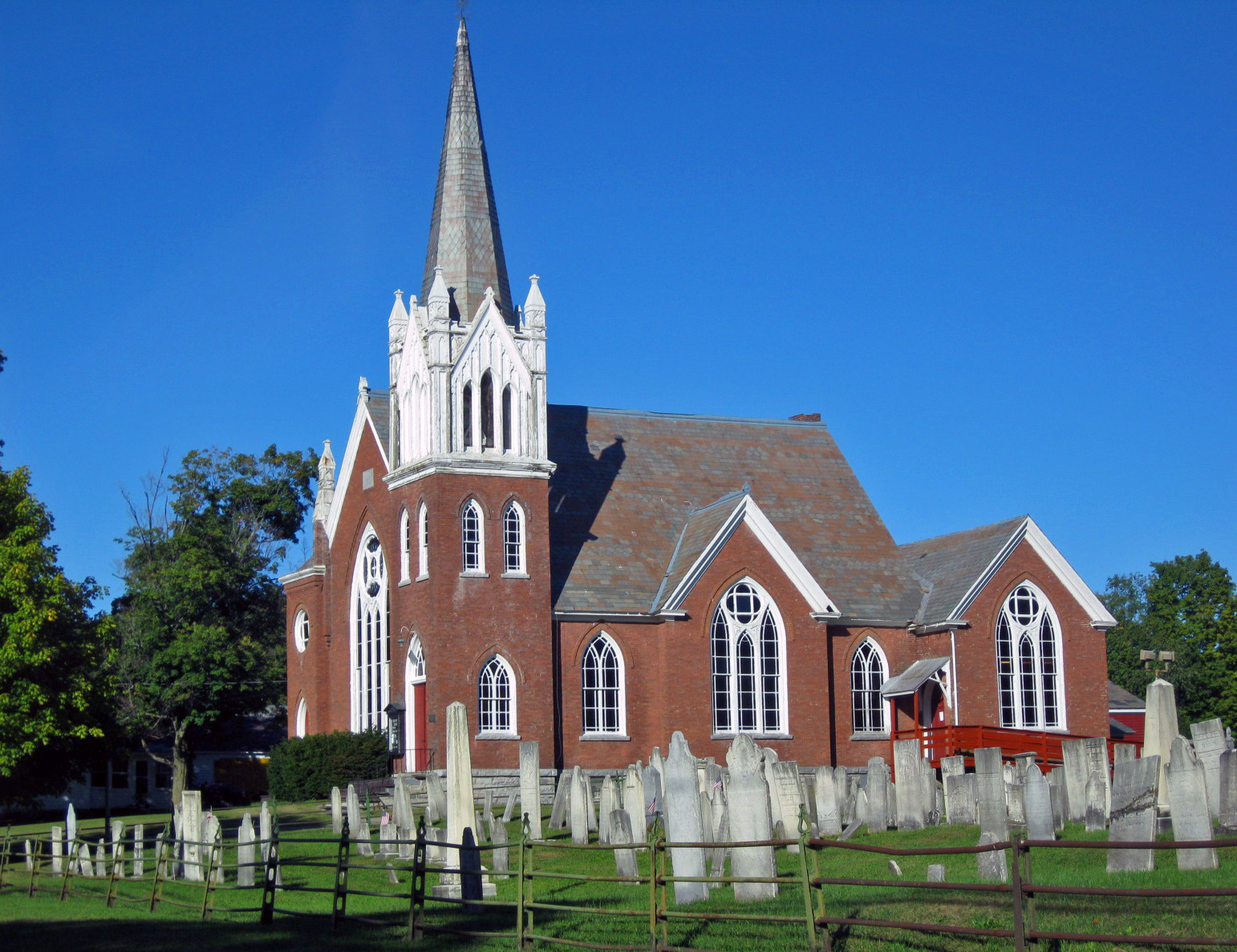
- Hartford Baptist Church and Cemetery

- Location in Washington County and the state of New York.
- Coordinates: 43°21′27″N 73°24′18″W
- Country: United States
- State: New York
- County: Washington

Area
  - Total: 43.48 sq mi (112.60 km^{2})
  - Land: 43.37 sq mi (112.33 km^{2})
  - Water: 0.10 sq mi (0.26 km^{2})
- Elevation: 230 ft (70 m)

Population (2020)
  - Total: 2,193
  - Density: 50.56/sq mi (19.52/km^{2})
- Time zone: UTC-5 (Eastern (EST))
  - Summer (DST): UTC-4 (EDT)
- ZIP code: 12838
- Area code: 518
- FIPS code: 36-32457
- GNIS feature ID: 0979053
- Website: Town website

Hartford is a town centrally located in Washington County, New York, United States. It is part of the Glens Falls Metropolitan Statistical Area. The town population was 2,193 at the 2020 census.

== History ==
The Provincial Patent (1766) was granted to officer veterans of the French and Indian War. The patent included, within the "Town of Westfield," the present towns of Putnam, Fort Ann, Dresden part of Kingsbury, and Hartford. The Town of Hartford was set off from Westfield in 1793. The Town of Westfield represents the Vermont claim for part of this region, which was eventually settled by the eastern part of Charlotte County being transferred from New York.

Many of the early settlers came from parts of New England. The land granted by the original patent was often sold to the new settlers.

The Hartford Baptist Church and Cemetery and Elisha Straight House are listed on the National Register of Historic Places.

== Geography ==
According to the United States Census Bureau, the town has a total area of 43.5 square miles (113 km^{2}), of which 43.4 square miles (112 km^{2}) is land and 0.04 square miles (0.10 km^{2}) (0.09%) is water.

NY 40 intersects NY 149 at the community of Hartford. NY 40 intersects NY 196 at South Hartford.

== Demographics ==
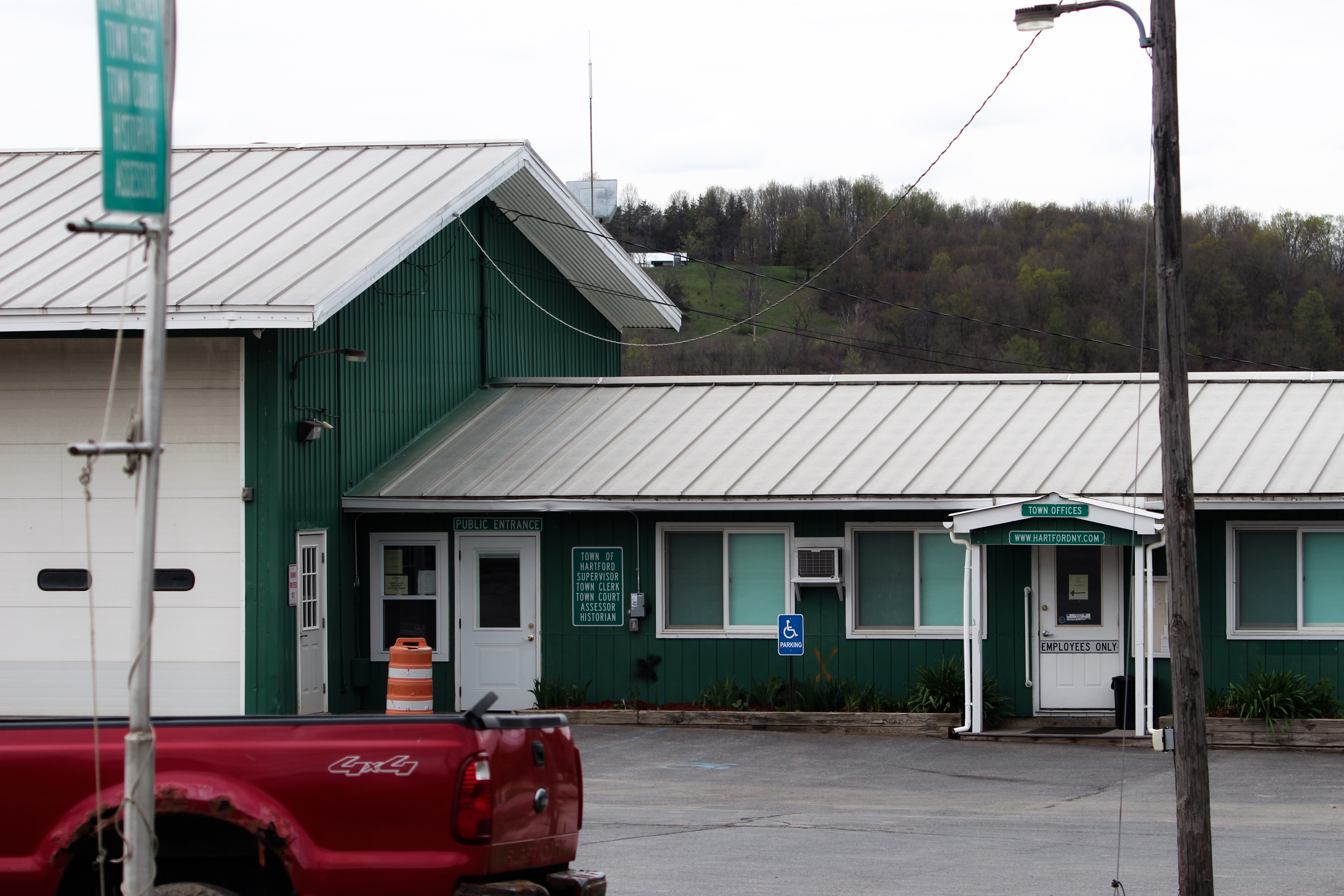
Hartford Town Hall

Historical population
Census	Pop.	Note	%±
1820	2,493		—
1830	2,420		−2.9%
1840	2,164		−10.6%
1850	2,051		−5.2%
1860	2,046		−0.2%
1870	1,980		−3.2%
1880	1,700		−14.1%
1890	1,470		−13.5%
1900	1,290		−12.2%
1910	1,216		−5.7%
1920	1,102		−9.4%
1930	1,102		0.0%
1940	1,088		−1.3%
1950	1,271		16.8%
1960	1,058		−16.8%
1970	1,398		32.1%
1980	1,742		24.6%
1990	1,989		14.2%
2000	2,279		14.6%
2010	2,269		−0.4%
2020	2,193		−3.3%
U.S. Decennial Census

As of the census of 2000, there were 2,279 people, 813 households, and 639 families residing in the town. The population density was 52.5 inhabitants per square mile (20.3/km^{2}). There were 885 housing units at an average density of 20.4 per square mile (7.9/km^{2}). The racial makeup of the town was 97.76% White, 0.57% African American, 0.48% Native American, 0.04% Asian, 0.04% from other races, and 1.10% from two or more races. Hispanic or Latino of any race were 0.79% of the population.

There were 813 households, out of which 39.2% had children under the age of 18 living with them, 65.7% were married couples living together, 9.1% had a female householder with no husband present, and 21.3% were non-families. 16.2% of all households were made up of individuals, and 6.3% had someone living alone who was 65 years of age or older. The average household size was 2.80 and the average family size was 3.11.

In the town, the population was spread out, with 28.7% under the age of 18, 6.1% from 18 to 24, 31.7% from 25 to 44, 24.3% from 45 to 64, and 9.1% who were 65 years of age or older. The median age was 35 years. For every 100 females, there were 102.2 males. For every 100 females age 18 and over, there were 97.8 males.

The median income for a household in the town was $43,684, and the median income for a family was $46,600. Males had a median income of $30,734 versus $19,906 for females. The per capita income for the town was $16,969. About 3.5% of families and 4.4% of the population were below the poverty line, including 1.4% of those under age 18 and 10.1% of those age 65 or over.

== Communities and locations in Hartford ==
- Adamsville – A hamlet at the western town line on NY-196.
- Big Creek – A small stream flowing out of the town at the western town boundary.
- East Hartford – A hamlet south of Hartford hamlet on County Route 30.
- Hartford – A hamlet on NY 40 and NY 149.
- South Hartford – A hamlet south of Hartford hamlet on NY 40.

== Notable person ==
- Sarah Bates (1792–1881), Shaker artist
