= Elisha Straight House =

Historic house in New York, United States

- U.S. National Register of Historic Places
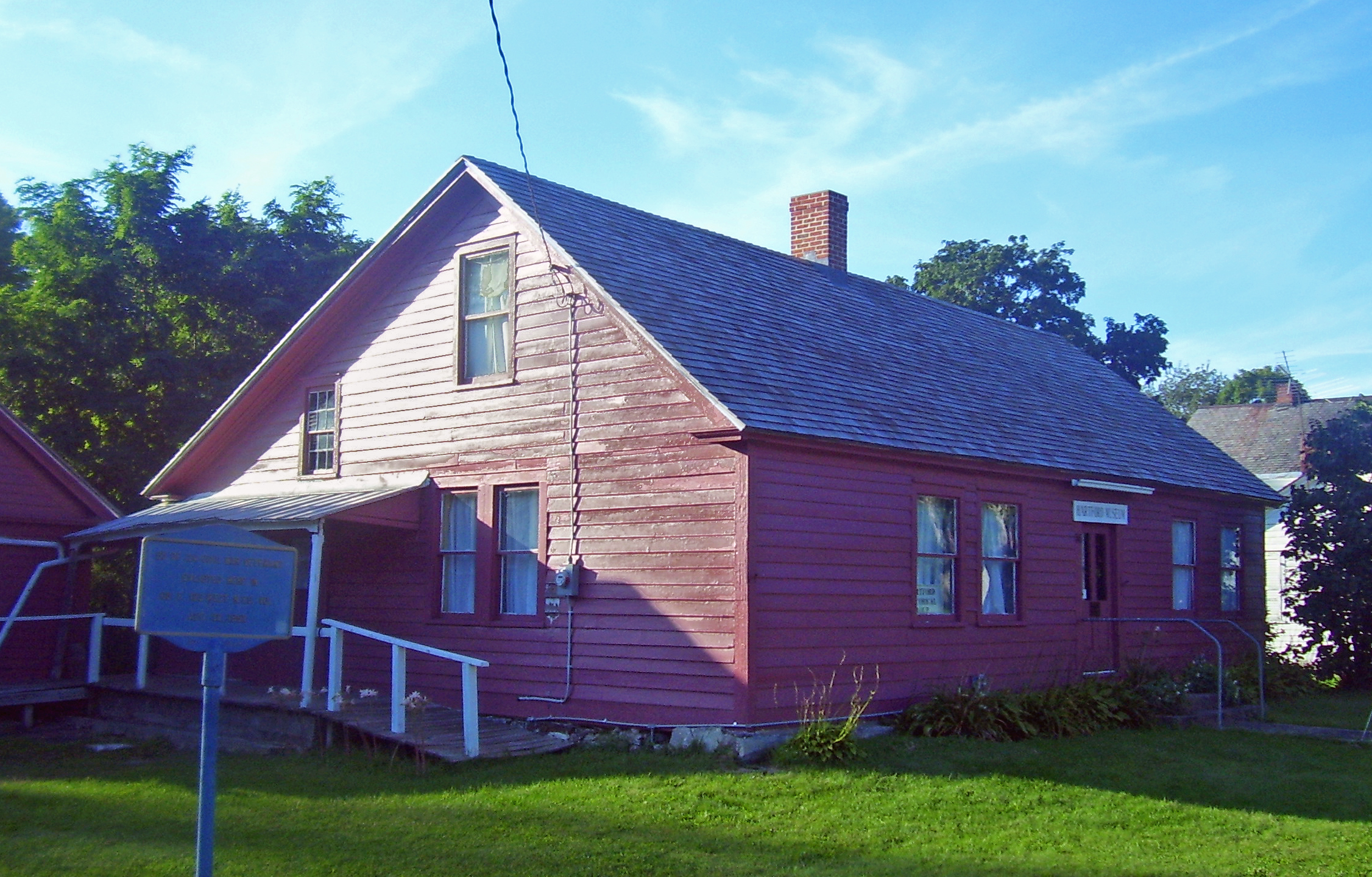
- South profile and east elevation, 2008

- Location within New York Location within the United States
- Location: Hartford, NY
- Nearest city: Hudson Falls
- Coordinates: 43°21′42″N 73°23′41″W
- Area: less than one acre
- Built: early 19th century
- Architectural style: Colonial, Greek Revival
- NRHP reference No.: 04000986
- Added to NRHP: September 15, 2004

The Elisha Straight House, now the Hartford Museum, is located on Main Street in Hartford, New York, United States, a short distance north of NY 149. It is a red wooden house dating to the early 19th century.

At the beginning of the Civil War it was used as a local recruitment center for the Union Army, since many local men wanted to serve due to strong abolitionist sentiment in the area. Today it is a local history museum. In 2004 it was listed on the National Register of Historic Places.

== See also ==
- National Register of Historic Places listings in Washington County, New York
