= Kansas =

U.S. state

- State
- Flag Seal
- Nicknames: The Sunflower State (official); The Wheat State; America's Heartland
- Motto(s): Ad astra per aspera (Latin); To the stars through difficulties
- Anthem: "Home on the Range"
- Location of Kansas within the United States
- Country: United States
- Before statehood: Kansas Territory
- Admitted to the Union: January 29, 1861; 165 years ago Kansas Day (34th)
- Capital: Topeka
- Largest city: Wichita
- Largest county or equivalent: Johnson
- Largest metro and urban areas: Kansas portion of Kansas City, MO-KS area (Note: The Kansas City area is the largest metropolitan and urban area in the state alone; however, the Wichita metropolitan area is the largest centered in the state.)

Government
  - Governor: Laura Kelly (D)
  - Lieutenant Governor: David Toland (D)
- Legislature: Legislature
  - Upper house: Senate
  - Lower house: House of Representatives
- Judiciary: Kansas Supreme Court
- U.S. senators: Jerry Moran (R); Roger Marshall (R)
- U.S. House delegation: 1: Tracey Mann (R); 2: Derek Schmidt (R); 3: Sharice Davids (D); 4: Ron Estes (R) (list)

Area
  - Total: 82,300 sq mi (213,100 km^{2})
  - Land: 81,759 sq mi (211,754 km^{2})
  - Water: 520 sq mi (1,346 km^{2}) 0.6%
  - Rank: 15th

Dimensions
  - Length: 210 mi (340 km)
  - Width: 400 mi (640 km)
- Elevation: 2,000 ft (610 m)
- Highest elevation (Mount Sunflower (Note: Elevation adjusted to North American Vertical Datum of 1988)): 4,042 ft (1,232 m)
- Lowest elevation (Verdigris River at Oklahoma border): 679 ft (207 m)

Population (2025)
  - Total: ▲2,977,220
  - Rank: 34th
  - Density: 35/sq mi (13.5/km^{2})
  - Rank: 41st
  - Median household income: $70,300 (2023)
  - Income rank: 36th (2021)
- Demonym: Kansan

Language
  - Official language: English

Time zones
- Majority of state: UTC−06:00 (CST)
  - Summer (DST): UTC−05:00 (CDT)
- Greeley, Hamilton, Sherman, and Wallace counties: UTC−07:00 (MST)
  - Summer (DST): UTC−06:00 (MDT)
- USPS abbreviation: KS
- ISO 3166 code: US-KS
- Traditional abbreviation: Kan., Kans.
- Latitude: 37° N to 40° N
- Longitude: 94° 35′ W to 102° 3′ W
- Website: portal.kansas.gov

Kansas (/ˈkænzəs/ KAN-zəss) is a landlocked state in the Midwestern region and the centermost state of mainland United States. Part of the Great Plains, it borders Nebraska to the north, Colorado to the west, Oklahoma to the south, and Missouri to the east. Kansas is named after the Kansas River, in turn named after the Kansa people. Its capital is Topeka, and its most populous city is Wichita; however, the largest urban area is the bi-state Kansas City metropolitan area surrounding Kansas City, Missouri, which straddles the border of Kansas and Missouri.

For thousands of years, what is now known as Kansas was home to numerous and diverse Indigenous tribes. The first settlement of non-Indigenous people in Kansas occurred in 1827 at Fort Leavenworth. The pace of settlement accelerated in the 1850s, in the midst of political wars over the slavery debate. When it was officially opened to settlement by the U.S. government in 1854 with the Kansas–Nebraska Act, conflict between abolitionist Free-Staters from New England and pro-slavery settlers from neighboring Missouri broke out over the question of whether Kansas would become a free state or a slave state, in a period known as Bleeding Kansas. On January 29, 1861, Kansas entered the Union as a free state, hence the unofficial nickname "The Free State". Passage of the Homestead Acts in 1862 brought a further influx of settlers, and the booming cattle trade of the 1870s attracted some of the Wild West's most iconic figures to western Kansas.

As of 2015, Kansas was among the most productive agricultural states, producing high yields of wheat, corn, sorghum, and soybeans. In addition to its traditional strength in agriculture, Kansas possesses an extensive aerospace industry. Kansas, which has an area of 82,278 square miles (213,100 square kilometers) is the 15th-largest state by area, the 36th most-populous of the 50 states, with a population of 2,940,865 according to the 2020 census, and the 10th least densely populated. Residents of Kansas are called Kansans or Jayhawkers. Mount Sunflower is Kansas's highest point at 4,039 feet (1,231 meters).

Kansas is generally considered to be the geographic center of the contiguous United States, with Lebanon being approximately the center.

== Etymology ==
The name Kansas derives from the Algonquian term Akansa, referring to the Quapaw people. These were a Dhegiha Siouan-speaking people who settled in Arkansas around the 13th century. The stem -kansa is named after the Kaw people, also known as the Kansa, a federally recognized Native American tribe. The tribe's name (natively kką:ze) is often said to mean "people of the (south) wind", although this was probably not the term's original meaning.

== History ==
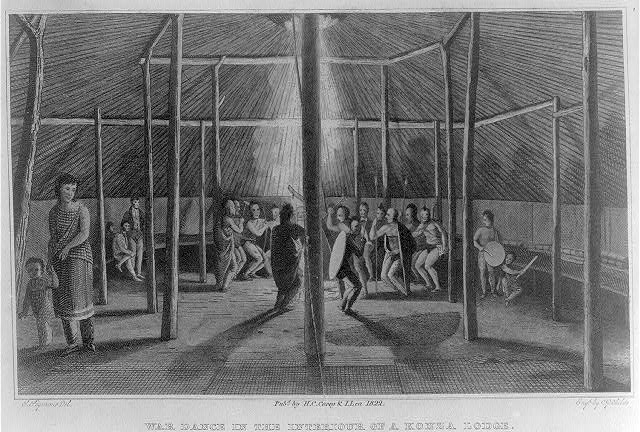
Samuel Seymour's 1819 illustration of a Kansa lodge and dance is the oldest drawing known to have been done in Kansas.

Before European colonization, Kansas was occupied by the Caddoan Wichita and later the Siouan Kaw people. The Indigenous people in the eastern part of the state generally lived in villages along the river valleys. Those in the western part of the state were semi-nomadic and hunted large herds of bison. The first European to set foot in present-day Kansas was the Spanish conquistador Francisco Vázquez de Coronado, who explored the area in 1541.

Between 1763 and 1803, the territory of Kansas was integrated into Spanish Louisiana. During that period, Governor Luis de Unzaga 'le Conciliateur' promoted expeditions and good relations with the Amerindians. Explorer Antoine de Marigny and others continued trading across the Kansas River, especially at its confluence with the Missouri River, tributaries of the Mississippi River.

In 1803, most of modern Kansas was acquired by the United States as part of the Louisiana Purchase. Southwest Kansas, however, was still a part of Spain, Mexico, and the Republic of Texas until the conclusion of the Mexican–American War in 1848, when these lands were ceded to the United States. From 1812 to 1821, Kansas was part of the Missouri Territory. The Santa Fe Trail traversed Kansas from 1821 to 1880, transporting manufactured goods from Missouri and silver and furs from Santa Fe, New Mexico. Wagon ruts from the trail are still visible in the prairie today.

In 1827, Fort Leavenworth became the first permanent settlement of white Americans in the future state. The Kansas–Nebraska Act became law on May 30, 1854, establishing Nebraska Territory and Kansas Territory, and opening the area to broader settlement by whites. Kansas Territory stretched all the way to the Continental Divide and included the sites of present-day Denver, Colorado Springs, and Pueblo.

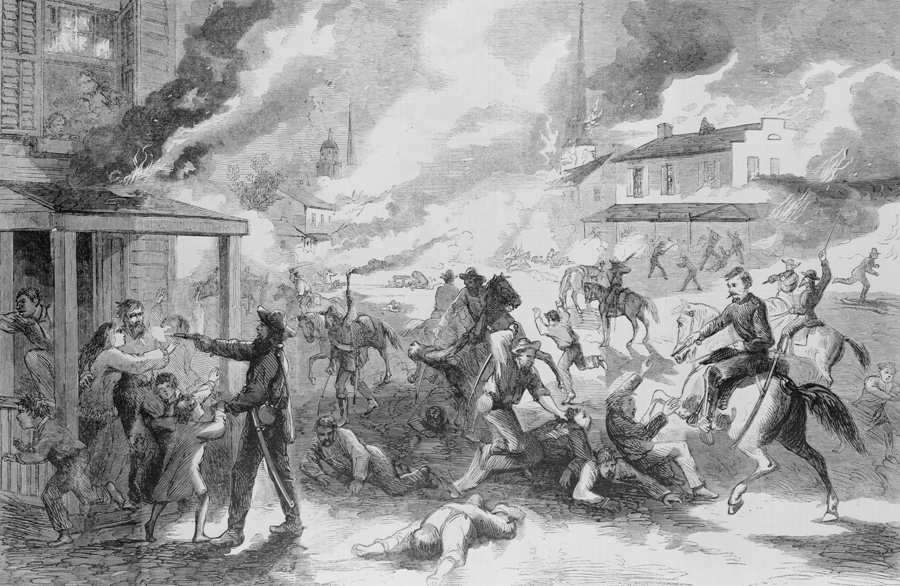
Quantrill's Raid on Lawrence

=== Bleeding Kansas and the Civil War ===
The first non-military settlement of Euro-Americans in Kansas Territory consisted of abolitionists from Massachusetts and other Free-Staters who founded the town of Lawrence and attempted to stop the spread of slavery from neighboring Missouri.

Missouri and Arkansas continually sent settlers into Kansas Territory along its eastern border to sway votes in favor of slavery prior to Kansas statehood elections. Directly presaging the American Civil War these forces collided, entering into skirmishes and guerrilla conflicts that earned the territory the nickname Bleeding Kansas. These included John Brown's Pottawatomie massacre of 1856.

Kansas was admitted to the Union as a free state on January 29, 1861, making it the 34th state to join the United States. By that time, the violence in Kansas had largely subsided, but during the Civil War, on August 21, 1863, William Quantrill led several hundred of his supporters on a raid into Lawrence, destroying much of the city and killing nearly 200 people. He was roundly condemned by both the conventional Confederate military and the partisan rangers commissioned by the Missouri legislature. His application to that body for a commission was flatly rejected due to his pre-war criminal record.

=== Settlement and the Wild West ===
Passage of the Homestead Acts in 1862 accelerated settlement and agricultural development in the state. After the Civil War, many veterans constructed homesteads in Kansas. Many African Americans also looked to Kansas as the land of "John Brown" and, led by freedmen like Benjamin "Pap" Singleton, began establishing black colonies in the state. Leaving southern states in the late 1870s because of increasing discrimination, they became known as Exodusters.

At the same time, the Chisholm Trail was opened and the Wild West era commenced in Kansas. Storied lawman Wild Bill Hickok was a deputy marshal at Fort Riley and a marshal at Hays and Abilene. Dodge City was home to both Bat Masterson and Wyatt Earp, who worked as lawmen in the town. The Dalton Gang robbed trains and banks throughout Kansas and the Southwest and maintained a hideout in Meade. During its 19th-century peak, Dodge City shipped up to 500,000 Texas cattle annually, cementing its reputation as the "Queen of the Cowtowns".

=== 20th century ===
In response to demands of Methodists and other evangelical Protestants, in 1881 Kansas became the first U.S. state to adopt a constitutional amendment prohibiting all alcoholic beverages, which was repealed in 1948. Anti-saloon activist Carrie Nation vandalized her first saloon in Kiowa in 1900. In 1922, suffragist Ella Uphay Mowry became the first female gubernatorial candidate in the state when she ran as "Mrs. W.D. Mowry". She later stated: "Someone had to be the pioneer. I firmly believe that some day a woman will sit in the governor's chair in Kansas."

Kansas suffered severe environmental damage in the 1930s due to the combined effects of the Great Depression and the Dust Bowl, and large numbers of people left southwestern Kansas in particular for better opportunities elsewhere. The outbreak of World War II spurred rapid growth in aircraft manufacturing near Wichita in the so-called Battle of Kansas, and the aerospace sector remains a significant portion of the Kansan economy to this day.

== Geography ==
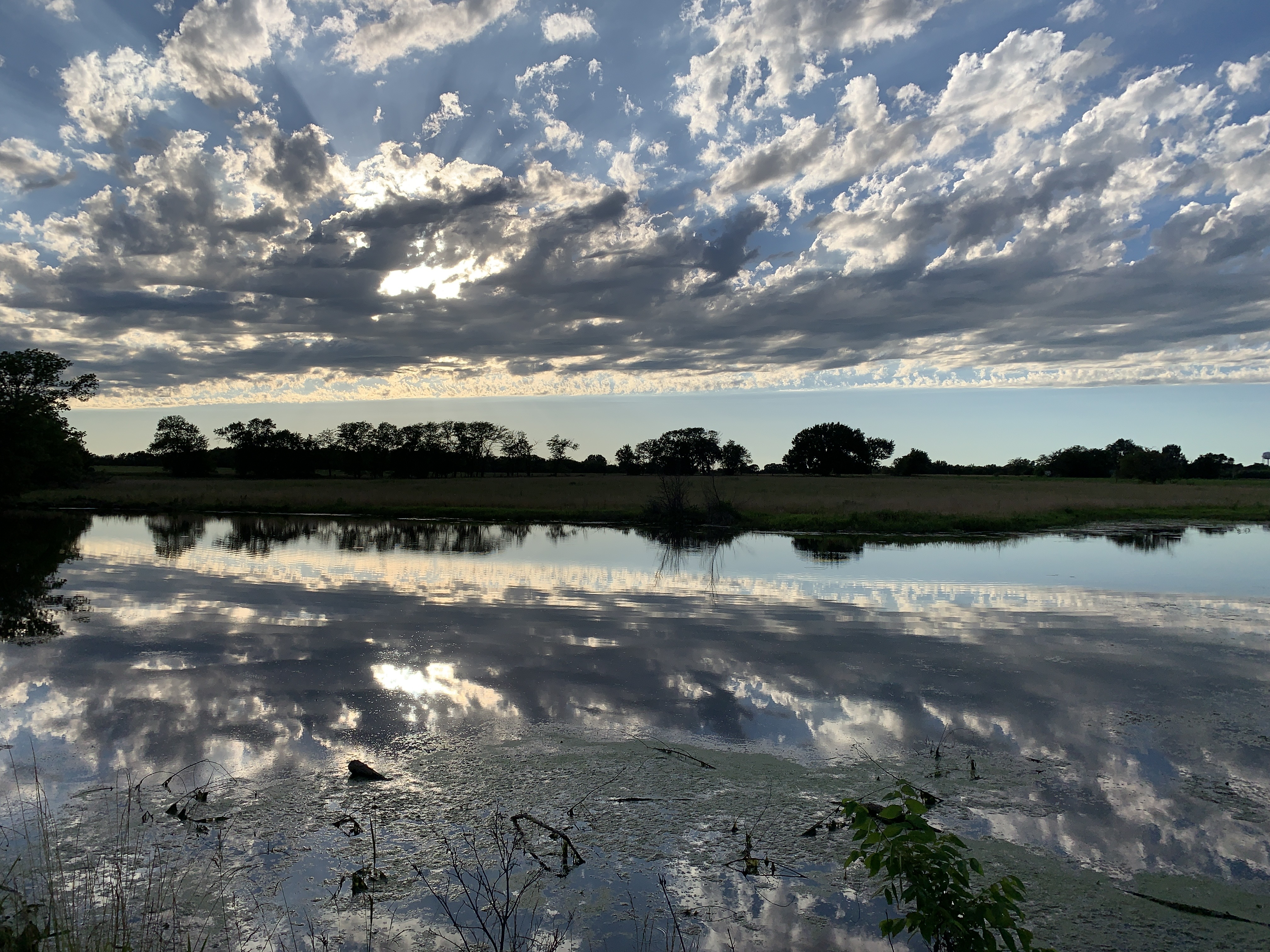
Pond in Osage County, Kansas

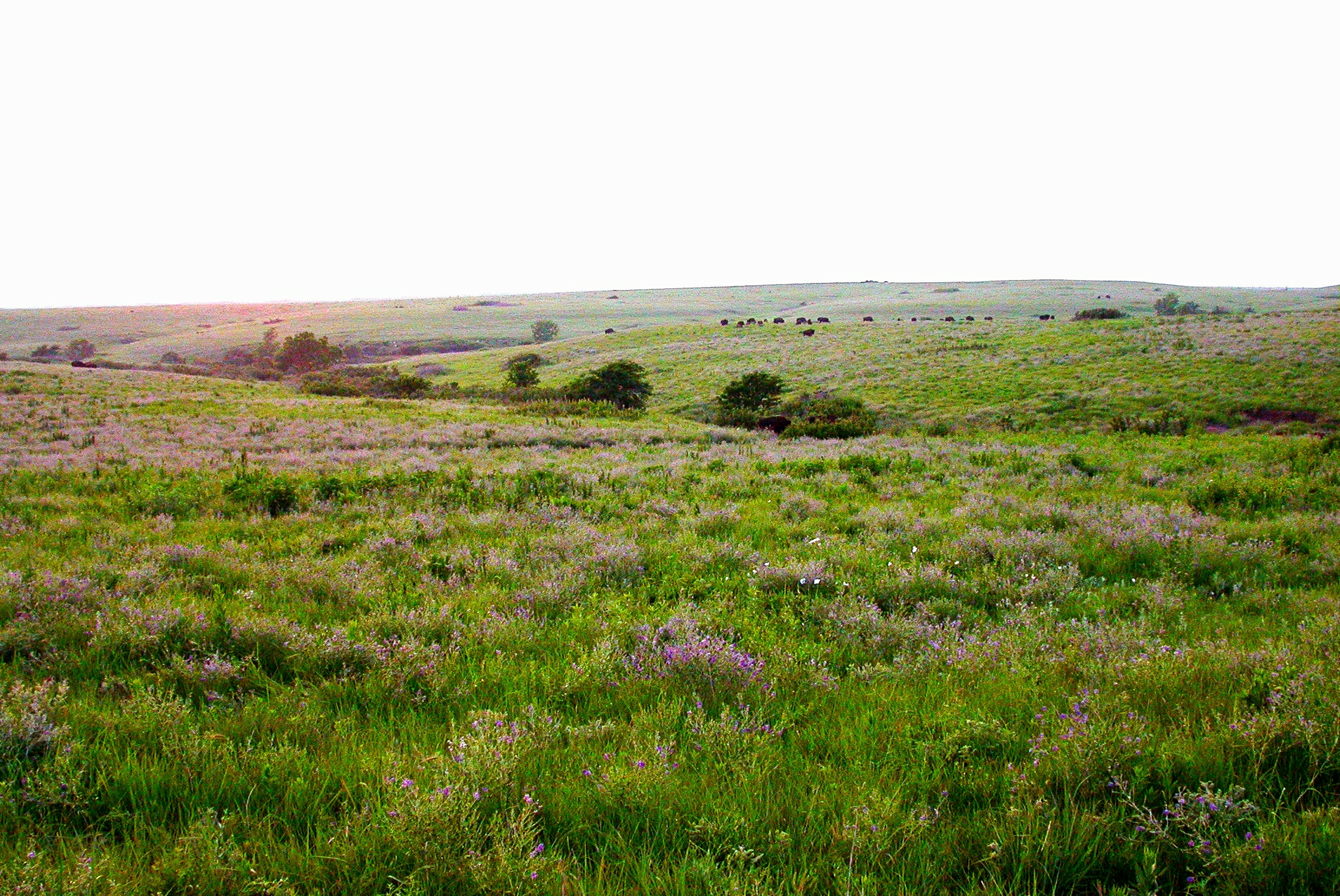
The Great Plains of Kansas

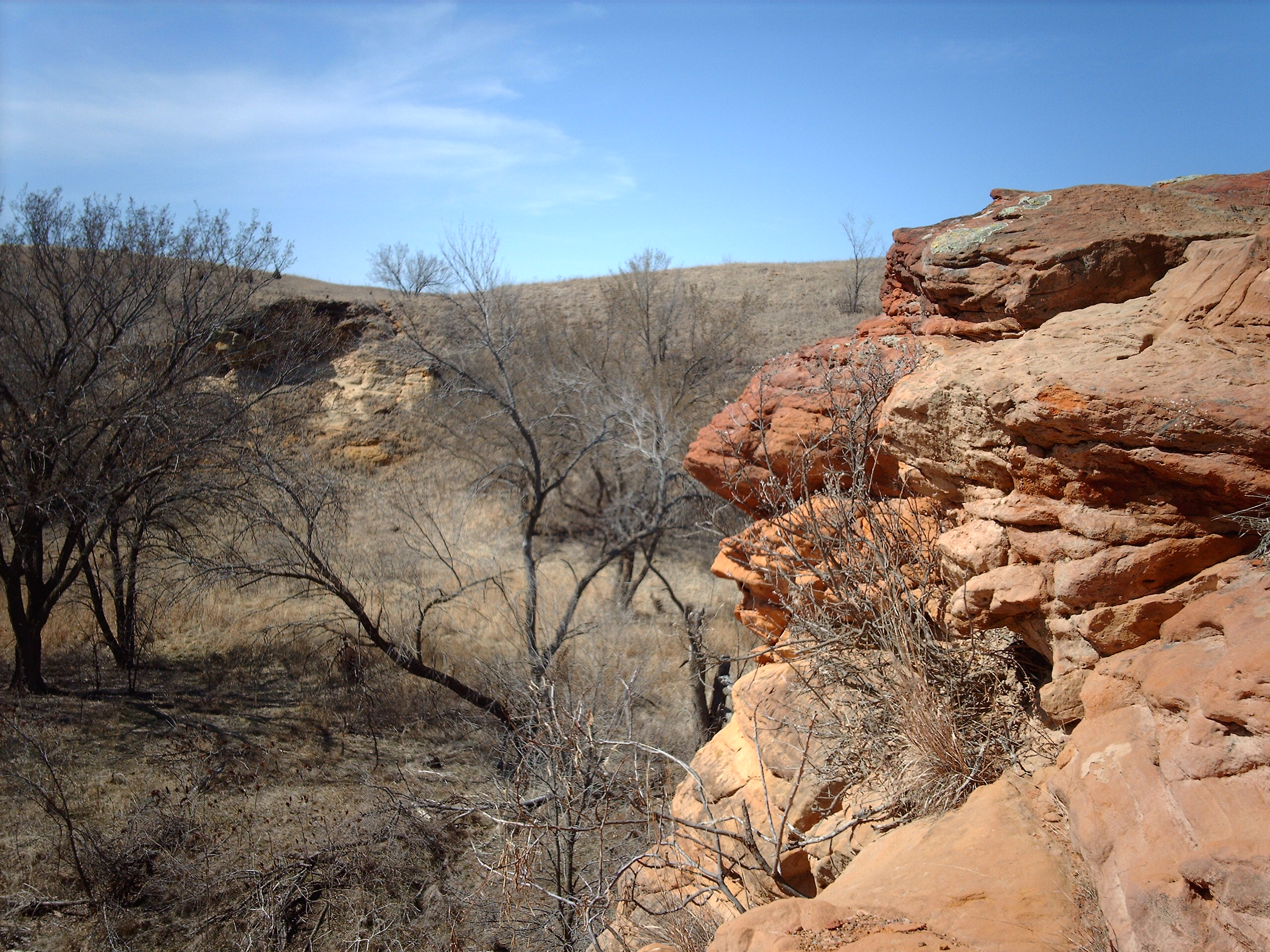
Kanopolis State Park

Kansas is bordered by Nebraska to the north; Missouri to the east; Oklahoma to the south; and Colorado to the west. The state is divided into 105 counties with 628 cities, with its largest county by area being Butler County. Kansas is located equidistant from the Pacific and Atlantic oceans. The geographic center of the 48 contiguous states is in Smith County near Lebanon. Until 1989, the Meades Ranch Triangulation Station in Osborne County was the geodetic center of North America: the central reference point for all maps of North America. The geographic center of Kansas is in Barton County.

=== Geology ===
Kansas is underlain by a sequence of horizontal to gently westward dipping sedimentary rocks. A sequence of Mississippian, Pennsylvanian and Permian rocks outcrop in the eastern and southern part of the state. The state's western half has exposures of Cretaceous through Tertiary sediments, the latter derived from the erosion of the uplifted Rocky Mountains to the west. These are underlain by older Paleozoic and Mesozoic sediments which correlate well with the outcrops to the east. The state's northeastern corner was subjected to glaciation in the Pleistocene and is covered by glacial drift and loess.

=== Topography ===
The western third of the state, lying in the great central plain of the United States, has a generally flat or undulating surface, while the eastern third has many hills and forests; the middle third is generally hilly, with more sparse vegetation than the eastern third. The land gradually rises from east to west. Its altitude ranges from 684 ft (208 m) along the Verdigris River at Coffeyville in Montgomery County, to 4,039 ft (1,231 m) at Mount Sunflower, 0.5 miles (0.80 kilometers) from the Colorado border, in Wallace County. It is a common misconception that Kansas is the flattest state in the nation—in 2003, a tongue-in-cheek study famously declared the state "flatter than a pancake". Kansas has a maximum topographic relief of 3,360 ft (1,020 m), making it the 23rd flattest U.S. state measured by maximum relief.

=== Rivers ===
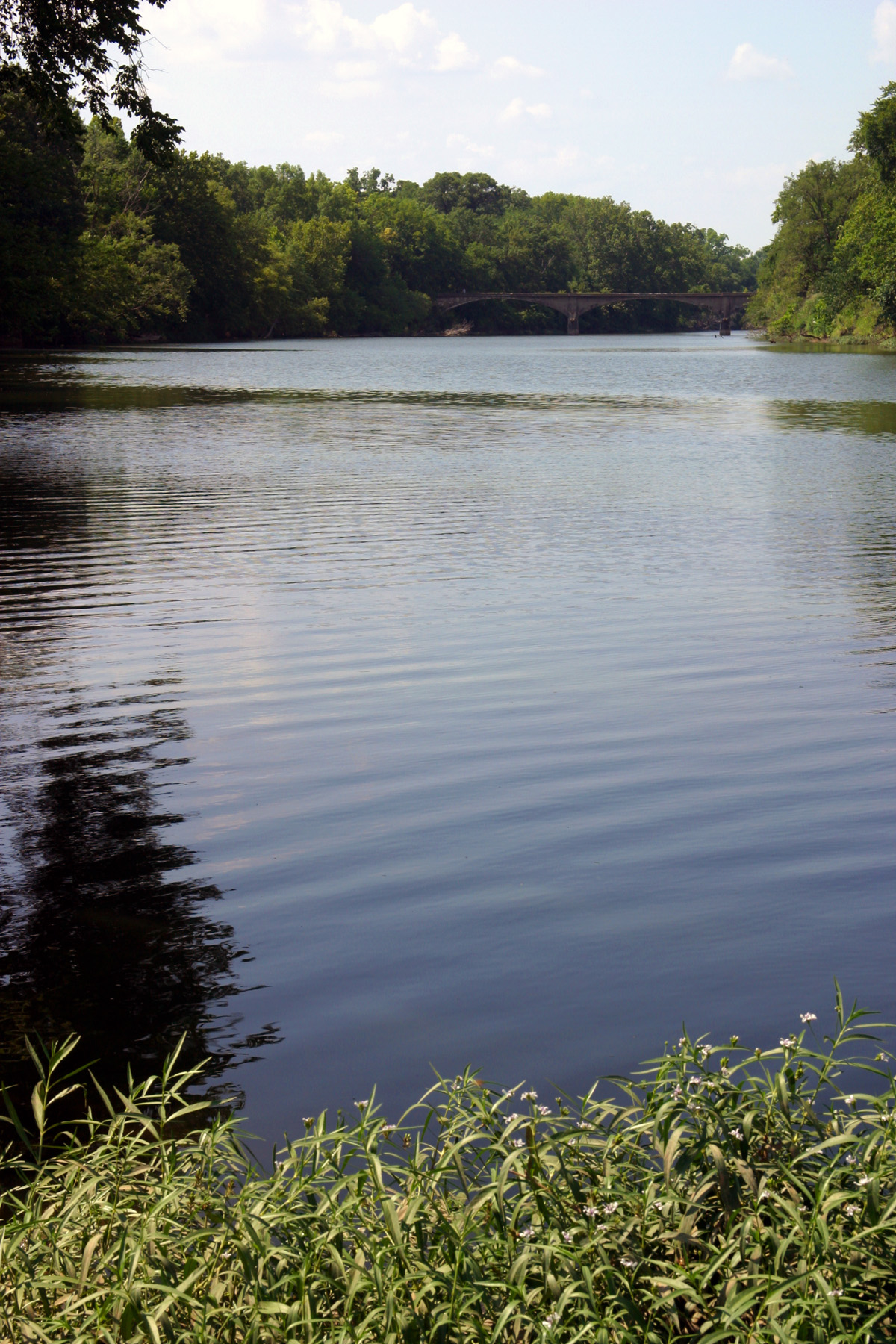
Spring River, Kansas

Around 74 mi (119 km) of the state's northeastern boundary is defined by the Missouri River. The Kansas River (locally known as the Kaw), formed by the junction of the Smoky Hill and Republican rivers at appropriately named Junction City, joins the Missouri River at Kansas City, after a course of 170 mi (270 km) across the northeastern part of the state.

The Arkansas River (pronunciation varies), rising in Colorado, flows with a bending course for nearly 500 mi (800 km) across the western and southern parts of the state. With its tributaries, (the Little Arkansas, Ninnescah, Walnut, Cow Creek, Cimarron, Verdigris, and the Neosho), it forms the southern drainage system of the state.

Kansas's other rivers are the Saline and Solomon Rivers, tributaries of the Smoky Hill River; the Big Blue, Delaware, and Wakarusa, which flow into the Kansas River; and the Marais des Cygnes, a tributary of the Missouri River. Spring River is located between Riverton and Baxter Springs.

=== National parks and historic sites ===
Areas under the protection of the National Park Service include:

- Brown v. Board of Education National Historic Site in Topeka
- Fort Larned National Historic Site in Larned
- Fort Scott National Historic Site in Bourbon County
- Nicodemus National Historic Site at Nicodemus
- Pony Express National Historic Trail
- Tallgrass Prairie National Preserve near Strong City

=== Flora and fauna ===
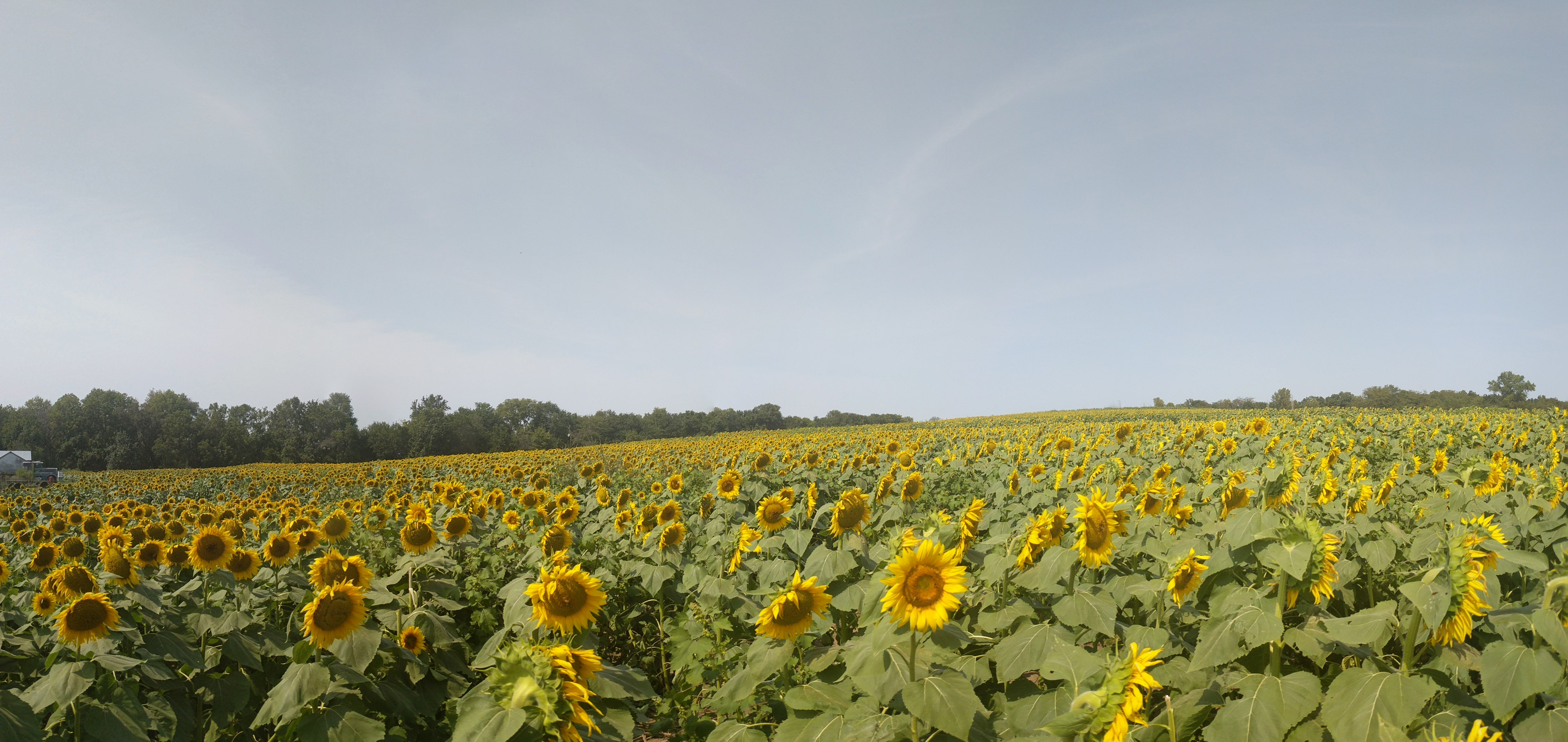
Sunflower field outside of Lawrence

In Kansas, there are currently 238 species of rare animals and 400 rare plants. Among those include: Smooth rockress, Virginia rail, Western Grotto Salamander, Royal Fern, Turkey-tangle, Bobolink, Cave salamander, Mead's Milkweed, Western Prairie Fringed Orchid, Gray bat, Snowy Plover, Strecker's Chorus Frog, Peregrine falcon, Arkansas River Shiner, Whooping Crane, and Black-footed ferret. Common animal species and grasses include: crows, deer, lesser prairie-chicken, mice, moles, Virginia opossum, prairie dogs, raccoon, Eastern Gama Grass, Prairie Dropseed, Indian Grass, little bluestem, Switch grass, Northern Sea Oats, Tussock Sedge, Sideoats grama, and Big Bluestem.

=== Climate ===
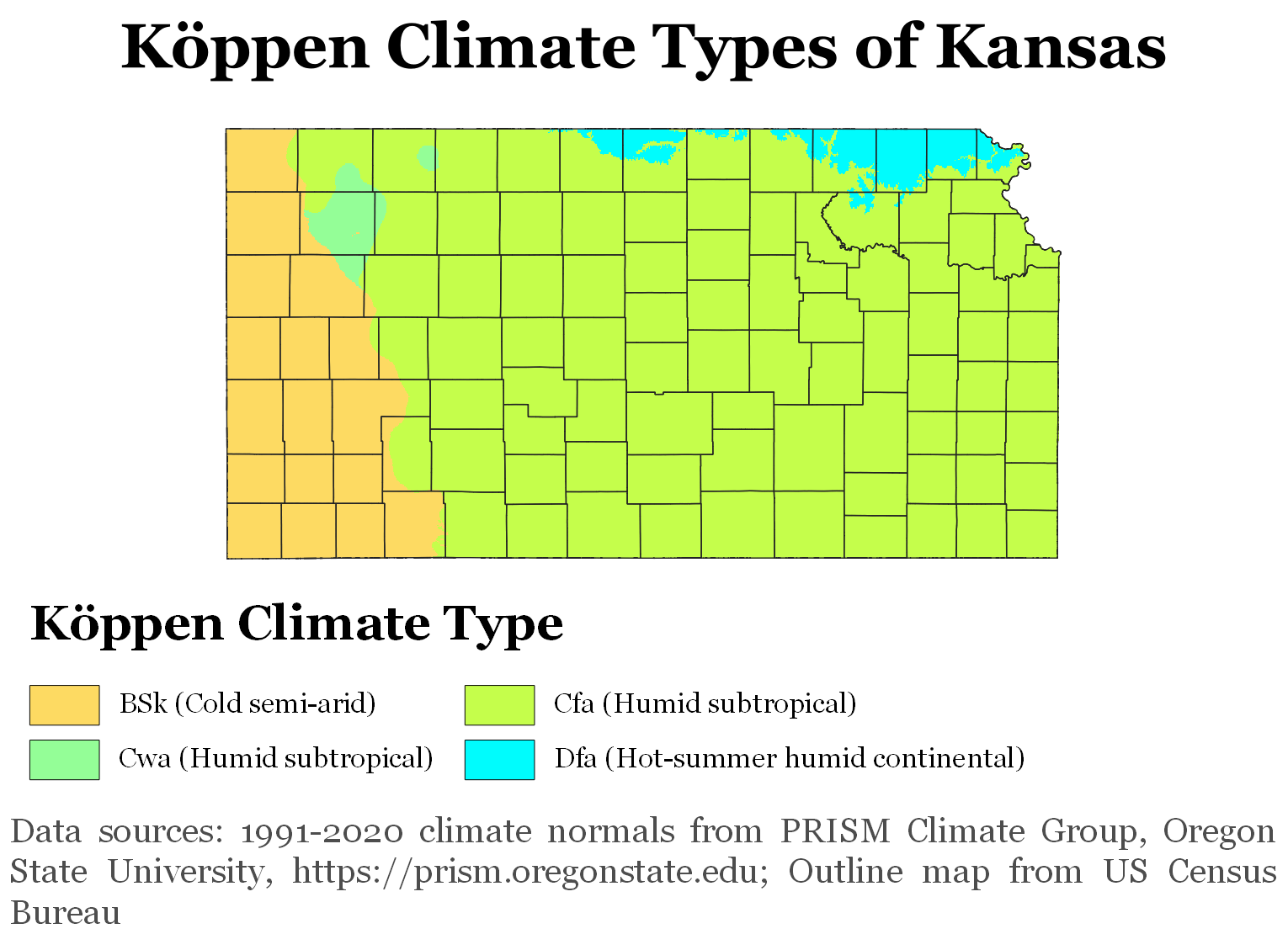
Köppen climate types of Kansas, using 1991–2020 climate normals

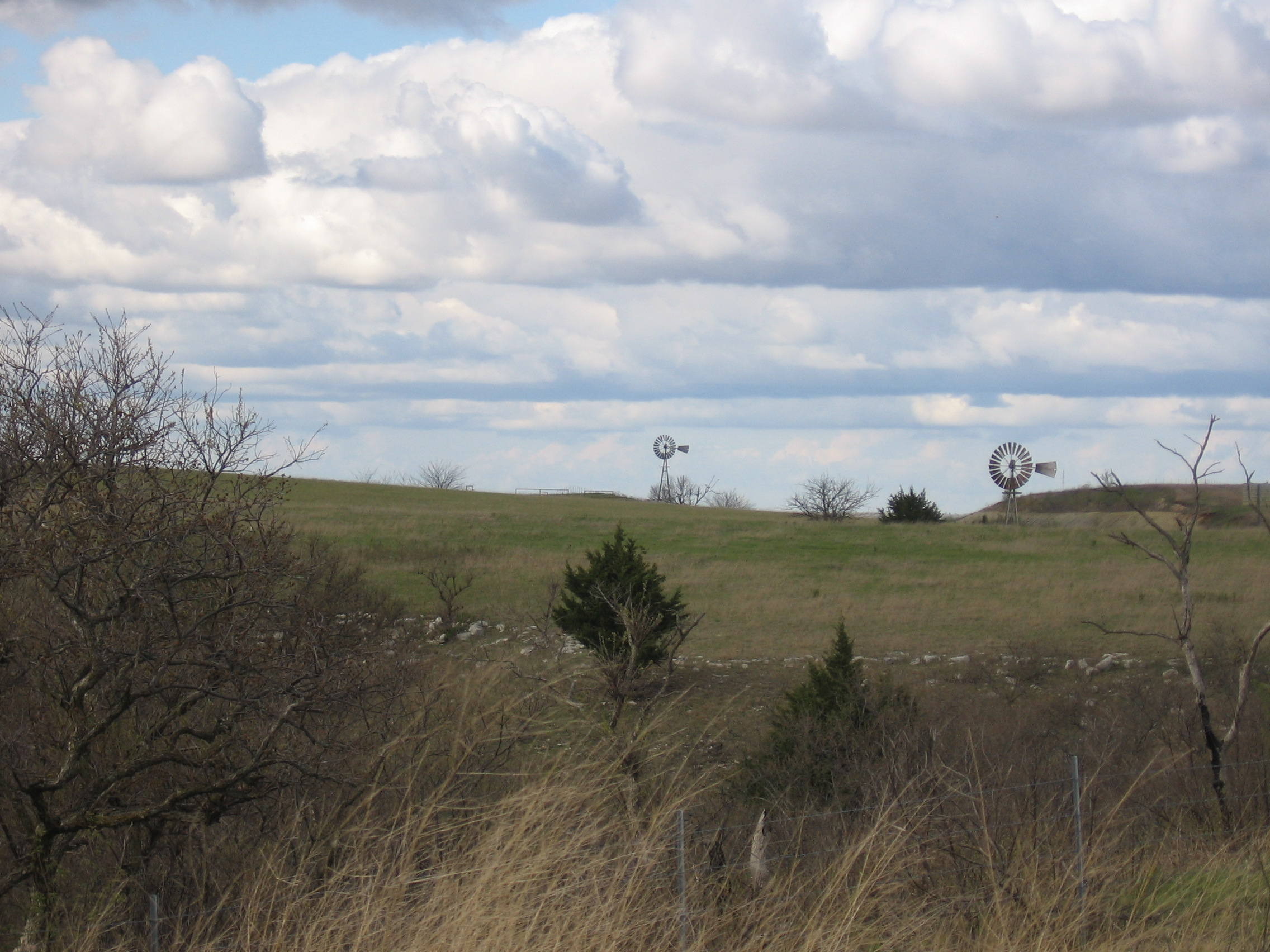
Clouds in northeastern Kansas

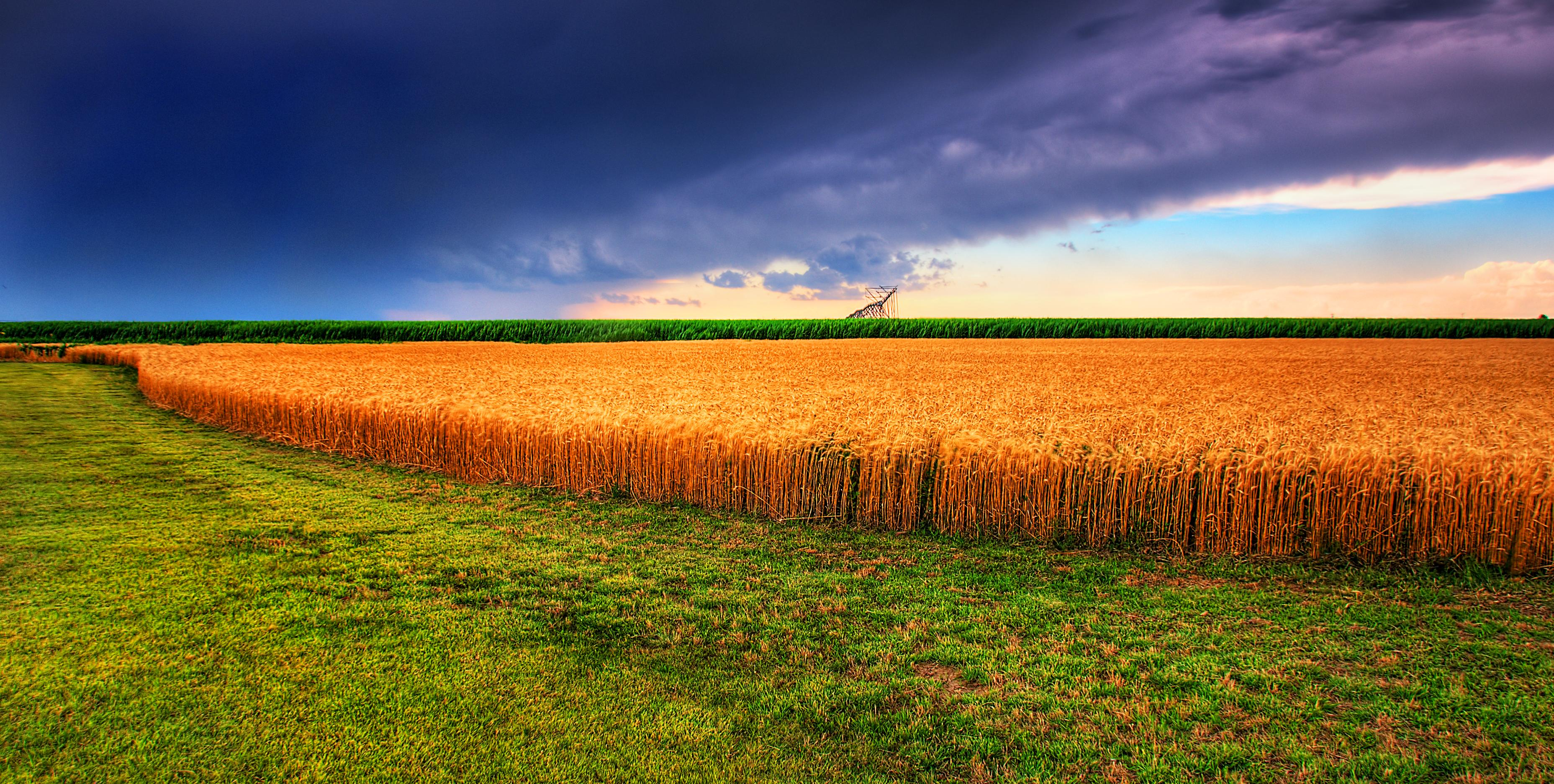
Kansas summer wheat and storm panorama

In the Köppen climate classification, Kansas has three climates: humid continental, semi-arid steppe, and humid subtropical. The eastern two-thirds of the state (especially the northeastern portion) has a humid continental climate, with cool to cold winters and hot, often humid summers. Most of the precipitation falls during both the summer and the spring. The USDA hardiness zones for Kansas range from Zone 5b (−15 °F to −10 °F) in the North to Zone 7a (0 °F to 5 °F) in the South.

The western third of the state—from roughly the U.S. Route 83 corridor westward—has a semi-arid steppe climate. Summers are hot, often very hot, and generally less humid. Winters are highly changeable between warm and very cold. The western region receives an average of about 16 inches (410 millimeters) of precipitation per year. Chinook winds in the winter can warm western Kansas all the way into the 80 degrees Fahrenheit (27 degrees Celsius) range.

The south-central and southeastern portions of the state, including the Wichita area, have a humid subtropical climate with hot and humid summers, milder winters, and more precipitation than elsewhere in Kansas. Some features of all three climates can be found in most of the state, with droughts and changeable weather between dry and humid not uncommon, and both warm and cold spells in the winter.

Temperatures in areas between U.S. Routes 83 and 81, as well as the southwestern portion of the state along and south of U.S. 50, reach 90 °F (32 °C) or above on most days of June, July, and August. High humidity added to the high temperatures sends the heat index into life-threatening territory, especially in Wichita, Hutchinson, Salina, Russell, Hays, and Great Bend. Temperatures are often higher in Dodge City, Garden City, and Liberal, but the heat index in those three cities is usually lower than the actual air temperature.

Although temperatures of 100 °F (38 °C) or higher are not as common in areas east of U.S. 81, higher humidity and the urban heat island effect lead most summer days to heat indices between 107 and 114 °F (42 and 46 °C) in Topeka, Lawrence, and the Kansas City metropolitan area. Also, combined with humidity between 85 and 95 percent, dangerous heat indices can be experienced at every hour of the day.

Precipitation ranges from about 47 inches (1,200 mm) annually in the state's southeast corner to about 16 inches (410 mm) in the southwest. Snowfall ranges from around 5 inches (130 mm) in the fringes of the south, to 35 inches (890 mm) in the far northwest. Frost-free days range from more than 200 days in the south, to 130 days in the northwest. Thus, Kansas is the country's ninth or tenth sunniest state, depending on the source. Western Kansas is as sunny as parts of California and Arizona.

Kansas is prone to severe weather, especially in the spring and the early-summer. Despite the frequent sunshine throughout much of the state, due to its location at a climatic boundary prone to intrusions of multiple air masses, the state is vulnerable to strong and severe thunderstorms. Some of these storms become supercell thunderstorms; these can produce some tornadoes, occasionally those of EF3 strength or higher. Kansas averages more than 50 tornadoes annually. Severe thunderstorms sometimes drop some very large hail over Kansas as well. Furthermore, these storms can even bring in flash flooding and damaging straight line winds.

According to NOAA, the all-time highest temperature recorded in Kansas is (121 °F or 49.4 °C) on July 24, 1936, near Alton in Osborne County, and the all-time low is −40 °F (−40 °C) on February 13, 1905, near Lebanon in Smith County. Alton and Lebanon are approximately 50 miles (80 km) apart.

Kansas's record high of 121 °F (49.4 °C) ties with North Dakota for the fifth-highest record high in an American state, behind California (134 °F or 56.7 °C), Arizona (128 °F or 53.3 °C), Nevada (125 °F or 51.7 °C), and New Mexico (122 °F or 50 °C).

Climate data for Kansas
Month	Jan	Feb	Mar	Apr	May	Jun	Jul	Aug	Sep	Oct	Nov	Dec	Year
Record high °F (°C)	88 (31)	92 (33)	104 (40)	107 (42)	108 (42)	118 (48)	121 (49)	119 (48)	117 (47)	104 (40)	96 (36)	92 (33)	121 (49)
Mean daily maximum °F (°C)	42.6 (5.9)	47.2 (8.4)	57.7 (14.3)	67.1 (19.5)	76.4 (24.7)	86.7 (30.4)	91.5 (33.1)	89.5 (31.9)	81.9 (27.7)	69.4 (20.8)	55.7 (13.2)	44.5 (6.9)	67.5 (19.7)
Mean daily minimum °F (°C)	19.5 (−6.9)	22.7 (−5.2)	32.0 (0.0)	40.7 (4.8)	51.4 (10.8)	61.7 (16.5)	66.5 (19.2)	64.7 (18.2)	55.8 (13.2)	43.1 (6.2)	30.8 (−0.7)	22.0 (−5.6)	42.6 (5.9)
Record low °F (°C)	−35 (−37)	−40 (−40)	−25 (−32)	−2 (−19)	14 (−10)	30 (−1)	32 (0)	33 (1)	15 (−9)	−3 (−19)	−20 (−29)	−34 (−37)	−40 (−40)
Average precipitation inches (mm)	0.7 (18)	1.0 (25)	1.8 (46)	2.7 (69)	4.2 (110)	4.0 (100)	3.9 (99)	3.5 (89)	2.5 (64)	2.3 (58)	1.3 (33)	1.1 (28)	29.0 (740)
Source 1: https://www.extremeweatherwatch.com/states/kansas
Source 2: https://www.factmonster.com/math-science/weather/kansas-temperature-extremes

Monthly normal high and low temperatures for various Kansas cities (°F)
City	Jan	Feb	Mar	Apr	May	Jun	Jul	Aug	Sep	Oct	Nov	Dec
Concordia	36/17	43/22	54/31	64/41	74/52	85/62	91/67	88/66	80/56	68/44	51/30	40/21
Dodge City	41/19	48/24	57/31	67/41	76/52	87/62	93/67	91/66	82/56	70/44	55/30	44/22
Goodland	39/16	45/20	53/26	63/35	72/46	84/56	89/61	87/60	78/50	66/38	50/25	41/18
Topeka	37/17	44/23	55/33	66/43	75/53	84/63	89/68	88/65	80/56	69/44	53/32	41/22
Wichita	40/20	47/25	57/34	67/44	76/54	87/64	93/69	92/68	82/59	70/47	55/34	43/24

== Settlement ==
Urban and rural populations

Known as rural flight, the last few decades have been marked by a migratory pattern out of the countryside into cities. Out of all the cities in these Midwestern states, 89% have fewer than 3,000 people, and hundreds of those have fewer than 1,000. In Kansas alone, there are more than 6,000 ghost towns and dwindling communities, according to one Kansas historian, Daniel C. Fitzgerald. At the same time, some of the communities in Johnson County (metropolitan Kansas City) are among the fastest-growing in the country.

Cities with population of at least 15,000
	City	Population*	Growth rate**	Metro area
1	Wichita	397,532	3.97%	Wichita
2	Overland Park	197,238	13.77%	Kansas City, MO-KS
3	Kansas City	156,607	7.42%	Kansas City
4	Olathe	141,290	12.25%	Kansas City
5	Topeka	126,587	−0.70%	Topeka
6	Lawrence	94,934	8.32%	Lawrence
7	Shawnee	67,311	8.20%	Kansas City
8	Lenexa	57,434	19.18%	Kansas City
9	Manhattan	54,100	3.48%	Manhattan
10	Salina	46,889	-1.71%	‡
11	Hutchinson	40,006	−4.93%	‡
12	Leavenworth	37,351	5.96%	Kansas City
13	Leawood	33,902	6.39%	Kansas City
14	Garden City	28,151	5.60%	‡
15	Dodge City	27,788	1.64%	‡
16	Derby	25,625	15.65%	Wichita
17	Emporia	24,139	-3.12%	‡
18	Gardner	23,287	21.77%	Kansas City
19	Prairie Village	22,957	7.04%	Kansas City
20	Junction City	22,932	-1.80%	Manhattan
21	Hays	21,116	2.95%	‡
22	Pittsburg	20,646	2.04%	‡
23	Liberal	19,825	−3.41%	‡
24	Newton	18,602	−2.77%	Wichita
*2020 census **Growth rate 2010–2020 ‡Defined as a micropolitan area

Kansas has 627 incorporated cities. By state statute, cities are divided into three classes as determined by the population obtained "by any census of enumeration". A city of the third class has a population of less than 5,000, but cities reaching a population of more than 2,000 may be certified as a city of the second class. The second class is limited to cities with a population of less than 25,000, and upon reaching a population of more than 15,000, they may be certified as a city of the first class. First and second class cities are independent of any township and are not included within the township's territory.

=== Birth data ===
Note: Births in table do not add up, because Hispanics are counted both by their ethnicity and by their race, giving a higher overall number.

Live Births by Single Race/Ethnicity of Mother
Race	2013	2014	2015	2016	2017	2018	2019	2020	2021	2022
White:	34,178 (88.0%)	34,420 (87.7%)	34,251 (87.5%)	...	...	...	...	...	...	...
> Non-Hispanic White	28,281 (72.8%)	28,504 (72.7%)	28,236 (72.1%)	26,935 (70.8%)	25,594 (70.1%)	25,323 (69.8%)	24,549 (69.4%)	23,663 (68.8%)	24,056 (69.3%)	23,669 (68.8%)
Black	2,967 (7.6%)	3,097 (7.9%)	3,090 (7.9%)	2,543 (6.7%)	2,657 (7.3%)	2,575 (7.1%)	2,458 (6.9%)	2,412 (7.0%)	2,316 (6.7%)	2,208 (6.4%)
Asian	1,401 (3.6%)	1,359 (3.5%)	1,483 (3.8%)	1,299 (3.4%)	1,255 (3.4%)	1,228 (3.4%)	1,216 (3.4%)	1,146 (3.3%)	1,031 (3.0%)	1,055 (3.1%)
American Indian	293 (0.7%)	347 (0.9%)	330 (0.8%)	173 (0.5%)	248 (0.7%)	217 (0.6%)	214 (0.6%)	162 (0.5%)	183 (0.5%)	241 (0.7%)
Hispanic (of any race)	6,143 (15.8%)	6,132 (15.6%)	6,300 (16.1%)	6,298 (16.5%)	5,963 (16.3%)	5,977 (16.5%)	6,071 (17.2%)	5,970 (17.4%)	6,122 (17.6%)	6,309 (18.3%)
Total Kansas	38,839 (100%)	39,223 (100%)	39,154 (100%)	38,053 (100%)	36,519 (100%)	36,261 (100%)	35,395 (100%)	34,376 (100%)	34,705 (100%)	34,401 (100%)

- Since 2016, data for births of White Hispanic origin are not collected, but included in one Hispanic group; persons of Hispanic origin may be of any race.

=== Life expectancy ===
The residents of Kansas have a life expectancy near the U.S. national average. In 2013, males in Kansas lived an average of 76.6 years compared to a male national average of 76.7 years and females lived an average of 81.0 years compared to a female national average of 81.5 years. Increases in life expectancy between 1980 and 2013 were below the national average for males and near the national average for females. Male life expectancy in Kansas between 1980 and 2014 increased by an average of 5.2 years, compared to a male national average of a 6.7-year increase. Life expectancy for females in Kansas between 1980 and 2014 increased by 4.3 years, compared to a female national average of a 4.0 year increase.

Using 2017–2019 data, the Robert Wood Johnson Foundation calculated that life expectancy for Kansas counties ranged from 75.8 years for Wyandotte County to 81.7 years for Johnson County. Life expectancy for the state as a whole was 78.5 years. Life expectancy for the United States as a whole in 2019 was 78.8 years.

=== Regions ===
==== Northeast Kansas ====
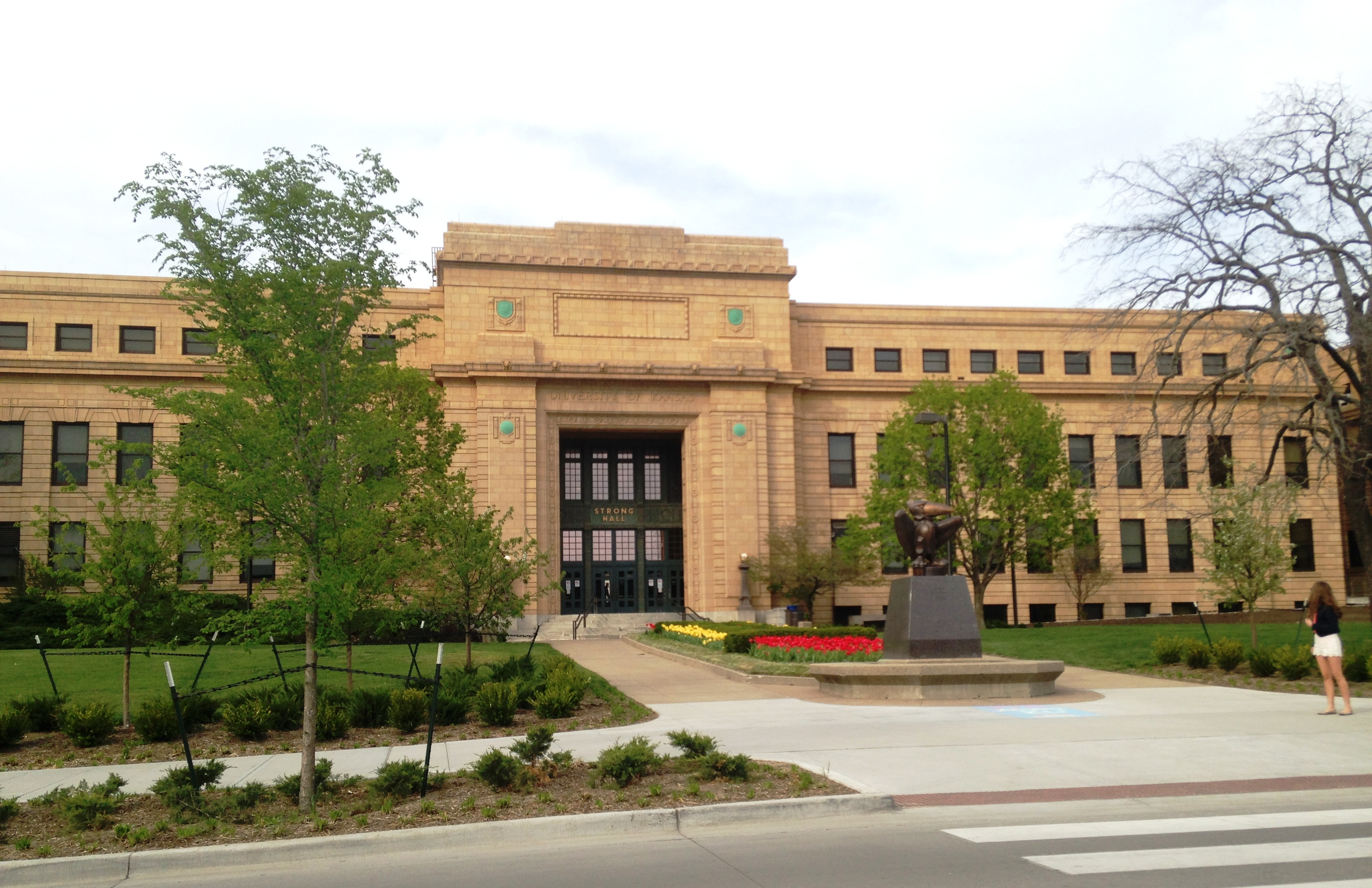
University of Kansas Strong Hall in Lawrence

The northeastern portion of the state, extending from the eastern border to Junction City and from the Nebraska border to south of Johnson County is home to more than 1.5 million people in the Kansas City (Kansas portion), Manhattan, Lawrence, and Topeka metropolitan areas. Overland Park, a young city incorporated in 1960, has the largest population and the largest land area in the county. It is home to Johnson County Community College.

Olathe is the county seat and home to Johnson County Executive Airport. The cities of Olathe, Shawnee, De Soto and Gardner have some of the state's fastest growing populations. The cities of Overland Park, Lenexa, Olathe, De Soto, and Gardner are also notable because they lie along the former route of the Santa Fe Trail. Among cities with at least one thousand residents, Mission Hills has the highest median income in the state.

Several institutions of higher education are located in Northeast Kansas including Baker University (the oldest university in the state, founded in 1858 and affiliated with the United Methodist Church) in Baldwin City, Benedictine College (sponsored by St. Benedict's Abbey and Mount St. Scholastica Monastery and formed from the merger of St. Benedict's College (1858) and Mount St. Scholastica College (1923)) in Atchison, MidAmerica Nazarene University in Olathe, Ottawa University in Ottawa and Overland Park, Kansas City Kansas Community College and KU Medical Center in Kansas City, and KU Edwards Campus in Overland Park. Less than an hour's drive to the west, Lawrence is home to the University of Kansas, the largest public university in the state, and Haskell Indian Nations University.

To the north, Kansas City, with the second-largest land area in the state, contains a number of diverse ethnic neighborhoods. Its attractions include the Kansas Speedway, Sporting Kansas City, Kansas City Monarchs, and The Legends at Village West retail and entertainment center. Nearby, Kansas's first settlement Bonner Springs is home to several national and regional attractions including the Providence Medical Center Amphitheater, the National Agricultural Center and Hall of Fame, and the annual Kansas City Renaissance Festival. Further up the Missouri River, the city of Lansing is the home of the state's first maximum-security prison. Historic Leavenworth, founded in 1854, was the first incorporated city in Kansas. North of the city, Fort Leavenworth is the oldest active Army post west of the Mississippi River. The city of Atchison was an early commercial center in the state and is well known as the birthplace of Amelia Earhart.

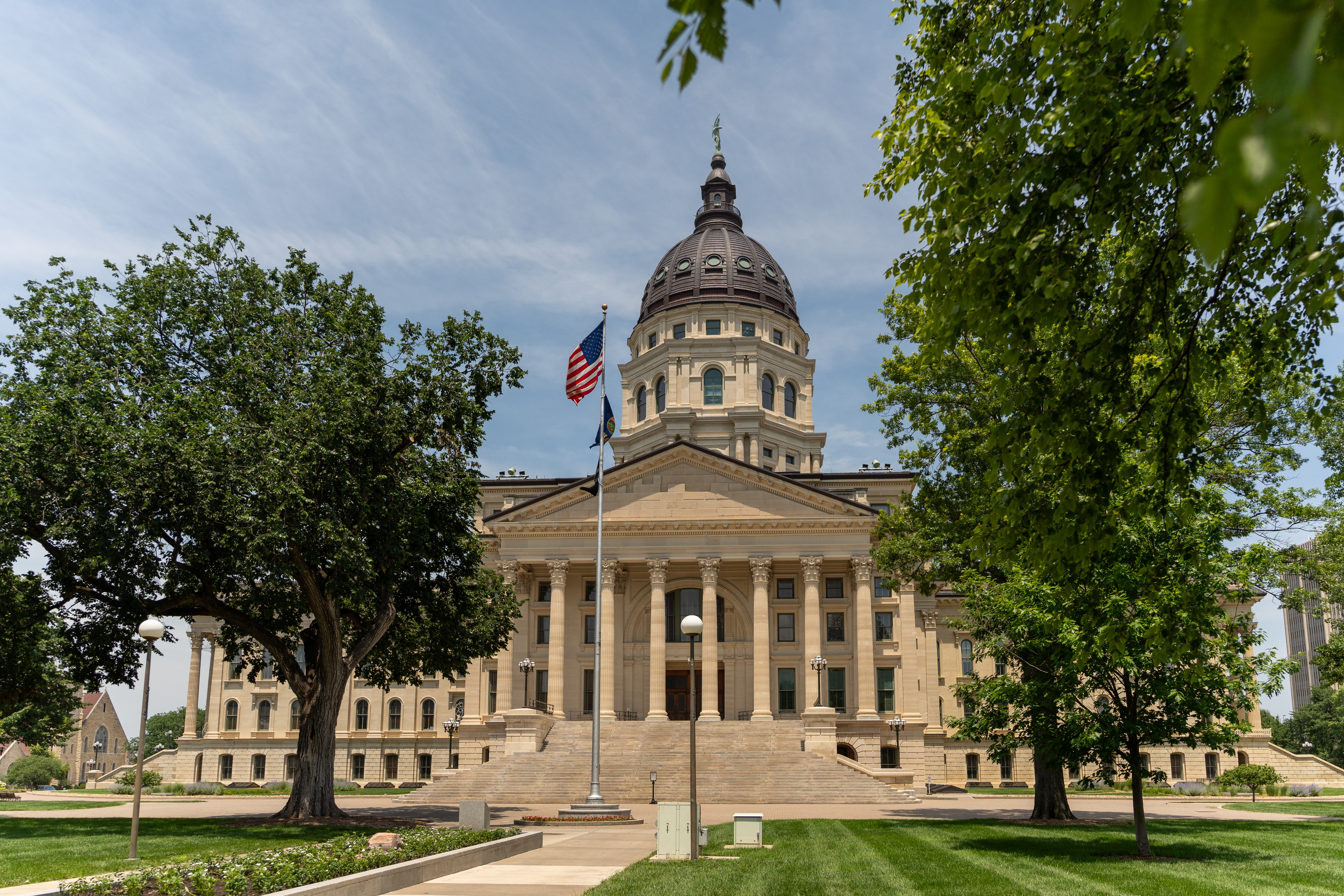
The Kansas Statehouse

To the west, nearly a quarter million people reside in the Topeka metropolitan area. Topeka is the state capital and home to Washburn University and Washburn Institute of Technology. Built at a Kansas River crossing along the old Oregon Trail, this historic city has several nationally registered historic places. Further westward along Interstate 70 and the Kansas River is Junction City with its historic limestone and brick buildings and nearby Fort Riley, well known as the home to the U.S. Army's 1st Infantry Division (nicknamed "the Big Red One"). A short distance away, the city of Manhattan is home to Kansas State University, the second-largest public university in the state and the nation's oldest land-grant university, dating back to 1863. South of the campus, Aggieville dates back to 1889 and is the state's oldest shopping district of its kind.

==== South Central Kansas ====
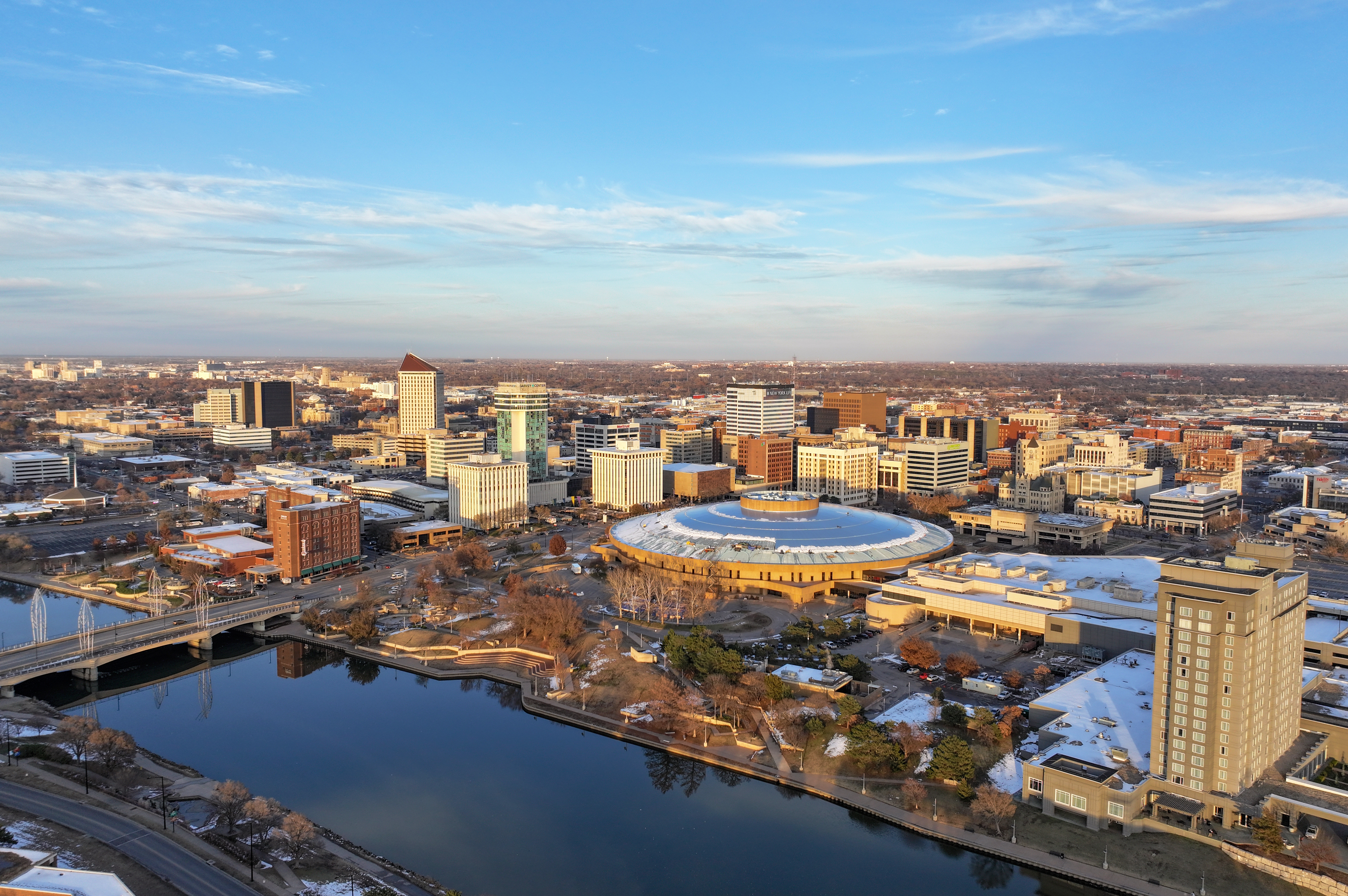
Downtown Wichita in the winter

In south-central Kansas, the Wichita metropolitan area is home to more than 600,000 people. Wichita is the largest city in the state in terms of both land area and population. 'The Air Capital' is a major manufacturing center for the aircraft industry and the home of Wichita State University. Before Wichita was 'The Air Capital' it was a Cowtown. With a number of nationally registered historic places, museums, and other entertainment destinations, it has a desire to become a cultural mecca in the Midwest. Wichita's population growth has grown by double digits and the surrounding suburbs are among the fastest growing cities in the state. The population of Goddard has grown by more than 11% per year since 2000. Other fast-growing cities include Andover, Maize, Park City, Derby, and Haysville.

Wichita was one of the first cities to add the city commissioner and city manager in their form of government. Wichita is also home of the nationally recognized Sedgwick County Zoo.

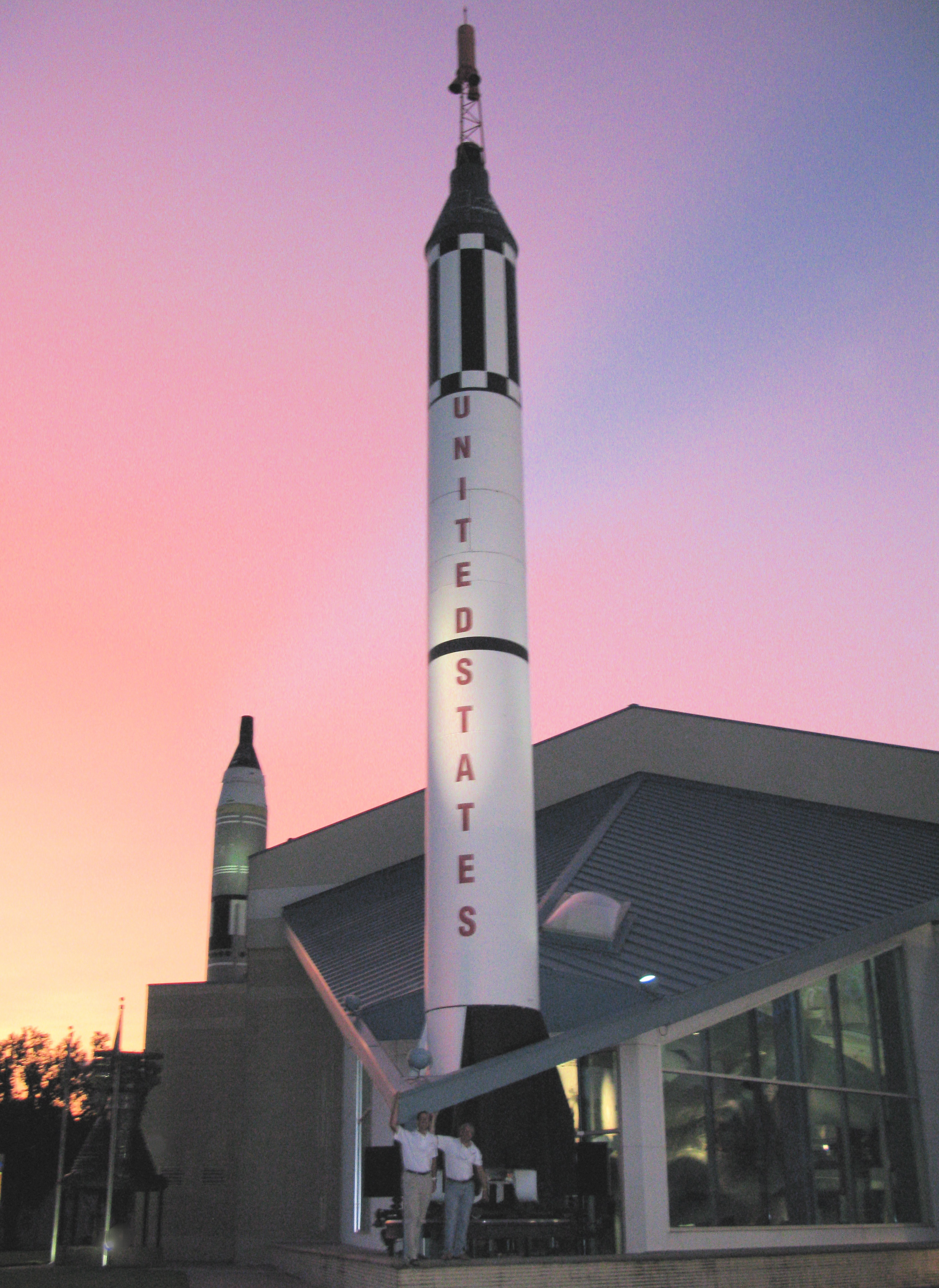
The Cosmosphere, the world-renowned space museum in Hutchinson

Up river (the Arkansas River) from Wichita is the city of Hutchinson. The city was built on one of the world's largest salt deposits (of what would form Strataca), and it has the world's largest and longest wheat elevator. It is also the home of Kansas Cosmosphere and Space Center, Prairie Dunes Country Club and the Kansas State Fair. North of Wichita along Interstate 135 is the city of Newton, the former western terminal of the Santa Fe Railroad and trailhead for the famed Chisholm Trail. To the southeast of Wichita are the cities of Winfield and Arkansas City with historic architecture and the Cherokee Strip Museum (in Ark City). The city of Udall was the site of the deadliest tornado in Kansas on May 25, 1955; it killed 80 people in and near the city.

==== Southeast Kansas ====
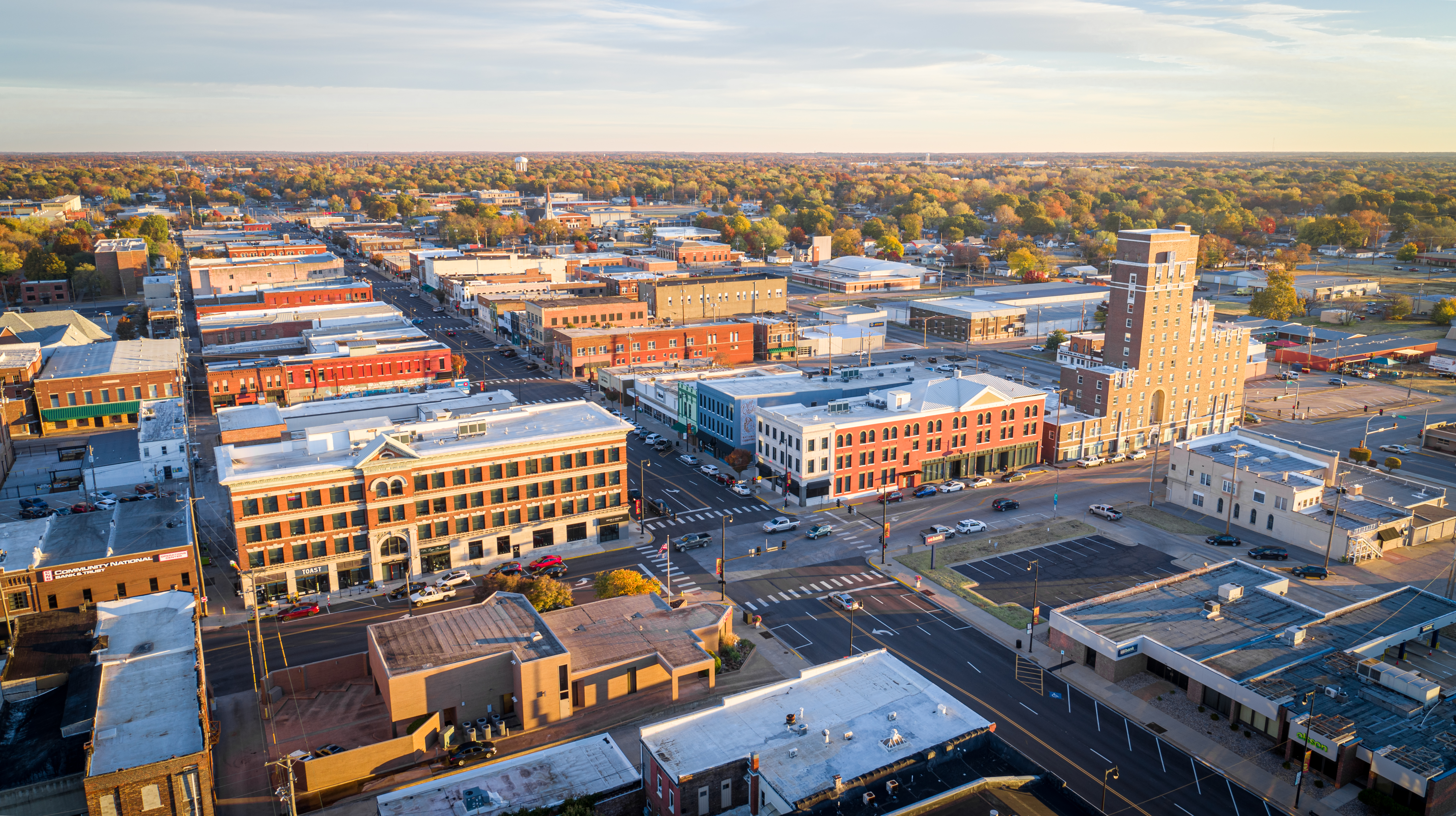
Pittsburg

Southeast Kansas has a unique history with a number of nationally registered historic places in this coal-mining region. Located in Crawford County (dubbed the Fried Chicken Capital of Kansas), Pittsburg is the largest city in the region and the home of Pittsburg State University. The neighboring city of Frontenac in 1888 was the site of the worst mine disaster in the state in which an underground explosion killed 47 miners. "Big Brutus" is located 1.5 miles (2.4 km) outside the city of West Mineral. Along with the restored fort, historic Fort Scott has a national cemetery designated by President Lincoln in 1862. The region also shares a Media market with Joplin, Missouri, a city in Southwest Missouri.

==== Central and North-Central Kansas ====
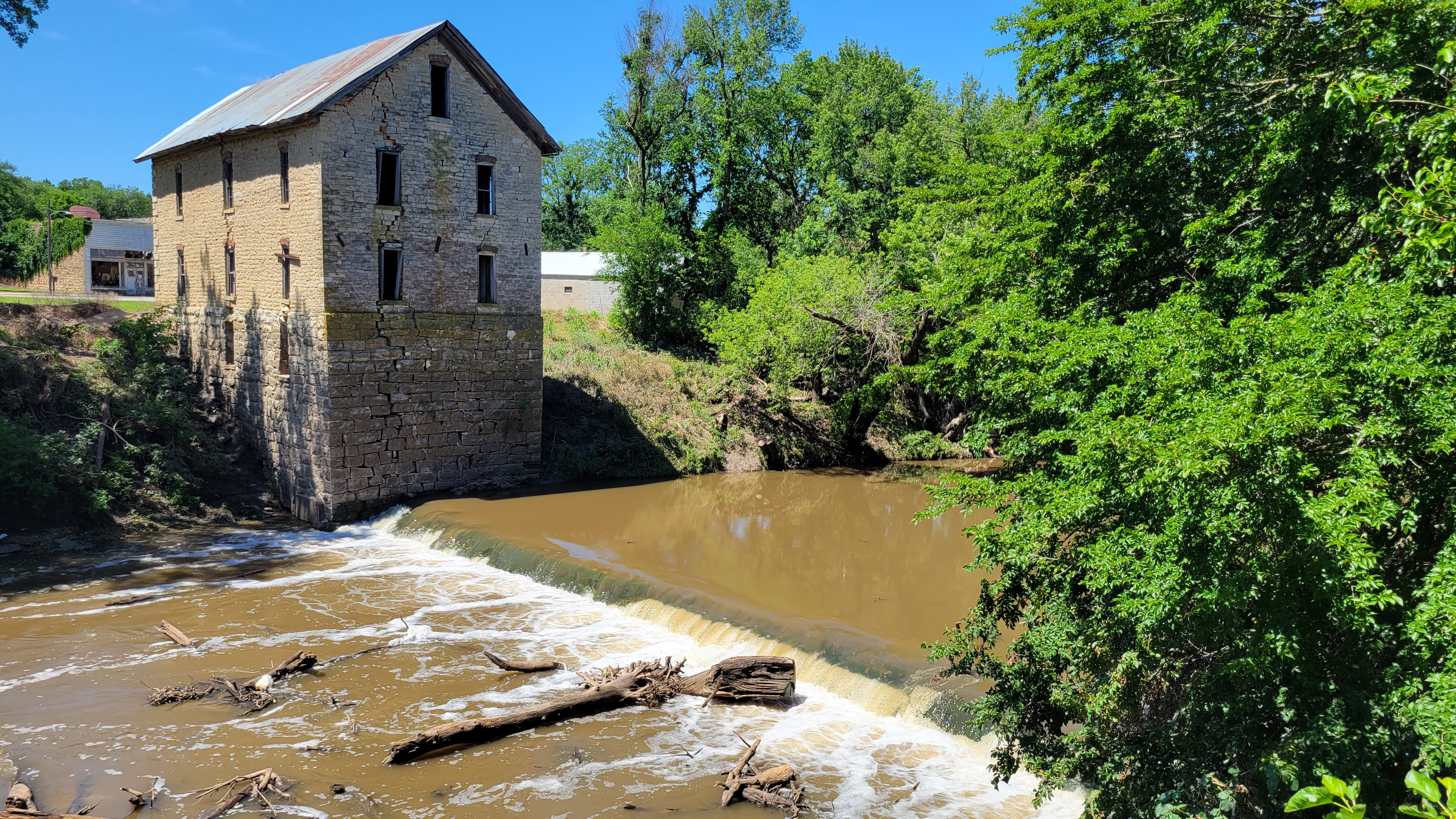
Cedar Point Mill, built in 1875 in Cedar Point, on the National Register of Historic Places

Salina is the largest city in central and north-central Kansas. South of Salina is the small city of Lindsborg with its numerous Dala horses. Much of the architecture and decor of this town has a distinctly Swedish style. To the east along Interstate 70, the historic city of Abilene was formerly a trailhead for the Chisholm Trail and was the boyhood home of President Dwight D. Eisenhower, and is the site of his Presidential Library and the tombs of the former president, First Lady and son who died in infancy. To the west is Lucas, the Grassroots Art Capital of Kansas.

==== Northwest Kansas ====
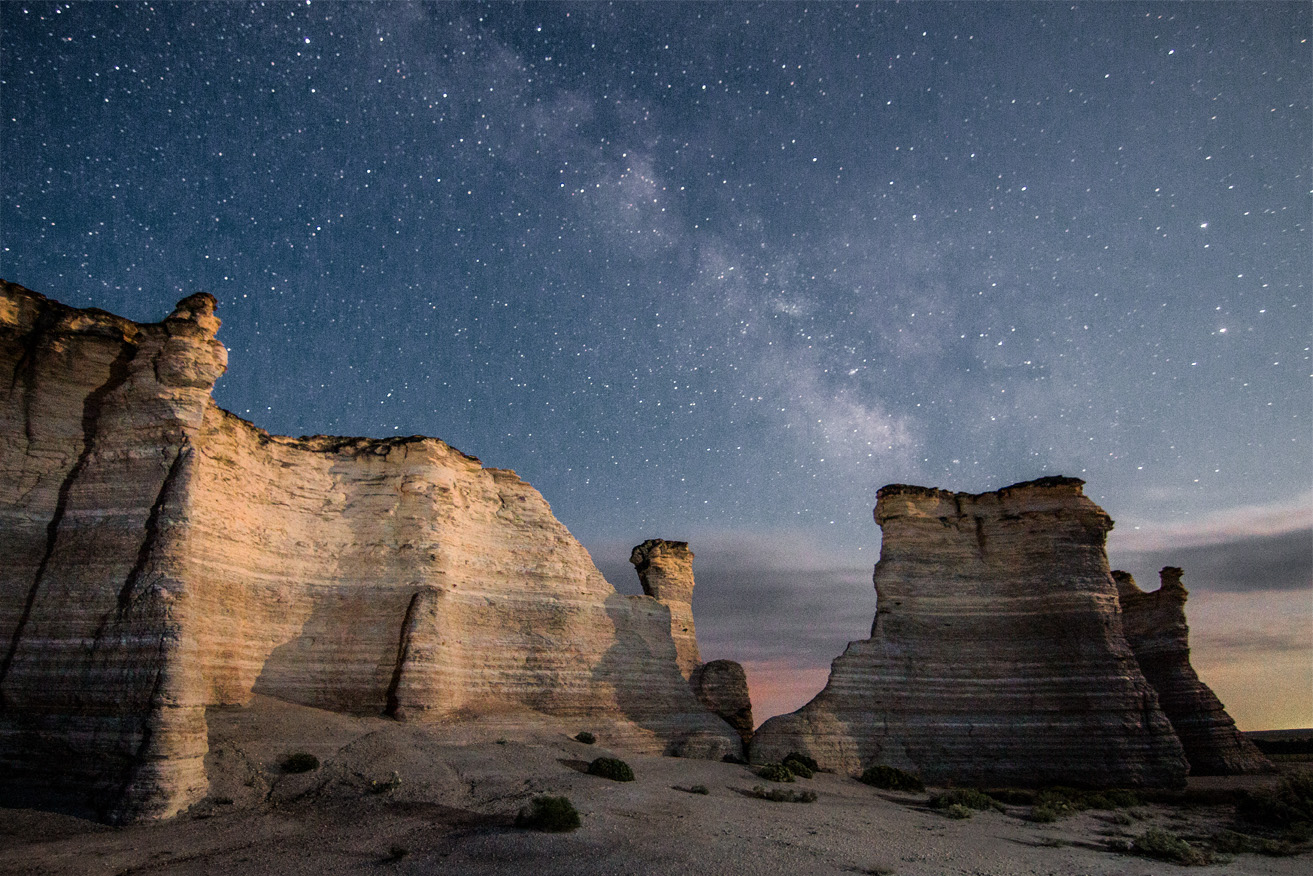
Kansas's Monument Rocks at night

Westward along the Interstate, the city of Russell, traditionally the beginning of sparsely populated northwest Kansas, was the base of former U.S. Senator Bob Dole and the boyhood home of U.S. Senator Arlen Specter. The city of Hays is home to Fort Hays State University and the Sternberg Museum of Natural History, and is the largest city in the northwest with a population of around 20,001.

Two other landmarks are located in smaller towns in Ellis County: the "Cathedral of the Plains" is located 10 miles (16 km) east of Hays in Victoria, and the boyhood home of Walter Chrysler is 15 miles (24 km) west of Hays in Ellis. West of Hays, population drops dramatically, even in areas along I-70, and only two towns containing populations of more than 4,000: Colby and Goodland, which are located 35 miles (56 km) apart along I-70.

==== Southwest Kansas ====
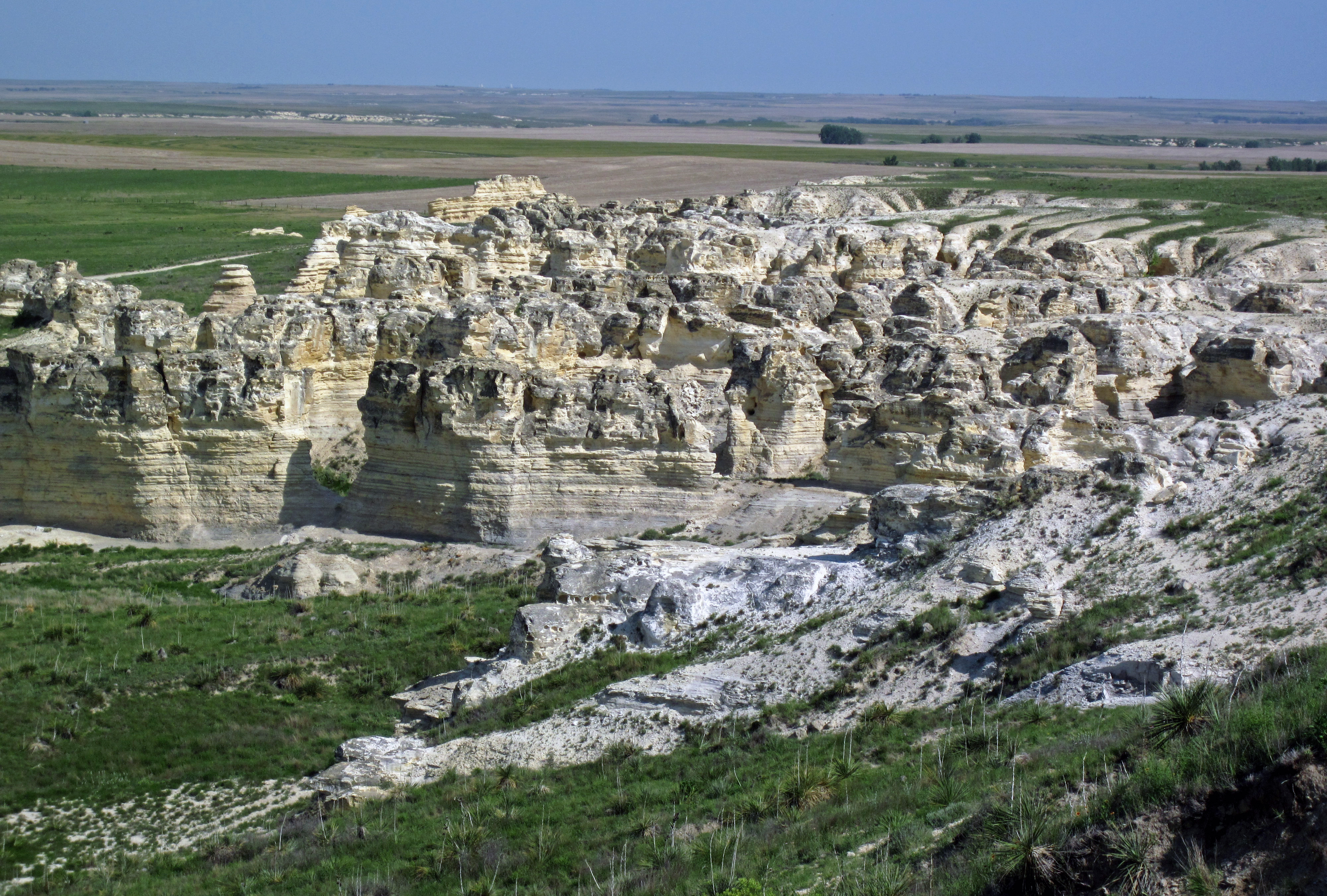
The chalk rock badlands and cliffs in western Kansas, near Dighton

Dodge City, famously known for the cattle drive days of the late 19th century, was built along the old Santa Fe Trail route. The city of Liberal is located along the southern Santa Fe Trail route. The first wind farm in the state was built east of Montezuma. Garden City has the Lee Richardson Zoo. In 1992, a short-lived secessionist movement advocated the secession of several counties in southwest Kansas.

==== Around the state ====
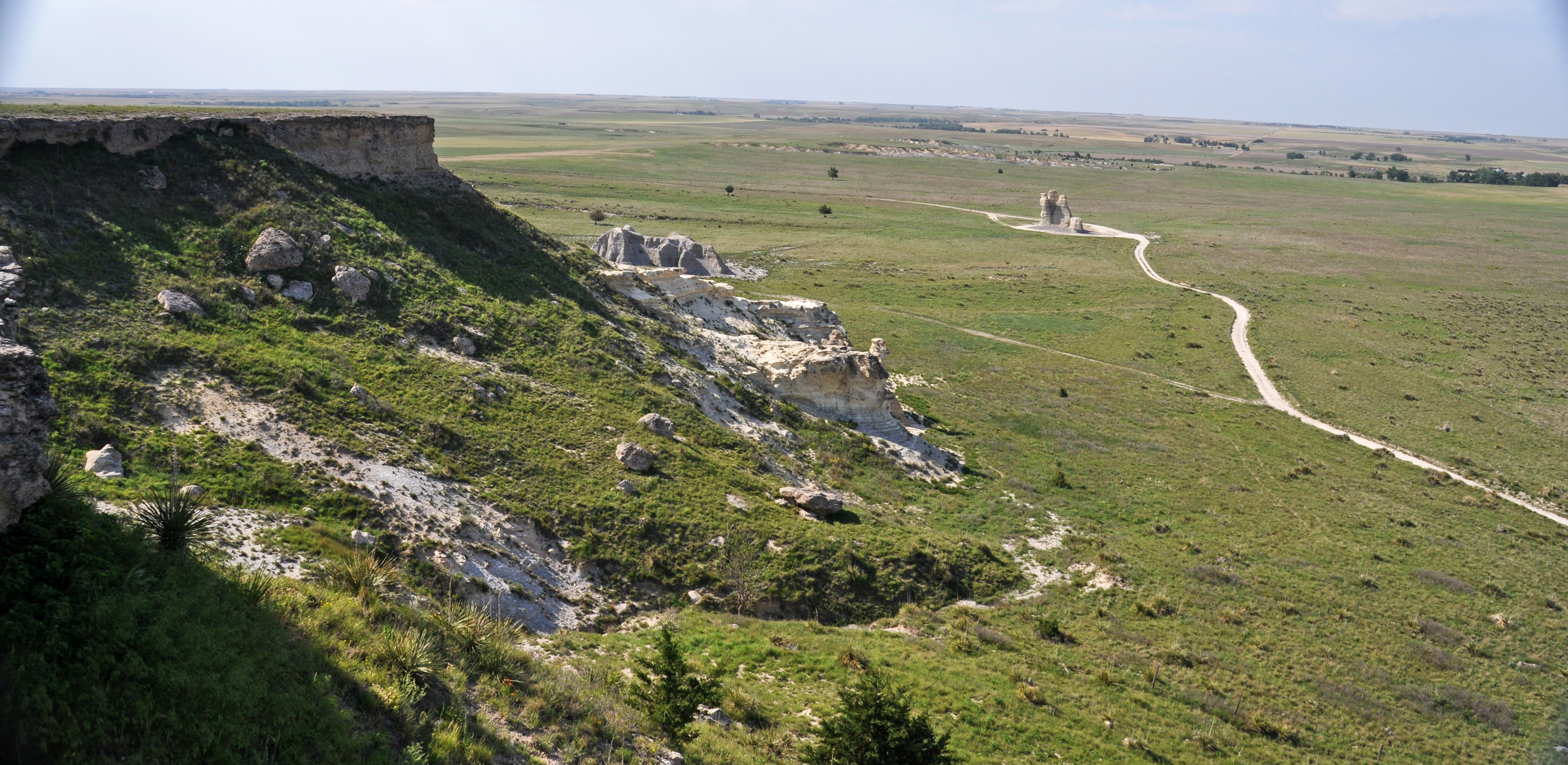
Gove County Badlands

Located midway between Kansas City, Topeka, and Wichita in the heart of the Bluestem Region of the Flint Hills, the city of Emporia has several nationally registered historic places and is the home of Emporia State University, well known for its Teachers College. It was also the home of newspaper man William Allen White.

== Demographics ==
=== Population ===
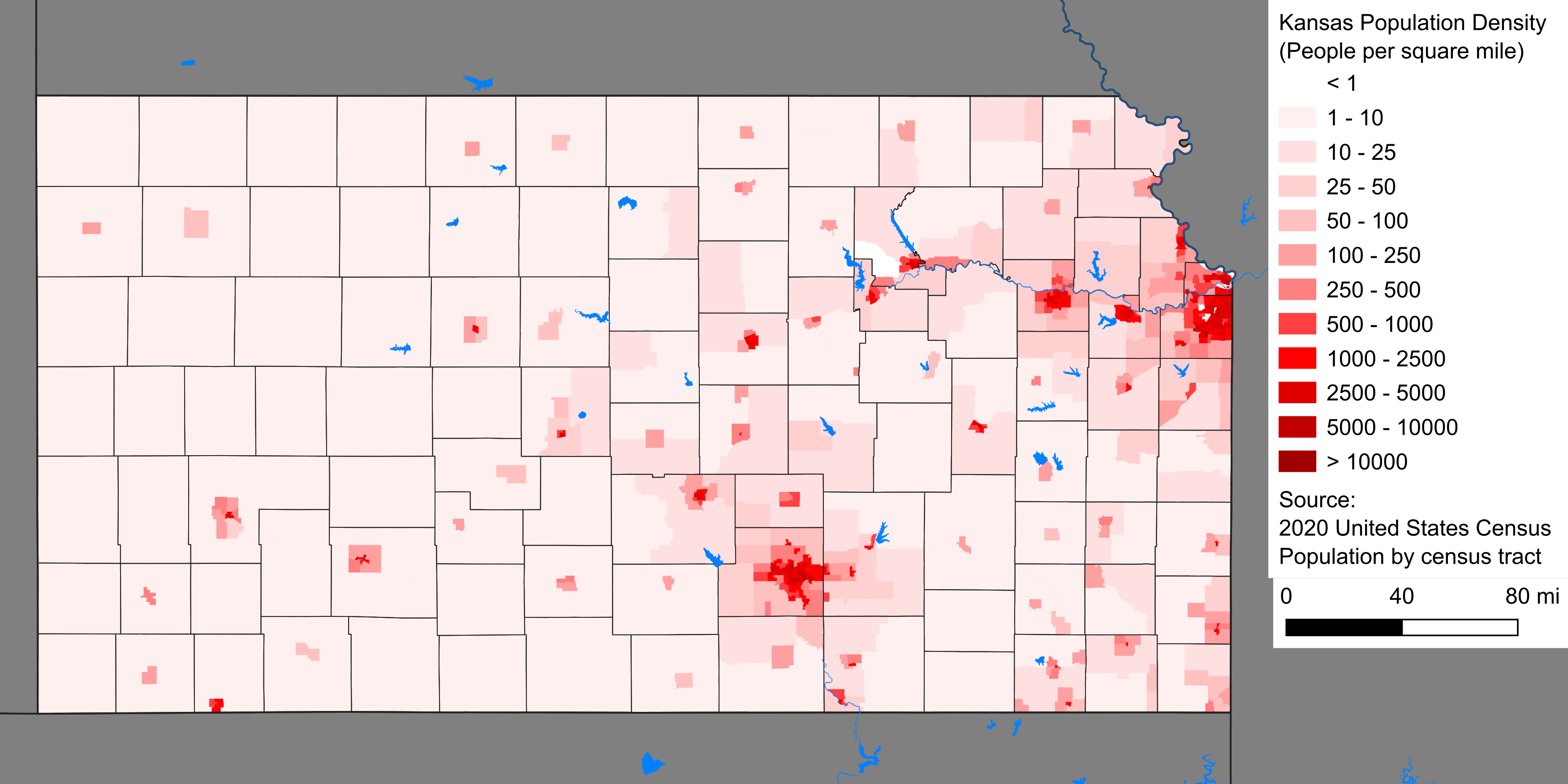
Population density map of Kansas in 2020

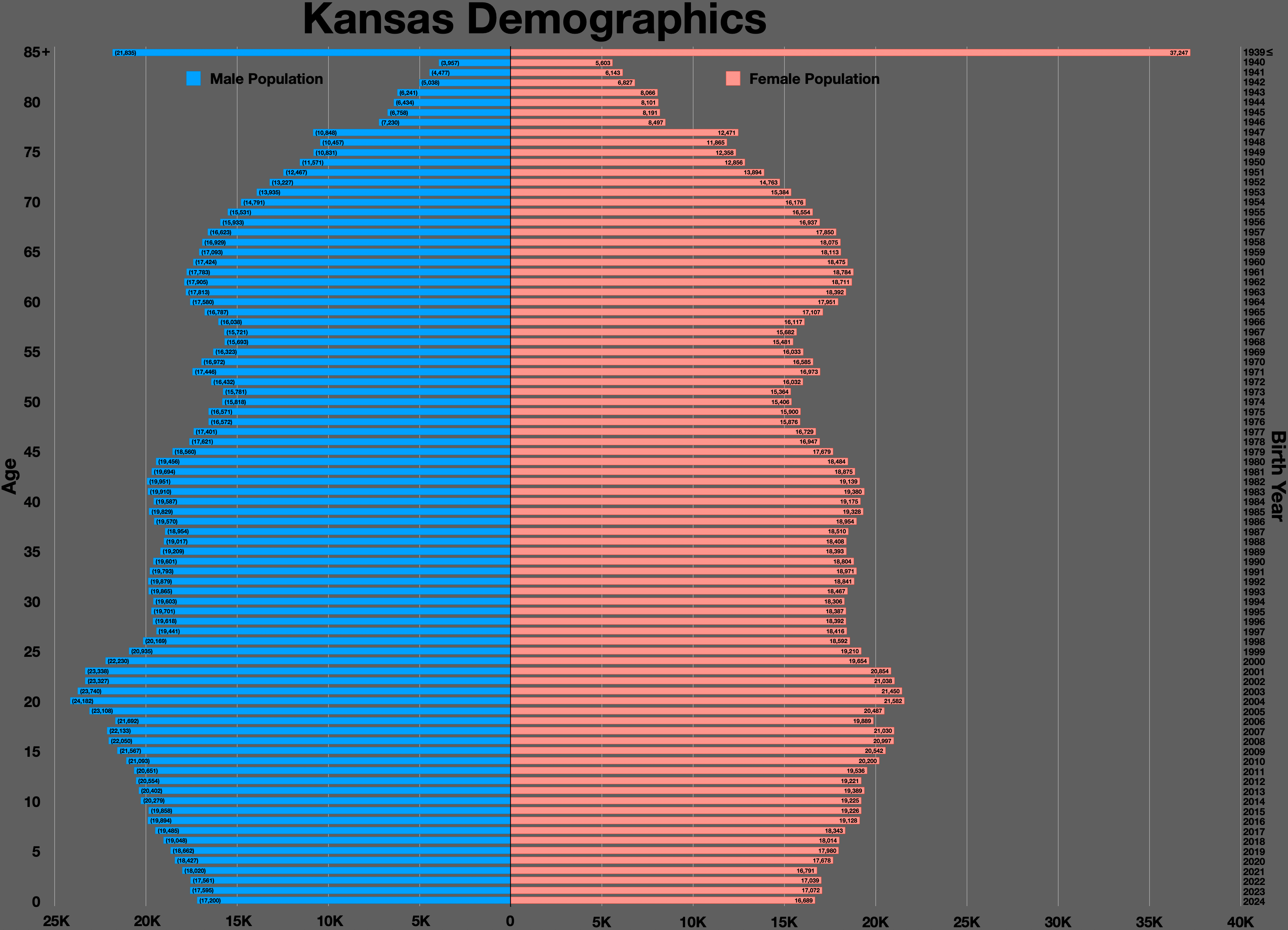
Kansas population pyramid

The United States Census Bureau estimates that the population of Kansas was 2,913,314 on July 1, 2019, a 2.11% increase since the 2010 United States census and an increase of 58,387, or 2.05%, since 2010. This includes a natural increase since the last census of 93,899 (246,484 births minus 152,585 deaths) and a decrease due to net migration of 20,742 people out of the state. Immigration from outside the United States resulted in a net increase of 44,847 people, and migration within the country produced a net loss of 65,589 people. At the 2020 census, its population was 2,937,880.

In 2018, the top countries of origin for Kansas's immigrants were Mexico, India, Vietnam, Guatemala and China.

The population density of Kansas is 52.9 people per square mile. The center of population of Kansas is located in Chase County, at 38°27′N 96°32′W, approximately 3 miles (4.8 km) north of the community of Strong City.

The focus on labor-efficient grain-based agriculture—such as a large wheat farm that requires only one or a few people with large machinery to operate, rather than a vegetable farm that requires many people—is causing the de-population of rural areas across Kansas.

According to HUD's 2022 Annual Homeless Assessment Report, there were an estimated 2,397 homeless people in Kansas.

Historical population
Census	Pop.	Note	%±
1860	107,206		—
1870	364,399		239.9%
1880	996,096		173.4%
1890	1,428,108		43.4%
1900	1,470,495		3.0%
1910	1,690,949		15.0%
1920	1,769,257		4.6%
1930	1,880,999		6.3%
1940	1,801,028		−4.3%
1950	1,905,299		5.8%
1960	2,178,611		14.3%
1970	2,246,578		3.1%
1980	2,363,679		5.2%
1990	2,477,574		4.8%
2000	2,688,418		8.5%
2010	2,853,118		6.1%
2020	2,937,880		3.0%
2025 (est.)	2,977,220		1.3%
1910–2020

=== Race and ethnicity ===
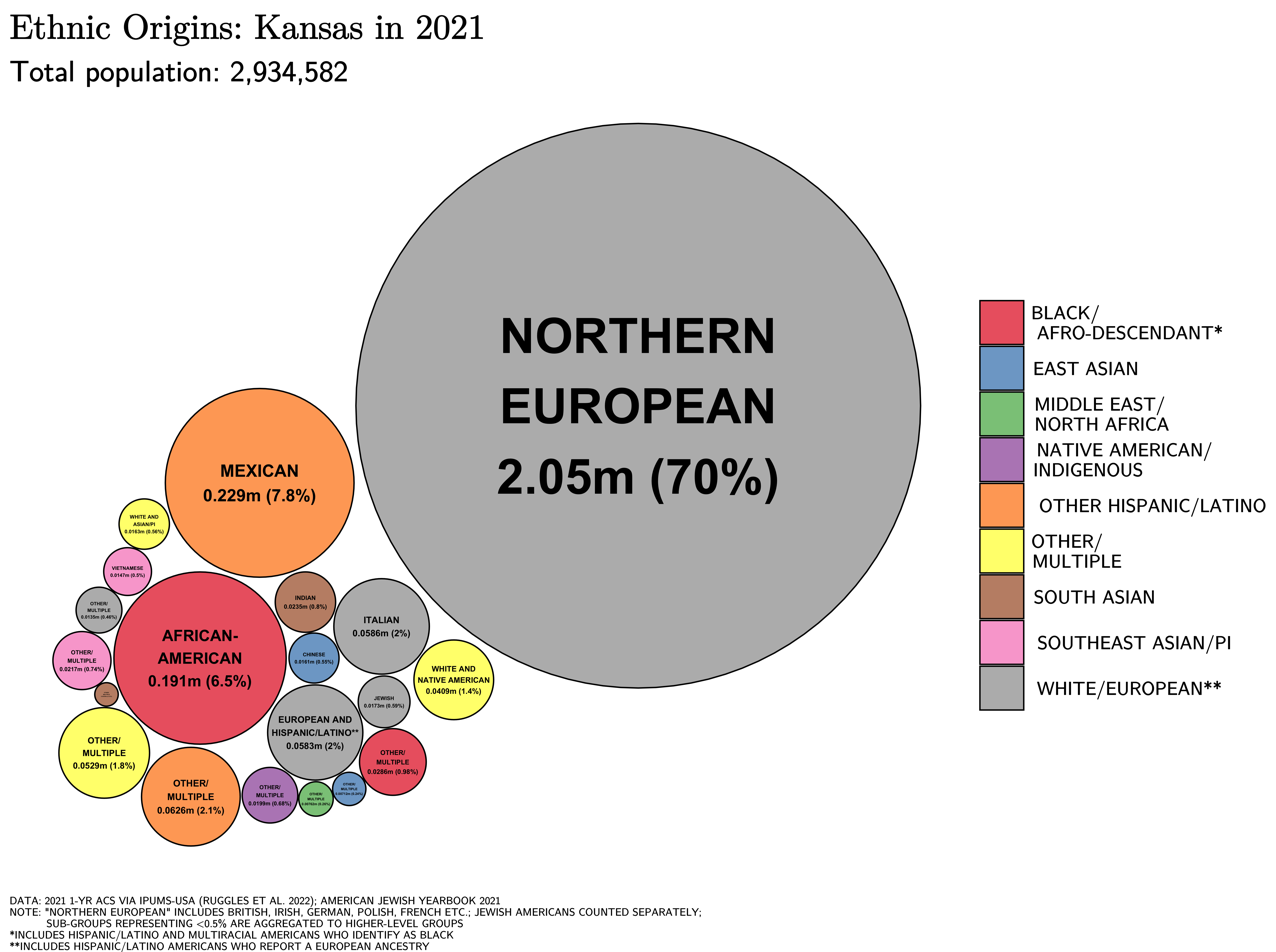
Ethnic origins in Kansas

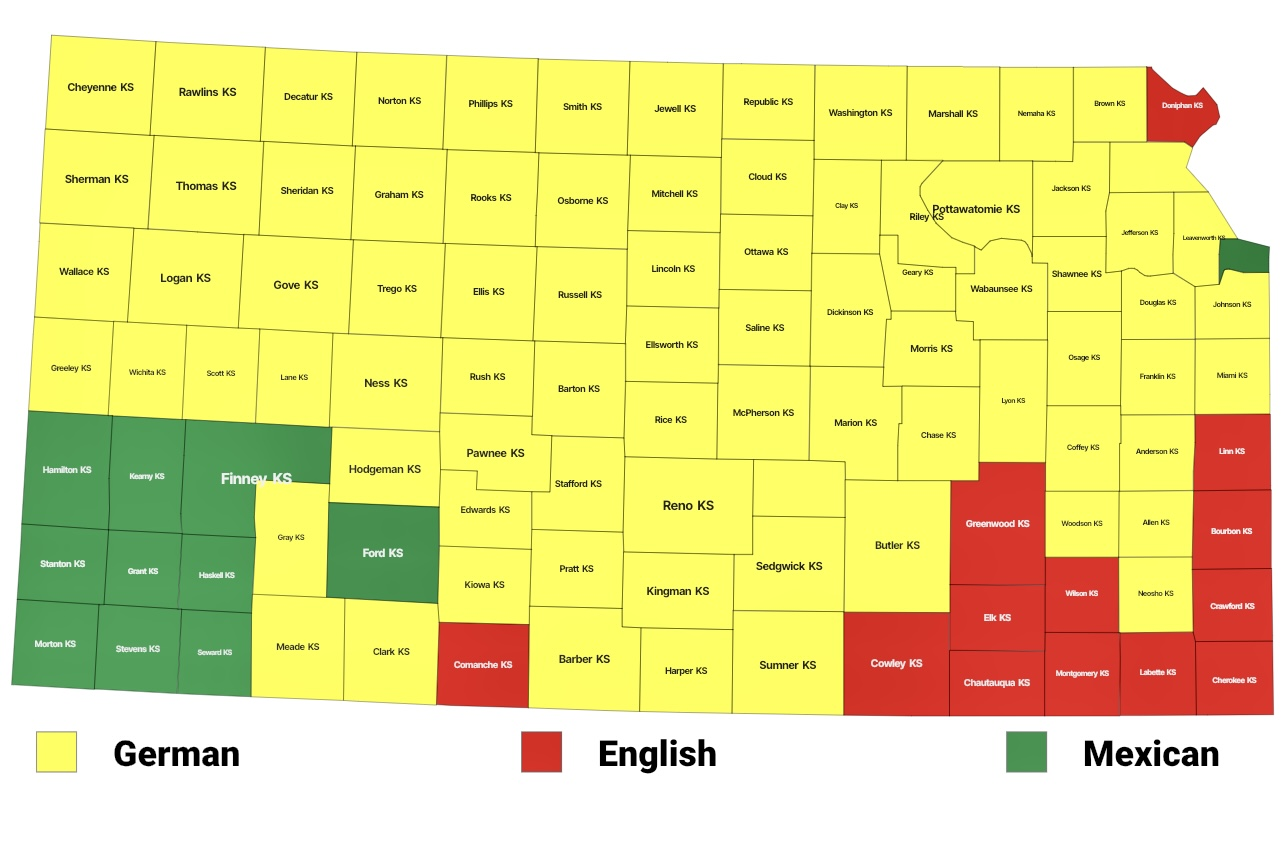
Largest alone or in any combination ethnic origin by county in Kansas, per the 2020 census

According to the 2021 United States census estimates, the racial makeup of the population was: White American, non-Hispanic (74.7%), Hispanic or Latino (12.7%), Black or African American (6.2%), Native Hawaiian or other Pacific Islander (0.1%), two or more races (3.3%), Asian (3.2%), and American Indian and Alaska Native (1.2%). At the 2020 census, its racial and ethnic makeup was 75.6% White, 5.7% African American, 2.9% Asian American, 1.1% Native American, 0.1% Pacific Islander, 4.9% some other race, and 9.5% two or more races.

Kansas racial breakdown of population
Racial composition	1990	2000	2010	2020
White	90.1%	86.1%	83.8%	75.6%
Black	5.8%	5.8%	5.9%	5.7%
Asian	1.3%	1.7%	2.4%	2.9%
Native	0.9%	0.9%	1.0%	1.1%
Native Hawaiian and other Pacific Islander	–	–	0.1%	0.1%
Other race	2.0%	3.4%	3.9%	4.9%
Two or more races	–	2.1%	3.0%	9.5%

Map of counties in Kansas by racial plurality, per the 2020 U.S. census Legend: | Non-Hispanic White 30–40% 50–60% 60–70% 70–80% 80–90% 90%+ | Hispanic or Latino 50–60% 60–70% |

Kansas – Racial and ethnic composition Note: the US Census treats Hispanic/Latino as an ethnic category. This table excludes Latinos from the racial categories and assigns them to a separate category. Hispanics/Latinos may be of any race.
Race / Ethnicity (NH = Non-Hispanic)	Pop 1980	Pop 1990	Pop 2000	Pop 2010	Pop 2020	% 1980	% 1990	% 2000	% 2010	% 2020
White alone (NH)	2,138,516	2,190,524	2,233,997	2,230,539	2,122,575	90.47%	88.41%	83.10%	78.18%	72.25%
Black or African American alone (NH)	124,820	140,761	151,407	162,700	163,352	5.28%	5.68%	5.63%	5.70%	5.56%
Native American or Alaska Native alone (NH)	15,311	20,363	22,322	23,073	21,921	0.65%	0.82%	0.83%	0.81%	0.75%
Asian alone (NH)	15,061	30,814	46,301	66,967	85,225	0.64%	1.24%	1.72%	2.35%	2.90%
Native Hawaiian or Pacific Islander alone (NH)	x	x	1,154	1,978	3,115	x	x	0.04%	0.07%	0.11%
Other race alone (NH)	6,632	1,442	2,477	2,928	10,064	0.28%	0.06%	0.09%	0.10%	0.34%
Mixed race or Multiracial (NH)	x	x	42,508	64,891	149,025	x	x	1.58%	2.27%	5.07%
Hispanic or Latino (any race)	63,339	93,670	188,252	300,042	382,603	2.68%	3.78%	7.00%	10.52%	13.02%
Total	2,363,679	2,477,574	2,688,418	2,853,118	2,937,880	100.00%	100.00%	100.00%	100.00%	100.00%

As of 2004, the population included 149,800 foreign-born (5.5% of the state population). The ten largest reported ancestry groups, which account for nearly 90% of the population, in the state are: German (33.75%), Irish (14.4%), English (14.1%), American (7.5%), French (4.4%), Scottish (4.2%), Dutch (2.5%), Swedish (2.4%), Italian (1.8%), and Polish (1.5%). Kansas is also home to a large Czech community.

Mexicans are present in the southwest and make up nearly half the population in certain counties. Many African Americans in Kansas are descended from the Exodusters, newly freed blacks who fled the South for land in Kansas following the Civil War.

There is a growing Asian community in Kansas. Since 1965, more and more Asian families have moved to Kansas from countries such as the Philippines, China, Korea, India, and Vietnam.

Birth data

Live births by single race/ethnicity of mother
Race	2013	2014	2015	2016	2017	2018	2019	2020	2021	2022	2023
White	28,504 (72.7%)	28,236 (72.1%)	26,935 (70.8%)	25,594 (70.1%)	25,323 (69.8%)	24,549 (69.4%)	23,663 (68.8%)	24,056 (69.3%)	23,669 (68.8%)	23,088 (67.8%)	22,535 (66.3%)
Black	3,097 (7.9%)	3,090 (7.9%)	2,543 (6.7%)	2,657 (7.3%)	2,575 (7.1%)	2,458 (6.9%)	2,412 (7.0%)	2,316 (6.7%)	2,208 (6.4%)	2,211 (6.5%)	2,099 (6.2%)
Asian	1,359 (3.5%)	1,483 (3.8%)	1,299 (3.4%)	1,255 (3.4%)	1,228 (3.4%)	1,216 (3.4%)	1,146 (3.3%)	1,031 (3.0%)	1,055 (3.1%)	1,028 (3.0%)	1,011 (3.0%)
American Indian	347 (0.9%)	330 (0.8%)	173 (0.5%)	248 (0.7%)	217 (0.6%)	214 (0.6%)	162 (0.5%)	183 (0.5%)	163 (0.5%)	142 (0.4%)	149 (0.4%)
Hispanic (any race)	6,132 (15.6%)	6,300 (16.1%)	6,298 (16.5%)	5,963 (16.3%)	5,977 (16.5%)	6,071 (17.2%)	5,970 (17.4%)	6,122 (17.6%)	6,309 (18.3%)	6,576 (19.3%)	7,051 (20.7%)
Total	39,223 (100%)	39,154 (100%)	38,053 (100%)	36,519 (100%)	36,261 (100%)	35,395 (100%)	34,376 (100%)	34,705 (100%)	34,401 (100%)	34,065 (100%)	33,984 (100%)

As of 2011, 35.0% of Kansas's population younger than one year of age belonged to minority groups (i.e., did not have two parents of non-Hispanic white ancestry).

=== Native Americans ===

Kansas serves as the home to four federally recognized sovereign Native American nations. The preponderance of the state's Native American population resides on reservations.

=== Language ===
English is the most-spoken language in Kansas, with 91.3% of the population speaking only English at home as of the year 2000. 5.5% speak Spanish, 0.7% speak German, and 0.4% speak Vietnamese.

Kansa represents the indigenous language spoken by the Kansa people, a Native American nation historically associated with the state of Kansas.

=== Religion ===
Religion in Kansas (2022), per PRRI
1. Christianity (74.0%)
2. Irreligion (23.0%)
3. Unitarian Universalism (1.00%)
4. New Age (1.00%)

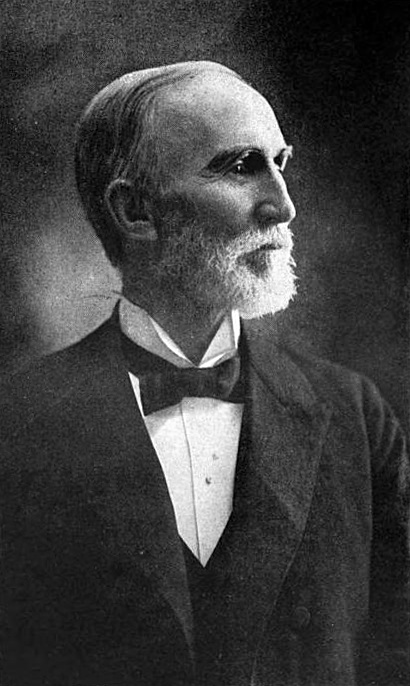
Rev. Richard Cordley, the first graduate of the University of Kansas, and nicknamed "The Abolition Preacher", due to his strong views against slavery, and his influence on Kansas's founding as a free state

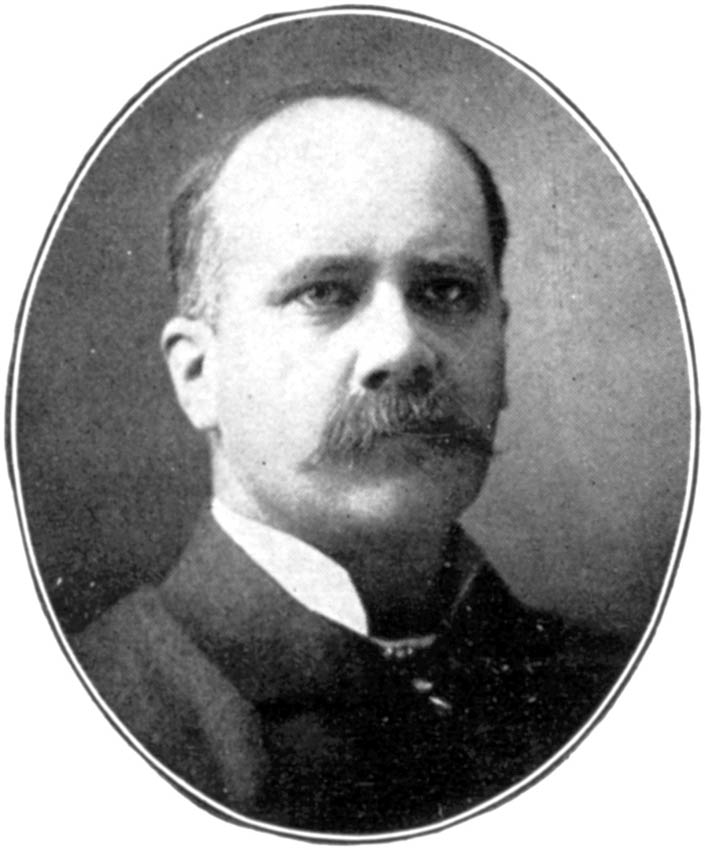
Reverend Charles Sheldon, Topeka resident and coiner of the phrase "What would Jesus do?"

The 2014 Pew Religious Landscape Survey showed the religious makeup of adults in Kansas was as follows: 57% Protestant, 18% Catholic, 1% Mormon, 1% Jehovah's Witness, 20% unaffiliated, 1% Buddhist, and 2% other religions. In 2022, the Public Religion Research Institute (PRRI)'s study revealed 74% of the total population were Christian; among them, 59% were Protestant, 13% Catholic, and 2% Mormon. The religiously unaffiliated were 23% of the population, Unitarian Universalists 1%, and New Agers 1%.

Kansas's capital Topeka is sometimes cited as the home of Pentecostalism as it was the site of Charles Fox Parham's Bethel Bible College, where glossolalia was first claimed as the evidence of a spiritual experience referred to as the baptism of the Holy Spirit in 1901. It is also the home of Reverend Charles Sheldon, author of In His Steps, and was the site where the question "What would Jesus do?" originated in a sermon of Sheldon's at Central Congregational Church.

Kansas is the location of the second Baháʼí Faith community west of Egypt, when the Baháʼí community of Enterprise, KS was started in 1897. From that beginning the Baháʼí Faith spread across Kansas.

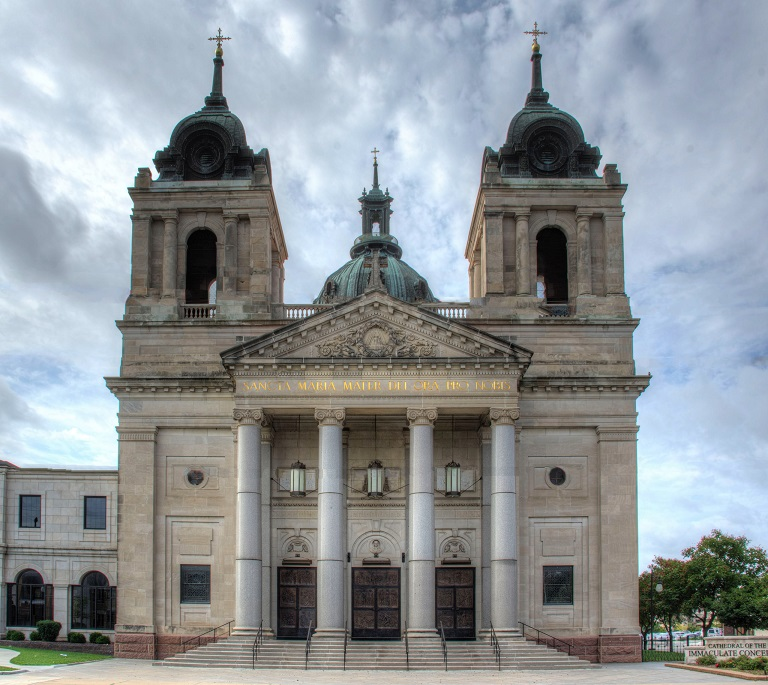
The Cathedral of the Immaculate Conception in Wichita

Topeka is also home of the Westboro Baptist Church, a hate group according to the Southern Poverty Law Center. The church has garnered worldwide media attention for picketing the funerals of U.S. servicemen and women for what church members claim as "necessary to combat the fight for equality for gays and lesbians". They have sometimes successfully raised lawsuits against the city of Topeka.

=== Largest immigrant groups ===
#	Country	Population
1	Mexico	81,933
2	India	13,526
3	Vietnam	11,119
4	China	8,223
5	Guatemala	6,271
6	Philippines	5,005
7	South Korea	4,108
8	El Salvador	3,919
9	Laos	3,447
10	Germany	3,326

== Economy ==
Kansas's total GDP (Gross Domestic Product) was $241.3 billion in 2025. The state's per capita personal income was $69,510 in 2025, which ranked 33rd among U.S. states, and median household income was measured at $68,925.

Total Employment of the metropolitan areas in the State of Kansas by total Non-farm Employment in 2016.

- Kansas Portion of the Kansas City MO-KS MSA: 468,400 non-farm, accounting for 40.9% of state GDP in 2015.
- Wichita, KS MSA: 297,300 non-farm
- Topeka, KS MSA: 112,600 non-farm
- Lawrence KS, MSA: 54,000 non-farm
- Manhattan, KS MSA: 44,200 non-farm
- Total employment: 1,184,710

As of 2023, Kansas had a total of 76,139 employer establishments. In 2025, small businesses made up 99.1% of all businesses in Kansas and employed 48.9% of the state's work force.

In 2015, the job growth rate was 0.8%, among the lowest rates in America with only "10,900 total nonfarm jobs" added that year. As of May 2025, the state's unemployment rate was 3.8%.

The State of Kansas had a $350 million budget shortfall in February 2017. In February 2017, S&P downgraded Kansas's credit rating to AA−.

Nearly 90% of Kansas's land is devoted to agriculture. The state's agricultural outputs are cattle, sheep, wheat, sorghum, soybeans, cotton, hogs, corn, and salt. As of 2018, there were 59,600 farms in Kansas, 86 (0.14%) of which are certified organic farms. The average farm in the state is about 770 acres (more than a square mile), and in 2016, the average cost of running the farm was $300,000.

By far, the most significant agricultural crop in the state is wheat. Eastern Kansas is part of the Grain Belt, an area of major grain production in the central United States. Approximately 40% of all winter wheat grown in the U.S. is grown in Kansas. Roughly 95% of the wheat grown in the state is hard red winter wheat. During 2016, farmers of conventionally grown wheat farmed 8.2 million acres and harvested an average of 57 bushels of wheat per acre.

The industrial outputs are transportation equipment, commercial and private aircraft, food processing, publishing, chemical products, machinery, apparel, petroleum, and mining.

Largest private employers (as of 2016)
Rank	Business	Employees	Location	Industry
1	Spirit AeroSystems	12,000	Wichita	Aviation
2	Sprint Corporation	7,600	Overland Park	Telecommunications
3	Textron Aviation	6,812	Wichita	Aviation
4	General Motors	4,000	Kansas City	Automotive manufacturing
5	Bombardier Aerospace	3,500	Wichita	Aviation
6	Black & Veatch	3,500	Overland Park	Engineering consulting
7	National Beef	3,500	Liberal	Food products
8	Tyson Foods	3,200	Holcomb	Food products
9	Performance Contracting	2,900	Lenexa	Roofing and siding
10	National Beef	2,500	Dodge City	Food products

The state's economy is also heavily influenced by the aerospace industry. Several large aircraft corporations have manufacturing facilities in Wichita and Kansas City, including Spirit AeroSystems, Bombardier Aerospace (LearJet), and Textron Aviation (a merger of the former Cessna, Hawker, and Beechcraft brands). Boeing ended a decades-long history of manufacturing in Kansas between 2012 and 2013.

Major companies headquartered in Kansas include the Garmin (Olathe), YRC Worldwide (Overland Park), and Koch, Inc. (with national headquarters in Wichita).

Kansas is also home to three major military installations: Fort Leavenworth (Army), Fort Riley (Army), and McConnell Air Force Base (Air Force). Approximately 25,000 active duty soldiers and airmen are stationed at these bases which also employ approximately 8,000 civilian DoD employees. The U.S. Army Reserve also has the 451st Expeditionary Sustainment Command headquartered in Wichita that serves reservists and their units from around the region. The Kansas Air National Guard has units at Forbes Field in Topeka and the 184th Intelligence Wing in Wichita. The Smoky Hill Weapons Range, a detachment of the Intelligence Wing, is one of the largest and busiest bombing ranges in the nation. During World War II, Kansas was home to numerous Army Air Corps training fields for training new pilots and aircrew. Many of those airfields live on today as municipal airports.

=== Energy ===
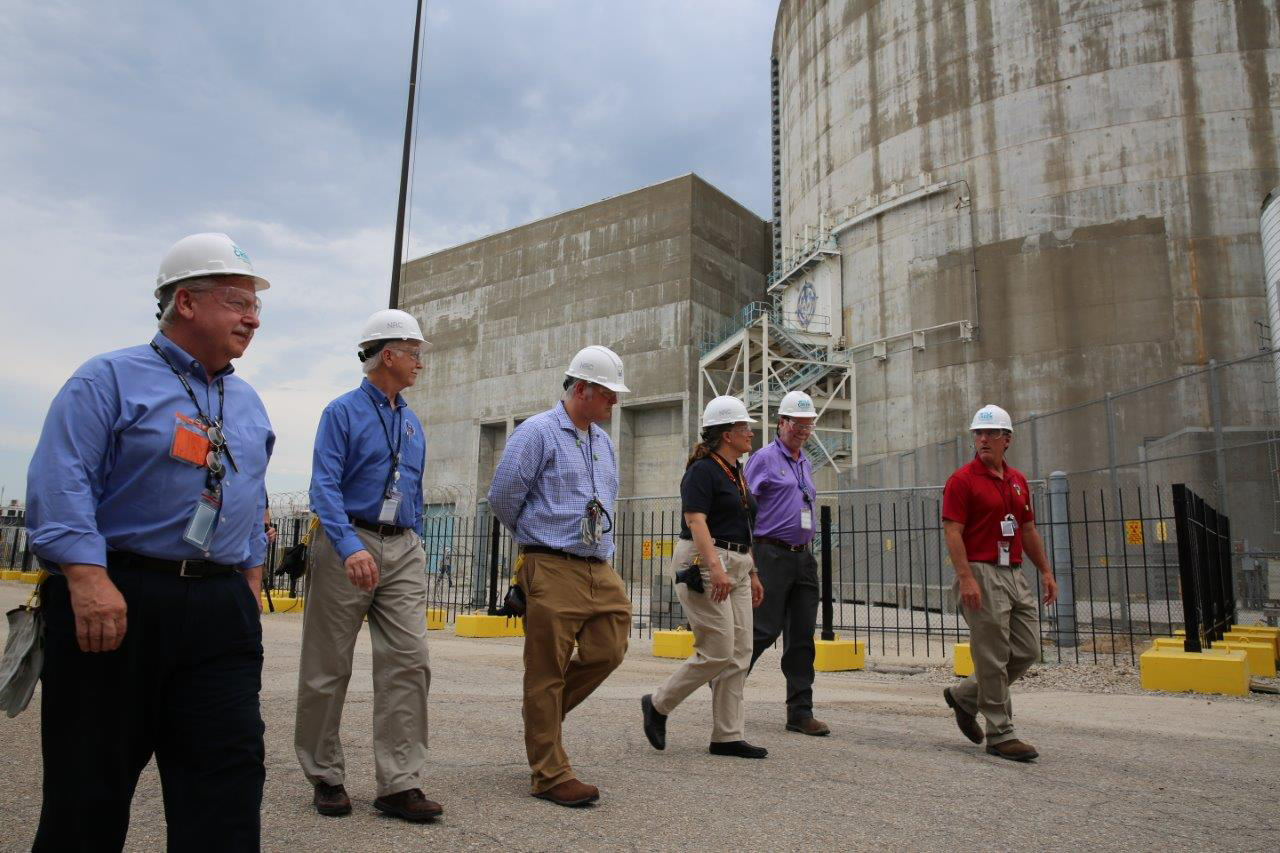
NRC workers at the Wolf Creek Nuclear Power Plant in Burlington

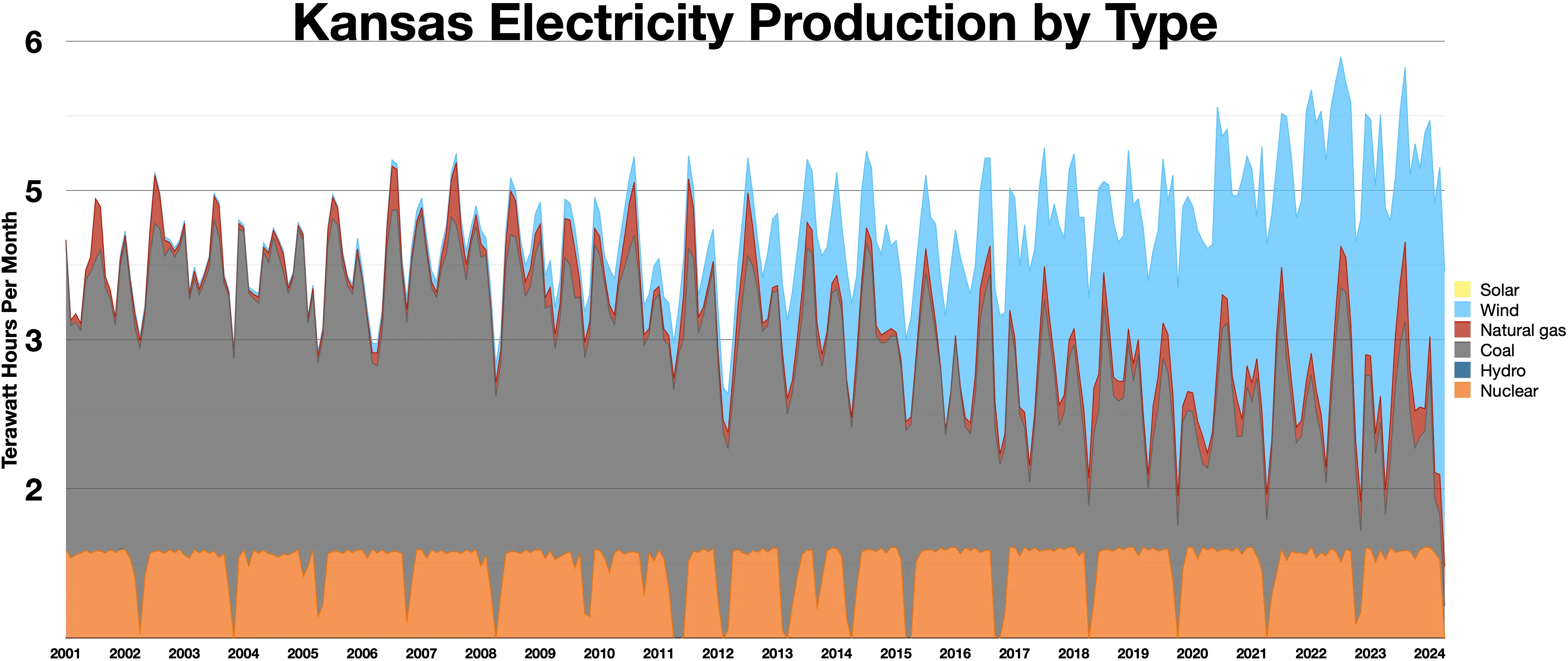
Kansas electricity production by type

Kansas has vast renewable resources and is a top producer of wind energy in the US, with an installed capacity of about 6,100 Megawatts (MW) from nearly 3,200 wind turbines in 2019. Wind generated the largest share of electricity from the state at 41%. An additional 700 MW of capacity was scheduled to come online during 2020. Kansas is also a leading national producer of renewable ethanol and biodiesel fuels at nearly 600 million gallons per year.

Kansas is one of 28 states with a nuclear power plant, Wolf Creek in Burlington, which houses a Westinghouse pressurized water reactor. The plant came online in 1985, and cost over $5 billion to construct. It is owned by Evergy.

Kansas is ranked eighth in U.S. petroleum extraction. Production has experienced a steady decline as the state's limited economical reserves especially from the Anadarko Basin are depleted. Since oil prices bottomed in 1999, oil production in Kansas has remained fairly constant, with an average monthly rate of about 2.8 million barrels (450,000 cubic meters) in 2004. The recent higher prices have made carbon dioxide sequestration and other oil recovery techniques more economical.

Kansas is also ranked eighth in U.S. natural gas production. Production has steadily declined since the mid-1990s with the gradual depletion of the Hugoton Natural Gas Field—the state's largest field which extends into Oklahoma and Texas. In 2004, slower declines in the Hugoton gas fields and increased coalbed methane production contributed to a smaller overall decline. Average monthly production was over 32 billion cubic feet (0.91 cubic kilometers).

=== Taxes ===
Tax is collected by the Kansas Department of Revenue.

Revenue shortfalls resulting from lower than expected tax collections and slower growth in personal income following a 1998 permanent tax reduction have contributed to the substantial growth in the state's debt level as bonded debt increased from $1.16 billion in 1998 to $3.83 billion in 2006. Some increase in debt was expected as the state continues with its 10-year Comprehensive Transportation Program enacted in 1999.

In 2003, Kansas had three income brackets for income tax calculation, ranging from 3.5% to 6.45%.

The state sales tax in Kansas is 6.15%. Various cities and counties in Kansas have an additional local sales tax. Except during the 2001 recession (March–November 2001), when monthly sales tax collections were flat, collections have trended higher as the economy has grown and two rate increases have been enacted. If there had been no change in sales tax rates or in the economy, the total sales tax collections for 2003 would have been $1,797 million, compared to $805.3 million in 1990. However, they instead amounted to $1,630 million an inflation-adjusted reduction of 10%. The state sales tax is a combined destination-based tax, meaning a single tax is applied that includes state, county, and local taxes, and the rate is based on where the consumer takes possession of the goods or services. Thanks to the destination structure and the numerous local special taxing districts, Kansas has 920 separate sales tax rates ranging from 6.5% to 11.5%. This taxing scheme, known as "Streamlined Sales Tax" was adopted on October 1, 2005, under the governorship of Kathleen Sebelius. Groceries are subject to sales tax in the state. All sales tax collected is remitted to the state department of revenue, and local taxes are then distributed to the various taxing agencies.

As of June 2004, Moody's Investors Service ranked the state 14th for net tax-supported debt per capita. As a percentage of personal income, it was at 3.8%—above the median value of 2.5% for all rated states and having risen from a value of less than 1% in 1992. The state has a statutory requirement to maintain cash reserves of at least 7.5% of expenses at the end of each fiscal year; however, lawmakers can vote to override the rule, and did so during the most recent budget agreement.

During his campaign for the 2010 election, Governor Sam Brownback called for a complete "phase out of Kansas's income tax". In May 2012, Governor Brownback signed into law the Kansas Senate Bill Substitute HB 2117. Starting in 2013, the "ambitious tax overhaul" trimmed income tax, eliminated some corporate taxes, and created pass-through income tax exemptions, he raised the sales tax by one percent to offset the loss to state revenues but that was inadequate. He made cuts to education and some state services to offset lost revenue. The tax cut led to years of budget shortfalls, culminating in a $350 million budget shortfall in February 2017. From 2013 to 2017, 300,000 businesses were considered to be pass-through income entities and benefited from the tax exemption. The tax reform "encouraged tens of thousands of Kansans to claim their wages and salaries as income from a business rather than from employment."

The economic growth that Brownback anticipated never materialized. He argued that it was because of "low wheat and oil prices and a downturn in aircraft sales". The state general fund debt load was $83 million in fiscal year 2010 and by fiscal year 2017 the debt load sat at $179 million. In 2016, Governor Brownback earned the title of "most unpopular governor in America". Only 26 percent of Kansas voters approved of his job performance, compared to 65 percent who said they did not. In the summer of 2016 S&P Global Ratings downgraded Kansas's credit rating. In February 2017, S&P lowered it to AA−.

In February 2017, a bi-partisan coalition presented a bill that would repeal the pass-through income exemption, the "most important provisions of Brownback's overhaul", and raise taxes to make up for the budget shortfall. Brownback vetoed the bill but "45 GOP legislators had voted in favor of the increase, while 40 voted to uphold the governor's veto." On June 6, 2017, a coalition of Democrats and newly elected Republicans overrode [Brownback's] veto and implemented tax increases to a level close to what it was before 2013. Brownback's tax overhaul was described in a June 2017 article in The Atlantic as the United States' "most aggressive experiment in conservative economic policy". The drastic tax cuts had "threatened the viability of schools and infrastructure" in Kansas.

== Transportation ==
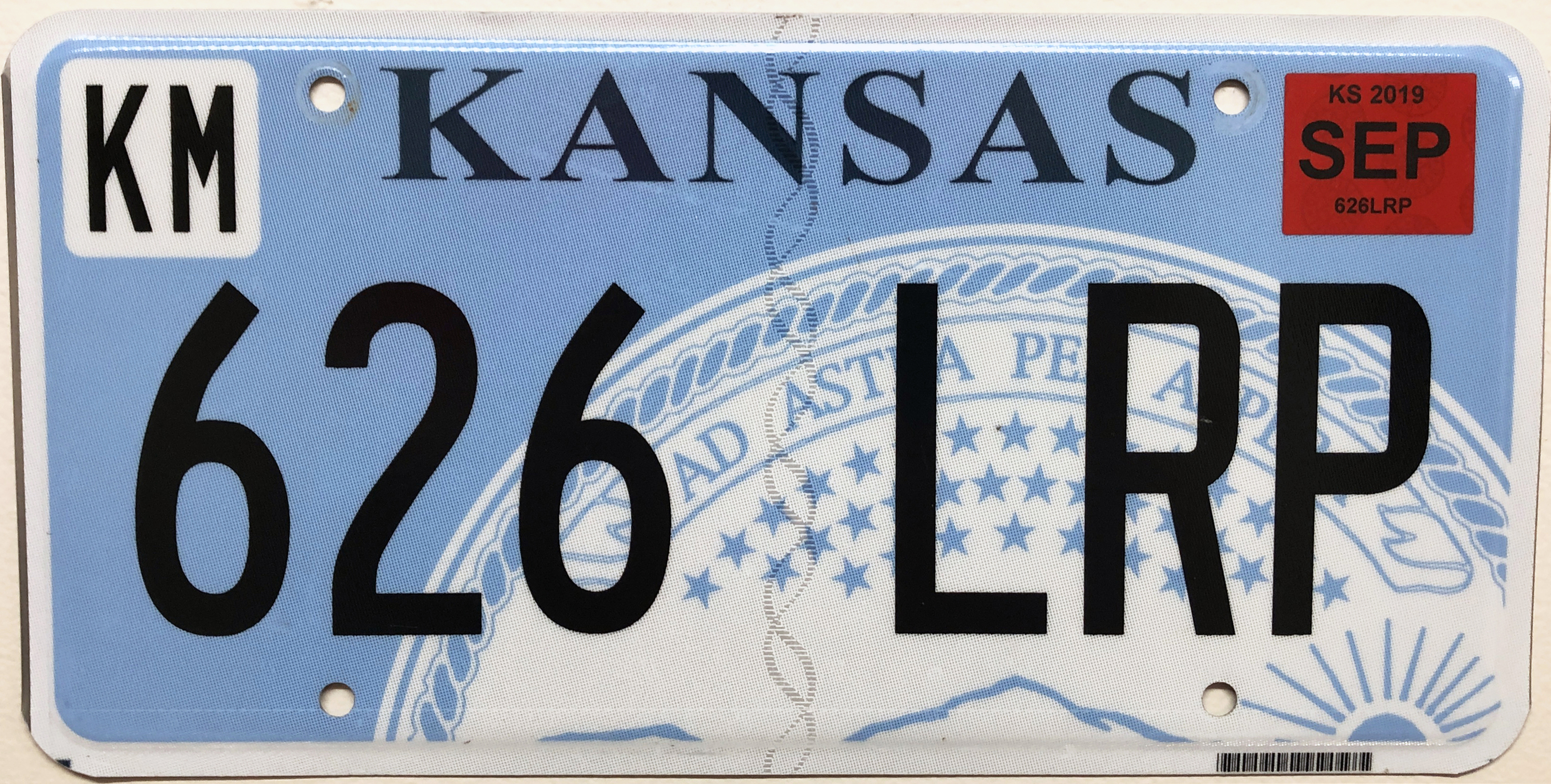
Standard Kansas license plate, 2018–2024

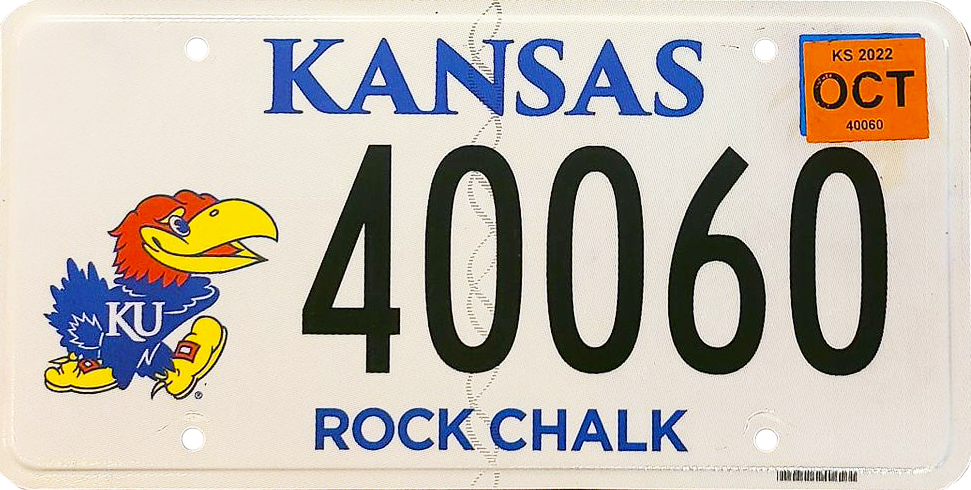
An example of a custom Kansas rear license plate. Kansas allows residents to purchase license plates with college and university logos on them for an extra fee.

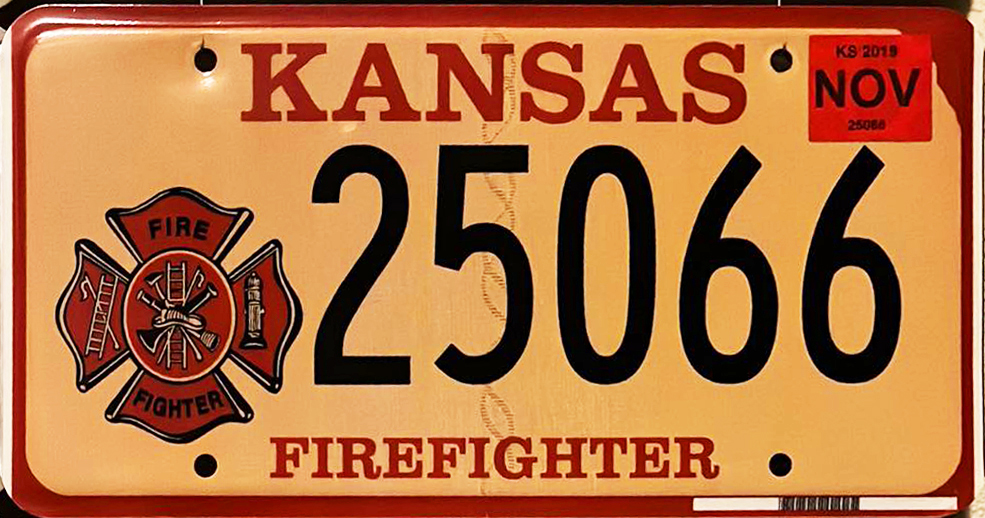
Kansas residents who are veterans, work as a first responder, and people who work in agriculture may request a custom plate reflecting their profession.

For automobiles, Kansas first required its residents to register their vehicles and display license plates in 1913. Plates are currently issued by the Kansas Department of Revenue through its Division of Vehicles and only rear plates have been required since 1956. Kansas is one of only 19 U.S. states that don't require front license plates.

=== Highways ===
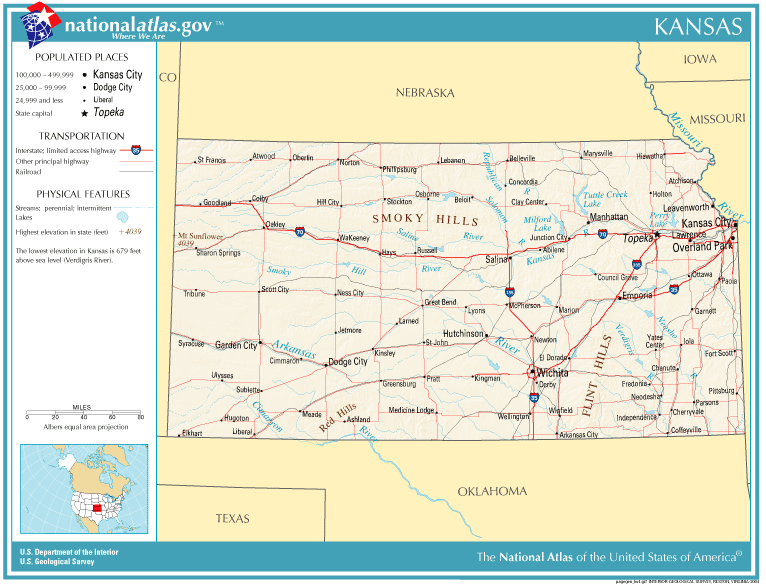
Kansas highway map

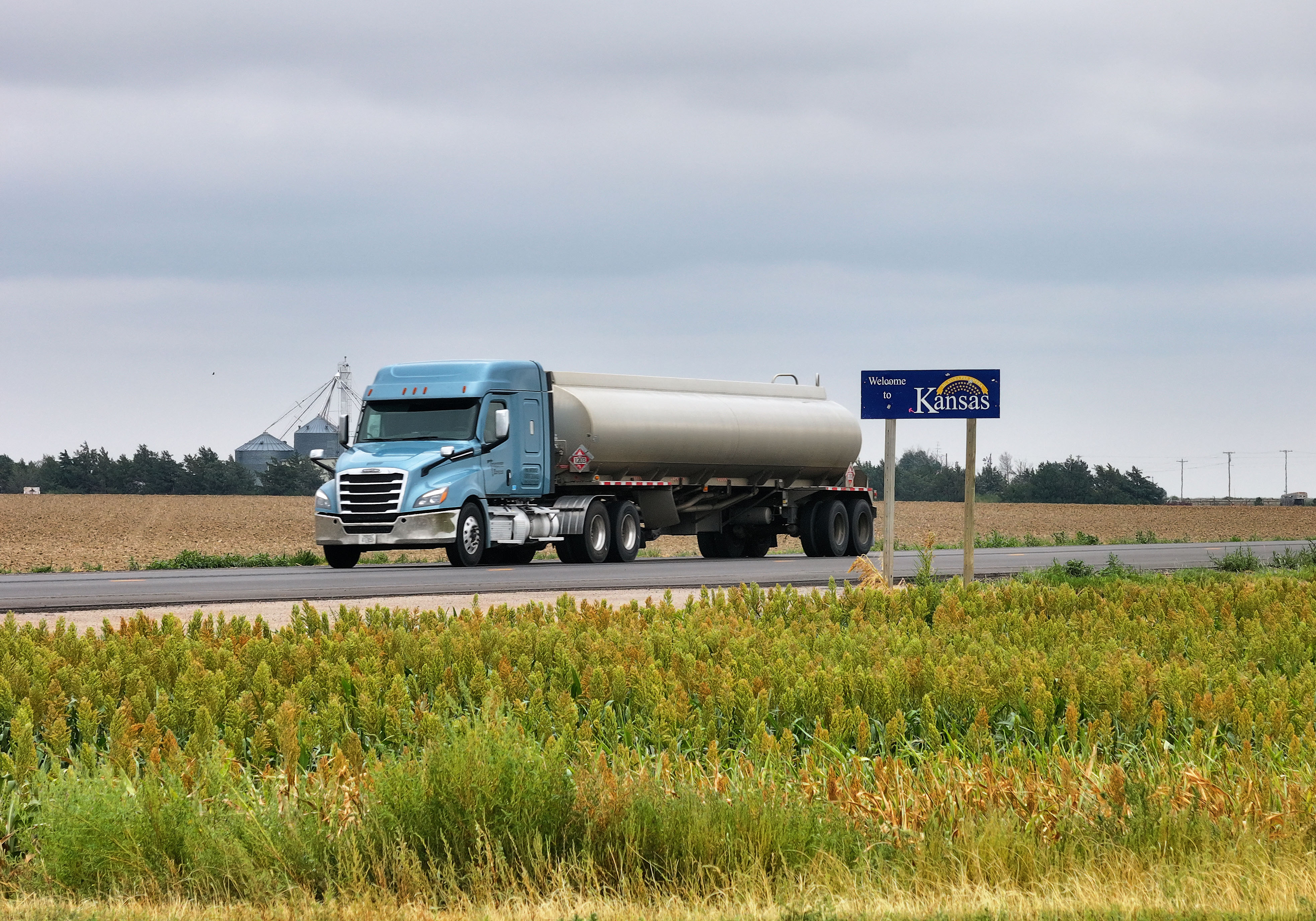
Kansas welcome sign on K-96

Kansas is served by two Interstate highways with one beltway, two spur routes, and three bypasses, with over 874 miles (1,407 km) in all. The first section of Interstate in the nation was opened on Interstate 70 (I-70) just west of Topeka on November 14, 1956.

I-70 is a major east–west route connecting to Denver, Colorado and Kansas City, Missouri. Cities along this route (from west to east) include Colby, Hays, Salina, Junction City, Topeka, Lawrence, Bonner Springs, and Kansas City.

I-35 is a major north–south route connecting to Oklahoma City, Oklahoma and Des Moines, Iowa. Cities along this route (from south to north) include Wichita, El Dorado, Emporia, Ottawa, and Kansas City (and suburbs).

Spur routes serve as connections between the two major routes. I-135, a north–south route, connects I-35 at Wichita to I-70 at Salina. I-335, a southwest–northeast route, connects I-35 at Emporia to I-70 at Topeka. I-335 and portions of I-35 and I-70 make up the Kansas Turnpike. Bypasses include I-470 around Topeka, I-235 around Wichita, and I-670 in downtown Kansas City. I-435 is a beltway around the Kansas City metropolitan area while I-635 bypasses through Kansas City.

U.S. Route 69 (US-69) travels south to north, from Oklahoma to Missouri. The highway passes through the eastern section of Kansas, traveling through Baxter Springs, Pittsburg, Frontenac, Fort Scott, Louisburg, and the Kansas City area.

Kansas also has the country's third largest state highway system after Texas and California. This is because of the high number of counties and county seats (105) and their intertwining.

In January 2004, the Kansas Department of Transportation (KDOT) announced the new Kansas 511 traveler information service. By dialing 511, callers will get access to information about road conditions, construction, closures, detours and weather conditions for the state highway system. Weather and road condition information is updated every 15 minutes.

==== Interstate Highways ====
- I-35
  - I-135 (formerly known as I-35W)
  - I-235
  - I-335
  - I-435
  - I-635
- I-70
  - I-470
  - I-670

==== U.S. Routes ====
- US-24
- US-36
- US-40
- US-50
- US-54
- US-56
- US-59
  - US-159
- US-160
- US-166
- US-69
  - US-169
- US-270
- US-73
- US-75
- US-77
  - US-177
- US-81
  - US-281
- US-83
  - US-183
  - US-283
- US-400

=== Aviation ===
The state's only major commercial (Class C) airport is Wichita Dwight D. Eisenhower National Airport, located along US-54 on the western edge of the city. Manhattan Regional Airport in Manhattan offers daily flights to Dallas/Fort Worth International Airport and Chicago's O'Hare International Airport, making it the second-largest commercial airport in the state. Most air travelers in northeastern Kansas fly out of Kansas City International Airport, located in Platte County, Missouri, as well as Topeka Regional Airport in the state's capital.

In the state's southeastern part, people often use Tulsa International Airport in Tulsa, Oklahoma or Joplin Regional Airport in Joplin, Missouri. For those in the far western part of the state, Denver International Airport is a popular option. Connecting flights are also available from smaller Kansas airports in Dodge City, Garden City, Hays, Hutchinson, Liberal, or Salina.

Dotted across the state are smaller regional and municipal airports, including the Lawrence Municipal Airport, which houses many aircraft for the city of Lawrence and the University of Kansas, Miami County Airport, Wamego Airport, Osage City Municipal Airport, which is the headquarters of Skydive Kansas, Garden City Regional Airport, Manhattan Regional Airport, and Dodge City Regional Airport.

=== Rail ===
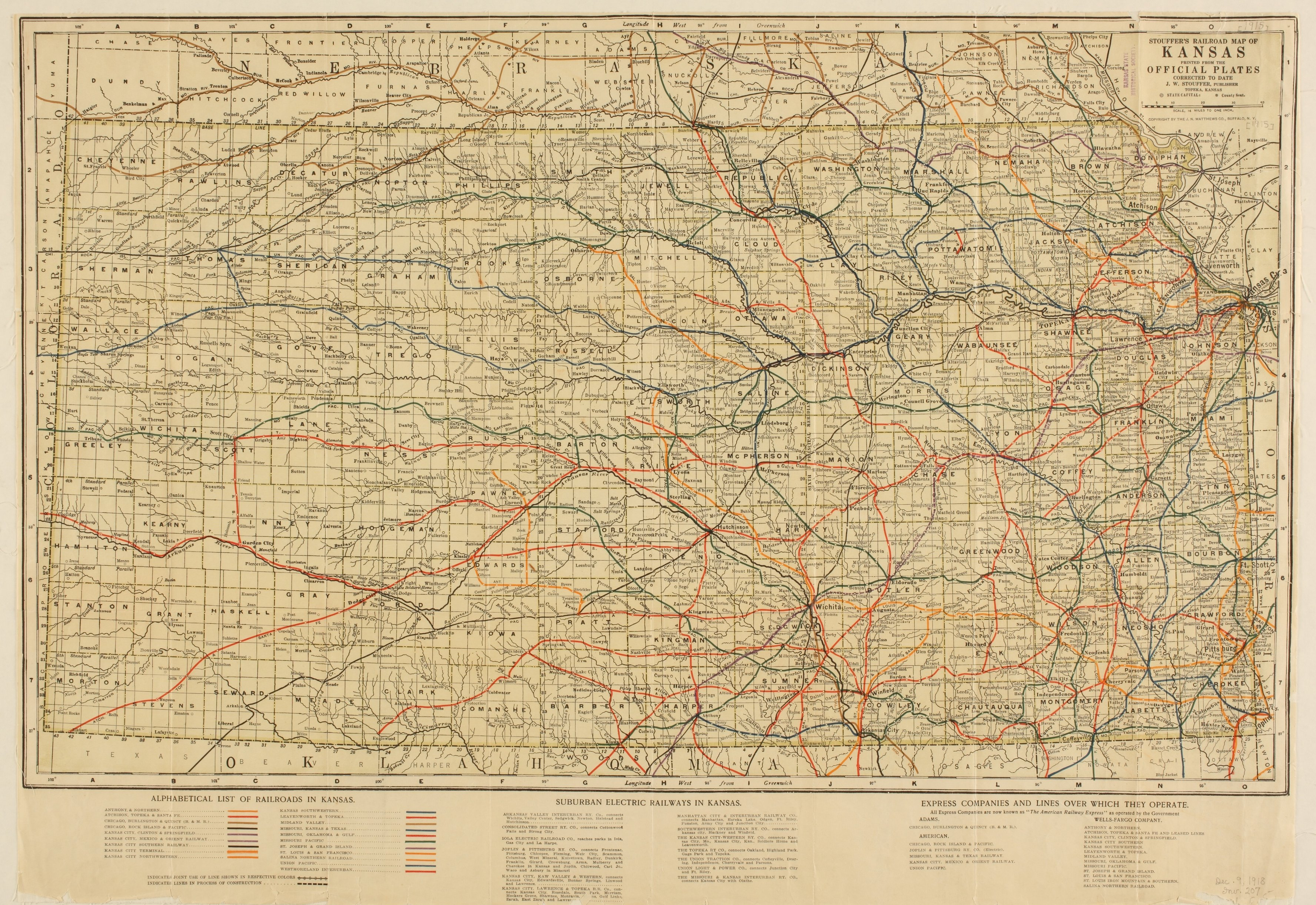
1915–1918 Kansas railroad map

Up through the mid-20th century, railroads connected most cities in Kansas. During World War II, less profitable links were abandoned for scrap metal drives, then additional mileage was reduced as passenger service was halted caused by the wide spread use of automobiles and trucking on the expanding highway system.

For passenger service, currently the Southwest Chief Amtrak route runs through the state on its route from Chicago, Illinois to Los Angeles, California on the BNSF railway. Stops in Kansas include Lawrence, Topeka, Newton, Hutchinson, Dodge City, and Garden City. An Amtrak Thruway connects Newton to the Heartland Flyer in Oklahoma City, Oklahoma. There has been proposals to modify the Amtrak routing through Kansas, such as: removing rail service from the Southwest Chief between Albuquerque, New Mexico and Dodge City, and extending rail service for the Heartland Flyer from Oklahoma City to Newton with new stops at Arkansas City and Wichita.

For freight service, there are three Class I railroads in Kansas: BNSF, Union Pacific, and CPKC; as well as many shortline railroads.

=== Transit ===
Local transit map
Local Transit Systems (Only systems with fixed-route services are shown)

== Law and government ==
=== State and local politics ===
The executive branch consists of one officer and five elected officers. The governor and lieutenant governor are elected on the same ticket. The attorney general, secretary of state, state treasurer, and state insurance commissioner are each elected separately.

The bicameral Kansas Legislature consists of the Kansas House of Representatives, with 125 members serving two-year terms, and the Kansas Senate, with 40 members serving four-year terms.

The judicial branch of the state government is headed by the Kansas Supreme Court. The court has seven judges. A vacancy is filled by the Governor picking one of three nominees selected by the nine-member Kansas Supreme Court Nominating Commission. The board consists of five Kansas lawyers elected by other Kansas lawyers and four members selected by the governor.

=== Political culture ===
Since the 1930s, Kansas has remained one of the most socially conservative states in the nation. The 1990s brought the defeat of prominent Democrats, including Dan Glickman, and the Kansas State Board of Education's 1999 decision to eliminate evolution from the state teaching standards, a decision that was later reversed. In 2005, voters accepted a constitutional amendment to ban same-sex marriage. The next year, the state passed a law setting a minimum age for marriage at 15 years. Kansas's path to a solid Republican state has been examined by journalist and historian Thomas Frank in his 2004 book What's the Matter with Kansas?.

=== 19th-century state politics ===
Starting in 1887 Kansas women could vote in city elections and hold certain offices.

=== 20th-century state politics ===
Kansas was the first state to institute a system of workers' compensation (1910) and to regulate the securities industry (1911). Kansas also permitted women's suffrage in 1912, almost a decade before the federal constitution was amended to require it. Suffrage in all states would not be guaranteed until ratification of the 19th Amendment to the U.S. Constitution in 1920.

The council–manager government model was adopted by many larger Kansas cities in the years following World War I while many American cities were being run by political machines or organized crime, notably the Pendergast Machine in neighboring Kansas City, Missouri. Kansas was also at the center of Brown v. Board of Education of Topeka, a 1954 Supreme Court decision that banned racially segregated schools throughout the U.S.; many Kansas residents opposed the decision, and it led to protests in Topeka after the verdict.

The state backed Republican Presidential Candidates Wendell Willkie and Thomas E. Dewey in 1940 and 1944, respectively, breaking ranks with the majority of the country in the election of Franklin D. Roosevelt. Kansas also supported Dewey in 1948 despite the presence of incumbent president Harry S. Truman, who hailed from Independence, Missouri, approximately 15 miles (24 km) east of the Kansas–Missouri state line. After Roosevelt carried Kansas in 1936, only one Democrat has won the state since, Lyndon B. Johnson in 1964.

=== 21st-century state politics ===
Voter registration as of June 2025
Party	Number of voters	Percentage
Republican	900,078	45.08%
Unaffiliated	567,753	28.43%
Democratic	499,110	24.99%
Libertarian	23,800	1.19%
No Labels Kansas	5,136	0.26%
United Kansas	805	0.04%
Total	1,996,682	100.00%

In 2008, Democrat Governor Kathleen Sebelius vetoed permits for the construction of new coal-fired energy plants in Kansas, saying: "We know that greenhouse gases contribute to climate change. As an agricultural state, Kansas is particularly vulnerable. Therefore, reducing pollutants benefits our state not only in the short term—but also for generations of Kansans to come." However, shortly after Mark Parkinson became governor in 2009 upon Sebelius's resignation to become Secretary of U.S. Department of Health & Human Services, Parkinson announced a compromise plan to allow construction of a coal-fired plant.

In 2010, Republican Sam Brownback was elected governor with 63 percent of the state vote. He was sworn in as governor in 2011, Kansas's first Republican governor in eight years. Brownback had established himself as a conservative member of the U.S. Senate in years prior, but made several controversial decisions after becoming governor, leading to a 23% approval rating among registered voters – the lowest of any governor in the United States. In May 2011, much to the opposition of art leaders and enthusiasts in the state, Brownback eliminated the Kansas Arts Commission, making Kansas the first state without an arts agency. In July 2011, Brownback announced plans to close the Lawrence branch of the Kansas Department of Social and Rehabilitation Services as a cost-saving measure. Hundreds rallied against the decision. Lawrence City Commission later voted to provide the funding needed to keep the branch open.

Democrat Laura Kelly defeated former Secretary of State of Kansas Kris Kobach in the 2018 election for Governor with 48.0% of the vote.

In August 2022, Kansas voters rejected the controversial Value Them Both Amendment, which would have eliminated the right to an abortion in the state constitution. The vote was the first referendum on abortion since Roe v. Wade was overturned earlier that summer, and the result was hailed as a landmark victory for pro-choice advocates in the traditionally socially conservative state.

In a 2020 study, Kansas was ranked as the 13th hardest state for citizens to vote in.

=== National politics ===
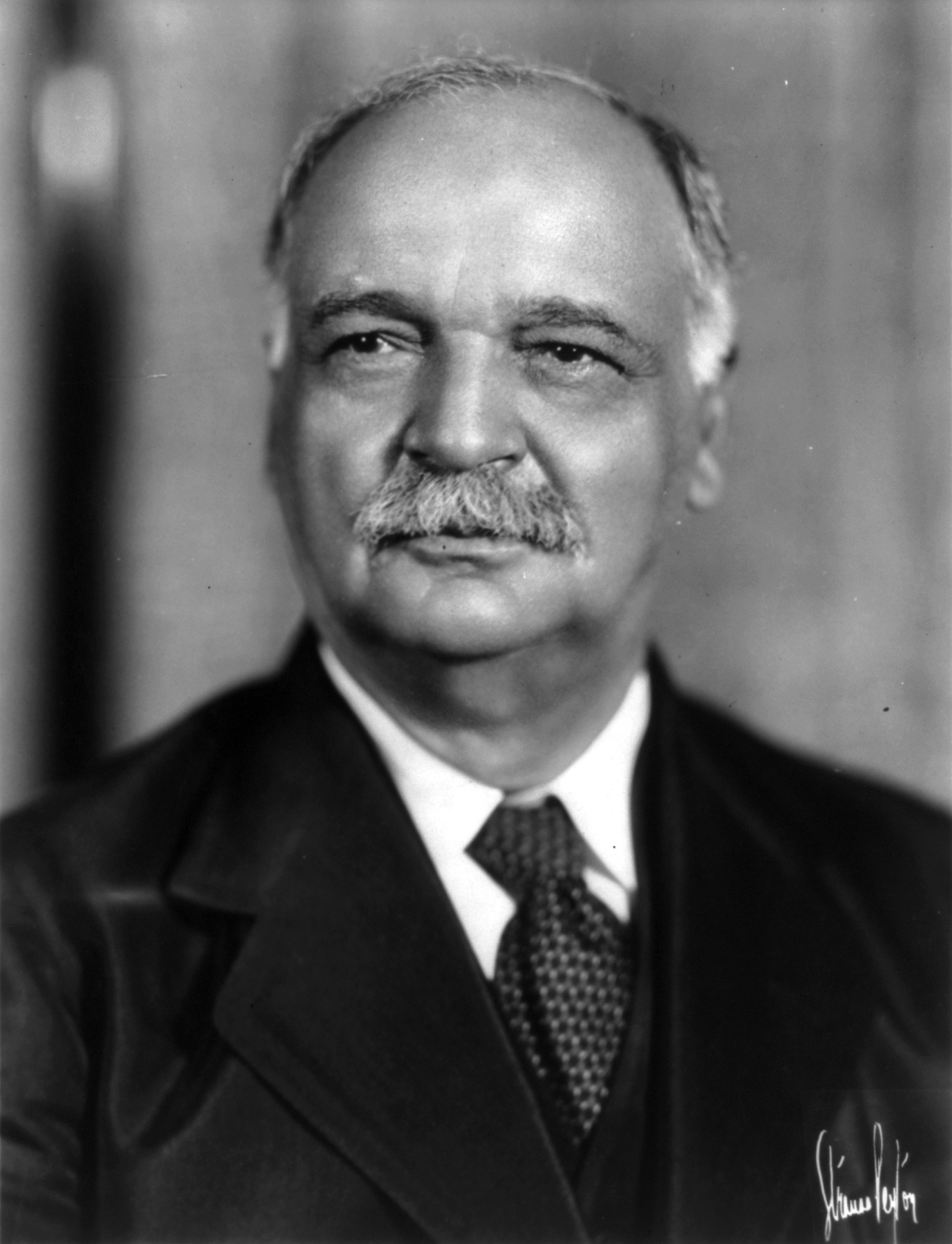
Charles Curtis (R) was born near Topeka and served as a State Legislator, Congressman and Senator, before becoming Vice President (1929–33). He is the only Native American elected to the Executive Branch (he was born into the Kaw Nation).

The state's current delegation to the Congress of the United States includes Republican Senators Jerry Moran of Manhattan, and Roger Marshall of Great Bend. In the House of Representatives, Kansas is represented by Republican Representatives Tracey Mann of Quinter (District 1), Jake LaTurner of Pittsburg (District 2), Ron Estes of Wichita (District 4), and Democratic Representative Sharice Davids of Kansas City (District 3) Davids is the second Native American to represent Kansas in Congress, after Republican Charles Curtis (Kaw).

Historically, Kansas has been strongly Republican, dating from the Antebellum age when the Republican Party was created out of the movement opposing the extension of slavery into Kansas Territory. Prior to 2026, Kansas had not elected a Democrat to the U.S. Senate since the 1932 election, when Franklin D. Roosevelt won his first term as president in the wake of the Great Depression. This was the longest Senate losing streak for either party in a single state.

The only non-Republican presidential candidates Kansas has given its electoral vote to are Populist James Weaver and Democrats William Jennings Bryan (once), Woodrow Wilson, Franklin Roosevelt (twice), and Lyndon Johnson. In 2004, George W. Bush won the state's six electoral votes by an overwhelming margin of 25 percentage points with 62% of the vote. The only two counties to support Democrat John Kerry in that election were Wyandotte, which contains Kansas City, and Douglas, home to the University of Kansas, located in Lawrence. The 2008 election brought similar results as John McCain won the state with 57% of the votes. Douglas, Wyandotte, and Crawford County were the only counties in support of President Barack Obama.

Abilene was the boyhood home to Republican president Dwight D. Eisenhower, and he maintained lifelong ties to family and friends there. Kansas was the adult home of two losing Republican candidates (Governor Alf Landon in 1936 and Senator Bob Dole in 1996).

=== State laws ===
The legal drinking age in Kansas is 21. In lieu of the state retail sales tax, a 10% Liquor Drink Tax is collected for liquor consumed on the licensed premises and an 8% Liquor Enforcement Tax is collected on retail purchases. Although the sale of cereal malt beverage (also known as 3.2 beer) was legalized in 1937, the first post-Prohibition legalization of alcoholic liquor did not occur until the state's constitution was amended in 1948. The following year the Legislature enacted the Liquor Control Act which created a system of regulating, licensing, and taxing, and the Division of Alcoholic Beverage Control (ABC) was created to enforce the act. The power to regulate cereal malt beverage remains with the cities and counties. Liquor-by-the-drink did not become legal until passage of an amendment to the state's constitution in 1986 and additional legislation the following year. As of November 2006, Kansas still has 29 dry counties and only 17 counties have passed liquor-by-the-drink with no food sales requirement. Today there are more than 2,600 liquor and 4,000 cereal malt beverage licensees in the state.

On May 12, 2022, Gov. Laura Kelly signed legislation (Senate Bill 84) that legalizes sports betting in the state, making Kansas the 35th state to approve sports wagering in the US. This would give the four state-owned casinos the right to partner with online bookmakers and up to 50 retailers, including gas stations and restaurants, to engage in sports betting.

== Education ==
Map of colleges and universities in Kansas offering four-year degrees:
– Public universities
– Municipal universities
– Federal universities
– Private universities

Education in Kansas is governed at the primary and secondary school level by the Kansas State Board of Education. The state's public colleges and universities are supervised by the Kansas Board of Regents.

Twice since 1999 the Board of Education has approved changes in the state science curriculum standards that encouraged the teaching of intelligent design. Both times, the standards were reversed after changes in the composition of the board in the next election.

== Culture ==
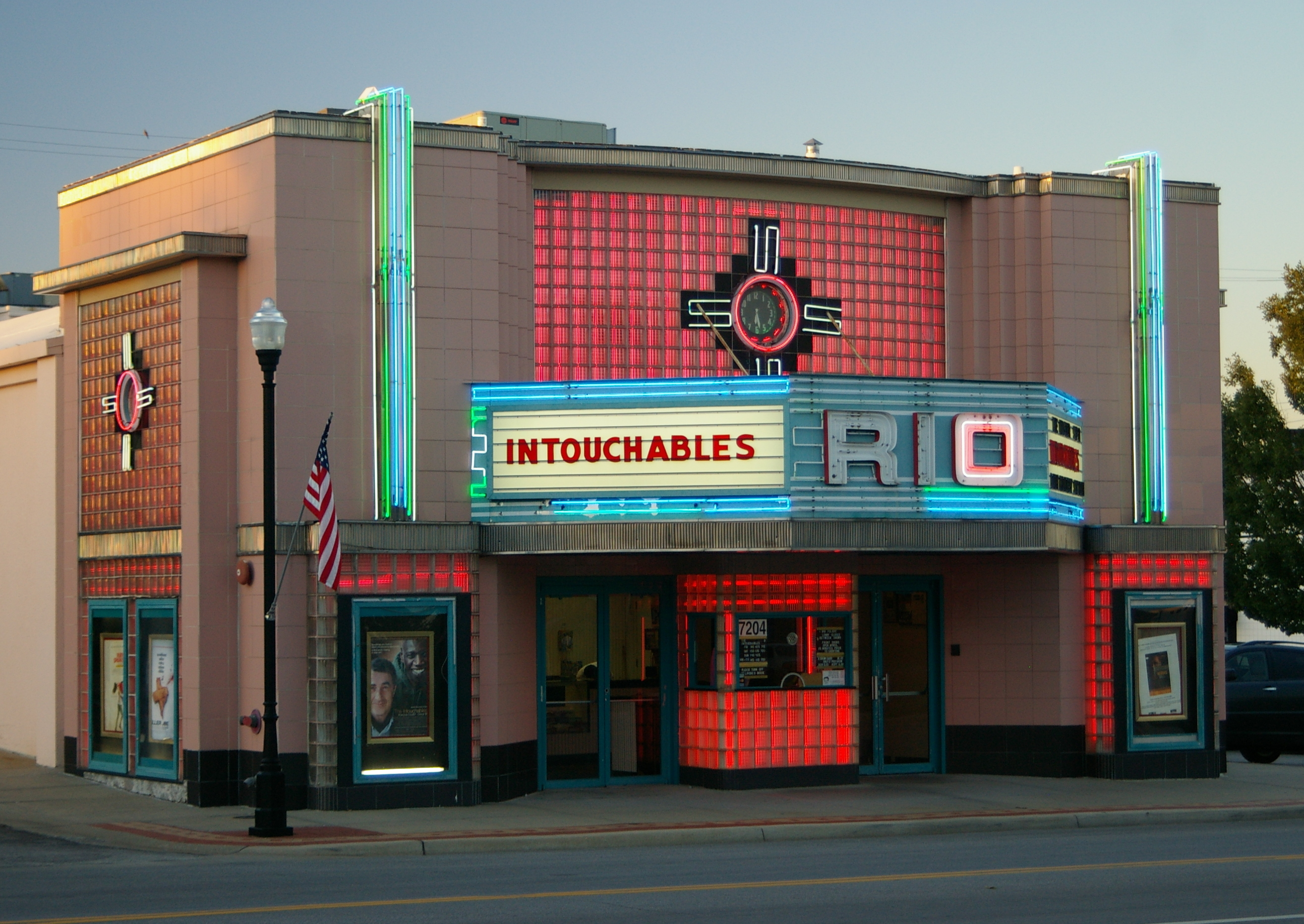
The Rio Theatre, Overland Park

=== Music ===
The rock band Kansas was formed in the state capital of Topeka, the hometown of several of the band's members.

Joe Walsh, guitarist for the famous rock band the Eagles, was born in Wichita. Danny Carey, drummer for the band Tool, was raised in Paola.

Singers from Kansas include Leavenworth native Melissa Etheridge, Sharon native Martina McBride, Chanute native Jennifer Knapp (whose first album was titled Kansas), Kansas City native Janelle Monáe, Prairie Village native Joyce DiDonato, and Liberal native Jerrod Niemann.

The state anthem is the American classic Home on the Range, written by Kansan Brewster Higley. Another song, the official state march adopted by the Kansas Legislature in 1935 is called The Kansas March, which features the lyrics, "Blue sky above us, silken strands of heat, Rim of the far horizon, where earth and heaven meet, Kansas as a temple, stands in velvet sod, Shrine which the sunshine, sanctifies to God."

=== Literature ===
The state's most famous appearance in literature was as the home of Dorothy Gale, the main character in the novel The Wonderful Wizard of Oz (1900). Laura Ingalls Wilder's Little House on the Prairie, published in 1935, is another well-known tale about Kansas.

Kansas was also the setting of the 1965 best-seller In Cold Blood, described by its author Truman Capote as a "nonfiction novel". Mixing fact and fiction, the book chronicles the events and aftermath of the 1959 murder of a wealthy farmer and his family who lived in the small West Kansas town of Holcomb in Finney County.

The fictional town of Smallville, Kansas is the childhood home of Clark Kent/Superman in American comic books published by DC Comics. Also Keystone City is a Kansas city where The Flash works and lives.

The science fiction novella A Boy and His Dog, as well as the film based on it, take place in post-apocalyptic Topeka.

The winner of the 2011 Newbery Medal for excellence in children's literature, Moon Over Manifest, tells the story of a young and adventurous girl named Abilene who is sent to the fictional town of Manifest, Kansas, by her father in the summer of 1936. It was written by Kansan Clare Vanderpool.

Lawrence is the setting for a number of science fiction writer James Gunn's novels.

=== Art ===
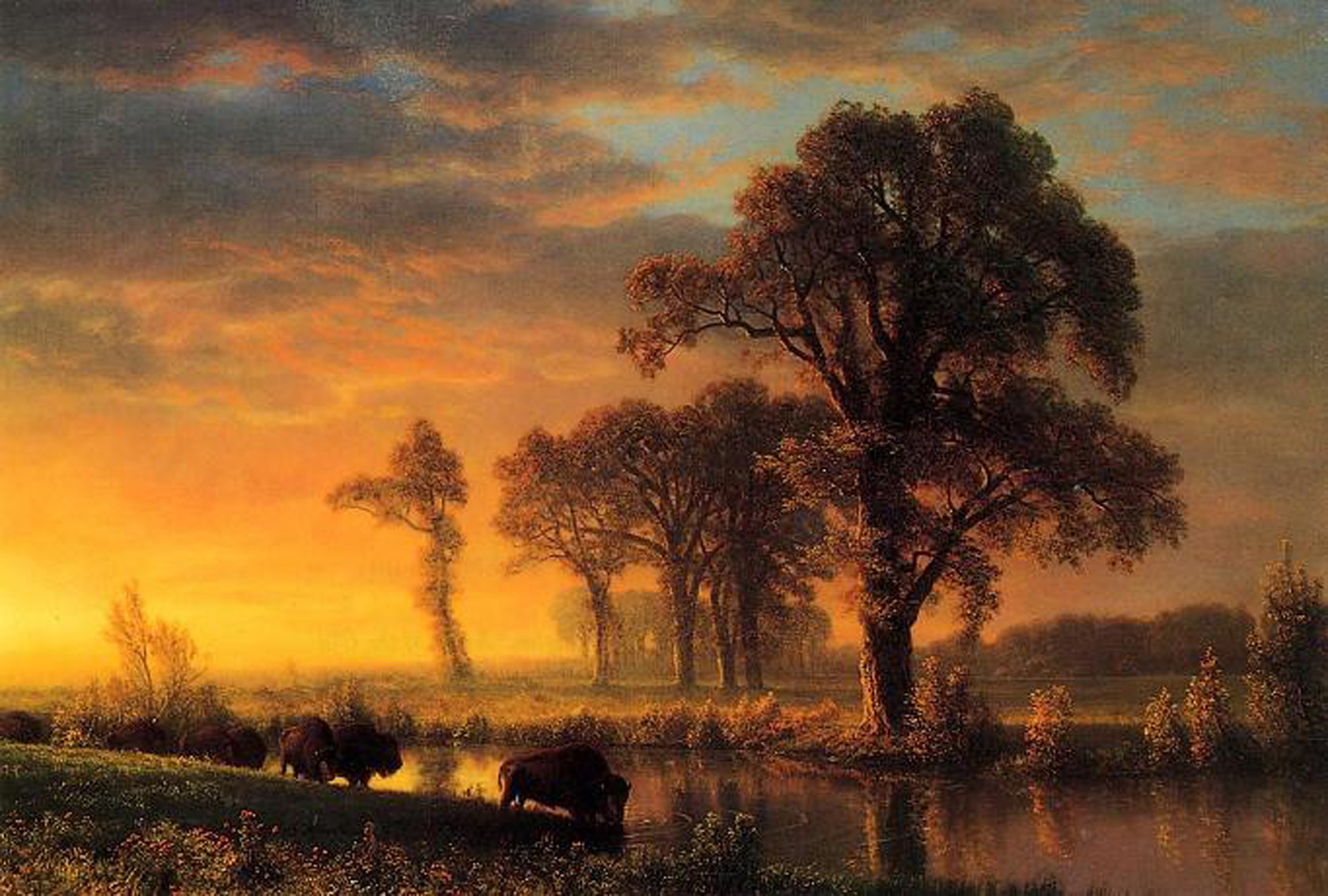
Albert Bierstadt, Western Kansas, 1875

Kansas is home to a number of art museums. The Wichita Art Museum collection focuses on American art. The Nerman Museum of Contemporary Art in Overland Park exhibits artists of national and international recognition. The Spencer Museum of Art, at University of Kansas in Lawrence, has a diverse permanent collection and Ingrid & J.K. Lee Study Center as an education space.

=== Film theaters ===
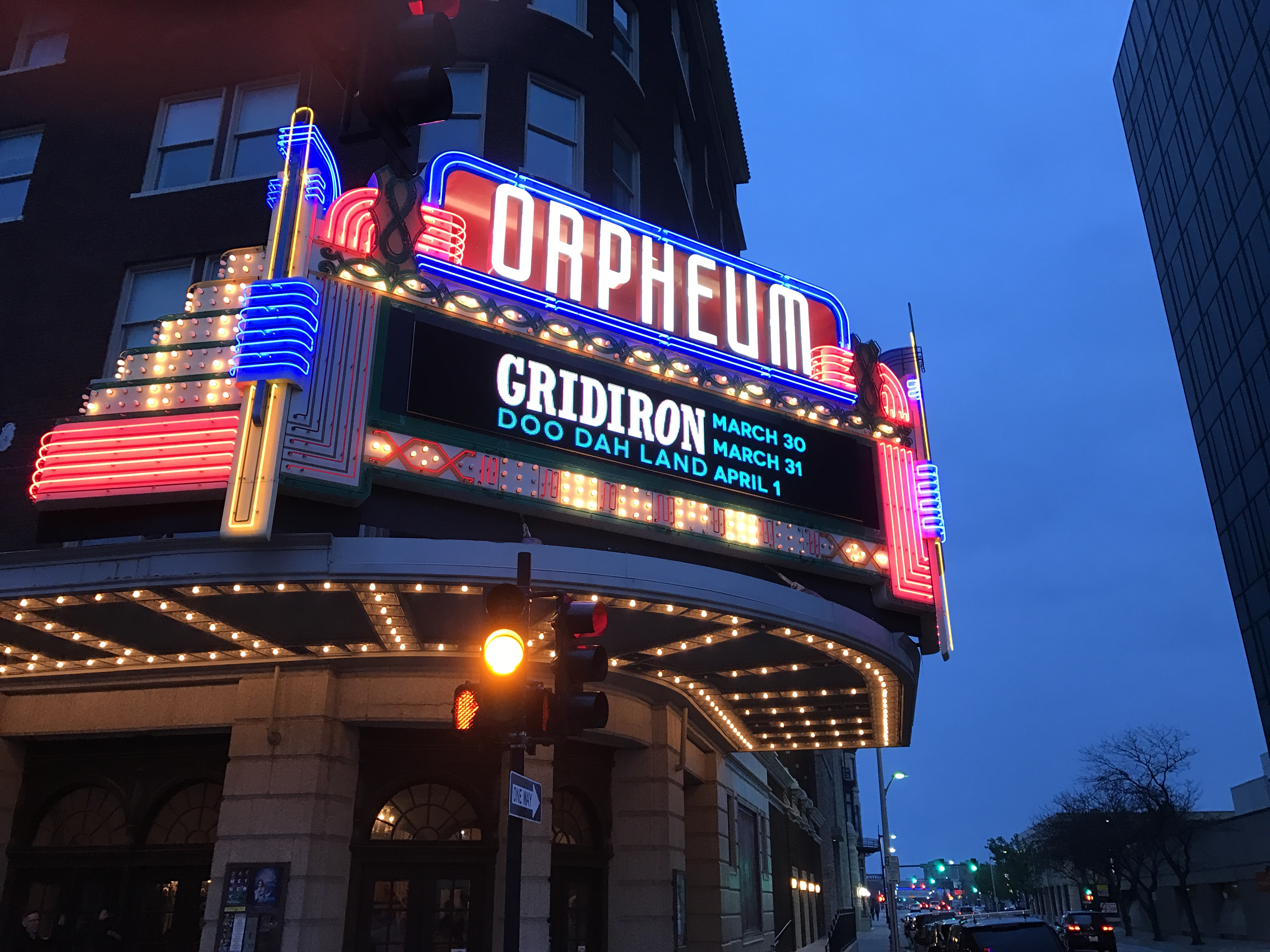
The Orpheum, a historic movie theater in Wichita

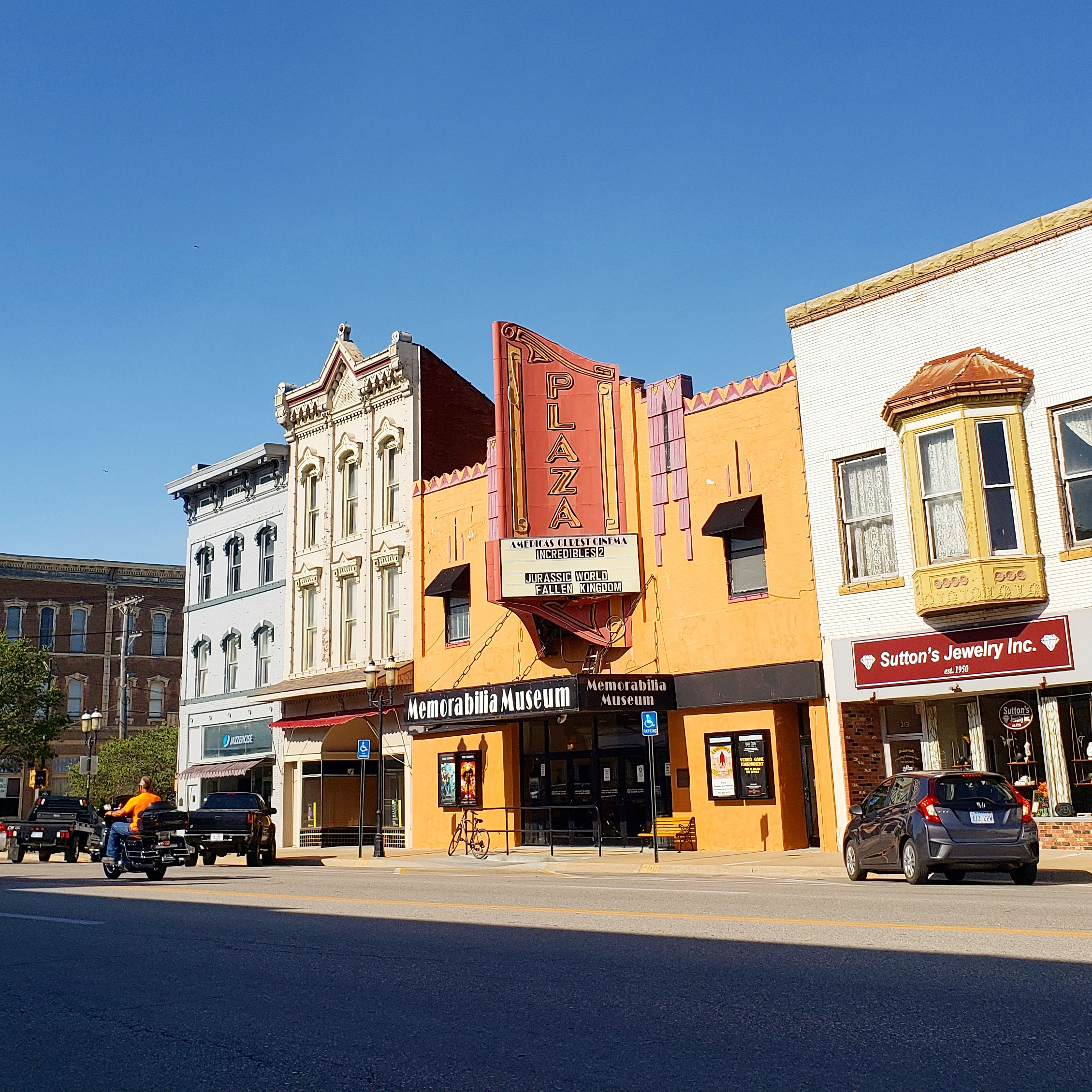
The Plaza Cinema in Ottawa is the oldest operating movie theater in the world.

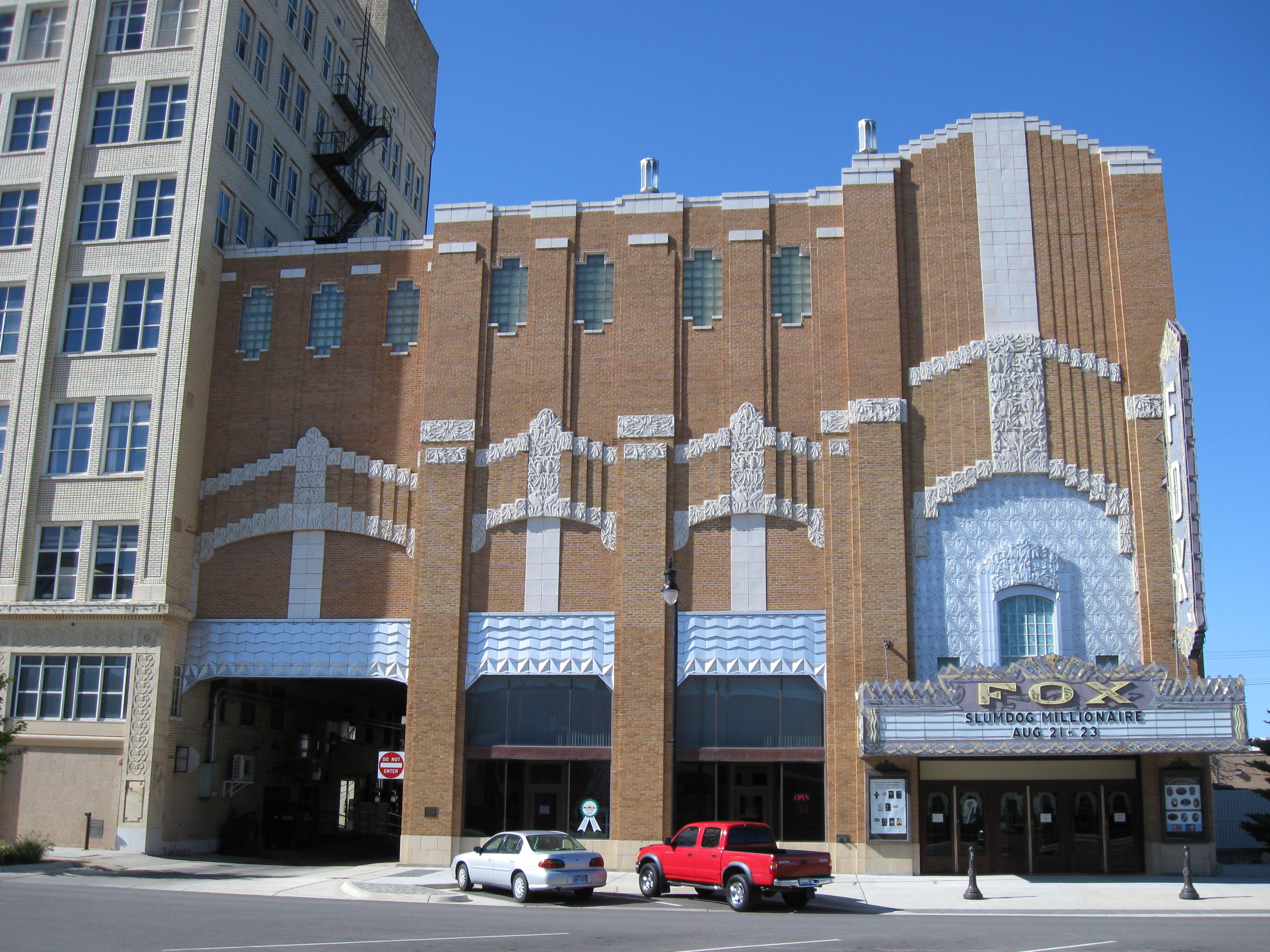
Fox Theater, Hutchinson

The first film theater in Kansas was the Patee Theater in Lawrence. Most theaters at the time showed films only as part of vaudeville acts but not as an exclusive and stand alone form of entertainment. Though the Patee family had been involved in vaudeville, they believed films could carry the evening without other variety acts, but to show the films it was necessary for the Patee's to establish a generating plant (back in 1903 Lawrence was not yet fully electrified). The Patee Theater was one of the first of its kind west of the Mississippi River. The specialized equipment like the projector came from New York City.

Kansas has been the setting of many award-winning and popular American films, as well as being the home of some of the oldest operating cinemas in the world. The Plaza Cinema in Ottawa, Kansas, located in the northeastern portion of the state, was built on May 22, 1907, and it is listed by the Guinness Book of World Records as the oldest operating cinema in the world. In 1926, The Jayhawk Theatre, an art-deco movie house in Topeka opened its doors for the first time to movie going audiences, and today, in addition to screenings of independent films, the theatre acts as a venue for plays and concerts. The Fox Theater in Hutchinson was built in 1930, and was placed on the National Register of Historic Places in 1989. Like the other theaters listed here, The Fox still plays first run movies to this day.

=== Popular culture ===
==== Film ====
- As was the case with the novel, Dorothy Gale (portrayed by Judy Garland) in the 1939 fantasy film The Wizard of Oz was a young girl who lived in Kansas with her aunt and uncle. The line, "We're not in Kansas anymore", has entered into the English lexicon as a phrase describing a wholly new or unexpected situation.
- The 1967 feature film In Cold Blood, like the book on which it was based, was set in various locations across Kansas. Many of the scenes in the film were filmed at the exact locations where the events profiled in the book took place. A 1996 TV miniseries was also based on the book.
- The 1988 film Kansas starred Andrew McCarthy as a traveler who met up with a dangerous wanted drifter played by Matt Dillon.
- The 2005 film Capote, for which Philip Seymour Hoffman was awarded the Academy Award for Best Actor for his portrayal of the title character, profiled the author as he traveled across Kansas while writing In Cold Blood (although most of the film itself was shot in the Canadian province of Manitoba).
- The setting of The Day After, a 1983 made-for-television movie about a fictional nuclear attack, was the city of Lawrence.
- Due to the super hero Superman growing up in the fictional Smallville, Kansas, multiple films featuring the super hero have been entirely or at least partially set in Kansas including Superman (1978), Superman III (1983), Man of Steel (2013), Batman v Superman: Dawn of Justice (2016), and Justice League (2017).
- The 2012 film Looper is set in Kansas.
- The 1973 film Paper Moon in which Tatum O'Neal won an Academy Award for Best Supporting Actress (The youngest to win an Academy Award) was based in and filmed in Kansas. The film was shot in the small towns of Hays; McCracken; Wilson; and St. Joseph, Missouri. Various shooting locations include the Midland Hotel at Wilson; the railway depot at Gorham; storefronts and buildings on Main Street in White Cloud; Hays; sites on both sides of the Missouri River; Rulo Bridge; and Saint Joseph, Missouri.
- Scenes of the 1996 film Mars Attacks! took place in the fictional town of Perkinsville. Scenes taking place in Kansas were filmed in Burns, Lawrence, and Wichita.
- The 2007 film The Lookout is set mostly in Kansas (although filmed in Canada). Specifically two locations; Kansas City and the fictional town of Noel, Kansas.
- The 2012 documentary The Gridiron was filmed at The University of Kansas
- The 2014 ESPN documentary No Place Like Home was filmed in Lawrence and the countryside of Douglas County, Kansas
- The 2017 film Thank You for Your Service is primarily set in Kansas, including the cities of Topeka and Junction City.
- The 2017 documentary When Kings Reigned was filmed in Lawrence.
- The 2019 film Brightburn took place in the fictional town of Brightburn. As is evident with scenes in the film depicting mountains (Kansas has no mountain ranges), it was filmed in Georgia instead of in Kansas.

==== Television ====
- The protagonist brothers of the 2005 TV show Supernatural hail from Lawrence, with the city referenced numerous times on the show.
- Most of the second season of the TV series Prison Break had scenes that took place in Kansas. Specifically the towns of Ness City and Tribune as the character T–Bag searches for his ex-girlfriend who turned him in to the police. A season 1 episode also briefly took place in Topeka.
- 2006 TV series Jericho was based in the fictitious town of Jericho, Kansas, surviving post-nuclear America.
- Early seasons of Smallville, about Superman as a teenager, were based in a fictional town of Smallville, Kansas. Unlike most other adaptations of the Superman story, the series also places the fictional city of Metropolis in western Kansas, a few hours from Smallville.
- Gunsmoke, a radio series western, ran from 1952 to 1961, took place in Dodge City, Kansas.
- Gunsmoke, television series, the longest running prime time show of the 20th century, ran from September 10, 1955, to March 31, 1975, for a total of 635 episodes.
- The 2009 Showtime series United States of Tara is set in Overland Park, a suburb of Kansas City.

== Sports ==
=== Professional ===
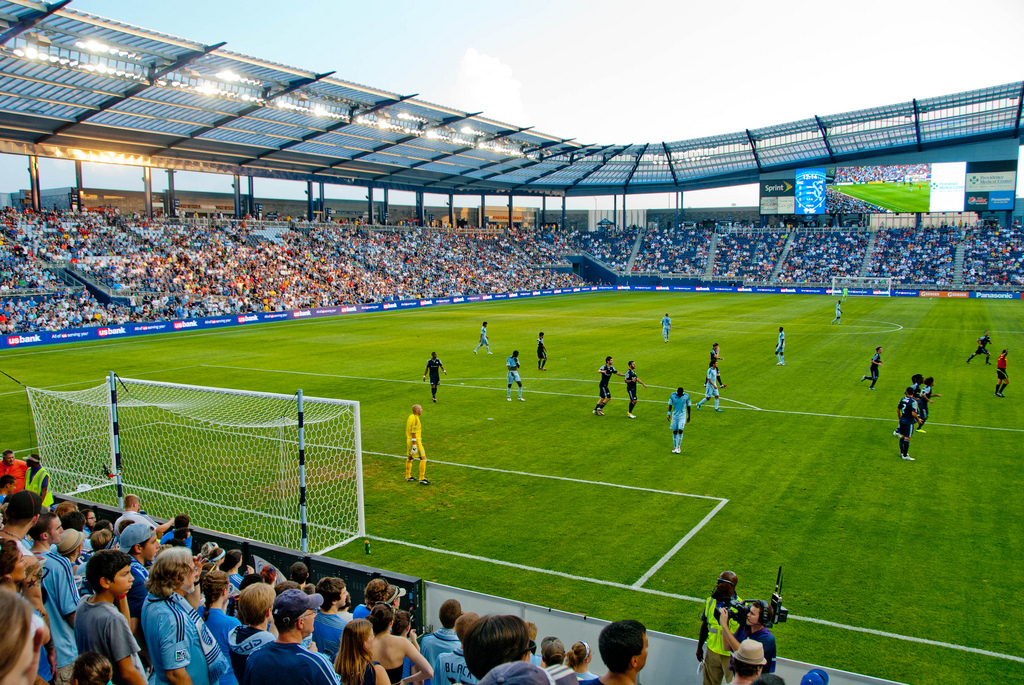
Sporting Park, Kansas City

Team	Sport	League	City
Sporting Kansas City	Soccer	Major League Soccer	Kansas City
Sporting Kansas City II	Soccer	MLS Next Pro	Kansas City
Kansas City Monarchs	Baseball	American Association	Kansas City
Garden City Wind	Baseball	Pecos League	Garden City
Kaw Valley FC	Soccer	USL League Two	Lawrence, and Topeka
Salina Liberty	Indoor football	Champions Indoor Football	Salina
Southwest Kansas Storm	Indoor football	Champions Indoor Football	Dodge City
Wichita Thunder	Ice hockey	ECHL	Wichita
Wichita Turbo Tubs	Baseball	Texas League	Wichita
Wichita Wings	Indoor Soccer	MASL 2	Wichita

Sporting Kansas City, who have played their home games at Village West in Kansas City since 2008, are the second top-tier professional sports league (after the original Wichita Wings of the MISL) and first Major League Soccer team to be located within Kansas. In 2011 the team moved to their new home, a $165 million soccer specific stadium now known as Sporting Park.

Historically, Kansans have supported the major league sports teams of Kansas City, Missouri, including the Kansas City Royals (MLB), and the Kansas City Chiefs (NFL), in part because the home stadiums for these teams are a few miles from the Kansas border. The Chiefs and the Royals play at the Truman Sports Complex, located about 10 miles (16 km) from the Kansas–Missouri state line. FC Kansas City, a charter member of the National Women's Soccer League, played the 2013 season, the first for both the team and the league, on the Kansas side of the metropolitan area, but played on the Missouri side until folding after the 2017 season. From 1973 to 1997 the flagship radio station for the Royals was WIBW in Topeka.

Some Kansans, mostly from the westernmost parts of the state, support the professional sports teams of Denver, particularly the Denver Broncos of the NFL.

Two major auto racing facilities are located in Kansas. The Kansas Speedway located in Kansas City hosts races of the NASCAR, IndyCar, and ARCA circuits. Also, the National Hot Rod Association (NHRA) holds drag racing events at Heartland Park Topeka. The Sports Car Club of America has its national headquarters in Topeka.

==== History ====
The history of professional sports in Kansas probably dates from the establishment of the minor league baseball Topeka Capitals and Leavenworth Soldiers in 1886 in the Western League. The African-American Bud Fowler played on the Topeka team that season, one year before the "color line" descended on professional baseball.

In 1887, the Western League was dominated by a reorganized Topeka team called the Golden Giants: a high-priced collection of major leaguer players, including Bug Holliday, Jim Conway, Dan Stearns, Perry Werden and Jimmy Macullar, which won the league by 15.5 games. On April 10, 1887, the Golden Giants also won an exhibition game from the defending World Series champions, the St. Louis Browns (the present-day Cardinals), by a score of 12–9. However, Topeka was unable to support the team, and it disbanded after one year.

The first night game in the history of professional baseball was played in Independence on April 28, 1930, when the Muscogee (Oklahoma) Indians beat the Independence Producers 13–3 in a minor league game sanctioned by the Western League of the Western Baseball Association with 1,500 fans attending the game. The permanent lighting system was first used for an exhibition game on April 17, 1930, between the Independence Producers and House of David semi-professional baseball team of Benton Harbor, Michigan with the Independence team winning 9–1 before a crowd of 1,700 spectators.

=== College ===
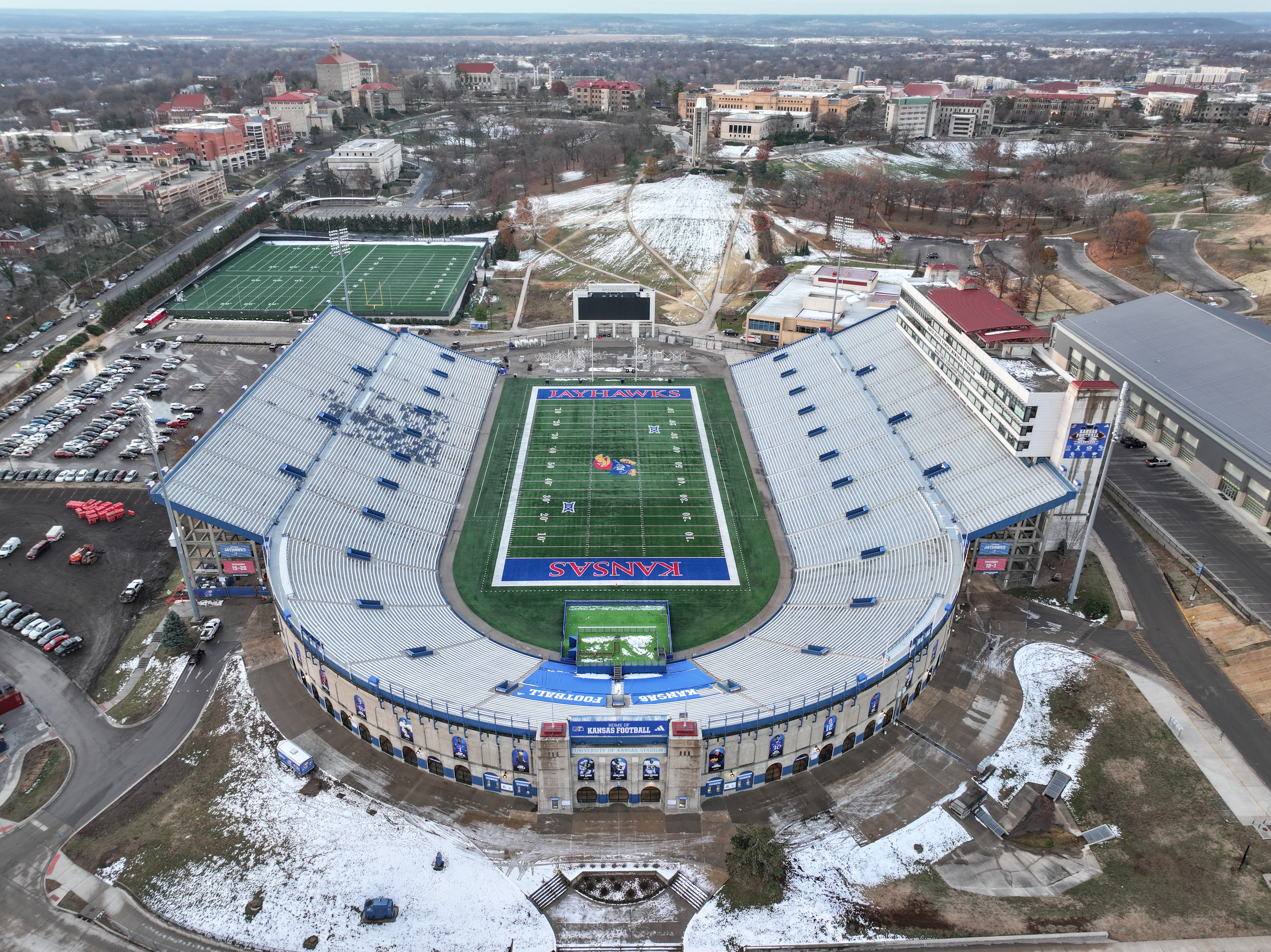
David Booth Kansas Memorial Stadium is the oldest football stadium west of the Mississippi River, and one of the oldest standing football stadiums in the country. Built in 1921, it is home to the Kansas Jayhawks football team.

The history of intercollegiate of athletics in the state dates back to 1866, with the establishment of the University of Kansas baseball team, which competed against local area teams and schools in the Kansas State Fair. The Jayhawks baseball team is one of the oldest intercollegiate baseball programs in the United States.

The governing body for intercollegiate sports in the United States, the National Collegiate Athletic Association (NCAA), was headquartered in Johnson County, Kansas from 1952 until moving to Indianapolis in 1999.

==== NCAA Division I schools ====
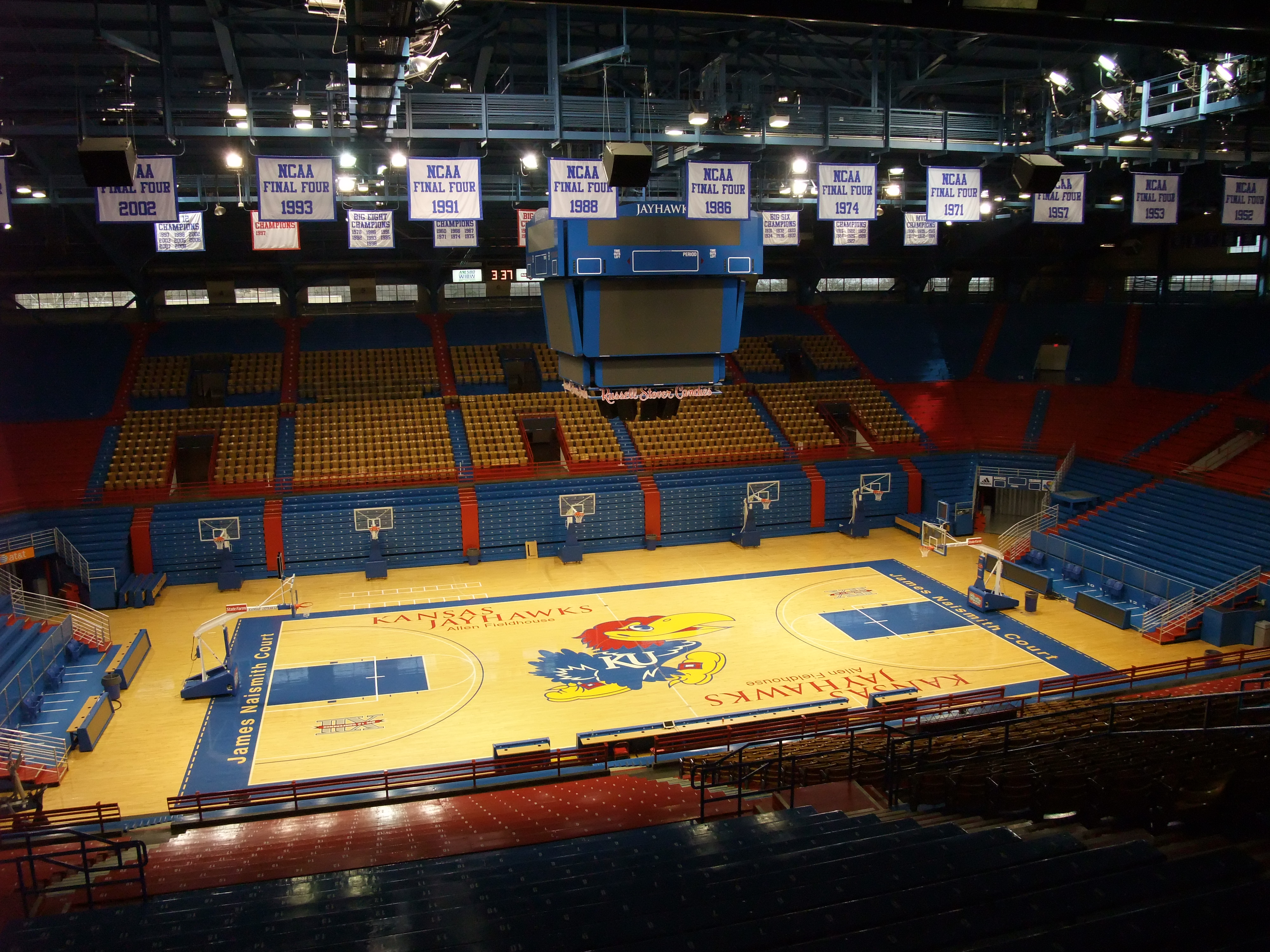
Allen Fieldhouse at University of Kansas in Lawrence

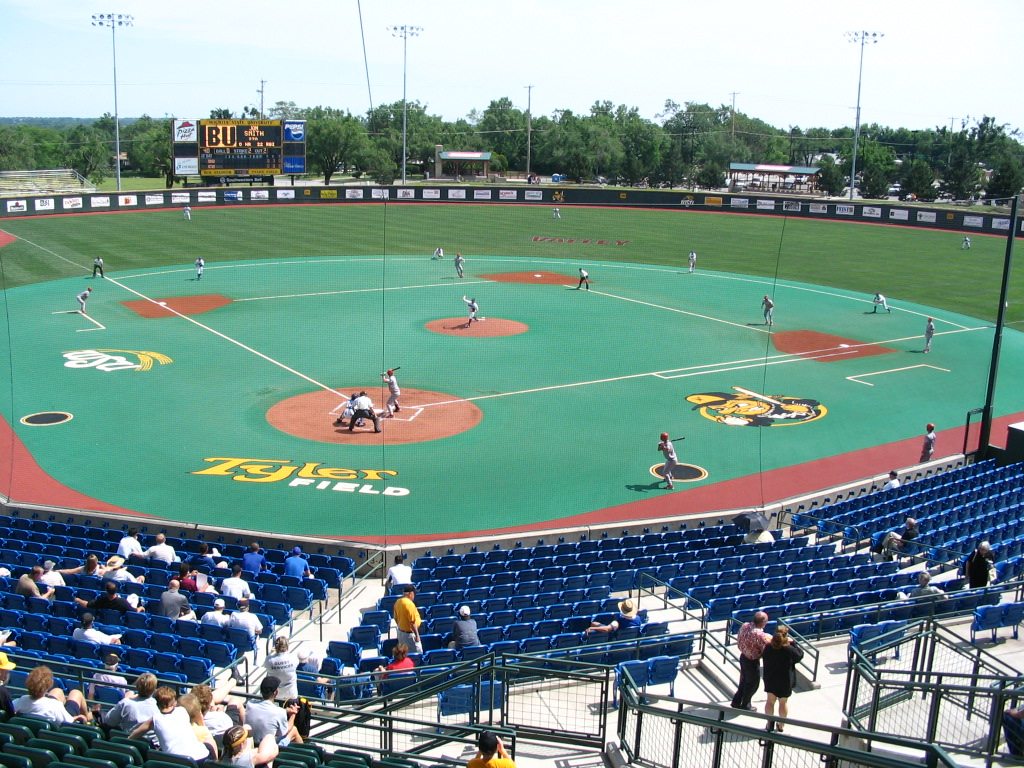
Tyler Field in Eck Stadium at Wichita State University in Wichita

While there are no franchises of the four major professional sports within the state, many Kansans are fans of the state's major college sports teams, especially the Jayhawks of the University of Kansas (KU), and the Wildcats of Kansas State University (KSU or "K-State"). The teams are rivals in the Big 12 Conference.

Both KU and K-State have tradition-rich programs in men's basketball. The Jayhawks are a perennial national power, ranking first in all-time victories among NCAA programs. The Jayhawks have won six national titles, including NCAA tournament championships in 1952, 1988, 2008, and 2022. They also were retroactively awarded national championships by the Helms Foundation for 1922 and 1923. K-State also had a long stretch of success on the hardwood, lasting from the 1940s to the 1980s, making four Final Fours during that stretch. In 1988, KU and K-State met in the Elite Eight, KU taking the game 71–58. After a 12-year absence, the Wildcats returned to the NCAA tournament in 2008, and advanced to the Elite Eight in 2010 and 2018. KU is fifth all-time with 15 Final Four appearances, while K-State's four appearances are tied for 17th.

Conversely, success on the gridiron has been less frequent for both KSU and KU. However, there have been recent breakthroughs for both schools' football teams. The Jayhawks won the Orange Bowl for the first time in three tries in 2008, capping a 12–1 season, the best in school history. And when Bill Snyder arrived to coach at K-State in 1989, he turned the Wildcats from one of the worst college football programs in America, into a national force for most of the 1990s and early 2000s. The team won the Fiesta Bowl in 1997, achieved an undefeated (11–0) regular season and No. 1 ranking in 1998, and took the Big 12 Conference championship in 2003. After three seasons in which K-State football languished, Snyder came out of retirement in 2009 and guided them to the top of the college football ranks again, finishing second in the Big 12 in 2011 and earning a berth in the Cotton Bowl, and winning the Big 12 again in 2012.

Wichita State University, which also fields teams (called the Shockers) in Division I of the NCAA, is best known for its baseball and basketball programs. In baseball, the Shockers won the College World Series in 1989. In men's basketball, they appeared in the Final Four in 1965 and 2013, and entered the 2014 NCAA tournament unbeaten. The school also fielded a football team from 1897 to 1986. The Shocker football team is tragically known for a plane crash in 1970 that killed 31 people, including 14 players.

==== NCAA Division II schools ====
Notable success has also been achieved by the state's smaller schools in football. Pittsburg State University, an NCAA Division II participant, has claimed four national titles in football, two in the NAIA and most recently the 2011 NCAA Division II national title. Pittsburg State became the winningest NCAA Division II football program in 1995. PSU passed Hillsdale College at the top of the all-time victories list in the 1995 season on its march to the national runner-up finish. The Gorillas, in 96 seasons of intercollegiate competition, have accumulated 579 victories, posting a 579–301–48 overall mark.

Washburn University, in Topeka, won the NAIA Men's Basketball Championship in 1987. The Fort Hays State University men won the 1996 NCAA Division II title with a 34–0 record, and the Washburn women won the 2005 NCAA Division II crown. St. Benedict's College (now Benedictine College), in Atchison, won the 1954 and 1967 Men's NAIA Basketball Championships.

The Kansas Collegiate Athletic Conference has its roots as one of the oldest college sport conferences in existence and participates in the NAIA and all ten member schools are in the state of Kansas. Other smaller school conferences that have some members in Kansas are the Mid-America Intercollegiate Athletics Association the Midlands Collegiate Athletic Conference, the Midwest Christian College Conference, and the Heart of America Athletic Conference. Many junior colleges also have active athletic programs.

Emporia State's women's basketball team, under head coach Brandon Schneider, who is now serving as the women's basketball coach at the University of Kansas, has seen success as well. In 2010 the team won the NCAA Division II National Championship. Emporia State and Washburn in Topeka share a heated rivalry in all sports, mostly due to the close proximity of both cities.

==== Junior colleges ====
The Kansas Jayhawk Community College Conference has been heralded as one of the best conferences in all of NJCAA football, with Garden City Community College, Independence Community College, and Butler Community College all consistently in contention for national championships.

=== High school ===
The Kansas State High School Activities Association (KSHSAA) is the organization which oversees interscholastic competition in the state of Kansas at the high school level. It oversees both athletic and non-athletic competition, and sponsors championships in several sports and activities.

=== Rivalry with Missouri ===
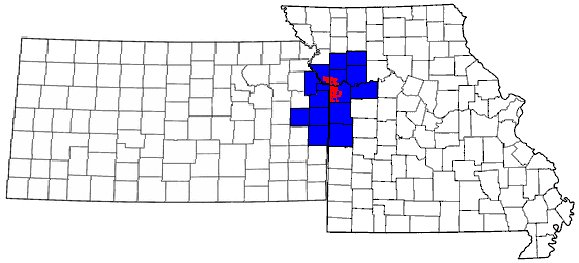
Map of Kansas and Missouri with Kansas City metro counties

Kansas and Missouri are two bordering U.S. states with a long and tumultuous history. The relationship between these two states has its roots in Bleeding Kansas, but mutual distrust has continued off and on since then, even in sporting contexts. These states also share the Kansas City metropolitan area, where both states each have a city named Kansas City on either side of the Missouri River. The bitterness sown during Bleeding Kansas lingers in the Border War between the University of Kansas and the University of Missouri. The two states compete economically, mainly at the border which is also called a Border War. In 2019, the governors of the two states signed an agreement to stop offering financial incentives to pull business across the border. In 2022, the governor of Kansas said that agreement did not include enticement of the Chiefs football team moving its arena from Missouri to Kansas. In 2024, the Kansas House of Representatives and Kansas State Senate passed legislation that would give professional sports programs north of $1 billion in STAR bonds for the development of stadiums and entertainment districts in Kansas City, Kansas. The Chiefs and Royals both hired lobbyists in 2024 that appealed to the Kansas Legislature. As of March 2025, the Chiefs haven't commented directly on a move to Kansas, but the Royals have expressed interest in building a riverfront stadium on the junction between the Kansas River and Missouri River. Kansas House of Representatives member Sean Tarwater said that talks with the Chiefs were intensifying in February 2025, and that Kansas was close to "bringing over at least one team, maybe two". In June 2024, an architecture firm in Kansas released a video featuring 3D renderings of a potential design for a domed stadium in Kansas City, Kansas.

== See also ==
- Index of Kansas-related articles
- Outline of Kansas
- List of Kansas landmarks
- List of people from Kansas
- National Register of Historic Places listings in Kansas
- Osage in Kansas
- USS Kansas, 2 ships

== Bibliography ==
- Mechem, Kirke (1956). The Annals of Kansas: 1911 to 1925. Kansas Historical Society. Archived from the original on February 5, 2021.; 559 pages.
- Mechem, Kirke (1954). The Annals of Kansas: 1886 to 1910. Kansas Historical Society. Archived from the original on February 4, 2021.; 535 pages.
- Wilder, Daniel W. (1886). The Annals of Kansas: 1541 to 1885. Kansas Publishing House. Archived from the original on February 4, 2021.; 1204 pages.
- Connelley, William E., ed. (1918), A Standard History of Kansas and Kansans, Lewis Publishing Company, archived from the original on August 9, 2020; 5 volumes; 2731 pages; (Vol1), (Vol2), (Vol3), (Vol4), (Vol5); the 1919 edition contains additional biographies.
- Connelley, William E. (1916). History of Kansas Newspapers: A History of the Newspapers and Magazines Published in Kansas from 1854 to 1916. Kansas Historical Society. Archived from the original on February 4, 2021.; 369 pages.
- Blackmar, Frank W., ed. (1912), Kansas: A Cyclopedia of State History, Embracing Events, Institutions, Industries, Counties, Cities, Towns, Prominent Persons, Etc, Standard Publishing Co, archived from the original on August 8, 2020; 3 volumes; 2723 pages; (Vol1), (Vol2), (Vol3)
- Everts, Louis H., ed. (1887), Official State Atlas of Kansas, L.H. Everts & Co, archived from the original on January 25, 2019; 610 pages.
- Cutler, William G., ed. (1883). History of the State of Kansas. A.T. Andreas Publisher. Archived from the original on November 9, 2018.; 3 volumes; 1616 pages; (HathiTrust) (Internet Archive)
- Robinson, Sara (1856). Kansas: Its Interior and Exterior Life. Crosby, Nichols and Company.

Preceded by Oregon	List of U.S. states by date of statehood Admitted on January 29, 1861 (34th)	Succeeded by West Virginia
