= National Register of Historic Places listings in Ford County, Kansas =

Location of Ford County in Kansas

This is a list of the National Register of Historic Places listings in Ford County, Kansas.

This is intended to be a complete list of the properties on the National Register of Historic Places in Ford County, Kansas, United States. The locations of National Register properties for which the latitude and longitude coordinates are included below, may be seen in a map.

There are 16 properties listed on the National Register in the county.

This National Park Service list is complete through NPS recent listings posted October 23, 2026.

== Current listings ==
	Name on the Register	Image	Date listed	Location	City or town	Description
1	Atchison, Topeka and Santa Fe Railway Depot	Atchison, Topeka and Santa Fe Railway Depot	July 14, 2000 (#00000791)	E. Wyatt Earp Boulevard; 37°45′20″N 100°00′46″W	Dodge City	
2	Burr House	Burr House	January 31, 2008 (#07001481)	603 W. Spruce; 37°45′16″N 100°01′22″W	Dodge City	
3	Dodge City Downtown Historic District	Dodge City Downtown Historic District	November 4, 2009 (#09000875)	Roughly bounded by Front St. on the south, 3rd Ave. on the west, Vine St. on the north, and Central Ave. on the east 37°45′14″N 100°01′07″W	Dodge City	
4	Dodge City Municipal Building	Dodge City Municipal Building	May 1, 2013 (#13000217)	501 W. Spruce St. 37°45′16″N 100°01′19″W	Dodge City	
5	Dodge City Public Library	Dodge City Public Library	March 26, 1979 (#79000954)	2nd and Spruce Aves. 37°45′17″N 100°01′10″W	Dodge City	
6	Fort Dodge – Junior Officers' Quarters		August 6, 2024 (#100010625)	266 Custer Street; 37°43′56″N 99°56′12″W	Fort Dodge	
7	Hennessy Hall, Saint Mary of the Plains Campus	Hennessy Hall, Saint Mary of the Plains Campus	January 14, 2004 (#03001396)	240 San Jose Dr. 37°46′35″N 100°00′39″W	Dodge City	
8	Hillcrest Grocery		October 27, 2026 (#100013571)	1000 6th Avenue; 37°45′28″N 100°01′25″W	Dodge City	
9	Immaculate Heart of Mary Catholic Church	Immaculate Heart of Mary Catholic Church	January 5, 1989 (#88003087)	Southeast of Spearville; 37°47′06″N 99°38′28″W	Windthorst	
10	Lora Locke Hotel	Lora Locke Hotel	January 3, 1985 (#85000012)	Central and Gunsmoke Sts. 37°45′13″N 100°01′02″W	Dodge City	
11	Mueller-Schmidt House	Mueller-Schmidt House	February 23, 1972 (#72000499)	112 E. Vine St. 37°45′20″N 100°00′56″W	Dodge City	
12	Mulberry Creek Truss Bridge		April 13, 2026 (#100012905)	3 miles (4.8 km) west and 3 miles south of Ford, KS on Valley Road; 37°36′05″N 99°48′32″W	Dodge City vicinity	
13	Sacred Heart Cathedral	Sacred Heart Cathedral	February 10, 1983 (#83000426)	903 Central Ave. 37°45′23″N 100°01′01″W	Dodge City	
14	Santa Fe Trail-Ford County Segment 2	Santa Fe Trail-Ford County Segment 2	July 17, 2013 (#13000488)	SW. corner of Ridge & 129th Rds. 37°39′33″N 99°41′48″W	Ford	Santa Fe Trail Multiple Property Submission
15	Santa Fe Trail Ruts	Santa Fe Trail Ruts	October 15, 1966 (#66000343)	9 miles west of Dodge City on U.S. Route 50; 37°47′31″N 100°11′49″W	Dodge City	
16	Sawlog Creek Crossing on the Fort Hayes-Fort Dodge Road		July 17, 2013 (#13000489)	Address Restricted	Spearville	Santa Fe Trail Multiple Property Submission

== See also ==
- List of National Historic Landmarks in Kansas
- National Register of Historic Places listings in Kansas
