= Concord Township, Kansas =

Concord Township, Kansas may refer to:

- Concord Township, Ford County, Kansas
- Concord Township, Ottawa County, Kansas

== See also ==
- List of Kansas townships
- Concord Township (disambiguation)
