= Concord Township, Illinois =

Concord Township may refer to one of the following places in the State of Illinois:

- Concord Township, Adams County, Illinois
- Concord Township, Bureau County, Illinois
- Concord Township, Iroquois County, Illinois

See also

- Concord Township (disambiguation)
