= Bucklin Township =

Bucklin Township may refer to the following townships in the United States:

- Bucklin Township, Ford County, Kansas
- Bucklin Township, Michigan, a former name of Nankin Township, Michigan in Wayne County

== See also ==
- Bucklin (disambiguation)
