= Dodge City Army Air Field =

Former airfield in Ford County, Kansas

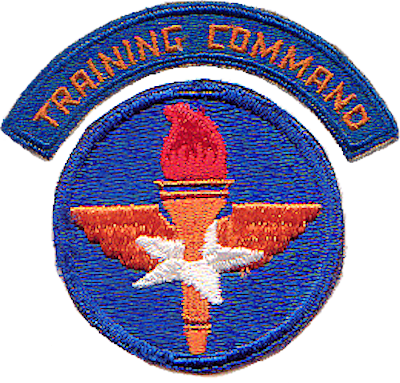
Dodge City Army Airfield
- Part of Army Air Forces Flying Training Command
- Fairview Township, Ford County, near Dodge City, Kansas
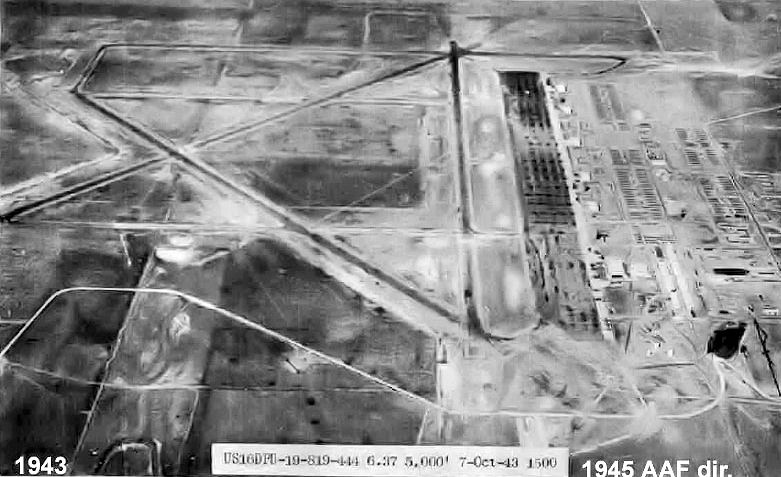
- Dodge City Army Airfield, 7 Oct 1943

Site information
- Type: Military airfield
- Controlled by: United States Army Air Forces

Location
- Location within Kansas
- Coordinates: 37°47′53″N 100°07′00″W

Site history
- Built: 1942
- In use: 1942–1945

Dodge City Army Airfield, also known as Ford County Airport and Dodge City Municipal Airport, is an abandoned airfield located in Ford County, Kansas, 6 miles (9.7 km) northwest of Dodge City.

== History ==
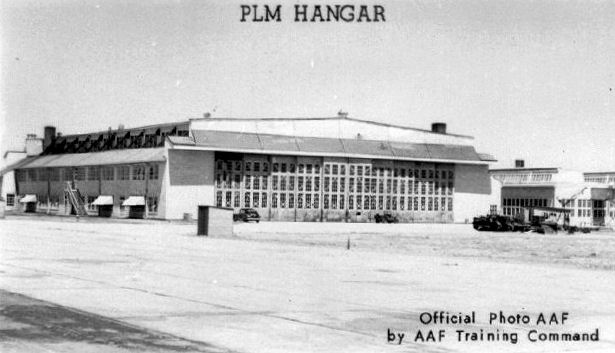
PLM Hangar, Dodge City AAF

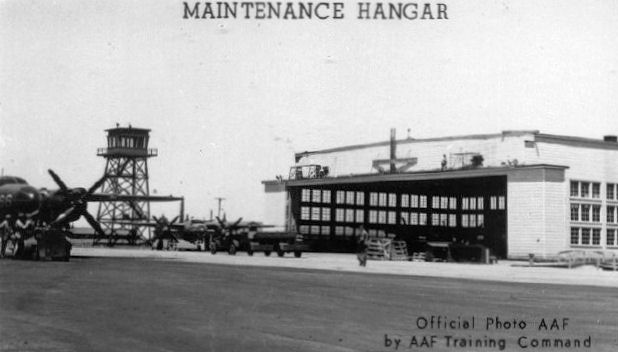
B-26s and maintenance hangar

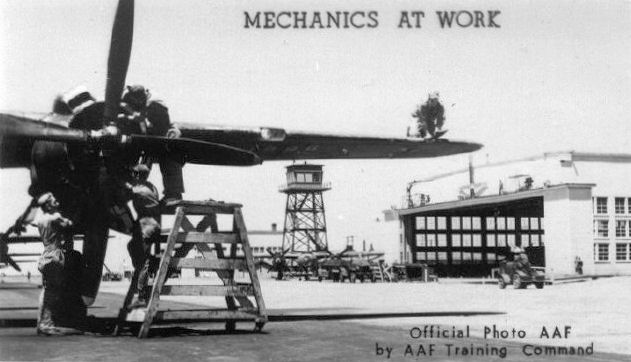
Ground maintenance of B-26 Marauders

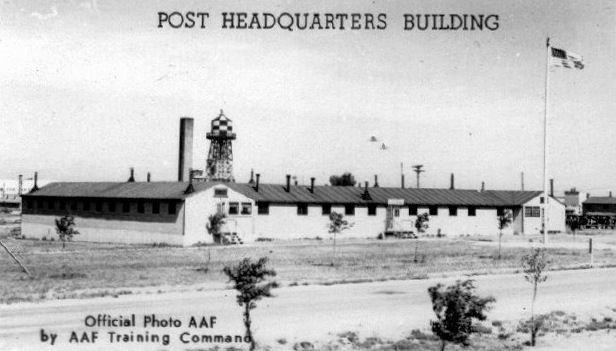
Dodge City AAF Post Headquarters

The Dodge City Chamber of Commerce, through its president, Jess C. Denious, was active during early 1942 in encouraging the government to locate an airfield in Dodge City as part of the Army Air Forces 70,000 Pilot Training Program. Mr. Denious, editor of the Dodge City Daily Globe, and lieutenant governor of Kansas, 1943–1947, made several trips to Washington to interview the appropriate authorities. In order to demonstrate the advantages of the locality, Denious had compiled considerable information on such things as weather, terrain, and utilities.

The first public announcement of the government's intention to construct an airfield at Dodge City was made on 10 June 1942. The purpose of the field, as stated at the time, was to provide bomber training for the Royal Air Force. However, nothing further was heard of this, and the base was scheduled to be an advanced flying school, so that its original designation was "Army Air Forces Advanced Flying School" This remained the field's intended function until February 1943, when, three or four months before operations would begin, the mission was changed to Martin B-26 Marauder medium bomber transition training.

Although the United States Engineers had surveyed the land desired for the field, bids for construction were let before the land was acquired. When the bids were opened it was discovered that only one bid had been submitted. A group of contractors, known as the Liston-Clarke, San-Ore, D. H. Hardman group, had joined to make the bid. The contract was awarded this group and the first truck load of building materials was unloaded on 6 August 1942.

Pending final settlement of the purchase, possession was obtained by Rights of Entry granted by the owners. On 15 August 1942 the Office of Chief of Army Engineers issued a directive authorizing the acquisition of approximately 2,520 acres at an estimated cost of $191,353.

Since the Division Engineers Real Estate Branch was unable to come to an agreement with the eight landowners involved, it was necessary to proceed by condemnation. A Declaration of Taking was consequently filed in the United States District Court for the District of Kansas at Topeka. This action of course vested title in the United States. At the same time the sum estimated by the War Department to be fair compensation was deposited with the District Court.

The principal construction of the facility consisted of building a cantonment, airdrome, roads, and facilities. The arrangement was standard rectangular, with building exteriors consisting of wood sheeting covered with 15-pound felt and asbestos-siding shingles. Housing was prepared for close to 4,000 men, while the hospital had a capacity of 177 beds. Warehousing was built to provide 71,186 square feet of space, and the airdrome could accommodate 165 aircraft.

Four runways (150 feet wide and 6,500 feet in length) were constructed, while six 75-foot taxiways connected the parking apron (600 x 5,300 feet) with the runway system. Work on the main construction project, begun on 5 August 1942, was completed by 31 December. Three or four days prior to completion of the main project, work was begun on the second most important project (principally concerned with completion of the runway system), which was finished by 31 March 1943. In addition to the main base and airfield, there are at least four auxiliary fields that were also constructed for emergency and training use in the area along with the use of Dodge City Municipal Airport

- Dodge City Auxiliary Army Airfield 37°53′58″N 100°17′23″W
- Jetmore Auxiliary Army Airfield #4 37°59′07″N 099°53′24″W
- Dodge City Municipal Airport 37°45′43″N 099°57′50″W

No records have been located on Dodge City AAAF 1,2,3 or the exact location of Dodge City AAAF.

=== Assigned units ===
Pictorial of base activities and personnel of Dodge City Army Air Field

The first soldiers assigned to the new base consisted of a detachment of 27 enlisted men of the Quartermaster Corps, under Capt. J. M. Cooper, who arrived on 1 November 1942.

Somewhat over a month later, on 11 December, the base was formally activated with the official designation "Army Air Forces Advanced Flying School, Dodge City, Kansas." As a result of a change of mission for the base, it was redesignated, 27 May 1943, "Army Air Forces Pilot School (Specialized 2-Engine), Dodge City Army Airfield, Dodge City, Kansas." After official activation of the base there was a rapid build-up of personnel strength, so much so that the local paper could observe on 2 February 1943: "Enlisted men are pouring into the new field by the hundreds."

Training at the base was under the immediate supervision of the director of training. The training function was broken up under the director into flying training under a director of flying, and ground school instruction under a director of technical training. In a re-organization of Army Air Force training units, the field came under the control of the 2515th Army Air Forces Base Unit, Army Air Forces Pilot School (Specialized 2-Engine), on 1 March 1944.

=== Advanced Twin Engine School ===
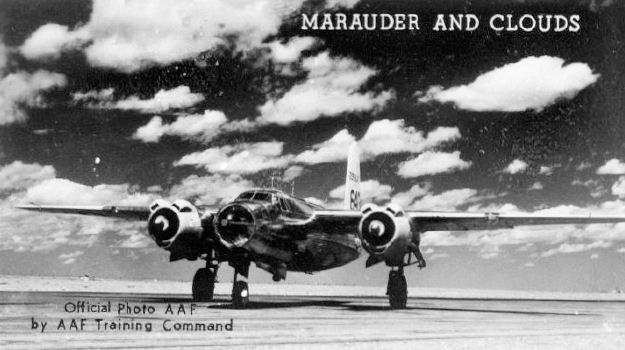
B-26 promotional photo of Dodge City AAF, 1944

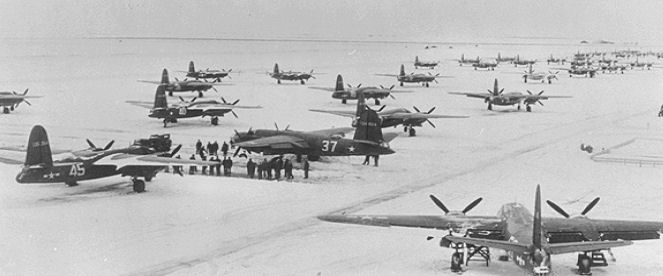
B-26 Marauders at Ddge City AAF in snow

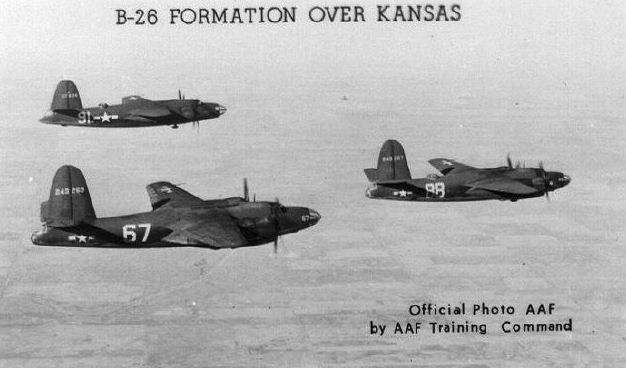
B-26 Formation Flying

Dodge City Army Airfield became one of three Martin B-26 Marauder training bases, the others being Tarrant Army Airfield, and Laughlin Army Airfield, both in Texas. The first planes to be used for instruction, a dozen B-26's, were delivered to Dodge City Army Air Field on 26 April 1943. On the same day, the first group of officer students, 36 in all, reported for B-26 transition training. No time was lost, for on 28 April the first training flights began. Most of the graduates were sent overseas to Ninth and Twelfth Air Forces in England and the Mediterranean Theaters, although Tenth Air Force in the CBI also flew Marauders.

In addition to the regular category of officer students in training, several of the classes included Free French Air Force pilot trainees, as well as contingents of Women Airforce Service Pilots (WASP's). The women pilots compared favorably with the men in all phases of the training, which was the same for both sexes.

During the active training period at the base, that is from 28 April 1943 to June 1945, an estimated 2,215 student officers, Free French, and WASP's received B-26 transition training.

The relations between the base and Dodge City were uniformly good. The limited size of the town created problems of housing for married officers and enlisted men, but this was the universal and normal wartime condition. The people of Dodge City showed themselves most co-operative in welcoming a large number of troops into their community. For example, during February 1943, various civic organizations co-operated in furnishing day rooms for the squadrons on the base. In March, the local Rotary, Kiwanis, and Lions Clubs presented a minstrel show which netted about $1,200 to aid in furnishing the day rooms.

Friendly co-operation was by no means a one-way street. During the Boot Hill Fair and Rodeo in September 1943, the Technical Training Department exhibited various types of equipment and instructional aids in a booth on the fair grounds. Outstanding for its co-operation was the Dodge City Daily Globe, which was consistently generous with publicity releases.

=== Inactivation ===
As the war in Europe ground to a halt the need for B-26 transition training was sharply curtailed, as no B-26s were assigned to the Pacific Theater or CBI (the B-25 Mitchell was used instead). Consequently, all training activities ceased with the class which graduated on 28 June 1945.

Two days later the official inactivation announcement was made by Central Flying Training Command, whereupon the officer in charge began the inactivation process. By 9 July all property had been turned in. Inactivation was officially completed on 31 July 1945 and all personnel had been transferred as of that date. Whereupon, Dodge City Army Air Field was placed on the inactive list.

The USAAF closed Dodge City AAF on 31 July 1945 and was placed reserve status. It was re designated as Dodge City Air Force Base in 1948, however it was not manned and was turned over to the Army's District Engineer, Seventh Service Command at Omaha, Nebraska who assumed jurisdiction over the base in 1949, pending disposition.

Excess buildings and demilitarized equipment were sold or transferred to other bases. The General Services Administration eventually turned the air base over to local government officials. The property was then opened as a civilian airport.

=== Postwar use ===
The facility was listed as "Dodge City Municipal Airport (Ford County)". Within the next four years the airport apparently lost some of its runway length, as the June 1954 USAF Wichita Sectional Chart depicted the field's longest runway as having gone down to 4,200'. The airport was not attended, and the manager was listed as William Meade.

Dodge City Municipal Airport was evidently closed at some point between 1954–62, with civil air traffic now utilizing Dodge City Regional Airport.

== Current status ==
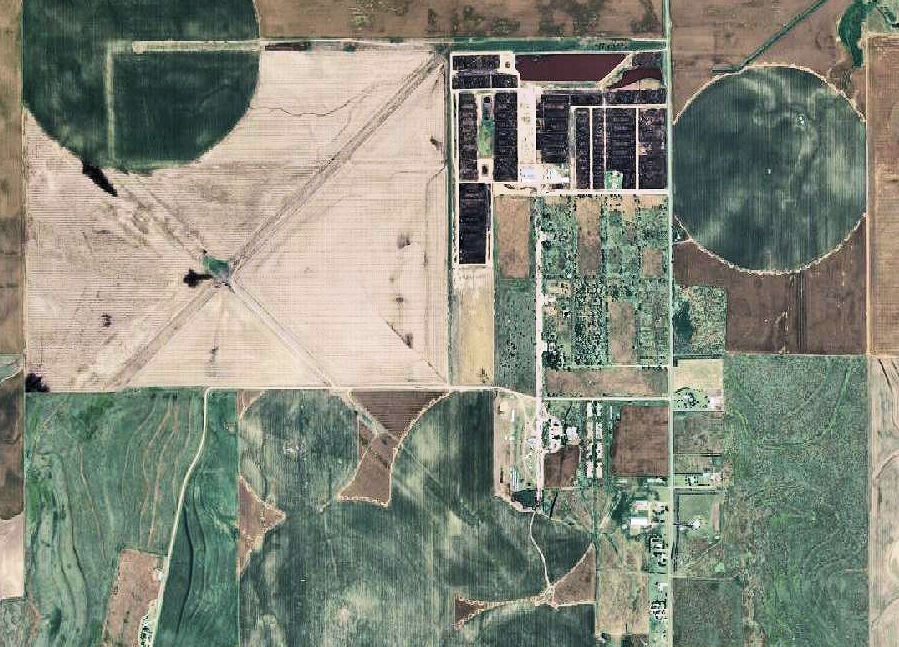
2006 USGS photo of what was Dodge City Army Airfield

The airfield & its buildings were subsequently reused for a variety of commercial purposes. Today, the Stanley Feed Yard occupies the site.

There is little left of the World War II Dodge City Army Airfield. The unused facility slowly deteriorated over the years, and in the early 1990s, the concrete runways and taxiways were progressively removed for farming. Agricultural fields have largely replaced the airfield. The administrative/technical site is gated by the present owner and is on private property, not accessible to the general public. Aerial imagery shows most of the concrete aircraft parking apron remains, the expansion joints clearly visible and separating the poured sections; one hangar remains standing in a very deteriorated state, the remains of two others which collapsed on the ground. A few derelict buildings remain standing, a few concrete foundations of others are all that remain.

Dodge City Army Airfield is on private property and can not be accessed by the general public without the owner's permission. The field can be reached by driving on U.S. Route 400 west from Dodge City, then turning north on Airport Road, Ford County 106 to be viewed from the highway.

== See also ==
- Kansas World War II Army Airfields
- 34th Flying Training Wing (World War II)
