= Bucklin =

Bucklin may refer to:

== Places in the United States ==
- Bucklin, Kansas
- Bucklin, Missouri
- Bucklin Township, Ford County, Kansas
- Bucklin Township, Michigan, a former name of Nankin Township, Michigan in Wayne County
- Bucklin Brook, Stream in Rhode Island,

== People with the surname ==
- John Bucklin (1773-1844), the first mayor of Louisville, Kentucky

== Other uses ==
- Bucklin voting, a voting method
