= Spearville =

Spearville may refer to some places in the United States:

- Spearville, Kansas
- Spearville Township, Ford County, Kansas
