= Windhorst, Kansas =

Unincorporated community in Ford County, Kansas

- Unincorporated community
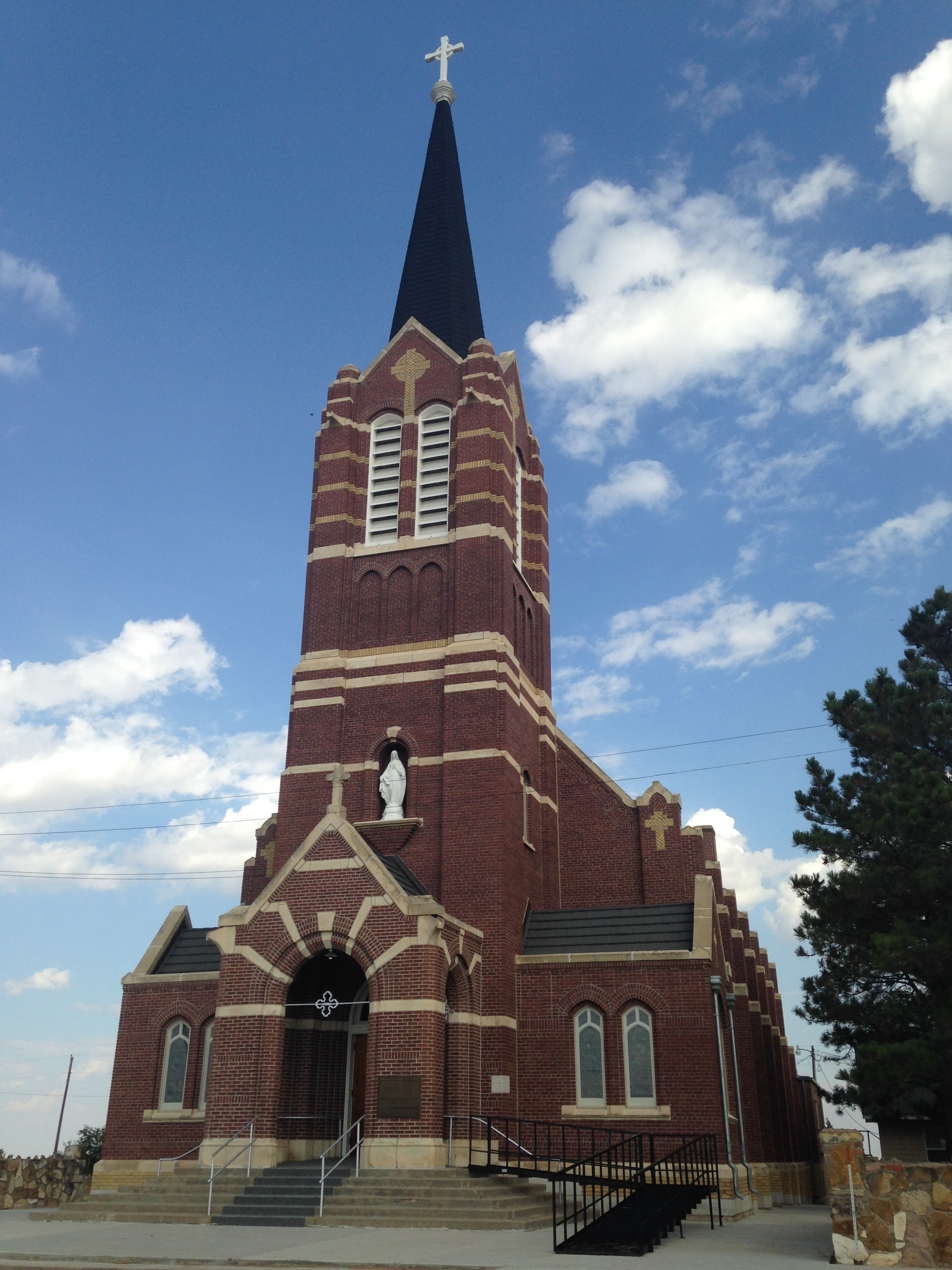
- Immaculate Heart of Mary Church (2014)

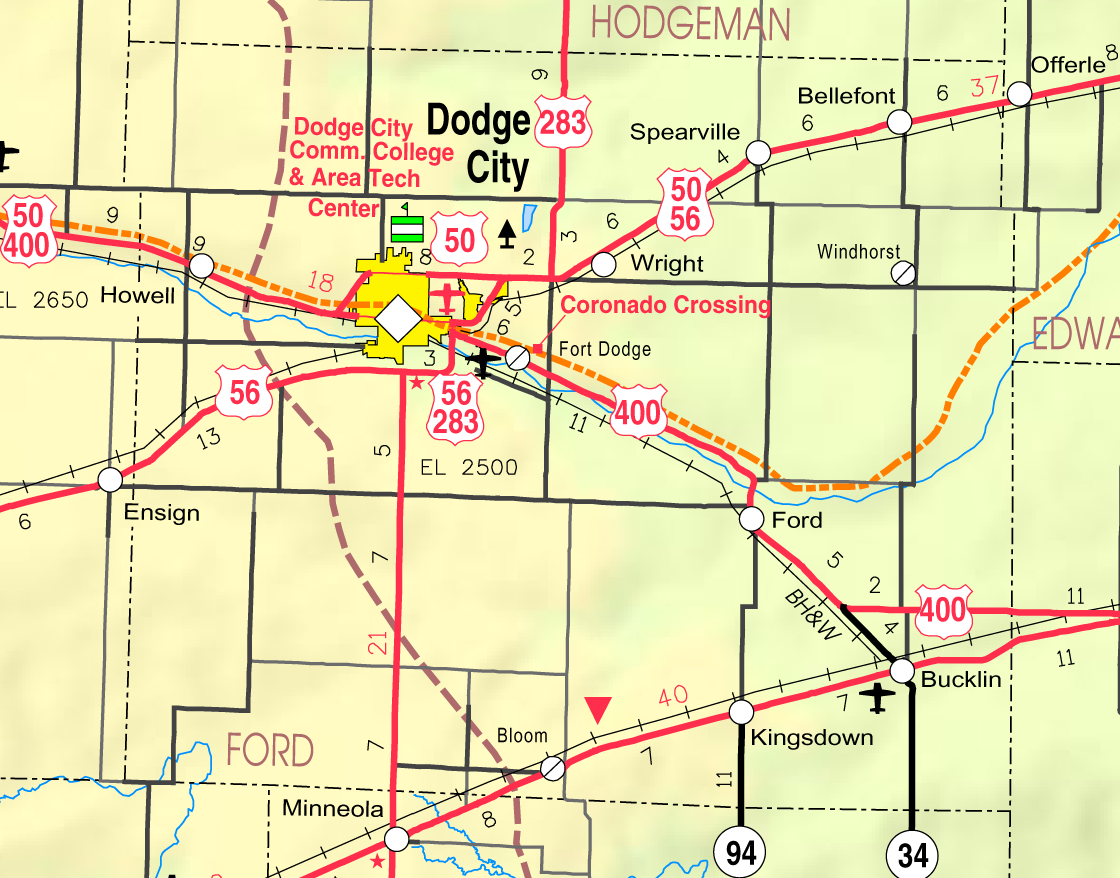
- KDOT map of Ford County (legend)

- Location within Kansas Location within the United States
- Coordinates: 37°47′07″N 99°38′31″W
- Country: United States
- State: Kansas
- County: Ford
- Elevation: 2,362 ft (720 m)
- Time zone: UTC-6 (CST)
  - Summer (DST): UTC-5 (CDT)
- Area code: 620
- FIPS code: 20-79825
- GNIS ID: 473746

Windhorst (also known as Windthorst) is an unincorporated community in Ford County, Kansas, United States. It is located along 131 Spur Rd between Iron Rd and Jewell Rd in a rural area between the communities of Bellefont and Bucklin, approximately 6 miles south of Bellefont or 15 miles north of Bucklin.

== History ==
A post office was opened in Windhorst in 1898, and remained in operation until it was discontinued in 1905.

The present-day community consists of a church, a school, a priest's house, and residential housing, but little more. The community is best known for the Immaculate Heart of Mary Church, which closed in 1997. It is listed in the National Register of Historic Places and can still be visited.

== Education ==
Windhorst is a part of USD 381 Spearville Schools. The Spearville High School mascot is the Royal Lancers.

Windhorst schools were closed through school unification. The Windhorst High School mascot was Bluejays. The Windhorst Bluejays won the Kansas State High School class B Baseball championship in 1956.
