= KDDC =

KDDC may refer to:

- Dodge City Regional Airport (ICAO code KDDC)
- KDDC-LD, a low-power television station (channel 32, virtual 23) licensed to serve Dodge City, Kansas, United States
