= Concord Township, Indiana =

Concord Township is the name of two townships in the U.S. state of Indiana:

- Concord Township, DeKalb County, Indiana
- Concord Township, Elkhart County, Indiana

== See also ==
- Concord Township (disambiguation)
