= Concord Township =

Concord Township may refer to the following places in the United States:

== Illinois ==
- Concord Township, Adams County, Illinois
- Concord Township, Bureau County, Illinois
- Concord Township, Iroquois County, Illinois

== Indiana ==
- Concord Township, DeKalb County, Indiana
- Concord Township, Elkhart County, Indiana

== Iowa ==
- Concord Township, Dubuque County, Iowa
- Concord Township, Hancock County, Iowa
- Concord Township, Hardin County, Iowa
- Concord Township, Louisa County, Iowa

== Kansas ==
- Concord Township, Ford County, Kansas

== Michigan ==
- Concord Township, Michigan

== Minnesota ==
- Concord Township, Minnesota

== Missouri ==
- Concord Township, Clinton County, Missouri
- Concord Township, Pemiscot County, Missouri
- Concord Township, Washington County, Missouri

== Nebraska ==
- Concord Township, Dixon County, Nebraska

== North Carolina ==
- Concord Township, Iredell County, North Carolina

== Ohio ==
- Concord Township, Champaign County, Ohio
- Concord Township, Delaware County, Ohio
- Concord Township, Fayette County, Ohio
- Concord Township, Highland County, Ohio
- Concord Township, Lake County, Ohio
- Concord Township, Miami County, Ohio
- Concord Township, Ross County, Ohio

== Pennsylvania ==
- Concord Township, Butler County, Pennsylvania
- Concord Township, Delaware County, Pennsylvania
- Concord Township, Erie County, Pennsylvania

== See also ==
- Concord (disambiguation)
