= Immaculate Heart of Mary Catholic Church (Windthorst, Kansas) =

Historic church in Kansas, United States

- U.S. National Register of Historic Places
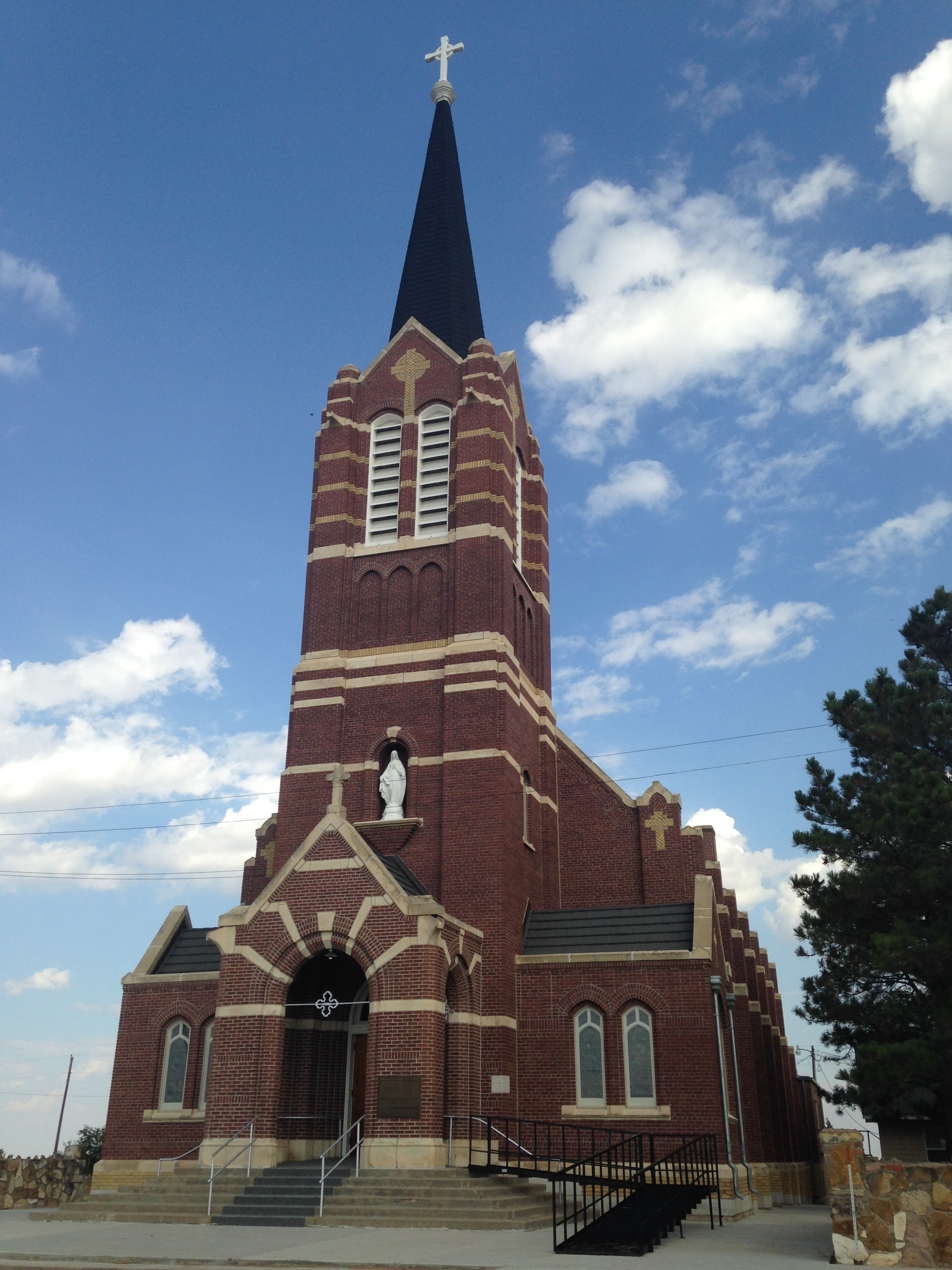

- Location within Kansas Location within the United States
- Location: Windthorst, Kansas
- Coordinates: 37°47′6″N 99°38′28″W
- Area: less than one acre
- Built: c. 1911–13
- Architect: Preuss & Aimes, Co.
- Architectural style: Late 19th and 20th Century Revivals, Gothic Romanesque Revival
- NRHP reference No.: 88003087
- Added to NRHP: January 5, 1989

Immaculate Heart of Mary Catholic Church is a historic church in Windthorst, Kansas, which is located in a rural area between the communities of Bellefont and Bucklin, approximately 6 miles south of Bellefont or 15 miles north of Bucklin. The church was built during c. 1911–13 and added to the National Register of Historic Places in 1989. It is 54 by 150 feet (16 m × 46 m) in plan and has a center steeple which rises about 125 feet (38 m).
