= Ford Township =

Ford Township may refer to:

- Ford Township, Ford County, Kansas
- Ford Township, Kanabec County, Minnesota
- Ford Township, a geographic township in Unorganized North Cochrane District, Ontario, Canada

== See also ==
- Ford River Township, Michigan
