= Royal Township, Kansas =

Royal Township
- Township
- Location in Ford County
- Coordinates: 37°52′12″N 100°07′05″W
- Country: United States
- State: Kansas
- County: Ford

Area
  - Total: 71.64 sq mi (185.54 km^{2})
  - Land: 71.59 sq mi (185.43 km^{2})
  - Water: 0.042 sq mi (0.11 km^{2}) 0.06%
- Elevation: 2,615 ft (797 m)

Population (2020)
  - Total: 228
  - Density: 3.18/sq mi (1.23/km^{2})
- GNIS feature ID: 0471628

Royal Township is a township in Ford County, Kansas, United States. As of the 2020 census, its population was 228.

== Geography ==
Royal Township covers an area of 71.64 square miles (185.5 km^{2}) and contains no incorporated settlements. According to the USGS, it contains one cemetery, Ridenour.
