= Dodge Township, Kansas =

Dodge Township
- Township
- Location in Ford County
- Coordinates: 37°46′48″N 100°01′59″W
- Country: United States
- State: Kansas
- County: Ford

Area
  - Total: 27.2 sq mi (70.4 km^{2})
  - Land: 27.12 sq mi (70.25 km^{2})
  - Water: 0.058 sq mi (0.15 km^{2}) 0.21%
- Elevation: 2,612 ft (796 m)

Population (2020)
  - Total: 683
  - Density: 25.2/sq mi (9.72/km^{2})
- GNIS ID: 471661

Dodge Township is a township in Ford County, Kansas, United States. As of the 2020 census, its population was 683.

== Geography ==
Dodge Township covers an area of 27.18 square miles (70.4 km^{2}) and surrounds most of Dodge City (the county seat). According to the USGS, it contains one cemetery, Greencrest Memorial Garden.

== Demographics ==
Historical population
Census	Pop.	Note	%±
2000	899		—
2020	683		—

As of the 2020 census, there were 683 people, 299 households, and 230 families residing in the township.
