= Ford Township, Kansas =

Ford Township
- Township
- Location in Ford County
- Coordinates: 37°36′33″N 099°47′35″W
- Country: United States
- State: Kansas
- County: Ford

Area
  - Total: 96.27 sq mi (249.35 km^{2})
  - Land: 96.26 sq mi (249.32 km^{2})
  - Water: 0.012 sq mi (0.03 km^{2}) 0.01%
- Elevation: 2,408 ft (734 m)

Population (2020)
  - Total: 329
  - Density: 3.42/sq mi (1.32/km^{2})
- GNIS feature ID: 0473895

Ford Township is a township in Ford County, Kansas, United States. As of the 2020 census, its population was 329.

== Geography ==
Ford Township covers an area of 96.27 square miles (249.3 km^{2}) and contains one incorporated settlement, Ford. According to the USGS, it contains one cemetery, Ford.

The stream of Mulberry Creek runs through this township.
