= Sodville Township, Kansas =

Sodville Township
- Township
- Location in Ford County
- Coordinates: 37°31′22″N 099°42′51″W
- Country: United States
- State: Kansas
- County: Ford

Area
  - Total: 55.93 sq mi (144.87 km^{2})
  - Land: 55.93 sq mi (144.86 km^{2})
  - Water: 0.0077 sq mi (0.02 km^{2}) 0.01%
- Elevation: 2,487 ft (758 m)

Population (2020)
  - Total: 89
  - Density: 1.6/sq mi (0.61/km^{2})
- GNIS feature ID: 0470699

Sodville Township is a township in Ford County, Kansas, United States. As of the 2020 census, its population was 89.

== Geography ==
Sodville Township covers an area of 55.94 square miles (144.9 km^{2}) and contains no incorporated settlements. According to the USGS, it contains one cemetery, Sodville.
