= Dodge City High School =

Location
- 2201 Ross Boulevard; Dodge City, Kansas 67801; United States; 37.78261597882604°N 100.04341112744585°W

Information
- School type: Public, High School
- Motto: Know Where You Are Going, Remember Where You Came From!
- Established: 1873
- School district: Dodge City USD 443
- CEEB code: 170783
- Principal: Daniel Ackerman
- Staff: 100.75 (FTE)
- Grades: 9 to 12
- Gender: coed
- Enrollment: 2,141 (2023–2024)
- Student to teacher ratio: 21.25
- Campus: Urban
- Colors: Scarlet Red; Royal Blue
- Athletics conference: Western Athletic Conference
- Mascot: Red Demons
- Rival: Garden City High School
- Newspaper: The Dodger
- Website: School Webpage

Dodge City High School is a public high school located in Dodge City, Kansas, United States, serving students in grades 9–12. The school is operated by Dodge City USD 443 school district. The current principal is Martha Mendoza - a graduate of DCHS (Class of 1989).

Dodge City is a member of the Kansas State High School Activities Association and offers a variety of sports programs. Extracurricular activities include the performing arts, school publications, and clubs. Athletic teams compete in the 6A classification and are known as the "Red Demons".

== History ==
Dodge City Senior High School was established in 1873 to help educate the increasing population of Dodge City. During the 1990s, enrollment continued to increase and it soon became evident that the student population had outgrown the facilities of the old high school built in 1928. As a result, voters passed a bond issue to construct a new $35M high school. In 2001, DCHS moved into a new spacious facility divided into four academic wings named after famous Dodge City families (Sughrue, Toalson, Hoover, and McCarty). The new 2,200-seat Field House became the home site for the volleyball, basketball, and wrestling programs. The 900-seat Performing Arts Center provides a state of the art facility for the Fine Arts department

In 2018, the current facility was expanded to include two more academic wings (Denious & Crum). An indoor practice facility and new vocational wing were also added to increase course offerings and provide space for training and practices. The expansion increased the square footage of Dodge City High School to just under 500,000 square feet.

== Academics ==
In the fall of 2001, the school adopted the Academic Enhancement Plan. The plan seeks to continuously improve student achievement every year by focusing on 5 key components of learning, consisting of reading, mathematics, writing, diversity, and technology.

== Activities ==
The extracurricular activities offered at Dodge City High School are many and varied due to the school's large size. The Red Demons compete in the Western Athletic Conference and are classified as a 6A school, the largest classification in Kansas according to the Kansas State High School Activities Association. Throughout its history, Dodge City has won state championships in seven different sports with the most recent being girls wrestling (2022).

== Mascot ==
In 1927, a newspaper writer for the Dodge City Globe writer mistakenly began referring to the school’s teams as the Red Demons due to the nickname of “D-Men” for the letter-jackets worn by the Dodge men's teams. The name stuck until 1932 when the controversial mascot was replaced by the Pilldilly - a Jayhawk looking bird made up of the letters D-C-H-S. However, in 1940 - the Demon returned and became the official mascot of Dodge City Senior High School. According to the 1944 yearbook, sub-varsity teams began using the name “Cowboys” and “Demons” was reserved solely for varsity teams. In 2001, the Dodge City School Board voted to keep the Red Demon as the official school mascot. The mascot had been often debated due to many in the community believing that the Demon presented a negative image for the school and its students.

== Athletics ==
=== Football ===
DCHS has played football for over 120 seasons - fielding their first team in 1898. The Red Demons won the state championship in football in 1970 under legendary coach J.C. Riekenberg. Dick Masters (173-62-1) is the school’s all-time winningest coach and had a streak 21-straight winning seasons from 1975-1995. In 1938, the annual rivalry game against Garden City became the “Hatchet Game”. Dodge City leads the overall series with Garden City (77-43-4) and the Hatchet Series (52-31-1).

=== Baseball ===
DCHS has played baseball almost as long as they have football with the first teams dating back to the early 1900’s. The Red Demons won the KSHSAA 6A state championship in 1999. The 1933 team is considered by many as Dodge City’s “mythical” state championship team. The team went undefeated and won the Wichita Tournament - a predecessor to the KSHSAA State Tournament.

=== Soccer ===
Boys soccer was incorporated at DCHS in 1995. Girls soccer was added in 1999. In 2020, the boys program became the first Kansas high school boys soccer program to have two unbeaten state championship seasons; 21–0 in 2016 and 20–0 in 2020. Current head coach, Saul Hernandez, is a Dodge City High School alumnus and led the Red Demons to both of their state soccer titles.

=== State championships ===
State Championships
Season	Sport	Number of Championships	Year
Fall	Football	0	
Fall	Cross Country, Boys	0	
Fall	Golf, Girls	0	
Fall	Soccer, Boys	0	
Winter	Wrestling, Girls	0	
Spring	Baseball	0	
Spring	Golf, Boys	0	
Total		0	

=== Non-athletic programs ===
==== Marching Band ====
The Dodge City High School Marching Band is one of the largest extracurricular programs offered at DCHS in terms of student participation. They are "The Pride of Southwest Kansas". In December 2010, the Marching Band traveled to Orlando, Florida to represent Dodge City in the Citrus Bowl Parade The band has a rich history of representing the community across the nation. In 1961 and again in 1976, the band participated in the Tournament of Rose Parade in Pasadena, California. They participated in the Cotton Bowl Parade at least twice. They have also attended the Cherry Blossom Festival in Washington DC.

==== Debate/Forensics ====
The debate team won the four speaker state championship in 1922 and 1938.

== Notable people ==
Faculty

- Woody Woodard, athletic director at McPherson College and head football coach at SMU and Wichita State

Alumni

- Dale Burnett, former NFL running back with the New York Giants
- Robert Delpino, former NFL running back with the Los Angeles Rams and Denver Broncos
- Billy Dewell, former NFL wide receiver with the Chicago Cardinals
- Fred Hall, 33rd governor of Kansas from 1955 to 1957
- Mike Montgomery, former NFL running back with the Dallas Cowboys
- Dick Tomlinson, former NFL offensive guard with the Pittsburgh Steelers

== See also ==
- List of high schools in Kansas
- List of unified school districts in Kansas
