= Wheatland Township, Ford County, Kansas =

Wheatland Township
- Township
- Location in Ford County
- Coordinates: 37°49′00″N 099°37′29″W
- Country: United States
- State: Kansas
- County: Ford

Area
  - Total: 74.39 sq mi (192.68 km^{2})
  - Land: 74.39 sq mi (192.68 km^{2})
  - Water: 0 sq mi (0 km^{2}) 0%
- Elevation: 2,316 ft (706 m)

Population (2020)
  - Total: 139
  - Density: 1.87/sq mi (0.721/km^{2})
- GNIS feature ID: 0473534

Wheatland Township is a township in Ford County, Kansas, United States. As of the 2020 census, its population was 139.

== Geography ==
Wheatland Township covers an area of 74.4 square miles (193 km^{2}) and contains no incorporated settlements. According to the USGS, it contains three cemeteries: Evergreen, Holy Cross and Saint Joseph.

The stream of Cow Creek runs through this township.
