= Wright, Kansas =

Unincorporated community in Ford County, Kansas

- Unincorporated community and CDP
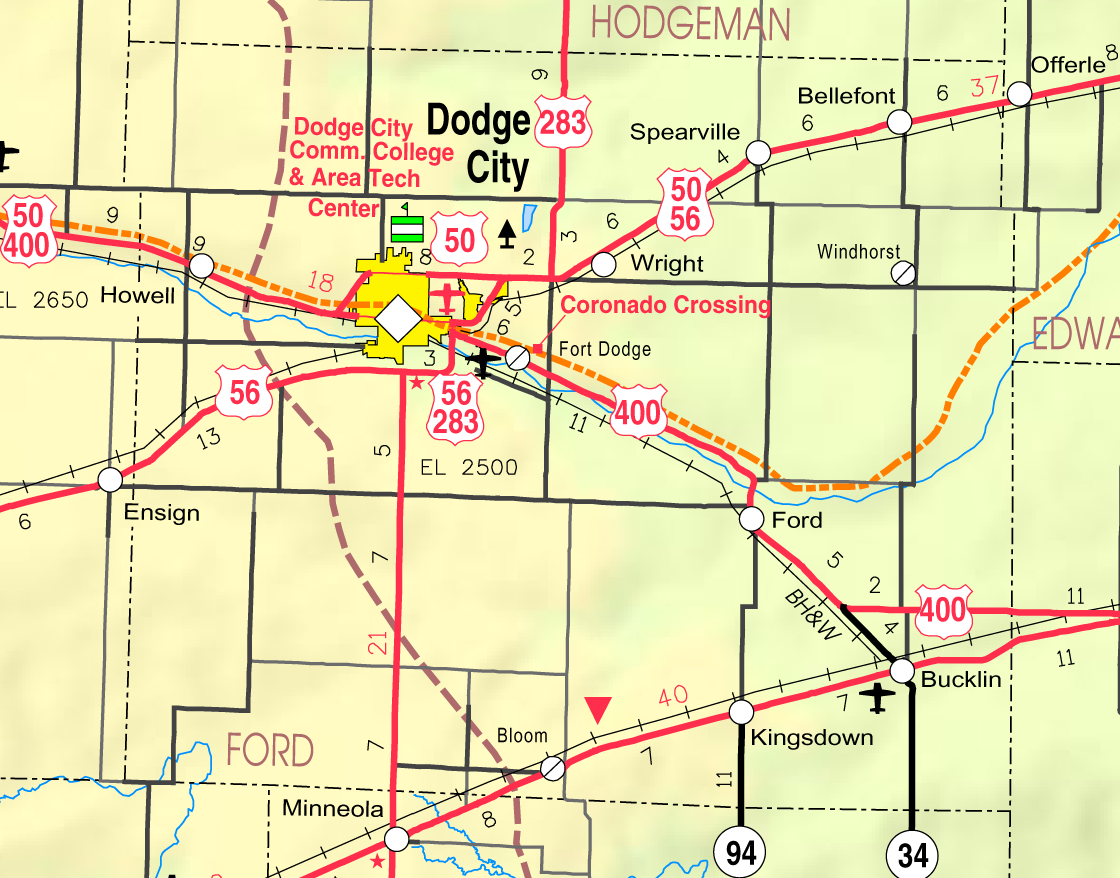
- KDOT map of Ford County (legend)

- Location within Kansas Location within the United States
- Coordinates: 37°46′50″N 99°53′31″W
- Country: United States
- State: Kansas
- County: Ford
- Named for: Robert Wright

Area
  - Total: 2.06 sq mi (5.33 km^{2})
  - Land: 2.06 sq mi (5.33 km^{2})
  - Water: 0 sq mi (0.0 km^{2})
- Elevation: 2,530 ft (770 m)

Population (2020)
  - Total: 145
  - Density: 70.5/sq mi (27.2/km^{2})
- Time zone: UTC-6 (CST)
  - Summer (DST): UTC-5 (CDT)
- ZIP Code: 67882
- Area code: 620
- FIPS code: 20-80500
- GNIS ID: 2629188

Wright is an unincorporated community and census-designated place (CDP) in Ford County, Kansas, United States. As of the 2020 census, the population was 145. It is located along Highway 50.

== History ==
Wright is named for Robert M. Wright, a member of the Kansas House of Representatives from 1875 to 1883 and one of the founders and early mayors of Dodge City.

== Geography ==
Wright is located on U.S. Routes 50 and U.S. Route 56, 7 miles (11 km) east of Dodge City.

=== Climate ===
The climate in this area is characterized by hot, humid summers and generally mild to cool winters. According to the Köppen Climate Classification system, Wright has a humid subtropical climate, abbreviated "Cfa" on climate maps.

== Demographics ==
Historical population
Census	Pop.	Note	%±
2010	163		—
2020	145		−11.0%
U.S. Decennial Census

== Government ==
Wright has a post office with ZIP Code 67882.

== Education ==
The community is served by Dodge City USD 443 public school district.
