= Wilroads Gardens, Kansas =

Unincorporated community in Ford County, Kansas

- Unincorporated community and CDP
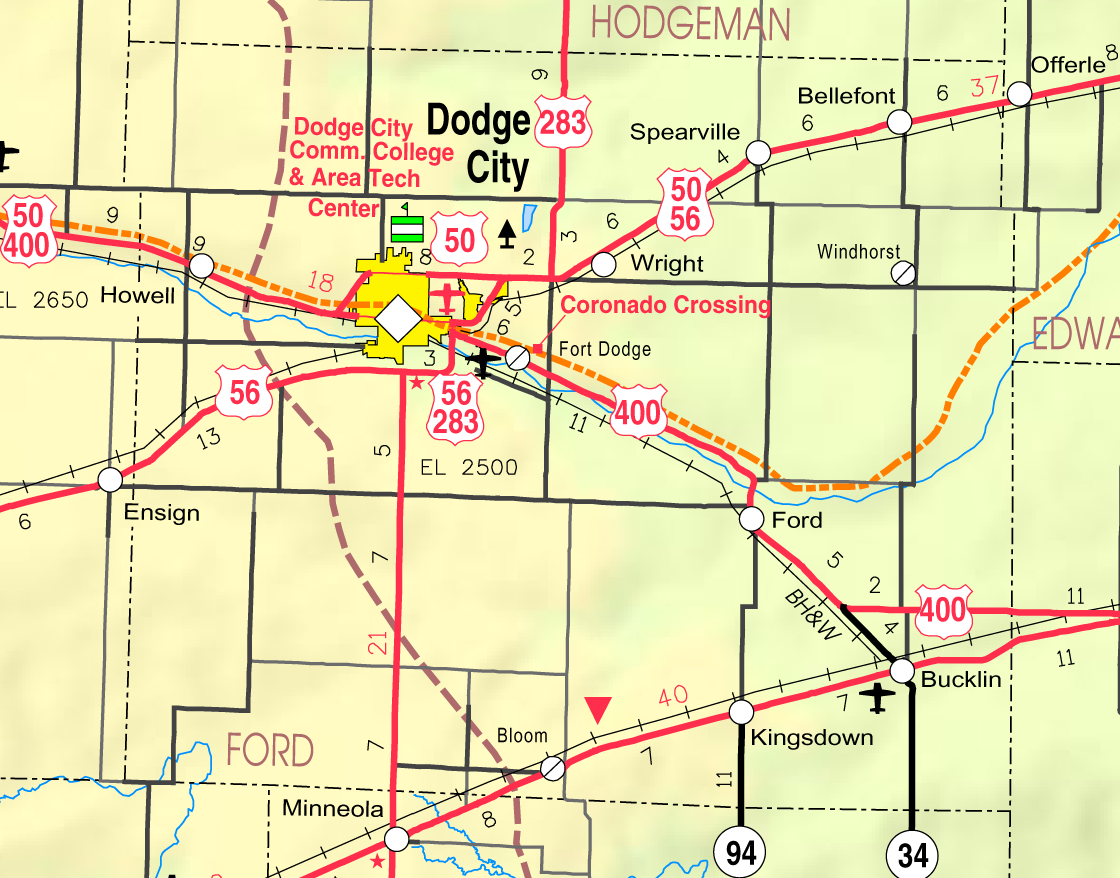
- KDOT map of Ford County (legend)

- Location within Kansas Location within the United States
- Coordinates: 37°43′27″N 99°55′59″W
- Country: United States
- State: Kansas
- County: Ford

Area
  - Total: 2.253 sq mi (5.84 km^{2})
  - Land: 2.253 sq mi (5.84 km^{2})
  - Water: 0 sq mi (0 km^{2})
- Elevation: 2,444 ft (745 m)

Population (2020)
  - Total: 639
  - Density: 284/sq mi (110/km^{2})
- Time zone: UTC-6 (CST)
  - Summer (DST): UTC-5 (CDT)
- ZIP Code: 67801
- Area code: 620
- FIPS code: 20-79625
- GNIS ID: 473893

Wilroads Gardens is an unincorporated community and census-designated place (CDP) in Ford County, Kansas, United States. As of the 2020 census, the population was 639. It is located approximately one mile south of Highway 50 at 117 Rd.

== Demographics ==
Historical population
Census	Pop.	Note	%±
2010	609		—
2020	639		4.9%
U.S. Decennial Census

== Education ==
The community is served by Dodge City USD 443 public school district.
