= Dodge City Regional Airport =

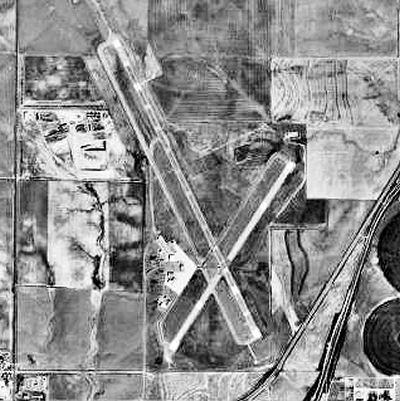
- USGS 1991 orthophoto
- IATA: DDC; ICAO: KDDC; FAA LID: DDC

Summary
- Airport type: Public
- Owner: City of Dodge City
- Serves: Southwest Kansas
- Elevation AMSL: 2,594 ft (791 m)
- Coordinates: 37°45′47″N 099°57′56″W
- Website: DDC Website

Map
- Location of airport in Kansas / United States DDC (the United States)

Runways
Direction	Length		Surface
Direction	ft	m	Surface
2/20	4,649	1,417	Concrete
14/32	6,899	2,103	Concrete

Statistics (2015)
- Aircraft operations: 23,501
- Based aircraft: 25
- Source: Federal Aviation Administration

Dodge City Regional Airport (IATA: DDC, ICAO: KDDC, FAA LID: DDC) is three miles east of Dodge City, in Ford County, Kansas. It is used for general aviation and is served by one scheduled airline, subsidized by the federal government's Essential Air Service program at an annual cost of $6,160,110.

The National Plan of Integrated Airport Systems for 2011–2015 categorized it as a non-primary commercial service facility. The Federal Aviation Administration says this airport had 4,701 passenger boardings (enplanements) in calendar year 2008, 3,373 in 2009 and 3,853 in 2010.

== Facilities ==
The airport covers 451 acres (183 ha) at an elevation of 2,594 feet (791 m). It has two asphalt runways: 14/32 is 6,899 by 100 feet (2,103 x 30 m) and 2/20 is 4,649 by 100 feet (1,417 x 30 m).

In the year ending January 31, 2008 the airport had 23,501 aircraft operations, average 64 per day: 77% general aviation, 16% airline, 6% air taxi, and 1% military. 33 aircraft were then based at this airport: 82% single-engine and 18% multi-engine.

== Airlines and destinations ==
United Express connects Dodge City Airport to Denver International Airport.

Destinations map
Destinations from Dodge City Regional Airport

=== Statistics ===
Carrier shares (Calendar Year 2024)
Carrier	Passengers (arriving and departing)
SkyWest	16,350(100%)

Top domestic destination (Calendar Year 2024)
Rank	Airport	Passengers	Airline
1	Denver International (DEN)	8,100	SkyWest
2	Liberal (LBL)	200	SkyWest

== See also ==
- Dodge City Army Airfield, which later became Dodge City Municipal Airport (now closed)
- List of airports in Kansas
