= Richland Township, Ford County, Kansas =

Richland Township
- Township
- Location in Ford County
- Coordinates: 37°42′00″N 100°02′33″W
- Country: United States
- State: Kansas
- County: Ford

Area
  - Total: 38.2 sq mi (98.9 km^{2})
  - Land: 38.12 sq mi (98.74 km^{2})
  - Water: 0.066 sq mi (0.17 km^{2}) 0.17%
- Elevation: 2,566 ft (782 m)

Population (2020)
  - Total: 893
  - Density: 23.4/sq mi (9.04/km^{2})
- GNIS feature ID: 0471675

Richland Township is a township in Ford County, Kansas, United States. As of the 2000 census, its population was 931. This had declined to 893 at the 2020 census.

== Geography ==
Richland Township covers an area of 38.19 square miles (98.9 km^{2}) and contains no incorporated settlements.
