= Enterprise Township, Ford County, Kansas =

Enterprise Township
- Township
- Location in Ford County
- Coordinates: 37°38′27″N 099°56′34″W
- Country: United States
- State: Kansas
- County: Ford

Area
  - Total: 67.52 sq mi (174.87 km^{2})
  - Land: 67.39 sq mi (174.53 km^{2})
  - Water: 0.13 sq mi (0.34 km^{2}) 0.19%
- Elevation: 2,560 ft (780 m)

Population (2020)
  - Total: 998
  - Density: 14.8/sq mi (5.72/km^{2})
- GNIS feature ID: 0473894

Enterprise Township is a township in Ford County, Kansas, United States. As of the 2020 census, its population was 998.

== Geography ==
Enterprise Township covers an area of 67.52 square miles (174.9 km^{2}) and contains no incorporated settlements.
