= Wilburn Township, Kansas =

Wilburn Township
- Township
- Location in Ford County
- Coordinates: 37°31′27″N 100°03′46″W
- Country: United States
- State: Kansas
- County: Ford

Area
  - Total: 72.34 sq mi (187.35 km^{2})
  - Land: 72.34 sq mi (187.35 km^{2})
  - Water: 0 sq mi (0 km^{2}) 0%
- Elevation: 2,608 ft (795 m)

Population (2020)
  - Total: 78
  - Density: 1.1/sq mi (0.42/km^{2})
- GNIS feature ID: 0470691

Wilburn Township is a township in Ford County, Kansas, United States. As of the 2020 census, its population was 78.

== Geography ==
Wilburn Township covers an area of 72.34 square miles (187.4 km^{2}) and contains no incorporated settlements.
