= Bourbonais, Illinois =

- Former settlement
- Location within Illinois
- Coordinates: 41°20′37″N 89°38′07″W
- Country: United States
- State: Illinois
- County: Bureau
- Elevation: 682 ft (208 m)
- GNIS feature ID: 1822630

Bourbonais is a former settlement in Bureau County, Illinois, United States. Bourbonais was located in Concord Township, along the Burlington railroad line southwest of Wyanet and northeast of Buda. It was platted in 1864.

The settlement was named for a man of mixed French and Native American ancestry who had settled in this general area in 1820.
