= Santa Fe Trail Remains =

- Santa Fe Trail Ruts
- U.S. National Register of Historic Places
- U.S. National Historic Landmark
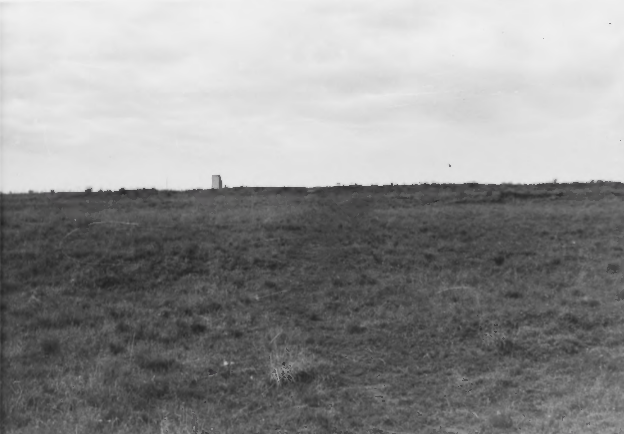
- View of the trail remains in 1975; a monument with plaque is visible in the distance

- Location within Kansas Location within the United States
- Nearest city: Dodge City, Kansas
- Coordinates: 37°47′31″N 100°11′49″W
- Area: 140.4 acres (56.8 ha)
- Built: 1821
- NRHP reference No.: 66000343

Significant dates
- Added to NRHP: October 15, 1966
- Designated NHL: May 23, 1963

The Santa Fe Trail Remains, also known as Santa Fe Trail Ruts, are a two-mile (3 km) section of the former 1,200-mile (1,900 km) long Santa Fe Trail, described as the "longest continuous stretch of clearly defined Santa Fe Trail rut remains in Kansas." Now owned by a preservation organization, the site is visible from a pull-off area on United States Route 50 near Dodge City, Kansas. The site was declared a National Historic Landmark in 1963.

== Description ==
The Santa Fe Trail Remains are located about 10 miles (16 km) west of Dodge City, on 140 acres (57 ha) of former agricultural land. The ruts extend for about 2 miles (3.2 km), with a width of as much as 400 feet (120 m) of rutted terrain. The actual trail route is crossed in several places, by US 50, a railroad right-of-way, and irrigation ditches. The ruts have also been harmed by past use of the property for grazing. The landscape looks much today as it did in the 19th century, except for these intrusions, as well as the shifting of the Arkansas River to follow a more southerly route than it did during the trail's period of use.

The Santa Fe Trail was one of the first great westward migration trails, inaugurated by trader William Becknell in 1821, connecting Independence, Missouri with Santa Fe, the capital of Spanish (and later Mexican) Nuevo México. It served as a major conduit for the development of the American West, until it was effectively supplanted by railroads around 1880. Much of the trail's route is known, but few traces of it survive. Although there are other sections of Santa Fe Trail ruts that are listed on the National Register of Historic Places, this one is one of the longest and best-preserved.

== See also ==
- Oregon Trail Ruts (Guernsey, Wyoming)
- National Register of Historic Places listings in Ford County, Kansas
- List of National Historic Landmarks in Kansas
