= Spearville Township, Kansas =

Spearville Township
- Township
- Location in Ford County
- Coordinates: 37°46′42″N 099°46′42″W
- Country: United States
- State: Kansas
- County: Ford

Area
  - Total: 185.07 sq mi (479.32 km^{2})
  - Land: 185.01 sq mi (479.17 km^{2})
  - Water: 0.058 sq mi (0.15 km^{2}) 0.03%
- Elevation: 2,405 ft (733 m)

Population (2020)
  - Total: 1,163
  - Density: 6.286/sq mi (2.427/km^{2})
- GNIS feature ID: 0473735

Spearville Township is a township in Ford County, Kansas, United States. As of the 2020 census, its population was 1,163.

== Geography ==
Spearville Township covers an area of 185.07 square miles (479.3 km^{2}) and contains one incorporated settlement, Spearville. According to the USGS, it contains two cemeteries: Saint Johns and Silent Land.

== Transportation ==
Spearville Township contains two airports or landing strips: Knoeber Landing Strip and Shehan Airpark.
