= Dick Tomlinson =

American football player (born 1928)

No. 62
- Position: Guard

Personal information
- Born: August 5, 1928 (age 98); Chicago, Illinois, U.S.
- Listed height: 6 ft 1 in (1.85 m)
- Listed weight: 205 lb (93 kg)

Career information
- High school: Dodge City (Dodge City, Kansas)
- College: Kansas
- NFL draft: 1950: 21st round, 268th overall pick

Career history
- Pittsburgh Steelers (1950–1951)

Awards and highlights
- 2× First-team All-Big Seven (1948, 1949)

Career NFL statistics
- Games played: 24
- Games started: 24
- Stats at Pro Football Reference

Richard Kent Tomlinson (born August 5, 1928) is an American former professional football player who was a guard for the Pittsburgh Steelers of the National Football League (NFL). He played college football for the Kansas Jayhawks after attending Dodge City High School in Dodge City, Kansas. Tomlinson turned 95 in August 2023.
