= Fairview Township, Ford County, Kansas =

Fairview Township
- Township
- Location in Ford County
- Coordinates: 37°44′13″N 100°09′40″W
- Country: United States
- State: Kansas
- County: Ford

Area
  - Total: 72.71 sq mi (188.33 km^{2})
  - Land: 72.67 sq mi (188.22 km^{2})
  - Water: 0.042 sq mi (0.11 km^{2}) 0.06%
- Elevation: 2,608 ft (795 m)

Population (2020)
  - Total: 277
  - Density: 3.81/sq mi (1.47/km^{2})
- GNIS feature ID: 0471659

Fairview Township is a township in Ford County, Kansas, United States. As of the 2020 census, its population was 277.

== Geography ==
Fairview Township covers an area of 72.71 square miles (188.3 km^{2}) and contains no incorporated settlements.
