= Concord Township, Dodge County, Minnesota =

Concord Township, Minnesota
- Township
- Location within the state of Minnesota Concord Township, Minnesota (the United States)
- Coordinates: 44°9′11″N 92°51′1″W
- Country: United States
- State: Minnesota
- County: Dodge

Area
  - Total: 36.9 sq mi (95.5 km^{2})
  - Land: 36.9 sq mi (95.5 km^{2})
  - Water: 0 sq mi (0.0 km^{2})
- Elevation: 1,194 ft (364 m)

Population (2000)
  - Total: 587
  - Density: 16/sq mi (6.1/km^{2})
- Time zone: UTC-6 (Central (CST))
  - Summer (DST): UTC-5 (CDT)
- ZIP code: 55985
- Area code: 507
- FIPS code: 27-12934
- GNIS feature ID: 0663861

Concord Township is a township in Dodge County, Minnesota, United States. The population was 587 at the 2000 census. The unincorporated community of Concord is located within Concord Township. The city of West Concord is located within the township geographically but is a separate entity.

Concord Township was organized in 1858. A large share of the early settlers of the area were from New England, New York, and Pennsylvania. Concord Township, as well as West Concord located within the township, were both named after Concord, New Hampshire.

== Geography ==
According to the United States Census Bureau, the township has a total area of 36.9 square miles (96 km^{2}), of which 36.9 square miles (96 km^{2}) is land and 0.03% is water.

== Demographics ==
As of the census of 2000, there were 587 people, 206 households, and 165 families residing in the township. The population density was 15.9 inhabitants per square mile (6.1/km^{2}). There were 214 housing units at an average density of 5.8 per square mile (2.2/km^{2}). The racial makeup of the township was 96.93% White, 0.34% African American, 0.17% Native American, 1.36% from other races, and 1.19% from two or more races. Hispanic or Latino of any race were 1.70% of the population.

There were 206 households, out of which 36.4% had children under the age of 18 living with them, 73.3% were married couples living together, 4.9% had a female householder with no husband present, and 19.9% were non-families. 16.5% of all households were made up of individuals, and 7.3% had someone living alone who was 65 years of age or older. The average household size was 2.82 and the average family size was 3.17.

In the township the population was spread out, with 27.1% under the age of 18, 9.0% from 18 to 24, 27.3% from 25 to 44, 22.5% from 45 to 64, and 14.1% who were 65 years of age or older. The median age was 37 years. For every 100 females, there were 105.2 males. For every 100 females age 18 and over, there were 107.8 males.

The median income for a household in the township was $45,588, and the median income for a family was $47,188. Males had a median income of $30,357 versus $22,188 for females. The per capita income for the township was $16,895. About 5.7% of families and 8.6% of the population were below the poverty line, including 12.7% of those under age 18 and none of those age 65 or over.
