= Dodge City USD 443 =

Public school district in Dodge City, Kansas

Address
- 2112 1st Ave. Dodge City, Kansas, 67801; United States
- Coordinates: 37.7579°N 100.0185°W

District information
- Type: Public
- Grades: PreK to 12
- Superintendent: Fred Dierksen (2020)
- School board: 7 members
- Schools: 14

Students and staff
- Students: 7319 (2020)

Other information
- Website: usd443.org

Dodge City USD 443, also known as Dodge City Public Schools, is a public unified school district headquartered in Dodge City, Kansas, United States. The district includes the communities of Dodge City, Fort Dodge, Wilroads Gardens, Wright, Howell, and nearby rural areas.

== Schools ==
The school district operates the following schools:

High school

- Dodge City High School (9-12)

Middle schools

- Comanche Middle School (6-8)
- Dodge City Middle School (6-8)

Elementary schools

- Bright Beginnings Early Childhood Center (Grades Pre-K)
- Beeson Elementary School (K-5)
- Central Elementary School (K-5)
- Linn Elementary School (K-5)
- Miller Elementary School (K-5)
- Northwest Elementary School (K-5)
- Ross Elementary School (K-5)
- Soule Elementary School (K-5)
- Sunnyside Elementary School (K-5)
- RISE Wilroads Gardens

Alternative schools

- Alternative Education School

== See also ==
- Kansas State Department of Education
- Kansas State High School Activities Association
- List of high schools in Kansas
- List of unified school districts in Kansas
