= Bucklin Township, Kansas =

Bucklin Township
- Township
- Location in Ford County
- Coordinates: 37°31′21″N 099°35′46″W
- Country: United States
- State: Kansas
- County: Ford

Area
  - Total: 110.12 sq mi (285.21 km^{2})
  - Land: 110.10 sq mi (285.15 km^{2})
  - Water: 0.023 sq mi (0.06 km^{2}) 0.02%
- Elevation: 2,398 ft (731 m)

Population (2020)
  - Total: 821
  - Density: 7.46/sq mi (2.88/km^{2})
- GNIS feature ID: 0470701

Bucklin Township is a township in Ford County, Kansas, United States. As of the 2020 census, its population was 821.

== Geography ==
Bucklin Township covers an area of 110.12 square miles (285.2 km^{2}) and contains one incorporated settlement, Bucklin. According to the United States Geological Survey, it contains two cemeteries: Bucklin and Pleasant Valley.

== Transportation ==
Bucklin Township contains one airport or landing strip, Bucklin Airfield.
