= Concord Township, Bureau County, Illinois =

Concord Township
- Township
- Location in Bureau County

- Bureau County's location in Illinois
- Coordinates: 41°21′59″N 89°41′12″W
- Country: United States
- State: Illinois
- County: Bureau
- Established: November 6, 1849

Area
  - Total: 36.17 sq mi (93.7 km^{2})
  - Land: 36.02 sq mi (93.3 km^{2})
  - Water: 0.15 sq mi (0.39 km^{2}) 0.41%
- Elevation: 643 ft (196 m)

Population (2020)
  - Total: 1,423
  - Density: 39.51/sq mi (15.25/km^{2})
- Time zone: UTC-6 (CST)
  - Summer (DST): UTC-5 (CDT)
- ZIP codes: 61314, 61361, 61379
- FIPS code: 17-011-16028

Concord Township is one of twenty-five townships in Bureau County, Illinois, USA. As of the 2020 census, its population was 1,423 and it contained 738 housing units.

== Geography ==
According to the 2010 census, the township has a total area of 36.17 square miles (93.7 km^{2}), of which 36.02 square miles (93.3 km^{2}) (or 99.59%) is land and 0.15 square miles (0.39 km^{2}) (or 0.41%) is water.

=== Cities ===
- Buda
- Sheffield (east three-quarters)

=== Unincorporated towns ===
- Bourbonais (historical)

=== Cemeteries ===
The township contains four cemeteries:

- Fifield
- Hopeland
- Saint Patrick
- Sheffield

=== Major highways ===
- Interstate 80
- US Route 6
- Illinois Route 40

=== Landmarks ===
- Hennepin Canal Parkway State Park
- Hidden Lake Country Club

== Demographics ==
As of the 2020 census there were 1,423 people, 647 households, and 430 families residing in the township. The population density was 39.37 inhabitants per square mile (15.20/km^{2}). There were 738 housing units at an average density of 20.42 per square mile (7.88/km^{2}). The racial makeup of the township was 94.94% White, 0.14% African American, 0.07% Native American, 0.35% Asian, 0.00% Pacific Islander, 0.91% from other races, and 3.58% from two or more races. Hispanic or Latino people of any race were 2.39% of the population.

There were 647 households, out of which 28.40% had children under the age of 18 living with them, 51.31% were married couples living together, 8.96% had a female householder with no spouse present, and 33.54% were non-families. 24.00% of all households were made up of individuals, and 9.60% had someone living alone who was 65 years of age or older. The average household size was 2.42 and the average family size was 2.80.

The township's age distribution consisted of 22.5% under the age of 18, 6.2% from 18 to 24, 23.7% from 25 to 44, 29.7% from 45 to 64, and 17.9% who were 65 years of age or older. The median age was 42.9 years. For every 100 females, there were 92.6 males. For every 100 females age 18 and over, there were 97.7 males.

The median income for a household in the township was $49,338, and the median income for a family was $66,364. Males had a median income of $45,865 versus $27,917 for females. The per capita income for the township was $25,621. About 7.9% of families and 11.3% of the population were below the poverty line, including 5.1% of those under age 18 and 7.9% of those age 65 or over.

Historical population
Census	Pop.	Note	%±
2010	1,644		—
2020	1,423		−13.4%
US Decennial Census

== School districts ==
- Bureau Valley Community Unit School District 340

== Political districts ==
- Illinois's 11th congressional district
- State House District 74
- State Senate District 37
