= Nankin Township, Michigan =

- Former civil township
- Former location within the state of Michigan Former location within the United States
- Coordinates: 42°19′00″N 83°22′00″W
- Country: United States
- State: Michigan
- County: Wayne
- Organized: 1827
- Disestablished: 1966
- Time zone: UTC-5 (Eastern (EST))
  - Summer (DST): UTC-4 (EDT)

Nankin Township is a former township of Wayne County in the U.S. state of Michigan. It was bordered on the north by Joy Road, the east by Inkster Road, the south by Van Born Road, and the west by Hannan Road.

== History ==
Three Algonquin tribes - Potawatomi, Ojibwa, and Ottawa - met each year on the middle fork of the Rouge River at the site of Nankin Mills to establish hunting territories. "Bucklin Township" was first organized in 1827, named in honor of Joseph Bucklin, who in 1772 fired a musket and severely wounded a British Royal Navy captain in the first intentional and planned attack on English military forces in the American Revolution. Bucklin Township included what are now the cities of Westland, Livonia, Garden City, Inkster, Wayne, Dearborn, Dearborn Heights and Redford Township. In 1829, it was proposed that Bucklin Township be divided into Lima and Richland. Due to name conflicts under territorial law prohibiting duplication of post office names, the bill was amended; Lima was renamed Nankin Township, after the Chinese city Nanjing, and Richland was renamed Pekin Township, after Beijing.

In 1833 Pekin was renamed Redford Township, and its southern portion was subsequently set off as Dearborn Township. In 1834 Plymouth Township's southern portion became Canton Township, named after Canton, the former English name of Guangzhou, Imperial China.

In 1835, Livonia Township (now the city of Livonia) was split off from Nankin. There was a post office called East Nankin beginning in 1857.

Garden City, Inkster, and Wayne then incorporated from land either partially or wholly within Nankin Township. The remainder of the township incorporated as the city of Westland, effective May 16, 1966. The city took its name from the recently completed Westland Center at Wayne and Warren roads, and was the fourth largest city in Wayne County when it incorporated.
