= Concord Township, Adams County, Illinois =

Township in Illinois, US

Concord Township
- Township
- Location in Adams County

- Adams County's location in Illinois
- Coordinates: 39°58′12″N 90°58′30″W
- Country: United States
- State: Illinois
- County: Adams
- Established: November 6, 1849

Area
  - Total: 37.19 sq mi (96.3 km^{2})
  - Land: 37.14 sq mi (96.2 km^{2})
  - Water: 0.05 sq mi (0.13 km^{2}) 0.13%
- Elevation: 636 ft (194 m)

Population (2020)
  - Total: 279
  - Density: 7.51/sq mi (2.90/km^{2})
- Time zone: UTC-6 (CST)
  - Summer (DST): UTC-5 (CDT)
- ZIP codes: 62320, 62324
- FIPS code: 17-001-16015

Concord Township is one of twenty-two townships in Adams County, Illinois, United States. As of the 2020 census, its population was 279 and it contained 111 housing units.

== Geography ==
According to the 2010 census, the township has a total area of 37.19 square miles (96.3 km^{2}), of which 37.14 square miles (96.2 km^{2}) (or 99.87%) is land and 0.05 square miles (0.13 km^{2}) (or 0.13%) is water.

=== Unincorporated towns ===
- Kellerville

=== Cemeteries ===
The township contains six cemeteries: Amen, Concord, Dunkard, Higley Family, Jefferson and Wallace.

== Demographics ==
As of the 2020 census there were 279 people, 122 households, and 122 families residing in the township. The population density was 7.49 inhabitants per square mile (2.89/km^{2}). There were 111 housing units at an average density of 2.98 units per square mile (1.15 units/km^{2}). The racial makeup of the township was 98.57% White, 0.00% African American, 0.00% Native American, 0.00% Asian, 0.00% Pacific Islander, 0.00% from other races, and 1.43% from two or more races. Hispanic or Latino of any race were 0.36% of the population.

There were 122 households, out of which 72.10% had children under the age of 18 living with them, 87.70% were married couples living together, none had a female householder with no spouse present, and none were non-families. No households were made up of individuals. The average household size was 4.07 and the average family size was 4.07.

The township's age distribution consisted of 42.9% under the age of 18, 5.0% from 18 to 24, 25.7% from 25 to 44, 22.3% from 45 to 64, and 4.0% who were 65 years of age or older. The median age was 28.3 years. For every 100 females, there were 218.6 males. For every 100 females age 18 and over, there were 123.6 males.

The median income for a household in the township was $55,000, and the median income for a family was $55,000. Males had a median income of $23,821 versus $13,700 for females. The per capita income for the township was $17,847. About 9.0% of families and 12.7% of the population were below the poverty line, including 19.2% of those under age 18 and 0.0% of those age 65 or over.

Historical population
Census	Pop.	Note	%±
2010	287		—
2020	279		−2.8%
U.S. Decennial Census

== School districts ==
- Central Community Unit School District 3

== Political districts ==
- Illinois' 18th congressional district
- State House District 93
- State Senate District 47
