= Ford, Kansas =

City in Ford County, Kansas

- City
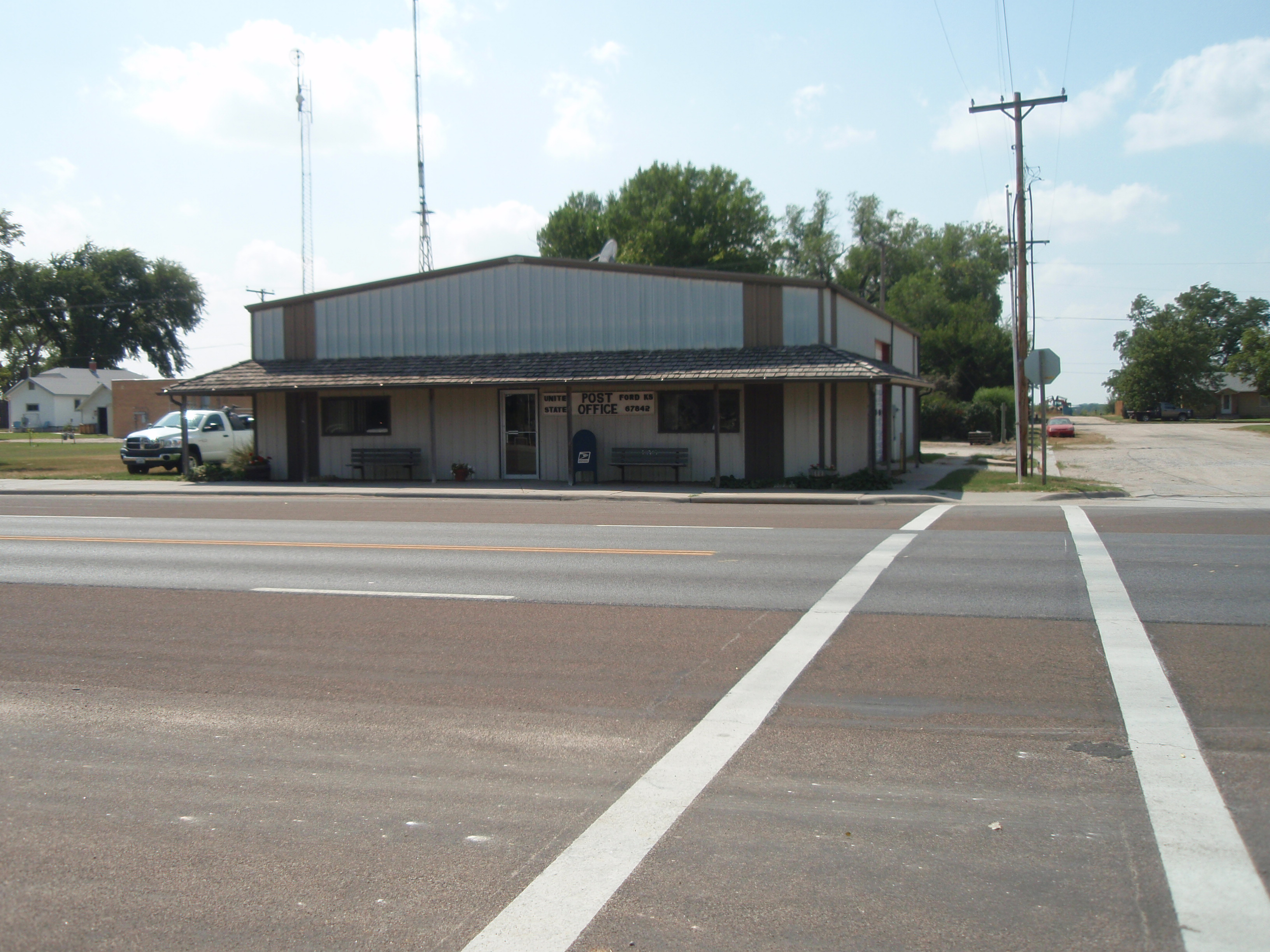
- Post office in Ford (2009)

- Location within Ford County and Kansas

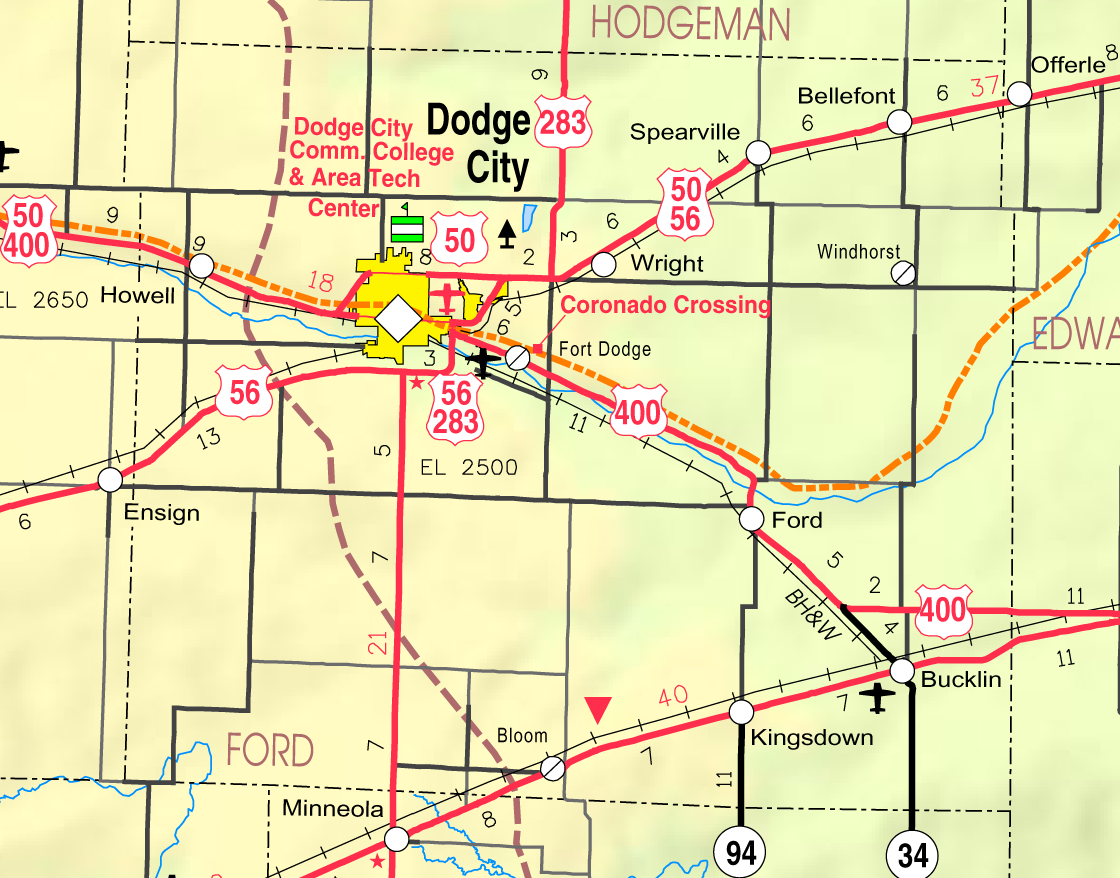
- KDOT map of Ford County (legend)
- Coordinates: 37°38′12″N 99°45′14″W
- Country: United States
- State: Kansas
- County: Ford
- Founded: 1885
- Incorporated: 1887
- Named for: Col. James Hobart Ford

Area
  - Total: 0.42 sq mi (1.10 km^{2})
  - Land: 0.42 sq mi (1.10 km^{2})
  - Water: 0 sq mi (0.00 km^{2})
- Elevation: 2,398 ft (731 m)

Population (2020)
  - Total: 203
  - Density: 478/sq mi (185/km^{2})
- Time zone: UTC-6 (CST)
  - Summer (DST): UTC-5 (CDT)
- ZIP Code: 67842
- Area code: 620
- FIPS code: 20-23725
- GNIS ID: 2394785
- Website: ford.krwa.net

Ford is a city in Ford County, Kansas, United States. As of the 2020 census, the population of the city was 203.

== History ==
Ford was founded circa 1885. It was named for Col. James Hobart Ford, a notable Union colonel and brevet brigadier general during the Civil War.

The first post office in Ford was established in February 1885.

== Geography ==
According to the United States Census Bureau, the city has a total area of 0.42 square miles (1.09 km^{2}), all land.

== Demographics ==
Historical population
Census	Pop.	Note	%±
1890	148		—
1900	82		−44.6%
1910	205		150.0%
1920	272		32.7%
1930	382		40.4%
1940	296		−22.5%
1950	244		−17.6%
1960	252		3.3%
1970	246		−2.4%
1980	272		10.6%
1990	247		−9.2%
2000	314		27.1%
2010	216		−31.2%
2020	203		−6.0%
U.S. Decennial Census

=== 2020 census ===
The 2020 United States census counted 203 people, 86 households, and 54 families in Ford. The population density was 479.9 per square mile (185.3/km^{2}). There were 115 housing units at an average density of 271.9 per square mile (105.0/km^{2}). The racial makeup was 86.7% (176) white or European American (83.74% non-Hispanic white), 0.0% (0) black or African-American, 0.99% (2) Native American or Alaska Native, 0.0% (0) Asian, 0.0% (0) Pacific Islander or Native Hawaiian, 0.0% (0) from other races, and 12.32% (25) from two or more races. Hispanic or Latino of any race was 10.34% (21) of the population.

Of the 86 households, 29.1% had children under the age of 18; 43.0% were married couples living together; 27.9% had a female householder with no spouse or partner present. 29.1% of households consisted of individuals and 17.4% had someone living alone who was 65 years of age or older. The average household size was 2.4 and the average family size was 2.9. The percent of those with a bachelor's degree or higher was estimated to be 11.3% of the population.

26.1% of the population was under the age of 18, 4.4% from 18 to 24, 28.1% from 25 to 44, 22.2% from 45 to 64, and 19.2% who were 65 years of age or older. The median age was 37.9 years. For every 100 females, there were 101.0 males. For every 100 females ages 18 and older, there were 105.5 males.

The 2016–2020 5-year American Community Survey estimates show that the median household income was $57,500 (with a margin of error of +/- $25,887) and the median family income was $70,938 (+/- $16,809). Males had a median income of $40,000 (+/- $21,183) versus $33,750 (+/- $13,201) for females. The median income for those above 16 years old was $36,563 (+/- $13,542). Approximately, 0.0% of families and 2.8% of the population were below the poverty line, including 0.0% of those under the age of 18 and 14.3% of those ages 65 or over.

=== 2010 census ===
As of the census of 2010, there were 216 people, 96 households, and 59 families residing in the city. The population density was 514.3 inhabitants per square mile (198.6/km^{2}). There were 120 housing units at an average density of 285.7 per square mile (110.3/km^{2}). The racial makeup of the city was 87.0% White, 0.5% African American, 3.7% Native American, 6.9% from other races, and 1.9% from two or more races. Hispanic or Latino of any race were 8.3% of the population.

There were 96 households, of which 25.0% had children under the age of 18 living with them, 44.8% were married couples living together, 12.5% had a female householder with no husband present, 4.2% had a male householder with no wife present, and 38.5% were non-families. 33.3% of all households were made up of individuals, and 10.5% had someone living alone who was 65 years of age or older. The average household size was 2.25 and the average family size was 2.88.

The median age in the city was 44.1 years. 20.4% of residents were under the age of 18; 6% were between the ages of 18 and 24; 26.3% were from 25 to 44; 31.5% were from 45 to 64; and 15.7% were 65 years of age or older. The gender makeup of the city was 50.0% male and 50.0% female.

== Education ==
Ford is a part of USD 459 Bucklin. The Bucklin High School mascot is Bucklin Red Aces.

Ford High School was closed in school unification. The Ford Bulldogs won the Kansas State High School boys class BB Track & Field championship in 1964 and 1966.

== Transportation ==
The Chicago, Rock Island and Pacific Railroad formerly provided mixed train service to Ford on a line between Bucklin and Dodge City until at least 1952. As of 2025, the nearest passenger rail station is located in Dodge City, where Amtrak's Southwest Chief stops once daily on a route from Chicago to Los Angeles.

== See also ==
- Santa Fe Trail
