= Ford County, Kansas =

County in Kansas, United States

- County
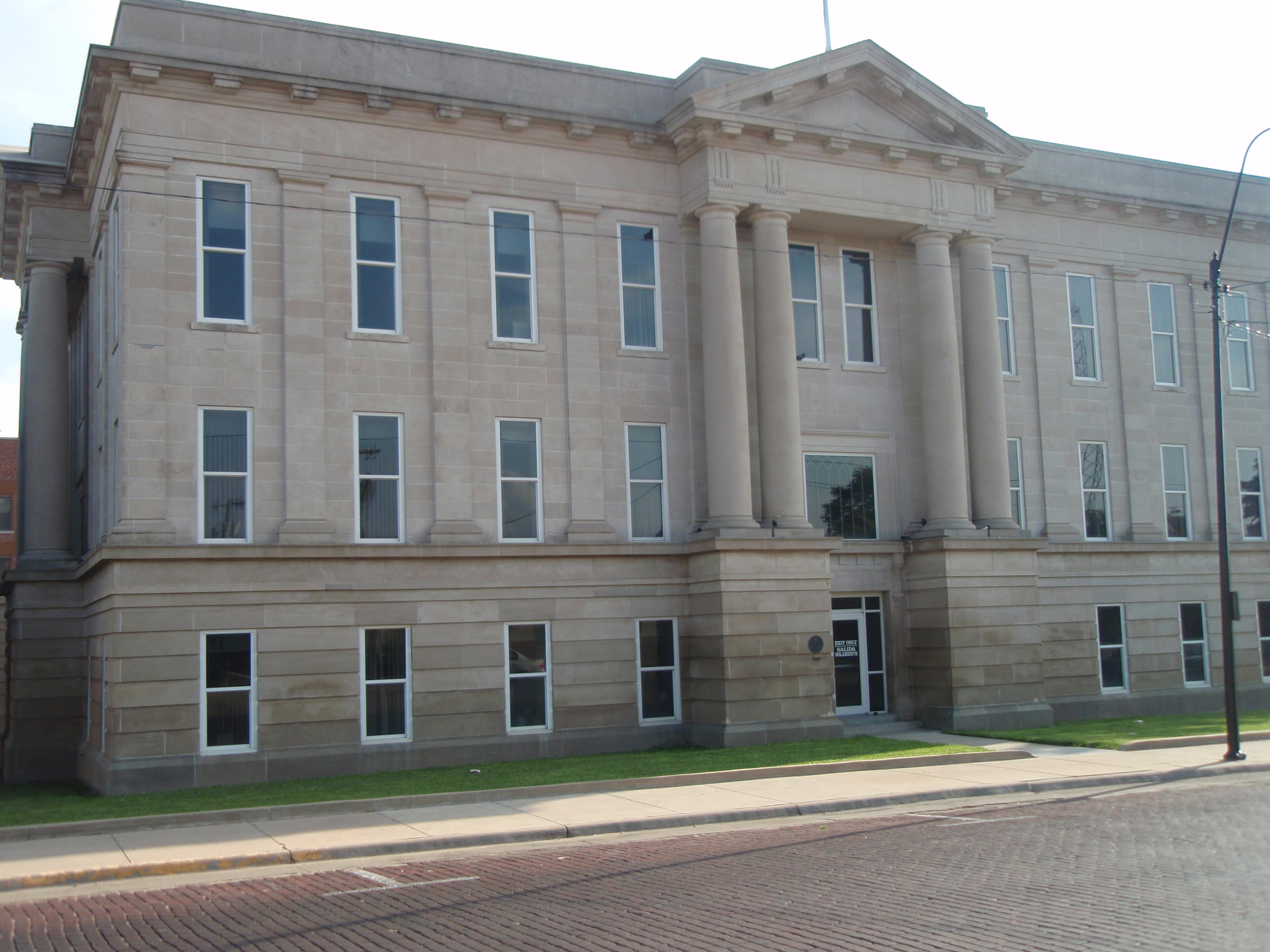
- Ford County Courthouse in Dodge City (2009)

- Location within the U.S. state of Kansas
- Coordinates: 37°42′N 99°54′W
- Country: United States
- State: Kansas
- Founded: February 26, 1867
- Named for: James Ford
- Seat: Dodge City
- Largest city: Dodge City

Area
  - Total: 1,099 sq mi (2,850 km^{2})
  - Land: 1,098 sq mi (2,840 km^{2})
  - Water: 0.8 sq mi (2.1 km^{2}) 0.07%

Population (2020)
  - Estimate (2025): 33,993 ▼
  - Density: 31.2/sq mi (12.0/km^{2})
- Time zone: UTC−6 (Central)
  - Summer (DST): UTC−5 (CDT)
- Congressional district: 1st
- Website: fordcounty.net

Ford County is a county located in the U.S. state of Kansas. Its county seat and most populous city is Dodge City. As of the 2020 census, its population was 34,287. The county was named in honor of James Ford, a brevet brigadier general during the Civil War.

== History ==
One of the earliest military posts in Kansas, Fort Atkinson, was located in Ford County. Fort Dodge, established in 1864, was on the north bank of the Arkansas River, about five miles southeast of what would become Dodge City. During the California Gold Rush in 1849, thousands of gold seekers passed through the area along the Santa Fe Trail, but few settled there.

Ford County was established in 1867 and named for Colonel James H. Ford of the Second Colorado Cavalry, who was in charge of the construction of Fort Dodge after the Civil War. The region had been frequently traveled by pioneers along the Santa Fe Trail since the early 19th century.

The town of Dodge City was established in 1872 upon the completion of the Atchison, Topeka & Santa Fe Railroad. Before the buffalo were wiped out, their hides were extensively shipped from Dodge City. Dodge City would later develop into a rough and tumble cowtown during the peak cattle drive years of 1875–1885.

== Geography ==
According to the U.S. Census Bureau, the county has a total area of 1,099 square miles (2,850 km^{2}), of which 1,098 sq mi (2,840 km^{2}) are land and 0.8 square miles (2.1 km^{2}) (0.07%) is covered by water.

=== Adjacent counties ===
- Hodgeman County (north)
- Edwards County (northeast)
- Kiowa County (east)
- Clark County (south)
- Meade County (southwest)
- Gray County (west)

=== Transit ===
- D-TRAN
- Dodge City station

=== Major highways ===
- U.S. Route 50
- U.S. Route 54
- U.S. Route 56
- U.S. Route 283
- U.S. Route 400
- K-34

== Demographics ==
Historical population
Census	Pop.	Note	%±
1870	427		—
1880	3,122		631.1%
1890	5,308		70.0%
1900	5,497		3.6%
1910	11,393		107.3%
1920	14,273		25.3%
1930	20,647		44.7%
1940	17,254		−16.4%
1950	19,670		14.0%
1960	20,938		6.4%
1970	22,587		7.9%
1980	24,315		7.7%
1990	27,463		12.9%
2000	32,458		18.2%
2010	33,848		4.3%
2020	34,287		1.3%
2025 (est.)	33,993	▼	−0.9%
U.S. Decennial Census; 1790-1960 1900-1990; 1990-2000 2010-2020

The Dodge City Micropolitan Statistical Area includes all of Ford County.

=== Racial and ethnic composition ===
Ford County, Kansas – Racial and ethnic composition Note: the US Census treats Hispanic/Latino as an ethnic category. This table excludes Latinos from the racial categories and assigns them to a separate category. Hispanics/Latinos may be of any race.
Race / Ethnicity (NH = Non-Hispanic)	Pop 1980	Pop 1990	Pop 2000	Pop 2010	Pop 2020	% 1980	% 1990	% 2000	% 2010	% 2020
White alone (NH)	22,206	22,121	18,607	14,897	12,455	91.33%	80.55%	57.33%	44.01%	36.33%
Black or African American alone (NH)	350	448	469	605	885	1.44%	1.63%	1.44%	1.79%	2.58%
Native American or Alaska Native alone (NH)	79	128	148	127	101	0.32%	0.47%	0.46%	0.38%	0.29%
Asian alone (NH)	84	649	656	470	394	0.35%	2.36%	2.02%	1.39%	1.15%
Native Hawaiian or Pacific Islander alone (NH)	x	x	34	37	6	x	x	0.10%	0.11%	0.02%
Other race alone (NH)	40	34	19	36	90	0.16%	0.12%	0.06%	0.11%	0.26%
Mixed race or Multiracial (NH)	x	x	294	355	690	x	x	0.91%	1.05%	2.01%
Hispanic or Latino (any race)	1,556	4,083	12,231	17,321	19,666	6.40%	14.87%	37.68%	51.17%	57.36%
Total	24,315	27,463	32,458	33,848	34,287	100.00%	100.00%	100.00%	100.00%	100.00%

=== 2020 census ===
As of the 2020 census, the county had a population of 34,287. The median age was 31.3 years. 31.0% of residents were under the age of 18 and 11.3% of residents were 65 years of age or older. For every 100 females there were 103.7 males, and for every 100 females age 18 and over there were 102.9 males age 18 and over. 80.8% of residents lived in urban areas, while 19.2% lived in rural areas.

The racial makeup of the county was 50.1% White, 2.9% Black or African American, 2.2% American Indian and Alaska Native, 1.2% Asian, 0.0% Native Hawaiian and Pacific Islander, 24.5% from some other race, and 19.1% from two or more races. Hispanic or Latino residents of any race comprised 57.4% of the population.

There were 11,376 households in the county, of which 42.3% had children under the age of 18 living with them and 23.4% had a female householder with no spouse or partner present. About 23.2% of all households were made up of individuals and 8.9% had someone living alone who was 65 years of age or older.

There were 12,550 housing units, of which 9.4% were vacant. Among occupied housing units, 62.0% were owner-occupied and 38.0% were renter-occupied. The homeowner vacancy rate was 1.6% and the rental vacancy rate was 10.9%.

=== 2010 census ===
As of the 2010 census, 33,848 people, 10,852 households, and 7,856 families were residing in the county. The population density was 30 people/mi^{2} (12 people/km^{2}). The 11,650 housing units averaged 11 per square mile (4.2/km^{2}).

The racial makeup of the county was 75.3% White, 2.1% African American, 1.0% Native American, 1.4% Asian, 0.2% Pacific Islander, 17.8% from other races, and 2.7% from two or more races. Hispanic and Latino Americans of any race were 51.2% of the population.

Of the 10,852 households, 40.90% had children under the age of 18 living with them, 57.90% were married couples living together, 9.20% had a female householder with no husband present, and 27.60% were not families. About 22.70% of all households were made up of individuals, and 9.50% had someone living alone who was 65 years of age or older. The average household size was 2.92, and the average family size was 3.42.

In the county, the age distribution was 31.10% under 18, 11.20% from 18 to 24, 29.40% from 25 to 44, 17.30% from 45 to 64, and 11.00% who were 65 or older. The median age was 30 years. For every 100 females, there were 107.20 males. For every 100 females age 18 and over, there were 105.30 males.

The median income for a household in the county was $37,860, and for a family was $42,734. Males had a median income of $27,189 versus $22,165 for females. The per capita income for the county was $15,721. About 9.90% of families and 12.40% of the population were below the poverty line, including 15.40% of those under age 18 and 8.40% of those age 65 or over.

== Government ==
=== Presidential elections ===
Ford County has been strongly Republican for most of its history, especially in recent elections. Only eight Democratic presidential candidates from 1880 to 2024 have carried the county, the most recent being Jimmy Carter in 1976.

Presidential election results

United States presidential election results for Ford County, Kansas
Year	Republican		Democratic		Third party(ies)	
Year	No.	%	No.	%	No.	%
1888	882	52.47%	630	37.48%	169	10.05%
1892	648	53.42%	0	0.00%	565	46.58%
1896	555	45.75%	643	53.01%	15	1.24%
1900	653	50.46%	610	47.14%	31	2.40%
1904	1,148	64.79%	526	29.68%	98	5.53%
1908	1,333	53.28%	1,089	43.53%	80	3.20%
1912	529	19.18%	1,125	40.79%	1,104	40.03%
1916	2,337	40.29%	3,044	52.47%	420	7.24%
1920	3,305	61.90%	1,879	35.19%	155	2.90%
1924	3,449	57.99%	1,551	26.08%	948	15.94%
1928	4,893	71.59%	1,870	27.36%	72	1.05%
1932	3,335	41.61%	4,442	55.42%	238	2.97%
1936	3,378	38.69%	5,335	61.11%	17	0.19%
1940	4,356	51.97%	3,954	47.17%	72	0.86%
1944	4,110	57.23%	2,994	41.69%	77	1.07%
1948	4,089	47.21%	4,396	50.75%	177	2.04%
1952	6,359	68.96%	2,748	29.80%	114	1.24%
1956	5,561	66.84%	2,710	32.57%	49	0.59%
1960	5,200	57.67%	3,792	42.05%	25	0.28%
1964	3,481	39.73%	5,221	59.59%	59	0.67%
1968	4,645	52.80%	3,191	36.27%	961	10.92%
1972	6,232	67.12%	2,804	30.20%	249	2.68%
1976	4,679	47.61%	4,934	50.21%	214	2.18%
1980	5,686	58.86%	3,194	33.06%	781	8.08%
1984	6,935	69.72%	2,914	29.30%	98	0.99%
1988	5,685	58.63%	3,817	39.36%	195	2.01%
1992	4,342	41.93%	2,635	25.44%	3,379	32.63%
1996	5,681	61.30%	2,628	28.36%	958	10.34%
2000	6,050	67.85%	2,566	28.78%	301	3.38%
2004	6,632	73.56%	2,286	25.35%	98	1.09%
2008	5,730	64.64%	2,991	33.74%	143	1.61%
2012	5,602	66.99%	2,600	31.09%	160	1.91%
2016	5,114	66.26%	2,149	27.84%	455	5.90%
2020	5,803	65.09%	2,947	33.06%	165	1.85%
2024	5,616	68.29%	2,461	29.92%	147	1.79%

=== Laws ===
Ford County was a prohibition, or "dry", county until the Kansas Constitution was amended in 1986 and voters approved the sale of alcoholic liquor by the individual drink with a 30% food sales requirement.

== Education ==
=== Colleges ===
- Dodge City Community College

=== Unified school districts ===
- Spearville USD 381
- Dodge City USD 443
- Bucklin USD 459

== Communities ==
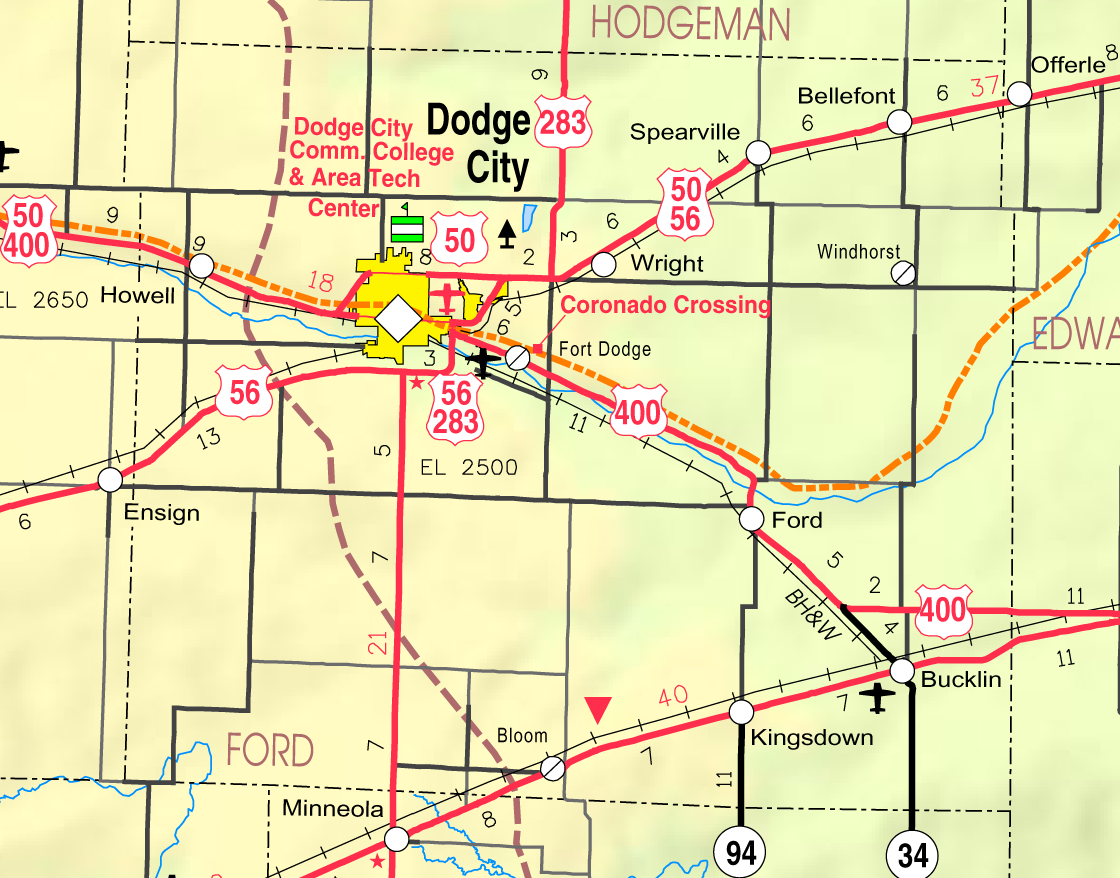
2005 map of Ford County (map legend)

List of townships / incorporated cities / unincorporated communities / extinct former communities within Ford County.

=== Cities ===
- Bucklin
- Dodge City (county seat)
- Ford
- Spearville

=== Unincorporated communities ===
† means a community is designated a Census-Designated Place (CDP) by the United States Census Bureau.

- Bellefont
- Bloom
- Fort Dodge†
- Howell
- Kingsdown
- Wilroads Gardens†
- Windhorst
- Wright†

=== Townships ===
Ford County is divided into 14 townships. The city of Dodge City is considered governmentally independent and is excluded from the census figures for the townships. In the following table, the population center is the largest city (or cities) included in that township's population total, if it is of a significant size.

Township	FIPS	Population center	Population	Population density /km^{2} (/sq mi)	Land area km^{2} (sq mi)	Water area km^{2} (sq mi)	Water %	Geographic coordinates
Bloom	07375		113	1 (2)	144 (55)	0 (0)	0%	37°30′23″N 99°55′4″W
Bucklin	09025		900	3 (8)	285 (110)	0 (0)	0.02%	37°34′44″N 99°37′9″W
Concord	15150		117	1 (2)	187 (72)	0 (0)	0.11%	37°36′36″N 100°5′52″W
Dodge	18225		899	13 (33)	70 (27)	0 (0)	0.21%	37°47′0″N 100°0′52″W
Enterprise	21450		1,113	6 (17)	175 (67)	0 (0)	0.19%	37°40′47″N 99°57′8″W
Fairview	22500		346	2 (5)	188 (73)	0 (0)	0.06%	37°45′11″N 100°8′57″W
Ford	23750		456	2 (5)	249 (96)	0 (0)	0.01%	37°36′58″N 99°46′27″W
Grandview	27350		784	3 (9)	226 (87)	0 (0)	0.20%	37°47′10″N 99°55′54″W
Richland	59300		931	9 (24)	99 (38)	0 (0)	0.17%	37°42′10″N 100°2′19″W
Royal	61575		105	1 (1)	185 (72)	0 (0)	0.06%	37°51′51″N 100°6′44″W
Sodville	66150		110	1 (2)	145 (56)	0 (0)	0.01%	37°31′16″N 99°45′6″W
Spearville	67150		1,150	2 (6)	479 (185)	0 (0)	0.03%	37°47′58″N 99°45′4″W
Wheatland	77675		170	1 (2)	193 (74)	0 (0)	0%	37°48′58″N 99°37′22″W
Wilburn	79100		88	0 (1)	187 (72)	0 (0)	0%	37°31′22″N 100°7′10″W
Sources: "Census 2000 U.S. Gazetteer Files". U.S. Census Bureau, Geography Division. Archived from the original on August 2, 2002.

== Notable people ==
Numerous figures of the American Old West lived in Dodge City during its period as a frontier cowtown. These included, most notably, lawmen Wyatt Earp and Bat Masterson, and gunfighter Doc Holliday.

== See also ==
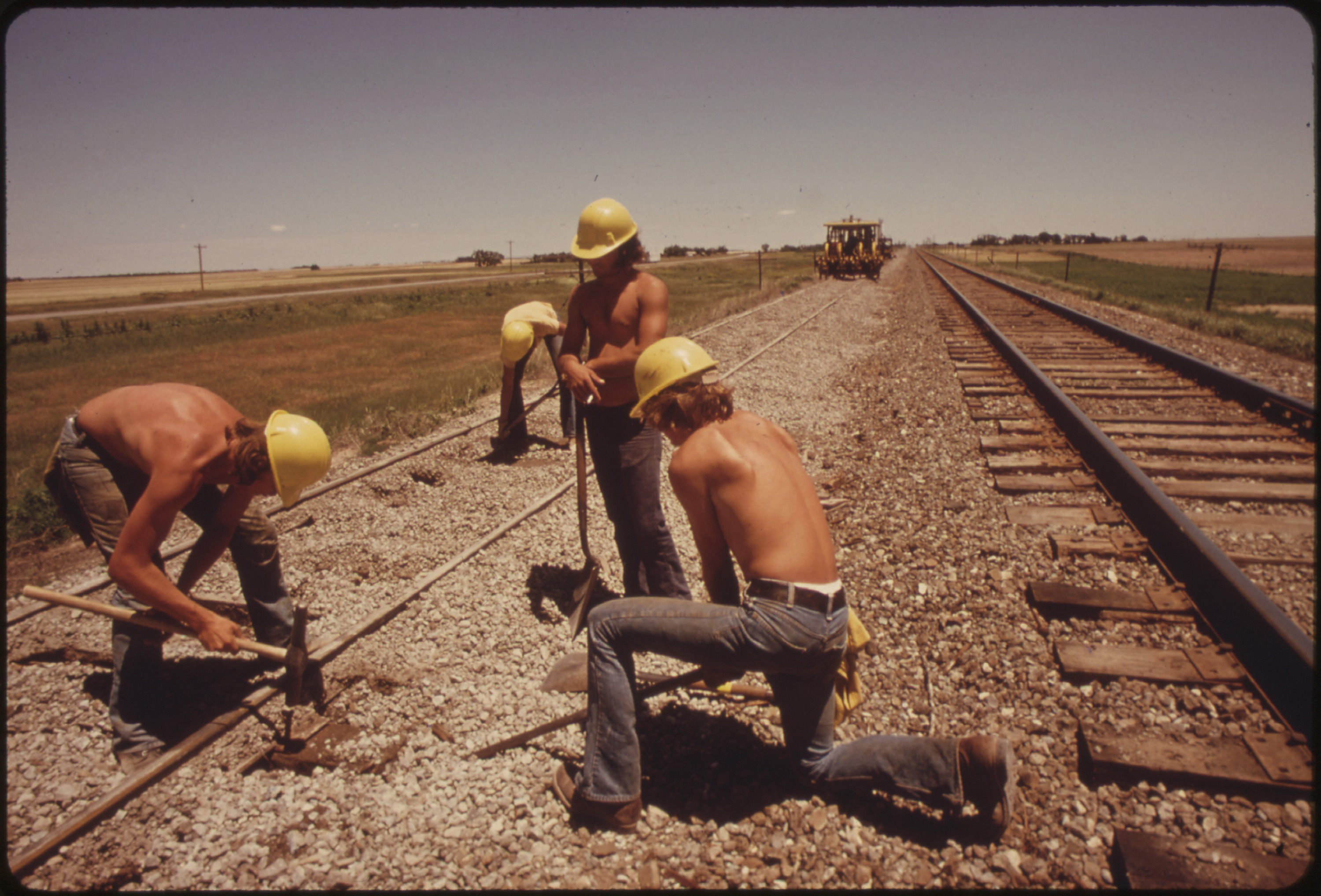
Railroad crew works on the Atchison, Topeka and Santa Fe tracks near Bellefont, 1974. Photo by Charles O'Rear.

- Golden Triangle of Meat-packing
- National Register of Historic Places listings in Ford County, Kansas

Community information for Kansas

- Kansas locations by per capita income
- List of counties in Kansas
- List of townships in Kansas
- List of cities in Kansas
- List of unincorporated communities in Kansas
- List of ghost towns in Kansas
