= Bellefont, Kansas =

Unincorporated community in Ford County, Kansas

- Unincorporated community
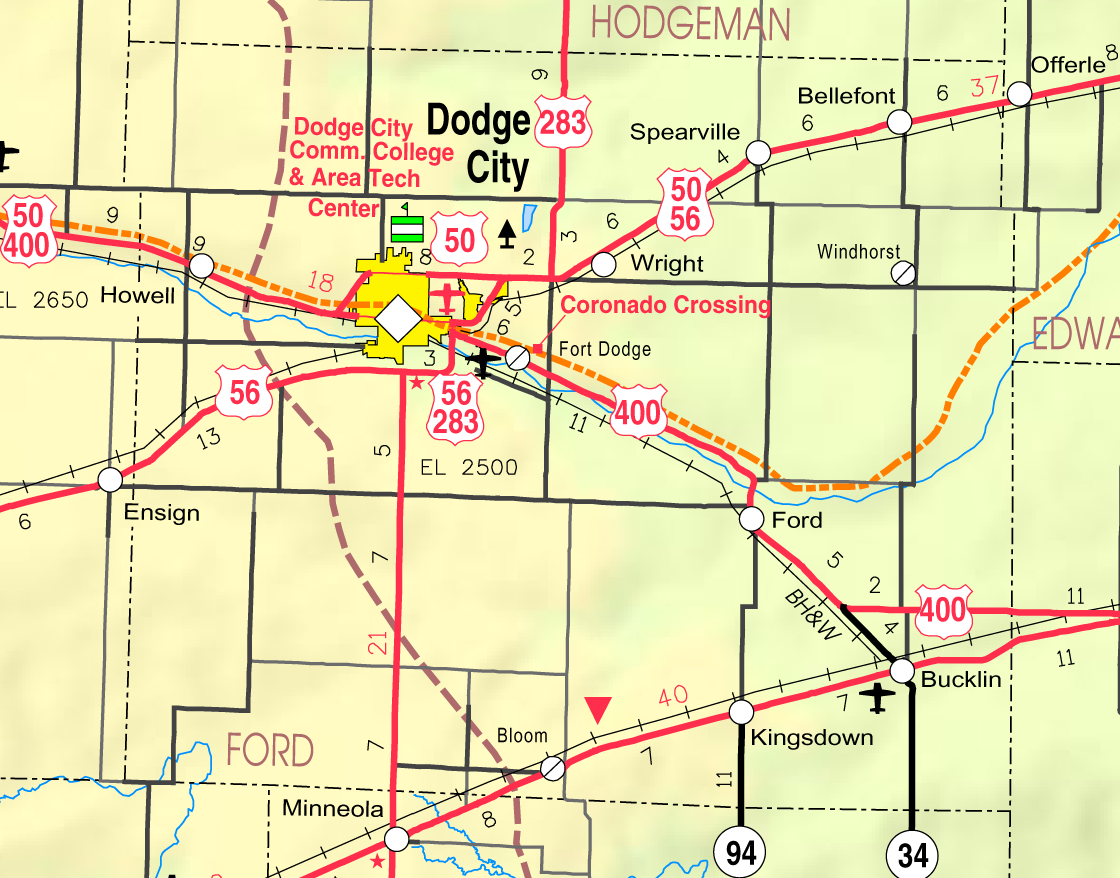
- KDOT map of Ford County (legend)

- Location within Kansas Location within the United States
- Coordinates: 37°52′21″N 99°39′28″W
- Country: United States
- State: Kansas
- County: Ford
- Founded: 1870s
- Elevation: 2,356 ft (718 m)
- Time zone: UTC-6 (CST)
  - Summer (DST): UTC-5 (CDT)
- Area code: 620
- FIPS code: 20-05450
- GNIS ID: 473745

Bellefont is an unincorporated community in Ford County, Kansas, United States. It is located along Highway 50.

== History ==
A post office in Bellefont opened in 1878, closed in 1896, reopened in 1904, and closed permanently in 1957.

== Transportation ==
The Atchison, Topeka and Santa Fe Railway formerly provided passenger rail service to Bellefont along their mainline until at least 1957. As of 2025, the nearest passenger rail station is located in Dodge City, where Amtrak's Southwest Chief stops once daily on a route from Chicago to Los Angeles.
