= Concord Township, Ford County, Kansas =

Concord Township
- Township
- Location in Ford County
- Coordinates: 37°36′22″N 100°06′24″W
- Country: United States
- State: Kansas
- County: Ford

Area
  - Total: 72.34 sq mi (187.35 km^{2})
  - Land: 72.26 sq mi (187.14 km^{2})
  - Water: 0.077 sq mi (0.2 km^{2}) 0.11%
- Elevation: 2,631 ft (802 m)

Population (2020)
  - Total: 122
  - Density: 1.69/sq mi (0.652/km^{2})
- GNIS feature ID: 0471693

Concord Township is a township in Ford County, Kansas, United States. As of the 2020 census, its population was 122.

== Geography ==
Concord Township covers an area of 72.34 square miles (187.4 km^{2}) and contains no incorporated settlements. According to the USGS, it contains one cemetery, Concord.
