= Bucklin, Kansas =

City in Ford County, Kansas

- City
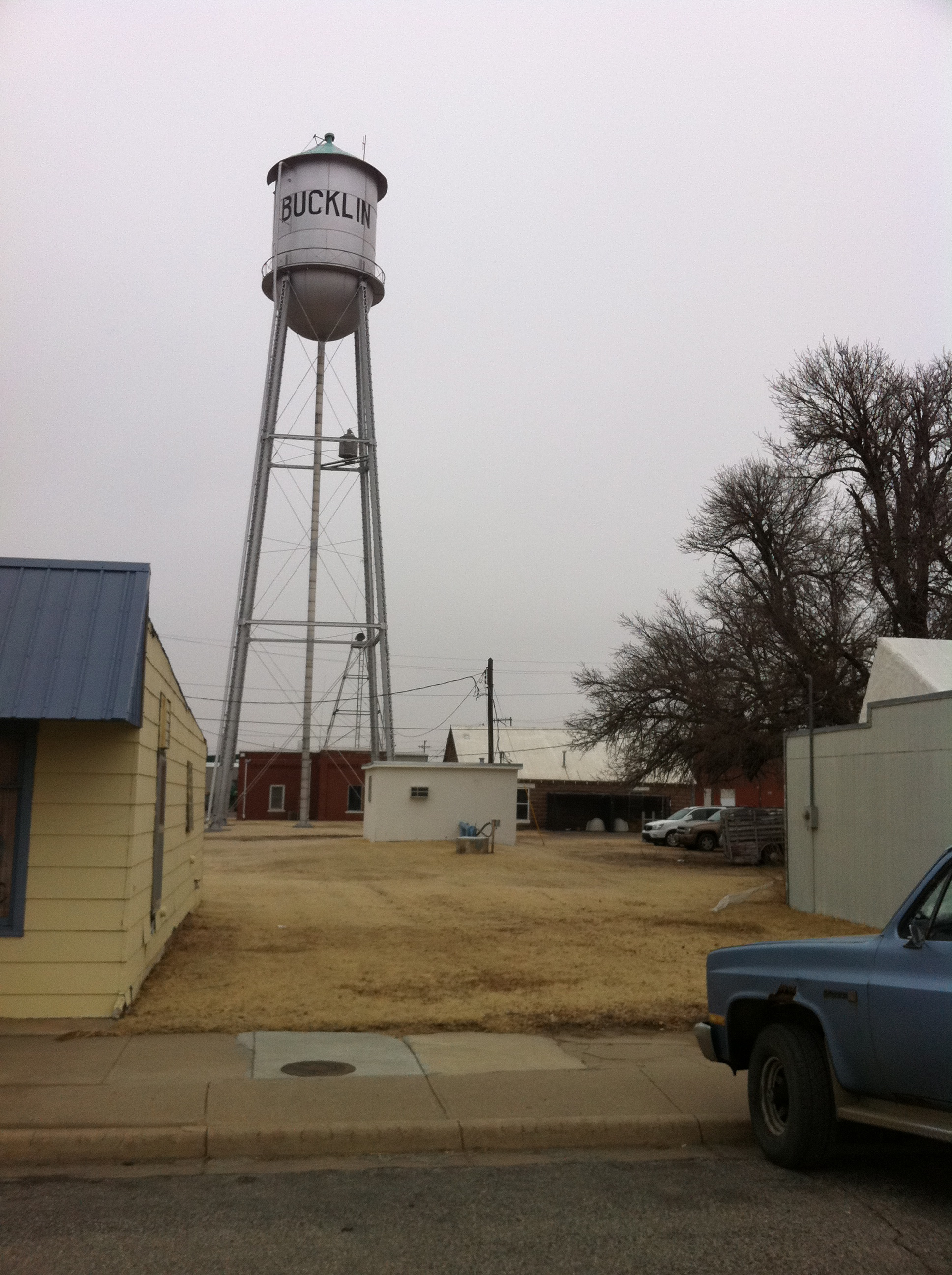
- Water tower in Bucklin (2011)

- Location within Ford County and Kansas

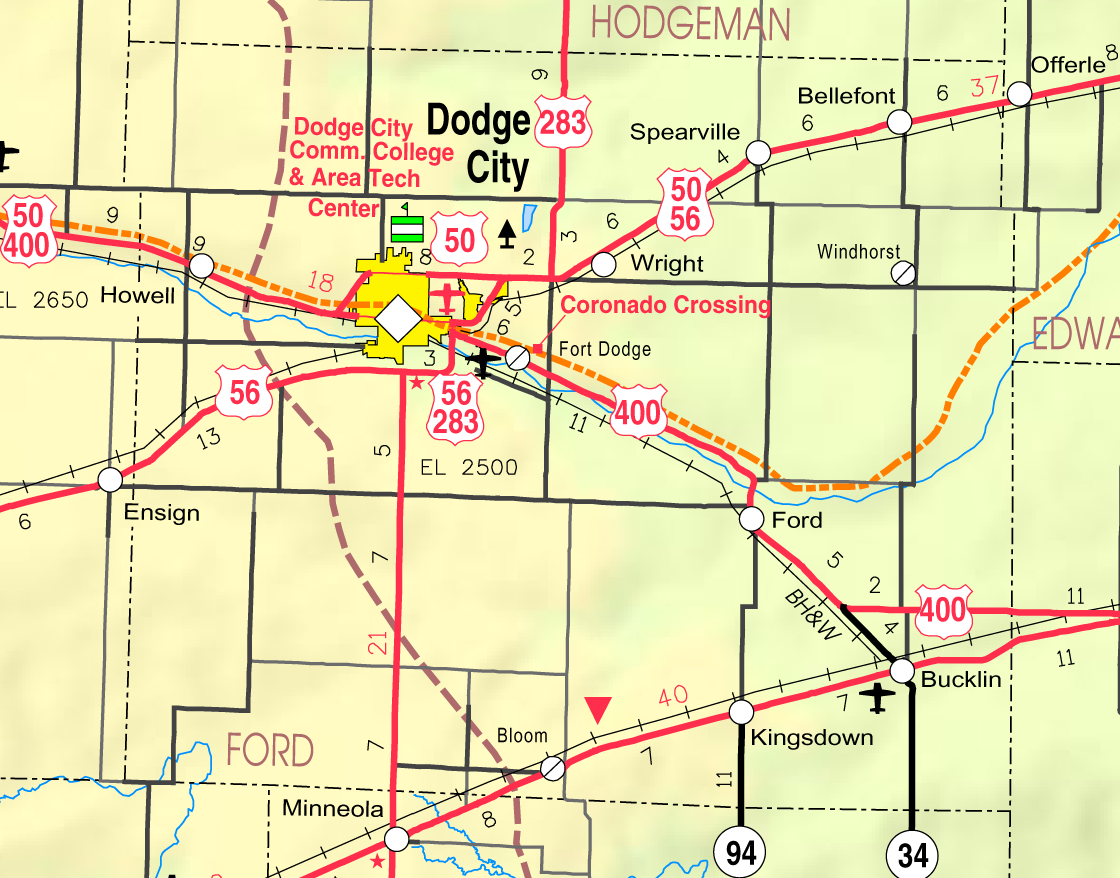
- KDOT map of Ford County (legend)
- Coordinates: 37°32′53″N 99°38′04″W
- Country: United States
- State: Kansas
- County: Ford
- Township: Bucklin
- Founded: 1880s
- Platted: 1885 (Corbitt)
- Incorporated: 1909 (Bucklin)
- Named for: Bucklin Township

Area
  - Total: 0.60 sq mi (1.56 km^{2})
  - Land: 0.58 sq mi (1.49 km^{2})
  - Water: 0.027 sq mi (0.07 km^{2})
- Elevation: 2,415 ft (736 m)

Population (2020)
  - Total: 727
  - Density: 1,260/sq mi (488/km^{2})
- Time zone: UTC-6 (CST)
  - Summer (DST): UTC-5 (CDT)
- ZIP Code: 67834
- Area code: 620
- FIPS code: 20-09000
- GNIS ID: 2393449
- Website: bucklinks.com

Bucklin is a city in Ford County, Kansas, United States. As of the 2020 census, the population of the city was 727. It is located along U.S. Route 54 highway.

== History ==
The community was originally called Corbitt when it was laid out about 1885. It was renamed Bucklin in 1887, after Bucklin Township.

Bucklin was incorporated in 1909. It was situated at the junction of two railroads.

== Geography ==
According to the United States Census Bureau, the city has a total area of 0.59 square miles (1.53 km^{2}), of which 0.56 square miles (1.45 km^{2}) is land and 0.03 square miles (0.08 km^{2}) is water.

=== Climate ===
The climate in this area is characterized by hot, humid summers and generally mild to cool winters. According to the Köppen Climate Classification system, Bucklin has a humid subtropical climate, abbreviated "Cfa" on climate maps.

== Demographics ==
Historical population
Census	Pop.	Note	%±
1910	696		—
1920	835		20.0%
1930	917		9.8%
1940	832		−9.3%
1950	824		−1.0%
1960	752		−8.7%
1970	771		2.5%
1980	786		1.9%
1990	710		−9.7%
2000	725		2.1%
2010	794		9.5%
2020	727		−8.4%
U.S. Decennial Census

=== 2020 census ===
The 2020 United States census counted 727 people, 284 households, and 188 families in Bucklin. The population density was 1,264.3 per square mile (488.2/km^{2}). There were 344 housing units at an average density of 598.3 per square mile (231.0/km^{2}). The racial makeup was 89.82% (653) white or European American (87.48% non-Hispanic white), 0.55% (4) black or African-American, 0.55% (4) Native American or Alaska Native, 0.55% (4) Asian, 0.0% (0) Pacific Islander or Native Hawaiian, 0.69% (5) from other races, and 7.84% (57) from two or more races. Hispanic or Latino of any race was 6.6% (48) of the population.

Of the 284 households, 32.4% had children under the age of 18; 51.1% were married couples living together; 21.1% had a female householder with no spouse or partner present. 28.2% of households consisted of individuals and 13.0% had someone living alone who was 65 years of age or older. The average household size was 2.1 and the average family size was 2.6. The percent of those with a bachelor's degree or higher was estimated to be 23.9% of the population.

28.7% of the population was under the age of 18, 5.5% from 18 to 24, 19.8% from 25 to 44, 25.4% from 45 to 64, and 20.5% who were 65 years of age or older. The median age was 41.3 years. For every 100 females, there were 110.7 males. For every 100 females ages 18 and older, there were 112.3 males.

The 2016–2020 5-year American Community Survey estimates show that the median household income was $54,135 (with a margin of error of +/- $7,718) and the median family income was $63,250 (+/- $10,779). Males had a median income of $42,404 (+/- $7,788) versus $28,125 (+/- $17,748) for females. The median income for those above 16 years old was $35,962 (+/- $4,743). Approximately, 3.0% of families and 6.3% of the population were below the poverty line, including 12.7% of those under the age of 18 and 8.4% of those ages 65 or over.

=== 2010 census ===
As of the census of 2010, there were 794 people, 287 households, and 204 families residing in the city. The population density was 1,417.9 inhabitants per square mile (547.5/km^{2}). There were 340 housing units at an average density of 607.1 per square mile (234.4/km^{2}). The racial makeup of the city was 93.3% White, 1.9% African American, 0.9% Native American, 0.3% Asian, 1.0% from other races, and 2.6% from two or more races. Hispanic or Latino of any race were 4.0% of the population.

There were 287 households, of which 39.0% had children under the age of 18 living with them, 56.8% were married couples living together, 10.5% had a female householder with no husband present, 3.8% had a male householder with no wife present, and 28.9% were non-families. 25.4% of all households were made up of individuals, and 11.8% had someone living alone who was 65 years of age or older. The average household size was 2.64 and the average family size was 3.17.

The median age in the city was 35 years. 30.4% of residents were under the age of 18; 6.4% were between the ages of 18 and 24; 23.4% were from 25 to 44; 22.5% were from 45 to 64; and 17.3% were 65 years of age or older. The gender makeup of the city was 49.1% male and 50.9% female.

== Education ==
The community is served by Bucklin USD 459 public school district.

The Bucklin Red Aces won the following Kansas State High School championships:

- 1966 Boys Cross Country - Class B
- 1973 Boys Track & Field - Class 1A
- 1973 Boys Track & Field (Indoor) - Class 1A
- 1980 Boys Track & Field - Class 1A

== Notable person ==
- Eddie Sutton, men's college basketball coach
