= Spearville, Kansas =

City in Ford County, Kansas

- City
- Location within Ford County and Kansas

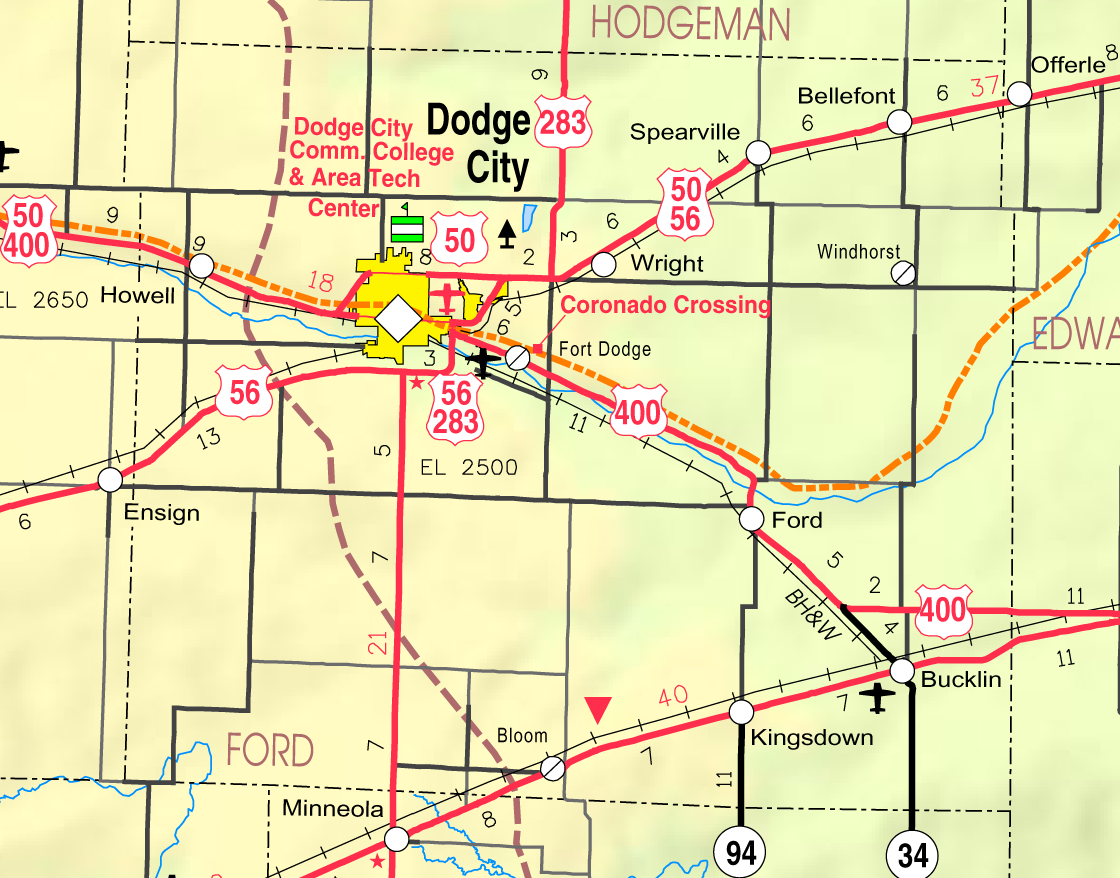
- KDOT map of Ford County (legend)
- Coordinates: 37°50′56″N 99°45′16″W
- Country: United States
- State: Kansas
- County: Ford
- Founded: 1873
- Incorporated: 1885
- Named for: Alden Speare

Area
  - Total: 0.63 sq mi (1.63 km^{2})
  - Land: 0.63 sq mi (1.63 km^{2})
  - Water: 0 sq mi (0.00 km^{2})
- Elevation: 2,457 ft (749 m)

Population (2020)
  - Total: 791
  - Density: 1,260/sq mi (485/km^{2})
- Time zone: UTC-6 (CST)
  - Summer (DST): UTC-5 (CDT)
- ZIP Code: 67876
- Area code: 620
- FIPS code: 20-67125
- GNIS ID: 2395923
- Website: City website

Spearville is a city in Ford County, Kansas, United States. As of the 2020 census, the population of the city was 791. It is located along Highway 50.

== History ==
The land for the townsite of Spearville was deeded by the Santa Fe to the Arkansas Valley Town Company in March 1873. Spearville was built on an area along a section of the Santa Fe Trail called Dry Ridge. The town was named for Alden H. Speare, railroad director and president of the town company. The city name appeared as both Spearville and Speareville until the 1890s, when local newspapers settled on the spelling of the town's name.

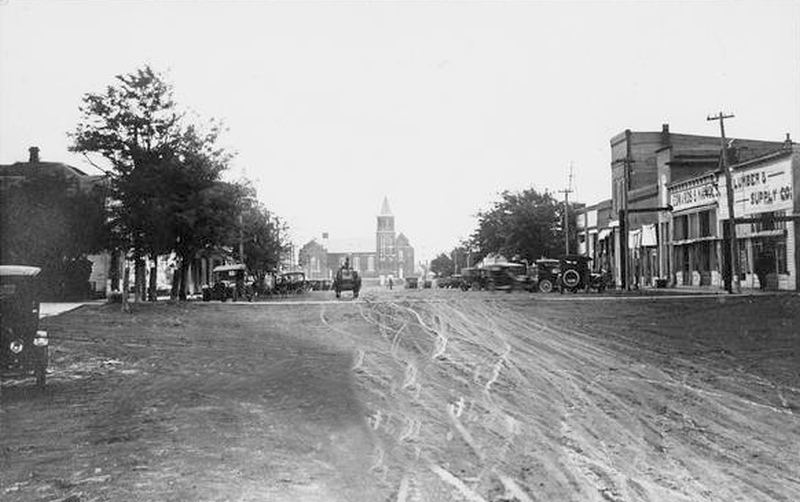
Main Street, circa 1910

Spearville's first permanent residents were the Santa Fe section foreman, Jonas Stafford, and his family, who settled in Spearville in January, 1875. Stafford's wife and daughters opened an eating house, mainly for the accommodation of the section hands.

The first post office in Spearville was established in June 1877.

Toward the end of October 1892, Spearville was the site of the second robbery of the Bill Doolin Gang, which had been formed in the aftermath of the Dalton Gang's demise in Coffeyville, Kansas. The Ford County Bank was robbed of $1,697 by Doolin and two members of his gang. One of the outlaws, Ollie (Ol) Yantis, was soon tracked down and killed by a posse.

Its nickname is City of Windmills, from the large number of windmills used to pump groundwater in the late 1800s. There are now wind farms with more than 350 turbines surrounding the city.

== Geography ==
According to the United States Census Bureau, the city has a total area of 0.60 square miles (1.55 km^{2}), all land.

=== Climate ===
The climate in this area is characterized by hot, humid summers and generally mild to cool winters. According to the Köppen Climate Classification system, Spearville has a humid subtropical climate, abbreviated "Cfa" on climate maps.

== Demographics ==
Historical population
Census	Pop.	Note	%±
1880	156		—
1900	157		—
1910	576		266.9%
1920	629		9.2%
1930	703		11.8%
1940	603		−14.2%
1950	610		1.2%
1960	602		−1.3%
1970	738		22.6%
1980	693		−6.1%
1990	716		3.3%
2000	813		13.5%
2010	773		−4.9%
2020	791		2.3%
U.S. Decennial Census

=== 2010 census ===
As of the census of 2010, there were 773 people, 300 households, and 218 families residing in the city. The population density was 1,288.3 inhabitants per square mile (497.4/km^{2}). There were 320 housing units at an average density of 533.3 per square mile (205.9/km^{2}). The racial makeup of the city was 95.5% White, 0.4% African American, 0.6% Native American, 3.4% from other races, and 0.1% from two or more races. Hispanic or Latino of any race were 8.4% of the population.

There were 300 households, of which 34.7% had children under the age of 18 living with them, 64.0% were married couples living together, 6.7% had a female householder with no husband present, 2.0% had a male householder with no wife present, and 27.3% were non-families. 26.3% of all households were made up of individuals, and 15.7% had someone living alone who was 65 years of age or older. The average household size was 2.58 and the average family size was 3.08.

The median age in the city was 39.9 years. 28.1% of residents were under the age of 18; 6.6% were between the ages of 18 and 24; 21.7% were from 25 to 44; 28% were from 45 to 64; and 15.7% were 65 years of age or older. The gender makeup of the city was 49.3% male and 50.7% female.

=== 2000 census ===
As of the census of 2000, there were 813 people, 295 households, and 202 families residing in the city. The population density was 1,282.9 inhabitants per square mile (495.3/km^{2}). There were 311 housing units at an average density of 490.7 per square mile (189.5/km^{2}). The racial makeup of the city was 97.91% White, 0.25% African American, 0.37% Native American, 0.62% from other races, and 0.86% from two or more races. Hispanic or Latino of any race were 5.04% of the population.

There were 295 households, out of which 38.0% had children under the age of 18 living with them, 62.7% were married couples living together, 3.4% had a female householder with no husband present, and 31.2% were non-families. 28.1% of all households were made up of individuals, and 18.6% had someone living alone who was 65 years of age or older. The average household size was 2.69 and the average family size was 3.34.

In the city, the population was spread out, with 31.4% under the age of 18, 5.5% from 18 to 24, 25.8% from 25 to 44, 18.8% from 45 to 64, and 18.5% who were 65 years of age or older. The median age was 36 years. For every 100 females, there were 94.5 males. For every 100 females age 18 and over, there were 93.1 males.

The median income for a household in the city was $40,625, and the median income for a family was $52,917. Males had a median income of $29,615 versus $21,875 for females. The per capita income for the city was $16,686. About 3.6% of families and 7.4% of the population were below the poverty line, including 9.2% of those under age 18 and 11.8% of those age 65 or over.

== Education ==
The community is served by Spearville USD 381 public school district.

== Transportation ==
=== Highways ===
- US-50

== Spearville Wind Energy Facility ==
The Spearville Wind Energy Facility opened in 2006, with 67 GE Energy 1.5 MW wind turbines, for a total nameplate capacity of 100.5 MW. It was the second largest wind farm in Kansas at the time it opened, behind the Gray County Wind Farm which opened in 2001. Phase I of the Smoky Hills Wind Farm edged Spearville into third place in 2008.

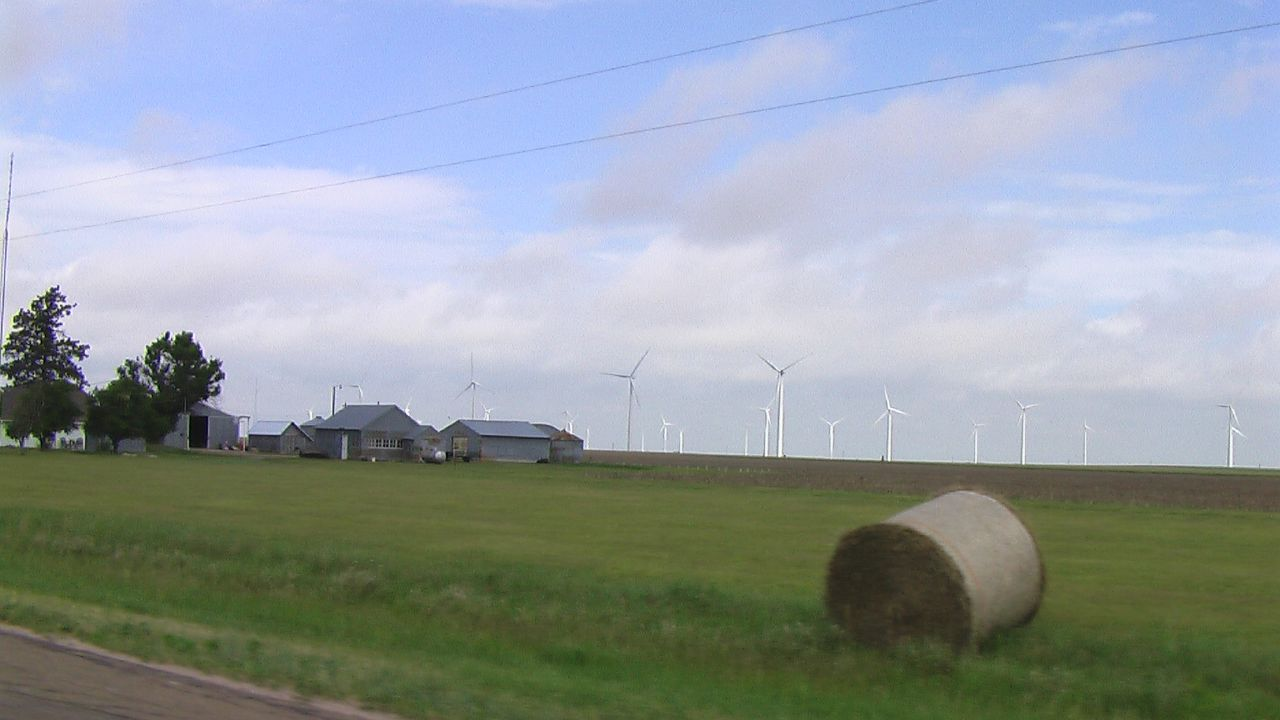

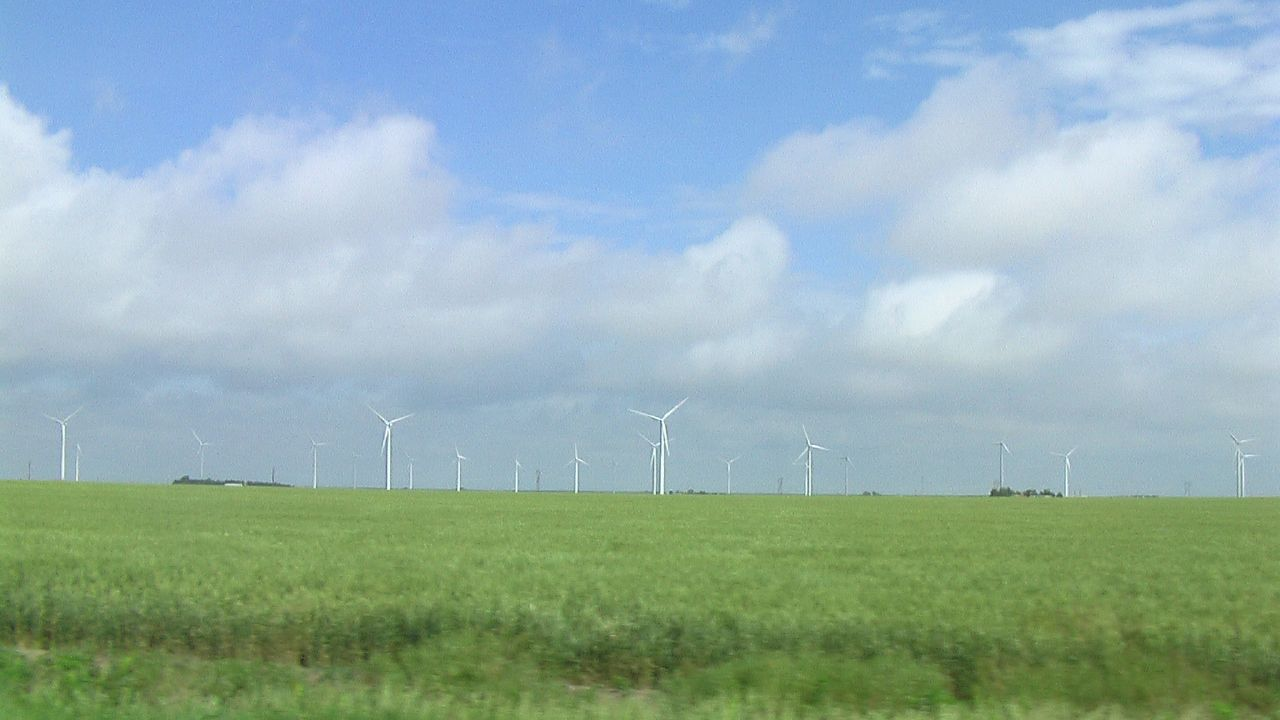

== Notable people ==
- Willie Cauley-Stein, Professional basketball player
- Rick Dvorak, American football player
- Ignatius Strecker, served as Archbishop of Kansas City, Kansas from 1969 to 1993
