= Dodge (disambiguation) =

Dodge is a brand of automobiles and trucks.

Dodge may also refer to:

== Places ==
=== United States ===
- Dodge City, Kansas, the most populous place with the name
- Dodge, Nebraska, a village
- Dodge, North Dakota, a city
- Dodge, Oklahoma, a census-designated place
- Dodge, Texas, an unincorporated community
- Dodge, Wisconsin, a town
  - Dodge (CDP), Wisconsin, an unincorporated census-designated place in the town of Dodge
- Dodge County (disambiguation)
- Dodge Township (disambiguation)
- Fort Dodge (disambiguation)
- Camp Dodge, a military installation in the city of Johnston, Iowa
- Dodge Island, an artificial island in downtown Miami, Florida
- Dodge Street, Omaha, Nebraska
- Dodge Park, North Omaha, Nebraska
- Dodge Reservoir, Lassen County, California
- Dodge (CTA station), a Chicago Transit Authority station
- Dodge Arena, Hidalgo, Texas
- Dodge House (disambiguation), various houses
- Dodge Mansion (disambiguation), two mansions
- Dodge Building, Newburyport, Massachusetts
- Dodge Site, an archaeological site in Ohio

=== Elsewhere ===
- Dodge Glacier, Greenland
- Mount Dodge, Antarctica

== People ==
- Dodge (surname)
- Dodge (given name)

== Other uses ==
- Dodge (photography), to lighten part of a photograph during printing
- Dodge (cyclecar), manufactured in Detroit, Michigan from 1914 to 1915
- DODGE (satellite) (Department of Defence Gravity Experiment), a satellite launched in 1967
- Coupe Dodge or Dodge Cup, a provincial championship in the men's and women's amateur ice hockey leagues in Quebec, Canada
- Dodge Report is a commercial construction reporting service, operated by McGraw-Hill
- Dodge T. Dog, a presenter on the CBBC channel in the United Kingdom

== See also ==
- Dodge City (disambiguation)
- Dodge Line, a policy guiding Japan's economic independence after World War II
- Dodge No. 4 State Park, Michigan
- Dodger (disambiguation)
- Doge (disambiguation)
- Evasion (disambiguation)
