= Dodge House =

Dodge House may refer to:

in the United States

(by state, then city)

- Walter L. Dodge House, West Hollywood, California, formerly listed on the National Register of Historic Places (NRHP)
- Dodge House (Mishawaka, Indiana), NRHP-listed in St. Joseph County
- Augustus Caesar Dodge House, Burlington, Iowa, listed on the NRHP in Des Moines County
- Grenville M. Dodge House, Council Bluffs, Iowa, a U.S. National Historic Landmark
- Edward Dodge House (Cambridge, Massachusetts), NRHP-listed
- Paine-Dodge House, Ipswich, Massachusetts, NRHP-listed
- Newman-Fiske-Dodge House, Wenham, Massachusetts, NRHP-listed
- Helen Dodge Three-Decker, Worcester, Massachusetts, NRHP-listed
- Dodge Mansion (Grosse Point Farms, Michigan), NRHP-listed
- Dodge Mansion (Lansing, Michigan), also known as Turner-Dodge House, NRHP-listed
- Dodge-Bailey House, Santa Fe, New Mexico, listed on the NRHP in Santa Fe County
- Mabel Dodge Luhan House, Taos, New Mexico, a U.S. National Historic Landmark
- William E. Dodge House, Bronx, New York City, NRHP-listed
- Lillian Sefton Dodge Estate, Mill Neck, New York, NRHP-listed
- Dodge-Greenleaf House, Otisville, New York, NRHP-listed
- Thomas Dodge Homestead, Port Washington, New York, NRHP-listed
- Christopher Dodge House, Providence, Rhode Island, a historic house and hotel
- Edward Dodge House (Port Washington, Wisconsin), NRHP-listed in Ozaukee County

== See also ==
- Edward Dodge House (disambiguation)
- Dodge Mansion (disambiguation)
