= Dodge (surname) =

Dodge is a surname.

== People surnamed Dodge ==
- A. Clarke Dodge (1834–1916), American politician and businessman
- Adee Dodge (1912–1993), Navajo artist, code-talker, linguist
- Augustus C. Dodge (1812–1883), Congressional delegate from Iowa Territory, U.S. Senator from Iowa
- Bayard Dodge (1888–1972), president of the Syrian Protestant College, renamed American University of Beirut, 1923–1948; son of Cleveland Hoadley Dodge, father of David S. Dodge
- Brooks Dodge (1929–2018), American alpine skier
- Carroll William Dodge (1895–1988), American mycologist and lichenologist
- Charles Dodge (disambiguation), multiple people
- Cleveland Hoadley Dodge (1860–1926), American businessman and philanthropist, grandson of William E. Dodge
- David A. Dodge, governor of the Bank of Canada 2001–2008
- David S. Dodge (1922–2009), academic administrator, long associated with the American University of Beirut
- Dustin Dodge, American politician
- Frances Dodge (1914–1971), horse breeder
- Geraldine Rockefeller Dodge (1882–1973), philanthropist, art patron, dog breeder; married to Marcellus H. Sr.
- Grenville M. Dodge (1831–1916), an army officer, railroad executive and politician
- Harold F. Dodge (1893–1976)
- Henry Dodge (1782–1867), nineteenth-century politician
- Henry Percival Dodge (1870–1936)
- Horace Elgin Dodge (1868–1920), automobile pioneer and co-founder of Dodge Brothers Motor Vehicle Company
- Jeremiah Dodge (1809–1877), Wisconsin pioneer
- Joe Dodge (1922–2004), American jazz musician
- John Dodge (disambiguation), multiple people
- Jonny Dodge (born 1982), British entrepreneur
- Joseph Dodge (1890–1964), American economist
- Joshua Eric Dodge (1854–1921), Wisconsin Supreme Court justice
- Leonora Dodge, American politician
- Marcellus Hartley Dodge Jr. (1908–1930), automobile crash victim, only child of Geraldine R. and Marcellus H. Sr.
- Marcellus Hartley Dodge Sr. (1881–1963), philanthropist, owner of the Remington Arms Company
- Mary Mapes Dodge (1831–1905)
- Mary Melissa Hoadley Dodge (1861—1934), American heiress
- Mick Dodge, reality TV star
- Quindara Oliver Dodge (1897–1978), American dietitian
- Raquel Dodge, former General Prosecutor of Brazil
- Richard Irving Dodge (1827–1895), army officer and author
- Robert K. Dodge (1928–2017), American politician
- Sue Dodge, American singer of southern gospel music
- Theodore Ayrault Dodge (1842–1909), American officer, military historian, and businessman
- Thomas Dodge, American bureaucrat
- Toby Dodge (fl. c. 2000), a British academic
- William E. Dodge (1805–1883), one of the "merchant princes of Wall Street" during the nineteenth century
- William E. Dodge Jr. (1832–1903)
- William I. Dodge (c. 1789–1873), New York politician
- Yadolah Dodge (born 1944), an Iranian and Swiss statistician

-

== United States ==
Most Dodges in the United States descend from either the brothers William and Richard Dodge of Beverly, Essex, Massachusetts and previously Somerset in England, or from the possibly unrelated Tristram Dodge of Rhode Island.

Descendants of William Dodge:

- Horace Elgin Dodge (1868–1920)
- John Francis Dodge (1864–1920)
  - Isabel Dodge Sloane (1896–1962)
  - Frances Dodge (1914–1971)
- Theodore Ayrault Dodge (1842–1909)

Descendants of Richard Dodge:

- David Low Dodge (1774–1852)
  - William E. Dodge Sr. (1805–1883)
    - William E. Dodge Jr. (1832–1903)
      - Grace Hoadley Dodge (1856–1914)
      - William Earl Dodge III (1858–1886)
      - Cleveland Hoadley Dodge (1860–1926)
        - Bayard Dodge (1888–1972)
          - David S. Dodge (1922–2009)
        - Cleveland Earl Dodge (1888–1982)
          - Cleveland E. Dodge Jr. (1922–2007)
      - Mary Melissa Hoadley Dodge (1861–1934)
    - Anson Greene Phelps Dodge (1834–1918)
    - David Stuart Dodge (1836–1921)
    - Charles Cleveland Dodge (1841–1910)
      - Charles Stuart Dodge
        - Lucie Bigelow Rosen (1890–1968)
        - Johnnie Dodge (1894–1960)
    - Norman White Dodge (1846–1907)
      - Marcellus Hartley Dodge Sr. (1881–1963)
        - Marcellus Hartley Dodge Jr. (1908–1930)
  - Elizabeth Clementine Dodge Stedman (1810–1889)
- Grenville M. Dodge (1831–1916)
- Bernard Ogilvie Dodge (1872–1960)
- Homer L. Dodge (1887–1983)
- Joshua Eric Dodge (1854–1921)

Descendants of Tristram Dodge:

- Henry Dodge (1782–1867)
  - Augustus C. Dodge (1812–1883)
- John Wood Dodge (1807–1893)
- Jeremiah Dodge (1809–1877)
- William de Leftwich Dodge (1867–1935)
- William I. Dodge (1789–1873)
- Richard Irving Dodge (1827–1895)
