= Dodger =

Dodger or Dodgers may refer to:

== Sports teams ==
=== Baseball ===
- Brooklyn Dodgers, a Major League Baseball team (1911–1957), relocated to Los Angeles
  - Cambridge Dodgers, a minor league affiliate
  - Nashua Dodgers, a farm club
  - Newport News Dodgers, a minor league affiliate
  - Greenwood Dodgers, an affiliate
  - Lamesa Dodgers, an affiliate
  - Newport Dodgers, an affiliate
  - Ponca City Dodgers, an affiliate
  - Thomasville Dodgers, an affiliate
  - Union City Dodgers, an affiliate
- Los Angeles Dodgers, a Major League Baseball team (1958–present)
  - Arizona League Dodgers, an affiliate
  - Artesia Dodgers, a former affiliate
  - Dominican Summer Dodgers, an affiliate in the Dominican Summer League
  - Green Bay Dodgers, a former affiliate
  - Lethbridge Expos, known as the Lethbridge Dodgers while affiliated with the Los Angeles team
  - Medford Dodgers, a former affiliate
  - Odessa Dodgers, a former affiliate
  - Oklahoma City Dodgers, current Triple-A affiliate in the Pacific Coast League
  - Omaha Dodgers, a former affiliate
  - Orangeburg Dodgers, a former affiliate
  - Salisbury Dodgers a former affiliate
  - Vero Beach Devil Rays, formerly Dodgers, a former affiliate
  - Waterbury Dodgers, a former affiliate

Former minor league affiliates of both Major League teams:

- Danville Dodgers
- Kokomo Dodgers
- Macon Dodgers
- Pueblo Dodgers
- Santa Barbara Dodgers

Other:

- Hornell Dodgers, a collegiate summer team in the New York Collegiate Baseball League
- Jamestown Dodgers, in the New York-Penn League (1966)
- Kingston Dodgers, in the North Atlantic League (1947)
- Leesburg Dodgers, in the Florida State League (1949)
- Oshawa Dodgers, an independent minor league team based in Ontario, Canada (2002-2009)

=== Basketball ===
- Brooklyn Dodgers (basketball), in the Eastern Basketball Association (1977-1978)

=== American football ===
- Brooklyn Dodgers (AAFC), in the All-America Football Conference (1946-1948)
- Brooklyn Dodgers (Continental Football League) (1966)
- Brooklyn Dodgers (NFL) (1930-1943)

=== Hockey ===
- Weston Dodgers, a defunct junior "A" hockey team in Ontario, Canada

== Fictional characters ==
- The Artful Dodger, in the 1838 Charles Dickens novel Oliver Twist
- Dodger, the eponymous hero of the 2012 Terry Pratchett novel Dodger
- Dodger, a dog in the Disney film Oliver & Company
- Duck Dodgers, a cartoon parody of Buck Rogers and Flash Gordon, "played" by Daffy Duck
- Roger the Dodger, in the British comic strip The Beano
- Dodger Savage, from the British teen soap opera Hollyoaks
- Dodger (comics), a fictional character from DC Comics

== Personal nicknames ==
- Dodger Whysall (1887–1930), English cricketer
- "Dodger", an alias used by American video game designer and writer Michael Stout (born 1980)

== Boats ==
- USS Dodger II (SP-46), a United States Navy patrol boat
- Dodger (sailing), a sailboat part

== Other uses ==
- Dodger (novel), by Terry Pratchett
- "Dodger" (Arrow), a television episode
- Dodger (TV series), British children's television series, inspired by the Artful Dodger
- The Dodger (film) – 1971 Greek film

== See also ==
- Draft dodger, someone who tries to avoid being drafted into the military
- Dodger Dog, a hot dog named after the Los Angeles Dodgers
- The Dodger Song, folk song
- Artful Dodger (disambiguation)
- Jammie Dodgers, a brand of biscuits
