= Edward Dodge House =

Edward Dodge House may refer to:

- Edward Dodge House (Cambridge, Massachusetts), listed on the National Register of Historic Places in Middlesex County, Massachusetts
- Edward Dodge House (Port Washington, Wisconsin), listed on the National Register of Historic Places in Ozaukee County, Wisconsin

== See also ==
- Dodge House (disambiguation)
