= USS Navajo III =

Patrol vessel of the United States Navy

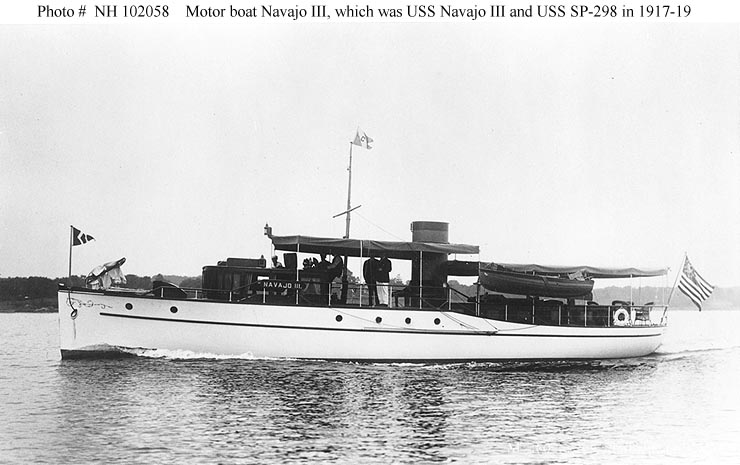
- Navajo III as a private motorboat in 1916 or 1917, prior to her U.S. Navy service.

History

United States
- Name: USS Navajo III
- Namesake: As Navajo III, the Navajo, a Native American people of the southwestern United States (previous name retained); SP-298 was her section patrol number
- Builder: Gas Engine and Power Company and Charles L. Seabury and Company, Morris Heights, the Bronx, New York
- Completed: 1916
- Acquired: 25 June 1917
- Commissioned: 25 June 1917
- Decommissioned: 1919
- Stricken: 27 September 1919
- Fate: Sold 1 November 1919
- Notes: Served as civilian motorboat Navajo III 1916-1917

General characteristics
- Type: Patrol vessel
- Displacement: 40 tons
- Length: 67 ft (20 m)
- Beam: 13 ft (4.0 m)
- Draft: 3 ft (0.91 m)
- Speed: 14 knots
- Armament: 2 × 1-pounder guns; 2 × .30-caliber (7.62-millimeter) machine guns

USS Navajo III (SP-298), later USS SP-298, was an armed motorboat that served in the United States Navy as a patrol vessel from 1917 to 1919.

Navajo III was built as a civilian motorboat of the same name in 1916 by the Gas Engine and Power Company and Charles L. Seabury and Company at Morris Heights in the Bronx, New York. The U.S. Navy acquired her for World War I service as a patrol vessel from her owner, Arthur Clapp, on 25 June 1917 and commissioned her the same day as USS Navajo III (SP-298) at the New York Navy Yard at Brooklyn, New York.

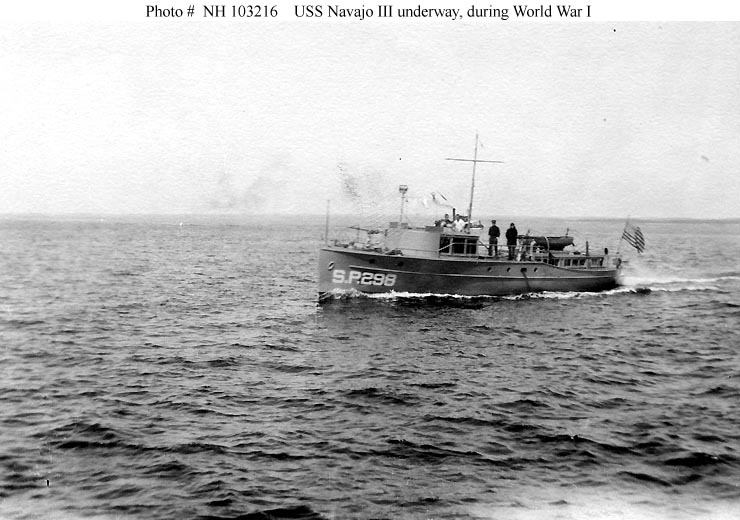
USS Navajo III, perhaps already renamed USS SP-298, sometime in 1917 or 1918.

Assigned to the 3rd Naval District, headquartered at New York City, during World War I, Navajo III steamed to Fort Lafayette in New York Harbor on 27 June 1917 and then to New Haven, Connecticut, to patrol the submarine net zone of Long Island Sound. On 5 August 1917, the patrol boat USS Abalone (SP-208) towed her up the Quinnipiac River, and thereafter Navajo III operated around Comfield, Connecticut, with the patrol boats USS Dodger II (SP-46), USS Siwash (SP-12), and USS Marie (SP-100). After moving to Smithtown Bay for target practice in November 1917, she proceeded to Marine Basin in New York City, remaining there until April 1918, when she was renamed USS SP-298.

In 1918, SP-298 was attached to Squadron 6, headquartered at Bridgeport, Connecticut, and patrolled the entrance to Bridgeport Harbor, shifting to patrol between Penfield Reef and Stratford Shoal in June 1918. She continued patrol duty off Connecticut through the end of World War I.

SP-298 was decommissioned in 1919. She was stricken from the Navy List on 27 September 1919 and sold on 1 November 1919.
