= Brom =

Brom may refer to:

== People ==
- Cor Brom (1932–2008), Dutch footballer
- Gerald Brom (born 1965), American fantasy artist and author
- Gustav Brom (1921–1995), Czech band leader
- David Brom (born 1971), American murderer
- Robert Brom (1938-2022), American Roman Catholic bishop
- Martin D. Brom (1880–1954), American politician
- Walter Brom (1921–1968), Polish football goalkeeper

== Botany ==
- Brom (grape), another name for the French wine grape Aramon blanc which is a color mutation of Aramon noir
- Brom, the abbreviation for the orchid genus Bromheadia
- Brom, a short name for bromeliads, plants in the botanical family Bromeliaceae

== Fictional characters ==
- Brom, a character in the Inheritance Cycle fantasy series
- Brom Bones, a character from The Legend of Sleepy Hollow and the movie adaptation The Adventures of Ichabod and Mr. Toad
- Brom Garret, a character in the HBO TV series Deadwood
- Brom Titus, a character in the television series Star Wars Rebels

== See also ==
- Bromine, a chemical element
- West Brom (disambiguation)
