= Abalone (disambiguation) =

Abalone is a common name for any of a group of small to very large sea snails, marine gastropod molluscs in the family Haliotidae.

Abalone may also refer to:

- Abalone (board game), an abstract board game
- USS Abalone (SP-208), a U.S Navy patrol boat during World War I
- Abalone (molecular mechanics), graphics software

== See also ==
- Haliotis, the genus containing abalone
- Nacre, or mother of pearl, an organic-inorganic composite material produced by abalone
- Abalone Alliance, an American non-violent civil disobedience group 1977–1985
- Abelone, a synonym for the grape variety Chasselas
