= ZDNET =

Business technology news website

- Website type: News website
- Available in: English, Japanese, French, Korean, German
- Headquarters: New York, USA
- Owner: Ziff Davis
- Editor: Kerry Wan
- Website: zdnet.com
- Registration: Optional
- Users: 36 million monthly
- Launched: April 1, 1991; 35 years ago (subscription service); 1994; 32 years ago (website)

ZDNET is a business technology news website owned and operated by Ziff Davis, which originally founded the brand on April 1, 1991, as its general interest technology portal. It eventually evolved into an enterprise IT-focused online publication. After being under the ownership of CNET Networks (2000–2008), CBS Corporation/ViacomCBS (2008–2020), and Red Ventures (2020–2024), ZDNET was reacquired by Ziff Davis in August 2024. CNET was included in the acquisition as well.

== History ==
=== Beginnings: 1991–1995 ===
ZDNET began as a subscription-based digital service called "ZiffNet" that offered computing information to users of CompuServe. It featured computer industry forums, events, features and searchable archives.

Initially, ZiffNet was intended to serve as a common place to find content from all Ziff-Davis print publications. As such, ZiffNet was an expansion on an earlier online service called PCMagNet for readers of PC Magazine. Launched in 1988, PCMagNet in turn was the evolution of Ziff Davis' first electronic publishing venture, a bulletin board, which launched in 1985.

In late 1994, Ziff-Davis expanded onto the World Wide Web under the name "ZD Net". Dan Farber, former editor-in-chief of PC Week and MacWeek, was named editor-in-chief of the property. By June 1995, the site was recording web traffic of 2.5 million pageviews per week.

On June 20, 1995, Ziff-Davis announced the consolidation of its online information services under a single name, ZD Net. The service had grown its membership to 275,000 subscribers across six platforms: CompuServe, Prodigy, AT&T Interchange, The Microsoft Network, AppleLink and eWorld.

=== Early history: 1995–2000 ===
By its fifth anniversary in 1996, the collective "ZD Net" brand—now on the Web, America Online, Microsoft Network and Prodigy—counted 300,000 subscribers and was named the second-highest grossing advertising site on the web. The site also expanded overseas: initially to France, Germany and the United Kingdom; later to China, Australia, Hong Kong, Italy, Korea, Malaysia, Russia, Spain, Taiwan and India.

In 1997, the website—now the brand's flagship property—underwent another redesign that featured topical "channels" of content. It also marked the change in name from "ZD Net" to "ZDNet".

==== ZDNET News ====
Two months prior, the company launched ZDNet News, or "ZDNN", the site's first dedicated section to original reportage. Among the journalists hired to staff the department were former Computer Shopper executive editor Charlie Cooper, San Jose Mercury News business editor Steve Hamm, PC Week Inside senior editor Bill Snyder, PC Week editor John Dodge, Computerworld editor Michael Fitzgerald and PC Week editorial director Jim Louderback.

In 1996, the first dedicated advertising sales team began with the hiring of Ken Evans, formerly a CMP Media executive in New York, as Senior Director of Advertising Sales. The appointment of digital publishing executive Dan Rosensweig as ZDNet's first president capped a year of significant change for the brand.

In 1998, ZDNet launched "Inter@active Investor", or ZDII, a spin-off website for investors that offered financial news and information on technology companies.

==== ZDTV ====
On May 11, 1998, Ziff-Davis launched ZDTV as the first cable television channel and website to offer 24-hour programming about computing and the Internet. The venture, which was partly owned by Vulcan Enterprises, was supported with a staff of 170 and incorporated ZDNet content on its website, ZDTV.com. The channel would later become Tech TV.

By the end of 1998, ZDNet was the dominant technology brand online. It led its closest rival, CNET, by a 26 percent margin and was the 13th most popular site on the Web, reaching 8.4 million users, or 13.4 percent of all users on the Web. The site would reach an additional 600,000 users within a year.

==== ZDNET the company ====
In 1999, Ziff-Davis spun ZDNet off as a separate company and offered it as a tracking stock, ZDZ, to accompany the parent stock, ZD. An initial public offering raised $190 million, but the tracking stock was eliminated in early 2000 and revived as common stock. The new company soon acquired Updates.com, a software upgrade service. It was incorporated into the site's "Help Channel."

==== Consumer expansion ====
In 1999, ZDNet also launched "Tech Life", a network of six consumer-focused tech sites intended to attract parents ("FamilyPC"), music listeners ("ZDNet Music"), gadget enthusiasts ("ZDNet Equip"), gamers ("ZDNet GameSpot") and basic users ("Internet Life" with Yahoo).

It also launched "Computer Stew", a web-based comedy show about technology that featured John Hargrave and Jay Stevens, as well as the first ZDNet Holiday Gift Guide.

On December 30, 1999, ZDNet launched a $25 million branding campaign in response to a $100 million advertising campaign launched by rival CNET.

ZDNet's lead over the competition narrowed by 2000. Despite a record 10.7 million unique users in January, it managed only a 13 percent lead over the next competitor. By mid-2000, ZDNet had expanded to 23 countries in 14 languages on six continents.

=== The CNET years: 2000–2007 ===
On July 19, 2000 CNET Networks (ZDNet's largest rival) announced that it would acquire ZDNET for about $1.6 billion. Some analysts thought that the merger of CNET and ZDNET would lead to redundancy in their product offerings, but research revealed that their target audiences had just 25 percent overlap.

In 2001, Ziff Davis Media Inc. reached an agreement with CNET Networks Inc. and ZDNET to regain the URLs lost in the 2000 sale of Ziff Davis Inc, to Softbank Corp.

In 2002, CNET Networks launched ZDNET sister site Builder.com, a site intended for enterprise software developers. On July 7, 2002, CNET Networks acquired Newmediary for its database of more than 30,000 enterprise IT white papers. ZDNET had integrated its services into its "Business & Technology" channel as early as January 2001.

==== Realignment ====
In 2003, CNET Networks redesigned and relaunched ZDNet as an enterprise-focused publication intended to help business executives make better technology decisions.

The entire site was realigned as part of a CNET Networks B2B portfolio that included CNET News.com, Builder.com and TechRepublic.

A "Tech Update" section was created to serve as a directory of proprietary IT research (dubbed "IT Priorities"), and a new "Power Center" was implemented to prominently feature webcasts, white papers and case studies from partners. ZDNet also offered eight enterprise-targeted newsletters, as well launched its first blogs.

In 2005, ZDNet Government was launched. Editorial features included writing by former Utah CIO Phil Windley, TechRepublic columnist Ramon Padilla and CNET News reporter Declan McCullagh. ZDNet also launched its first original podcasts in 2005.

==== ZDNET Blogs ====
In 2006, ZDNET experienced another redesign that reduced its editorial focus on traditional news articles and product reviews and emphasized a growing network of expert bloggers, now totaling more than 30. The blogs covered topics such as enterprise IT, open source, Web 2.0, Google, Apple and Microsoft, and featured journalists David Berlind, Mary Jo Foley and Larry Dignan.

On February 19, 2008, Larry Dignan was appointed editor-in-chief of ZDNet and editorial director of TechRepublic, replacing Dan Farber, who became editor-in-chief of CNET News.com.

=== The CBS years: 2008–2020 ===
On May 17, 2008, CBS Corporation announced that it would acquire CNET Networks for approximately $1.8 billion. The entire company would be organized under its CBS Interactive division.

In May 2010, ZDNet redesigned its site to place emphasis on the topics its blog network covers—now "Companies," "Hardware," "Software," "Mobile," "Security" and "Research"—and de-emphasize the downloads and reviews it imported from CNET post-merger.

=== Red Ventures: 2020–2024 ===
After the CBS Corporation merged with Viacom to form ViacomCBS in 2019, ZDNet was sold to Red Ventures in September 2020. On August 17, 2022, ZDNet announced "the biggest upgrade in the 31-year history of the brand, including a new hand-drawn logo and new brand color, 'Energy Yellow'", in anticipation of "a wave of technology advances to sweep the world's biggest industries in the years ahead." In March 2023, ZDNet was affected by layoffs that cut 35% of its staff. In August 2024, Ziff Davis signed a deal to purchase CNET and ZDNet from Red Ventures. The deal completed later in 2024, bringing ZDNET back under the ownership of Ziff Davis for the first time since it was acquired by CNET Networks in 2000.

== Content ==
ZDNet operates a network of about 50 blogs loosely aligned by its major verticals: companies, hardware, software, mobile, security and IT research. Within those general areas are blogs on gadgets, management strategy, social media, datacenters, technology law, SOA, healthcare, CRM, virtualization and sustainability. The site also offers product reviews on consumer gadgets, electronics and home office equipment.

== Awards and recognition ==
At the 14th Annual Computer Press Awards in 1999, ZDNet was adjudged the Best Overall Online Site.

In 2007, the Association of Online Publishers awarded ZDNet UK under the Business Website category for its contribution to innovation in incorporating Web 2.0 and community features effectively on its site.

== International editions ==
=== ZDNET Japan ===
A Japanese news publishing company called Asahi Interactive owns the ZDNet Japan website.

=== ZDNET UK ===
The ZDNet UK Live feature displays real time news updates and comments on the website and on social media including Twitter.

=== Other editions ===
Other country editions include Australia, Asia, Belgium, China, Germany, Netherlands, UK and France, in their native languages.

== See also ==
- The Register
