= John Dodge =

John Dodge may refer to:

- John Wood Dodge (1807–1893), American painter.
- John Francis Dodge (1864–1920), American automobile pioneer
- John Dodge (baseball) (1889–1916), American third baseman in Major League Baseball
- Johnnie Dodge (1894–1960), British Army officer of both world wars and Great Escaper
- John Dodge (editor), American freelance writer and social media consultant
- John Dodge (harness racing) (1866–1940), American horse breeder and harness racing driver
- John Dodge (paediatrician) (1933–2022), British consultant
