= Brooklyn Dodgers (disambiguation) =

The Brooklyn Dodgers were a major league baseball club active between 1884 and 1957.

Brooklyn Dodgers may also refer to:

- Brooklyn Dodgers (NFL), an American football team in the National Football League (1930–1943), renamed Brooklyn Tigers in 1944
- Brooklyn Dodgers (AAFC), an American football team in the All-America Football Conference (1946–1948)
- Brooklyn Dodgers (Continental Football League), an American football team in the Continental Football League for only one year (1966)
- Brooklyn Dodgers (basketball), a team in the Eastern Basketball Association
- Brooklyn Italians, a soccer team formerly known as the Brooklyn Dodgers
