= Sacred Heart-Saint Wenceslaus Church =

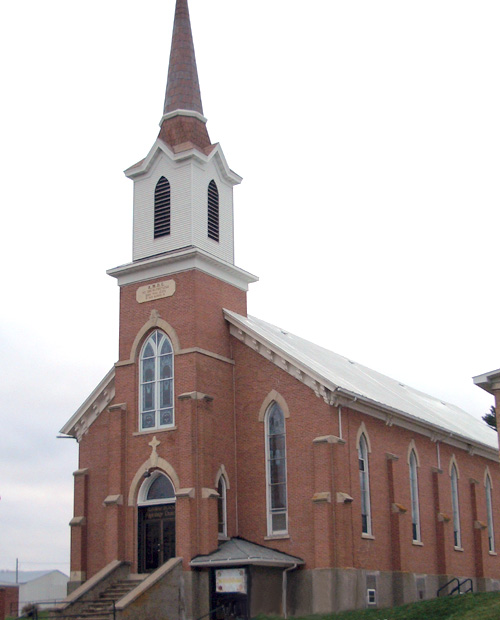
- Sacred Heart-Saint Wenceslaus Church
- 44°8′4″N 91°31′37″W
- Location: Pine Creek, Wisconsin
- Country: United States
- Denomination: Roman Catholic

Architecture
- Architect: C.G. Maybury (1830–1917)

Sacred Heart-Saint Wenceslaus Church in Pine Creek, Wisconsin, referred to in Polish as Kościół Najświętszego Serca Pana Jezusa i Świętego Wacława, is a historic church of the Roman Catholic Diocese of La Crosse. It is known simply as Sacred Heart.

== History of Sacred Heart-Saint Wenceslaus Parish ==
The congregation dates back to 1862, when the Kaszubian Polish and the Bohemian families settling in Pine Creek united to practice their faith in the absence of any nearby Roman Catholic parish. On February 7, 1864, a parish was formally established and dedicated to Saint Wenceslaus, in honor of the parish's Bohemian contingent. Despite the Bohemian name, the parish was predominantly Polish and was served by Polish-speaking priests. In all likelihood, the parish's predominance of Kaszubian Poles led to the addition of "Sacred Heart" to the church's name, recognizing a devotion particularly dear to Poles.

The first permanent pastor was the Reverend Florentine Zadzioski, who arrived in 1866. Until roughly the turn of the century, pastors came and went frequently. As Polonia expanded, Polish-speaking priests were in high demand, and not every priest could flourish in a rustic setting like Pine Creek. The arrival of the Reverend Jakob W. Gara as pastor on June 10, 1904, marked the beginning of an era for Sacred Heart-Saint Wenceslaus. Although he ruled the parish with an iron hand, as was expected of Roman Catholic pastors in those days, he was genuinely beloved by his flock. One anecdote relates that Reverend Gara was known to appear in the local saloons and buy the patrons (all of whom were his parishioners) a round. He died, worn out from his efforts at the comparatively young age of 62, on December 29, 1937. His funeral on January 3, 1938, was attended by more than 1,500 mourners. After Reverend Gara's death, the parish was pastored by Polish-speaking priests well into the 1960s.

== Sacred Heart-Saint Wenceslaus Church ==
The original Sacred Heart-Saint Wenceslaus Church, a small frame building, was constructed shortly after the parish's formal establishment in 1864. It stood on top of the hill, overlooking the location of the current church. On May 10, 1875, a new pastor, the Reverend Adolf Snigurski, began construction of the present church. This church was designed by C.G. Maybury of Winona, who later designed the Basilica of Saint Stanislaus Kostka in Winona, Minnesota. On November 12, 1875, it was completed and dedicated. Combined with the rectory, the parish school building, and the convent built for the nuns who taught at the parish school, the church literally dominated the hamlet of Pine Creek. As the Winona Republican Herald commented in reporting on Sacred Heart-Saint Wenceslaus's fiftieth anniversary celebration, the church was truly a village in itself.

As with other similar Roman Catholic churches in the area, Sacred Heart-Saint Wenceslaus Church underwent numerous changes made for structural and for liturgical reasons. Most recently, the entire church has been renovated in a way selected to recall as much as possible the original configuration from 1875. This "restoration" is particularly appropriate seeing that Sacred Heart-Saint Wenceslaus will be celebrating its 150th anniversary in the fall of 2012.

== Sacred Heart-Saint Wenceslaus Parish School ==
The Saint Wenceslaus-Sacred Heart faith community set great store by education from the very start. Religious instruction came first, of course, and a public school existed in Pine Creek from the mid-1870s on and off until 1946. But it was important that the children's formal education also be grounded in Roman Catholic beliefs and values. Building a school was the easy part: a brick schoolhouse was completed in 1890 for the handsome sum of $3,000. The challenge was to find suitable teachers. By 1890, teaching Sisters were in great demand – and short supply. Fortunately, the Sisters of St. Francis of Assisi (OSF), from Saint Francis, Wisconsin, came to Pine Creek in 1898.

The school was expanded to four rooms in 1906, with instruction in both Polish and English. Sometimes one nun would teach two or even three grades in one classroom, but it was nothing the good Sisters could not handle. There was a tradition that public school students aged twelve and thirteen – that is, of Confirmation age – would attend the Catholic school for a year to complete their religious education. In 1949 the Sisters of St. Joseph of the Third Order of St. Francis came from Stevens Point, Wisconsin to take up teaching duties. A modern combination of school and convent, built on land donated by the Kujak family, was dedicated on November 10, 1961. The school closed down in 1976 but the building still serves as the rectory.
