= Fort Dodge (disambiguation) =

Fort Dodge is a city in Webster County, Iowa, U.S.

It may also refer to:

- Fort Dodge, Kansas, unincorporated community in Ford County, Kansas, U.S.
- Fort Dodge (US Army Post), 19th-century military base in Kansas, U.S.

== See also ==
- Dodge City, Kansas
- Dodge (disambiguation)
