= Pine Creek, Wisconsin =

- Unincorporated community
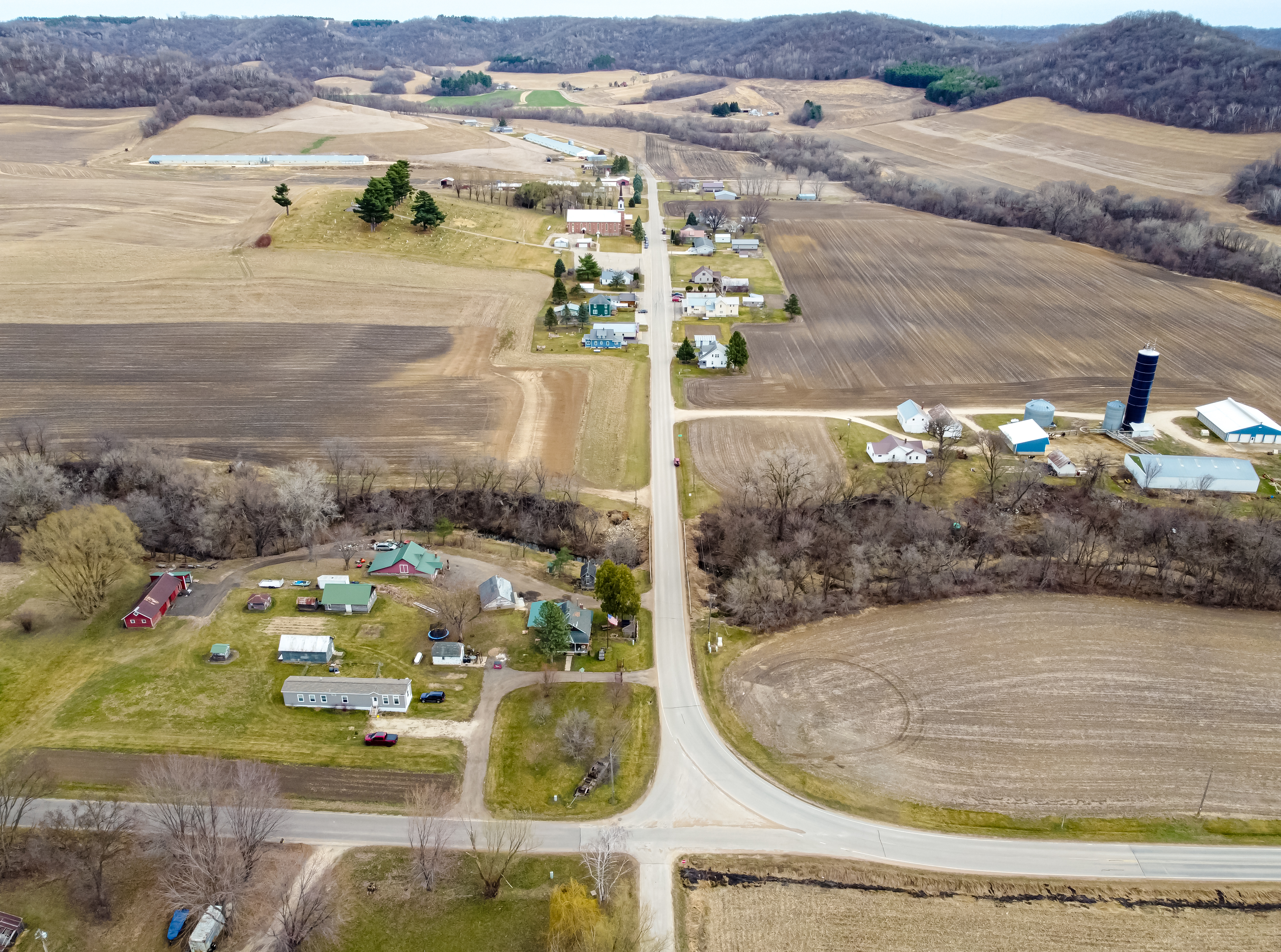
- Pine Creek runs through town

- Location within Wisconsin Location within the United States
- Coordinates: 44°08′04″N 91°31′37″W
- Country: United States
- State: Wisconsin
- County: Trempealeau
- Elevation: 768 ft (234 m)
- Time zone: UTC-6 (Central (CST))
  - Summer (DST): UTC-5 (CDT)
- Area code: 608
- GNIS feature ID: 1571425

Pine Creek is an unincorporated community located in the town of Dodge, Trempealeau County, Wisconsin, United States. Pine Creek is located on Pine Creek and County Highway G, 9.6 miles (15.4 km) west-northwest of Galesville.

== History of Pine Creek ==
Early in the 1860s, Kaszubian Polish and Bohemian immigrants living in Winona, Minnesota began buying land across the Mississippi River in Trempealeau County. The Pine Creek area was ideal because of its thick black soil and its advantageous proximity to Winona's markets and services. The precise date of Pine Creek's establishment remains problematic but most accounts give 1862, which is also the year that Sacred Heart-Saint Wenceslaus Church was founded. Once the parish was formally established as part of the then-Roman Catholic Diocese of Milwaukee, a small community grew up around the church, including two or three taverns, a dance hall, and a general store. Although important in the history of the Kashubian diaspora, Pine Creek never became more than a small community due to the growth of the nearby town of Dodge, Wisconsin.

== Notable people ==
- Martin D. Brom, Wisconsin State Assemblyman, was born in Pine Creek.
