= Dodge (given name) =

Dodge is a given name. People with this given name include:

- Dodge MacKnight (1860–1950), American painter
- Dodge Morgan (1932–2010), American sailor, businessman and publisher

== Fictional characters ==
- Dodge Connolly, in the film Leatherheads
- Brian "Dodge" Forbes, fictional character on Australian soap opera Home and Away
- Dodge Hickey, a recurring character on My Name Is Earl
- Dodge, the "well lady" of Keyhouse in the TV series Locke and Key
- Dodge Charger, a faux name of a human turned anthropomorphic alien dog on Solar Opposites
