= Charles Dodge =

Charles Dodge may refer to:

- Charles C. Dodge (1841–1910), Brigadier General during the American Civil War at the age of twenty-one
- Charles Dodge (composer) (born 1942), composer of electronic music
