= Dodge (CDP), Wisconsin =

Census-designated place in Wisconsin, United States

Dodge, Wisconsin
- Census-designated place
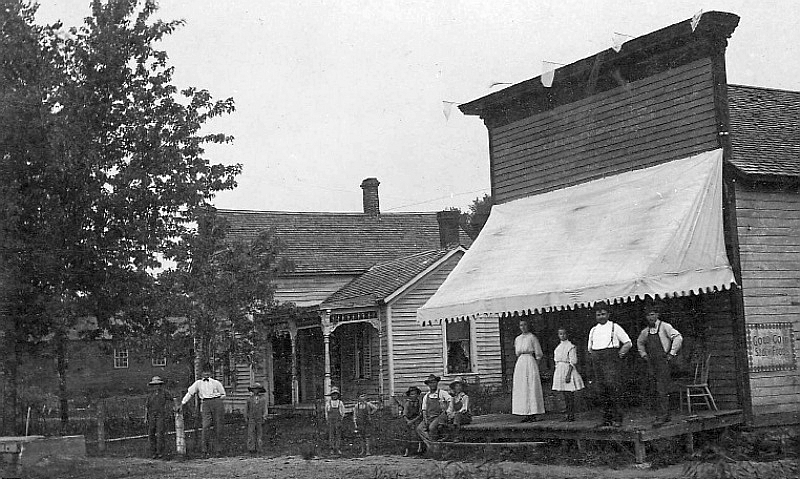
- Dodge, 1910

- Location within Wisconsin
- Coordinates: 44°07′56″N 91°33′08″W
- Country: United States
- State: Wisconsin
- County: Trempealeau

Area
  - Total: 0.410 sq mi (1.06 km^{2})
  - Land: 0.410 sq mi (1.06 km^{2})
  - Water: 0 sq mi (0 km^{2})
- Elevation: 669 ft (204 m)

Population (2020)
  - Total: 121
  - Density: 295/sq mi (114/km^{2})
- Time zone: UTC-6 (Central (CST))
  - Summer (DST): UTC-5 (CDT)
- ZIP code: 54625
- Area code: 608
- GNIS feature ID: 1564019

Dodge is an unincorporated census-designated place located in the town of Dodge, Trempealeau County, Wisconsin, United States. Dodge is 8.5 miles (13.7 km) south-southwest of Arcadia. Dodge has a post office with ZIP code 54625. As of the 2020 census, its population was 121, representing no change from the 2010 census.
