= Dodge County =

Dodge County is the name of four counties in the United States:

- Dodge County, Georgia
- Dodge County, Minnesota
- Dodge County, Nebraska
- Dodge County, Wisconsin
