= Toby Dodge =

English political scientist

Toby Dodge is an English political scientist whose main area of interest lies in the Middle East. He completed a PhD on the transformation of international system in the aftermath of the First World War and the creation of the Iraqi state at the School of Oriental and African Studies, University of London. He also taught international relations and Middle Eastern politics in the Department of Political Studies at SOAS for four years. Toby was Senior Research Fellow at the Centre for the Study of Globalisation and Regionalisation at the University of Warwick. He is currently a Reader in the International Relations department at LSE and Senior Consulting Fellow for the Middle East at the International Institute for Strategic Studies (a UK-based think tank).

Toby is an expert on the politics of Iraq and has published several books relating to this and international relations more generally. His expertise has led to a series of television appearances on news programmes to discuss the invasion of Iraq.

Dodge has also served as an occasional adviser to U.S. general David Petraeus in Iraq.

== Bibliography ==
- Inventing Iraq: The failure of nation building and a history denied (2003)
- Iraq's Future: The Aftermath of Regime Change (2005)
- Iraq: From War to a New Authoritarianism (2013)
