= Artful Dodger (disambiguation) =

Artful Dodger is a character from the 1838 Charles Dickens novel Oliver Twist.

Artful Dodger may also refer to:

== Music ==
- Artful Dodger (American band), a power pop/rock band
- Artful Dodger (duo), a UK garage duo
- The Artful Dodger (album) or the title song, by Ian Hunter, 1996
- The Artful Dodger, music producer for Australian independent record label Playback 808

== Television ==
- The Artful Dodger (1959 TV series), a 1959 British sitcom
- The Artful Dodger (2023 TV series), a 2023 Australian TV series
- "The Artful Dodger" (NCIS), a television episode
- "The Artful Dodger!" (The Raccoons), a television episode

== Other uses ==
- Artful Dodger, a clothing brand owned by Jay-Z and Iconix Brand Group
- Condredge Holloway (born 1954), American former gridiron football quarterback nicknamed the "Artful Dodger"
