= Christopher Dodge House =

House in Providence, Rhode Island

Coordinates: 41.83111°N 71.41843°W

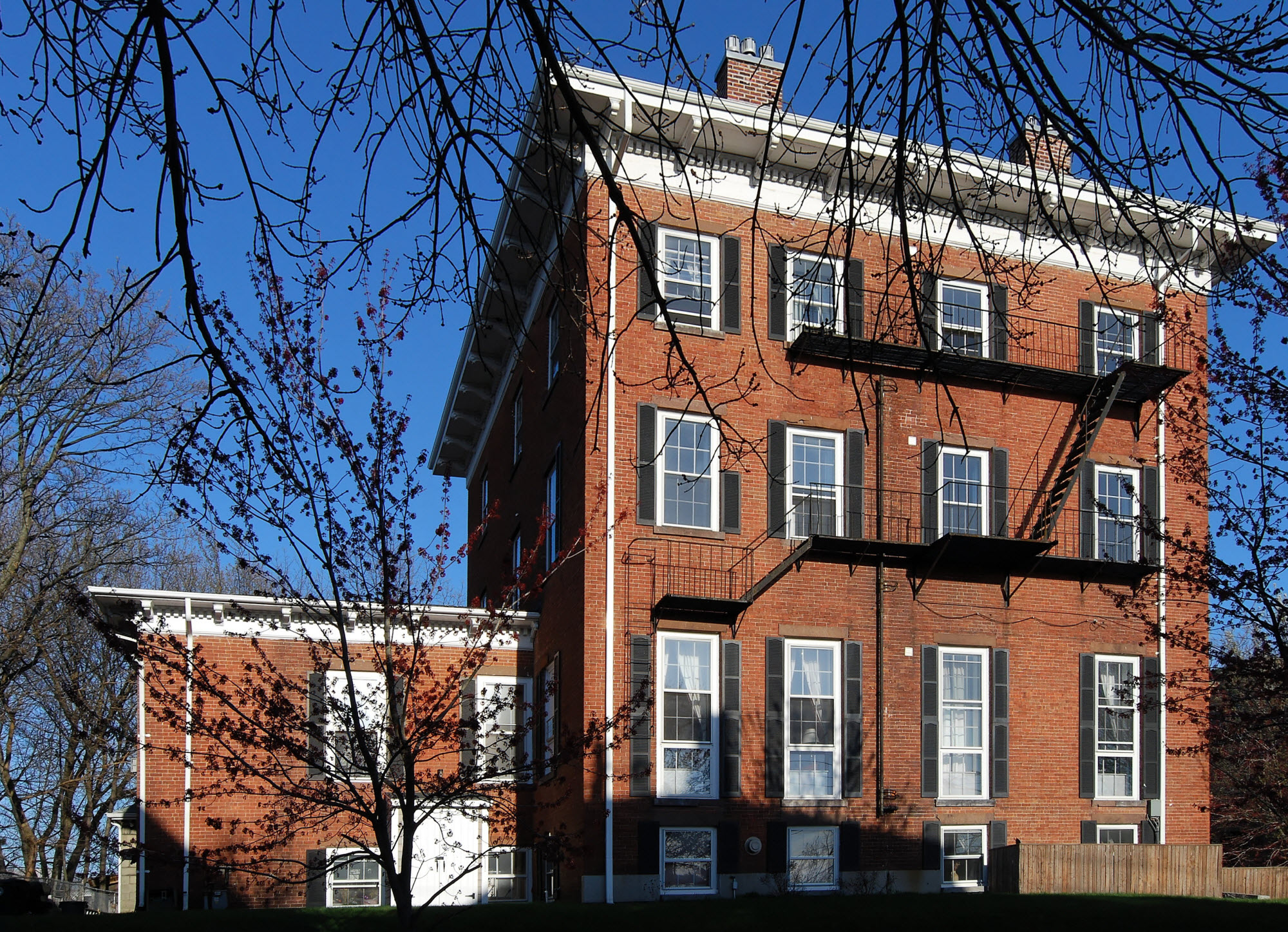
Christopher Dodge House (ca. 1856), Holden Street, Providence, Rhode Island

Christopher Dodge House is a house in the Smith Hill neighborhood of Providence, Rhode Island that was built in 1858 by the industrialist and dye works owner Christopher Dodge. It is operated as a bed and breakfast hotel.

The Christopher Dodge House was used by the Dodge family throughout the nineteenth century. By 1901, it had become a tenement house. Bed and breakfast owner Monica Hopton and her husband Frank opened the bed and breakfast in 2002. Notable guests include Joan Rivers. Singer-songwriter Lisa Loeb also visited the bed and breakfast; the Commodores booked rooms and invited staff to their concert but ended up heading back to New York.

The nearby Christopher Dodge Carriage House is now occupied on the ground floor by the Rise ’N Shine Coffee Bar. The cafe's decor commemorates the owner's great-grandfather, who worked as a cobbler in New York City.
