= Dodge (cyclecar) =

Cyclecar manufactured in Detroit, Michigan, by the A.M. Dodge Company from 1914 to 1915

The Dodge was an American cyclecar manufactured in Detroit, Michigan, by the A.M. Dodge Company from 1914 to 1915. The cyclecar had a four-cylinder 25 hp engine that was water-cooled, and had a frictionless transmission. The vehicle was designed by George Wahl of Wahl Motor Company. The company was later sued by the Dodge brothers in 1915, who claimed that their name had been infringed.
