= West Brom =

West Brom is an abbreviation that may refer to:

- West Bromwich, a town in the West Midlands, England
  - West Bromwich Albion F.C. a professional association football team based in West Bromwich
  - West Bromwich Building Society, a building society whose headquarters are in West Bromwich
