= Martin D. Brom =

American farmer and politician

Martin D. Brom (June 29, 1880 – February 27, 1954) was an American farmer and politician.

Born in the community of Pine Creek, in the town of Dodge, Trempealeau County, Wisconsin, Brom was a farmer and the manager of the Farmers Cooperative Oil Company. Brom served on the Trempealeau County Board of Supervisors from 1911 to 1918. He also served as sheriff of Trempealeau County from 1927 to 1931 and 1937 to 1941 and was a Republican. Brom served in the Wisconsin State Assembly in 1941 and 1943. Brom died in a hospital in Winona, Minnesota.
