= Dodge Township =

Dodge Township may refer to:

- Dodge Township, Boone County, Iowa
- Dodge Township, Dubuque County, Iowa
- Dodge Township, Guthrie County, Iowa
- Dodge Township, Ford County, Kansas
