= Mick Dodge =

American television personality

Mick Dodge (born August 29, 1951), also known as "The Barefoot Sensei", "the Barefooted Nomad" and "Walking Mountain" is a television personality and rainforest-dweller in Washington.

== Early life ==
Dodge is a native of the Olympic Peninsula. His great-grandparents settled in the region and Dodge grew up there as a child. He loved the outdoors. Dodge also lived in many other places around the country and the world as the son of a career Marine, Ronald L. Dodge. The younger Dodge graduated from high school in Okinawa, Japan. He enlisted in the Marine Corps and served for six years.

== In the forest ==
In 1991, Dodge decided to leave the modern world and retreat to the dense forest due to the stress of modern living. He has remained in the forest for over 30 years, typically only ever re-entering the public as a last resort for serious medical emergencies.

== EarthGym program ==
Despite the preference to be separated from modern civilization, Dodge is still involved with the community. In 1994, he and Jacquie Chandler created an earth-based fitness program they called The EarthGym, a fitness program in the forest where nature provides most of the equipment for physical training.

== Media ==
Dodge is the subject of the National Geographic Channel reality TV series The Legend of Mick Dodge, about his unusual life dwelling in a forest.
