= Dodge-Greenleaf House =

Historic house in New York, United States

- U.S. National Register of Historic Places
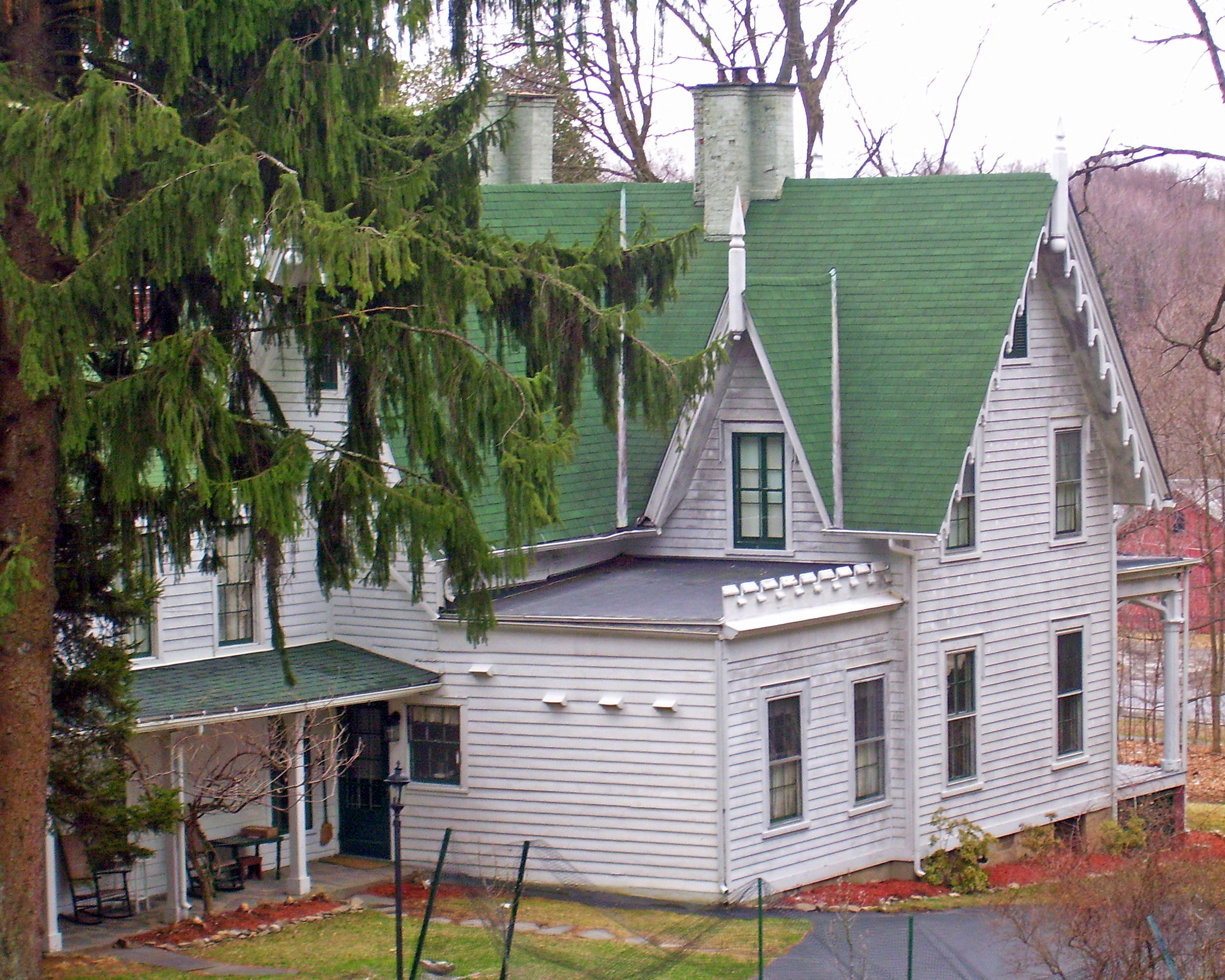
- Front (west) elevation and north profile, 2008
- Location: Otisville, NY
- Nearest city: Port Jervis
- Coordinates: 41°28′32″N 74°32′37″W
- Area: 3.6 acres (15,000 m^{2})
- Built: c. 1855; renovated and expanded in late 1870s
- Architectural style: Gothic Revival
- NRHP reference No.: 08000142
- Added to NRHP: March 5, 2008

The Dodge-Greenleaf House is on NY 211 in Otisville, New York, United States. It was built circa 1855 in the Gothic Revival style. The architect is unknown, but it exemplifies contemporary trends in home design popularized by the writings and pattern books of Andrew Jackson Downing of nearby Newburgh, as articulated in the Picturesque mode.

Since its construction it has remained a private home. At one point it was owned by the Erie Railroad, used as worker housing while it was building the Otisville Tunnel beneath the property. It was added to the National Register of Historic Places on March 5, 2008, the first in Otisville to be so listed.

== Building ==
The house sits on a slightly sloping 2.1 acres (8,500 m^{2}) lot between Route 211 and Main Street, on the west side of Otisville near where the highway crests a low area of the Shawangunk Ridge. A neighboring 1.5 acres (6,100 m^{2}) parcel is included in the Register listing, for a total of 3.6 acres (15,000 m^{2}) including the house, three outbuildings, two objects, a ruin and a non-contributing swimming pool.

It is a 1 1/2-story frame with a two-story wing to the rear, giving it an L-shape. The facade is three bays wide. The green rolled asphalt roof is steeply pitched, cross-gabled with smaller dormer gables. Bargeboards decorate the cornices of the intersecting gables, with turned finials at the apexes. Two large brick chimneys further accentuate the vertical Gothic motifs.

A veranda on brick piers matches the Gothic trim on the gables, with clustered octagonal-capitalled columns and open-work tracery at the soffitt. Below the deck, wooden latticework fills the gaps between the piers.

The recessed center entrance has a Tudor frontispiece, opening to the main hallway, and is flanked by two smaller openings with French doors, leading to the living and dining rooms. A kitchen and den complete the first floor. The floors in all rooms save the den are sawn-oak parquet, and the ten-foot (3 m) ceilings have cornices, some with detail work in the plaster. All window and door openings have wide architraves with rounded molding, a typical feature of Picturesque buildings. The living room wall has wainscot and a bay window with corbeled plaster arch. The decor includes two fireplaces with Italianate marble mantelpieces and period coal grates. Under the keystone of the den mantel is carved "ASD" for Algernon S. Dodge, first owner of the house.

The wing has the same features as the full house, with which it was once connected. Of the detached contributing buildings and structures, the barn features the most Gothic detailing, especially on its window surrounds. It was painted gray, and made with board-and-batten siding, as was the 1 1/2-story potting shed. The rafter tails are exposed and curved, another Gothic touch.

The outhouse also used board-and-batten siding with Gothic detail on the trim. Unusually, it has two holes for adults with one for a child. Other contributing structures on the site include an old gas pump near the barn, a cut-granite hitching post and a remnant of the early foundation.

== History ==
Algernon Dodge, keeper of the local general store, bought the property from its original owners, the Loomis family, in 1851. He was an active local businessman, owner of 13 sawmills across nearby Sullivan County and a director of the Otisville & Wurtsboro Turnpike Company, operators of the road that has since become Route 211. He married one of the Loomis daughters, and lived in the house from the time of its completion to his death in 1881, shortly after some renovations and expansions that likely included the addition of the rear wing.

His son Alsop inherited it, but moved to Colorado shortly afterwards. He retained ownership of the house until selling it in 1902 to a William E. Morse, who in turn sold it roughly four years later to a subsidiary of the Erie Railroad for $5, so it could build the mile-long (1.6 km) tunnel still in use under the property. The supervising engineer for the tunnel, considered an engineering marvel in its day, lived in the house for at least some of the time it was under construction.

In 1908, with the tunnel complete, the railroad sold the house to Oscar Shaw Greenleaf for $1. His son Oscar Benton Greenleaf, who later became a local philanthropist, lived there until 1984. He sold the house to another couple who lived there for two decades, selling to the present owners in 2005.

== Aesthetic ==
At the time of the house's construction, in the early 1850s, American domestic architecture was undergoing a transition from the Greek Revival style exemplified in the Avery Cook house adjacent to the Dodge property to the cottage-style homes advocated by Andrew Jackson Downing in books such as The Architecture of Country Houses and Rural Residences. Downing had died in a steamboat explosion in 1852, but Samuel Sloan of Philadelphia had filled the pattern-book void with titles like Sloan's Homestead Architecture and American Houses, a Variety of Designs for Rural Buildings, featuring designs showing the influence of Downing and his theories. Algernon Dodge, by building a house so clearly in the newer style, was on the leading edge of the tastes of his time in rural areas

The Dodge-Greenleaf House's detailing is similar to many of Sloan's examples, although they were published slightly later than the period generally accepted as that in which it was built. The steeply pitched gables, high chimneys and filials are the most striking Gothic Revival component of the exterior; although the house is generally symmetrical its intersecting gables give it a strong Picturesque quality as well. Original vertical board-and-batten siding also exemplified the style. The interior is more conventionally Picturesque, with the finished marble suggesting a later Italianate influence, perhaps from the 1870s renovations.

== See also ==
- National Register of Historic Places listings in Orange County, New York
