= Dodge Site =

Archaeological site in Ohio, United States

- U.S. National Register of Historic Places
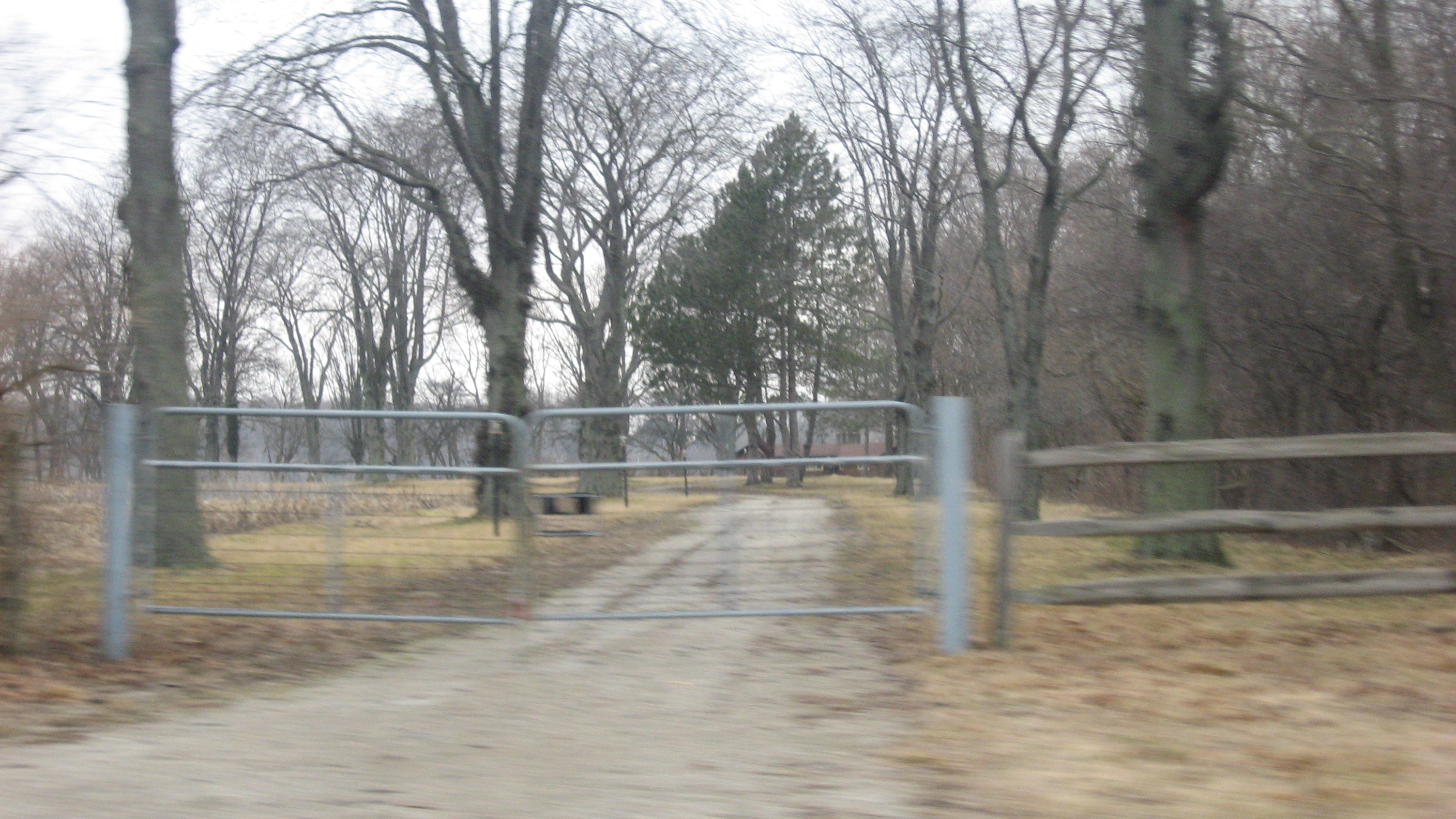
- Western side of the site

- Location within Ohio Location within the United States
- Location: 17090 W. River Rd., north of Bowling Green
- Nearest city: Bowling Green, Ohio
- Coordinates: 41°29′0″N 83°43′46″W
- Area: 2.2 acres (0.89 ha)
- NRHP reference No.: 78002214
- Added to NRHP: March 29, 1978

The Dodge Site is an archaeological site in the northwestern part of the U.S. state of Ohio. Located north of Bowling Green in Wood County, the site was inhabited by Middle Woodland and Upper Mississippian peoples. Among the artifacts discovered at the site are ceramics and stone tools. The site's stratigraphy is obvious: the Middle Woodland village site and cemetery can easily be distinguished from the Upper Mississippian occupation zone that sits on top of it. While only a small portion of the 2.2 acre (0.89 ha) site has been excavated, the artifacts that have been discovered at Dodge have contributed significantly to an understanding of the western basin of Lake Erie around AD 1300. Enough material has been recovered to facilitate radiometric dating, as well as identifying the peoples who once inhabited the site. The excavations also revealed the intensity of occupation: the Middle Woodland layer was substantially larger than the exceptionally thin Upper Mississippian component.

In 1978, the National Park Service recognized the Dodge Site's archaeological value by listing it on the National Register of Historic Places. Five years later, owners Henry Dodge and his wife donated the site to The Archaeological Conservancy in the interests of preservation.
