= Dodge House (Mishawaka, Indiana) =

Historic house in Indiana, United States

- U.S. National Register of Historic Places
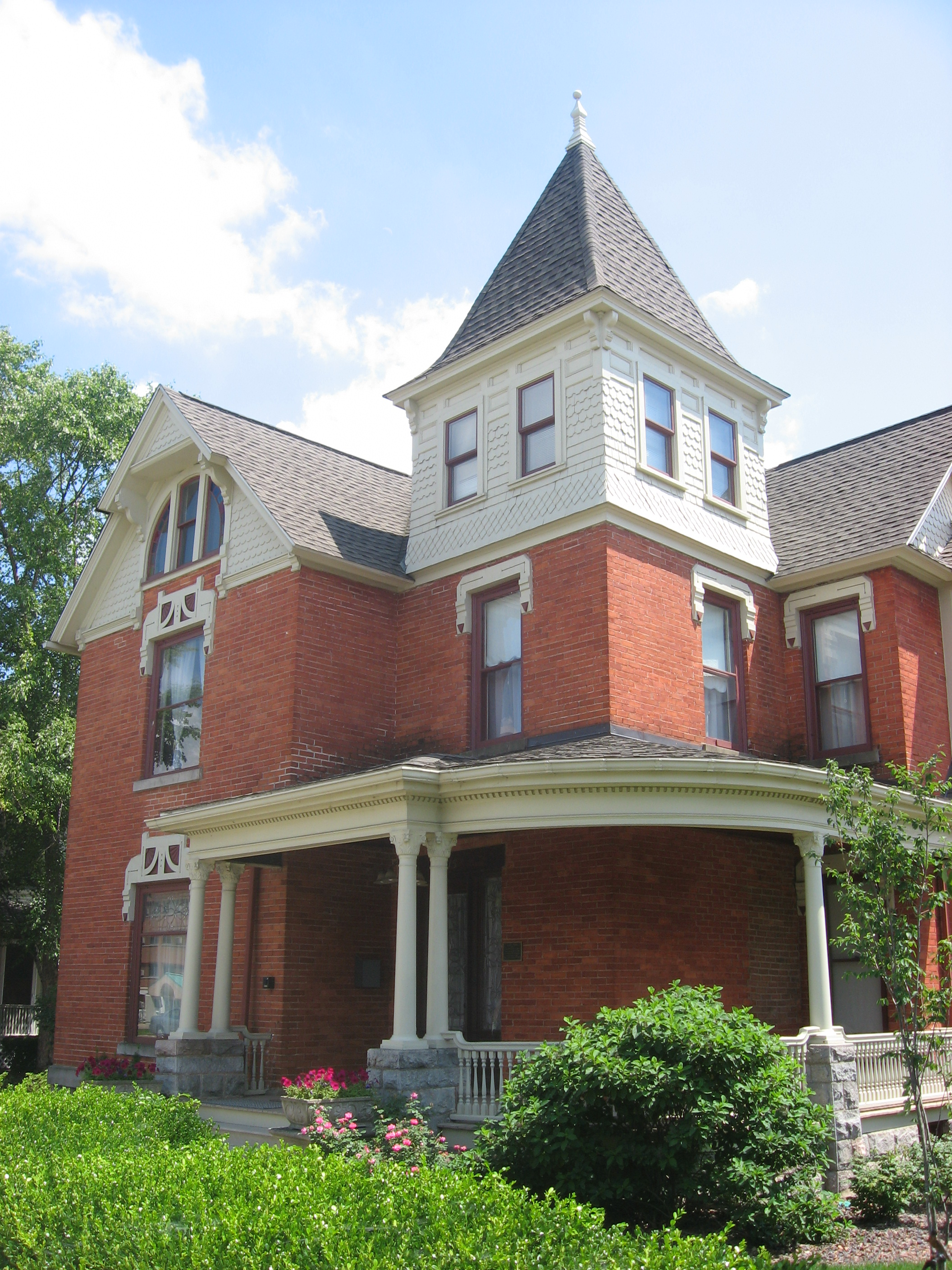
- Dodge House, July 2013

- Location within Indiana Location within the United States
- Location: 415 Lincolnway E., Mishawaka, Indiana
- Coordinates: 41°39′39″N 86°10′35″W
- Area: 0.2 acres (0.081 ha)
- Built: 1889
- Architectural style: Queen Anne
- NRHP reference No.: 78000052
- Added to NRHP: September 8, 1978

Dodge House, also known as the Claeys House, is a historic home located at Mishawaka, Indiana. It was built about 1889, and is a 2 1/2-story, irregular plan, Queen Anne style brick dwelling. It has a tower, wraparound verandah, and hipped and gable roof.

It was listed on the National Register of Historic Places in 1978.
