= Dodge City (disambiguation) =

Dodge City, Kansas, is a city in the United States, noted for its place in Wild West history and its inspiration of the phrase "get out of Dodge".

Dodge City may also refer to:

== Education ==
- Dodge City Community College, in Dodge City, Kansas
  - Dodge City Conquistadors, the community college's sports teams
- Dodge City High School, in Dodge City, Kansas

== Places ==
- Dodge City, Alabama, a town in Cullman County
- Dodge City, New South Wales, nickname for West Brewarrina

== Sport ==
- Dodge City Conquistadors, the community college's sports teams
- Dodge City Law, a professional indoor football team in Dodge City, Kansas
- Dodge City Legend, a former United States Basketball League team in Dodge City, Kansas

== Transport ==
- Dodge City Army Air Field, in Ford County, Kansas
- Dodge City Regional Airport, in Ford County, Kansas
- Dodge City station, an Amtrak train station in Dodge City, Kansas

== Other uses ==
- Dodge City (film), a 1939 Western about Dodge City, Kansas
- Dodge City Gang, a group of Kansas gunfighters and gamblers who dominated Las Vegas, New Mexico, in 1879 and early 1880
- Roman Catholic Diocese of Dodge City, in southwestern Kansas
