= Dodge Reservoir =

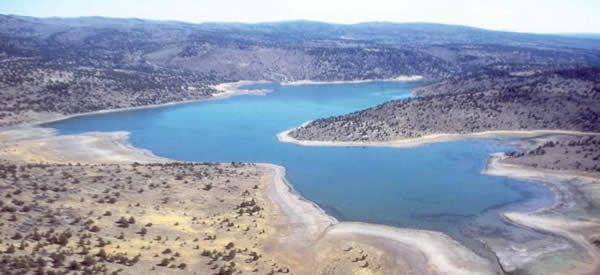
- View of Dodge Reservoir

- Location within California Location within the United States
- Location: Northern Sierras, Lassen County, northeast of Ravendale, California
- Coordinates: 40.9682°N 120.1377°W
- Type: Reservoir
- Basin countries: United States
- Max. length: 1.5 mi (2.4 km)
- Surface area: 491 acres (199 ha)
- Max. depth: 72 ft (22 m)
- Surface elevation: 5,600 ft (1,700 m)

Dodge Reservoir, located in Lassen County, was created in 1937 by the owners of the Dodge Ranch. It covers an area of 491 acres (199 ha) among Great Basin high-desert sagebrush (Artemisia tridentata) and California Juniper. The surrounding habitat is Sagebrush steppe, and is part of the Northern Basin and Range ecoregion. The Dodge Ranch continues to hold the title to the water rights of the reservoir.

== Fishing ==
The Dodge Reservoir has been historically stocked by the California Department of Fish and Game with fishes like the rainbow, Eagle Lake, brown, and Lahontan cutthroat trouts. Fishing is best during the spring and early summer.

== Access ==
Although it is open year round, access can be limited by its unimproved dirt roads during wet weather. The last mile (1.6 km) leading up to the reservoir can become inaccessible with even a small amount of rain or snow.

There is a nearby campground operated by the Bureau of Land Management, containing picnic tables, a toilet, and a dirt boat ramp, from which small boats can be launched. No trash services, RV hookups, shade or potable water are provided. No fees are collected for the use of the campsite, but donations are accepted.

== See also ==
- List of lakes in California
