= Dodge Building =

- U.S. National Register of Historic Places
- U.S. Historic district – Contributing property
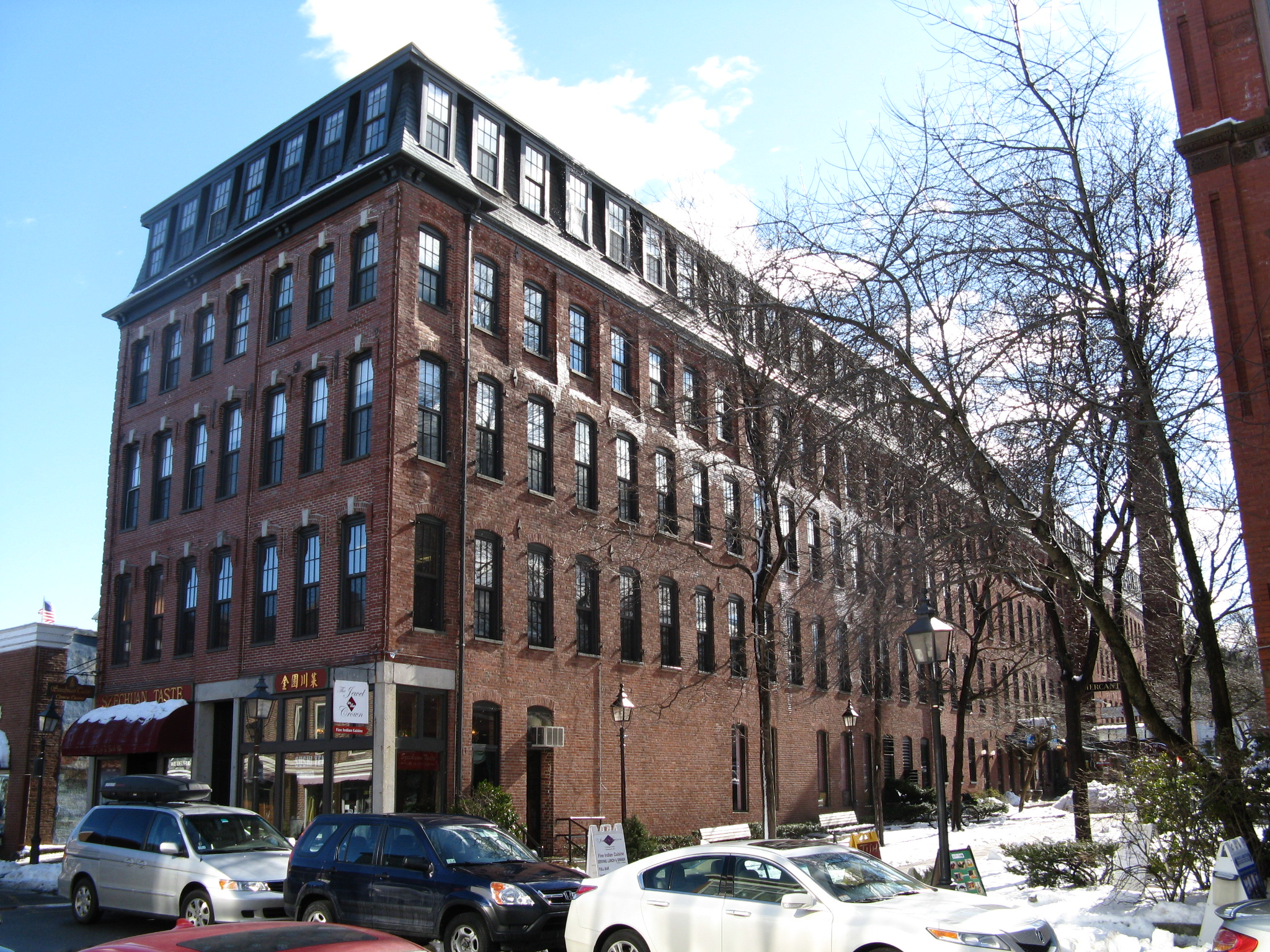
- Dodge Building

- Location within Massachusetts Location within the United States
- Location: Newburyport, Massachusetts
- Coordinates: 42°48′36″N 70°52′50″W
- Built: 1873
- Part of: Newburyport Historic District (ID84002411)
- NRHP reference No.: 82001878

Significant dates
- Added to NRHP: August 26, 1982
- Designated CP: August 2, 1984

The E. P. Dodge Building is a historic building at 19-23 Pleasant Street in Newburyport, Massachusetts. The Italianate five story brick building was built in 1873 by Elisha P. Dodge, a shoemaker, for use as a factory. When first built it was only four stories, but when Dodge enlarged the premises in 1880, the mansard section was added on top (in addition to extending the building to the rear as far as Prince Place). The building remained in use as a shoe factory until the 1930s, and is now used for commercial and light industrial purposes.

The building was listed on the National Register of Historic Places in 1982, and included in the Newburyport Historic District in 1984.

== See also ==
- National Register of Historic Places listings in Essex County, Massachusetts
