= Dodge, Wisconsin =

- Town
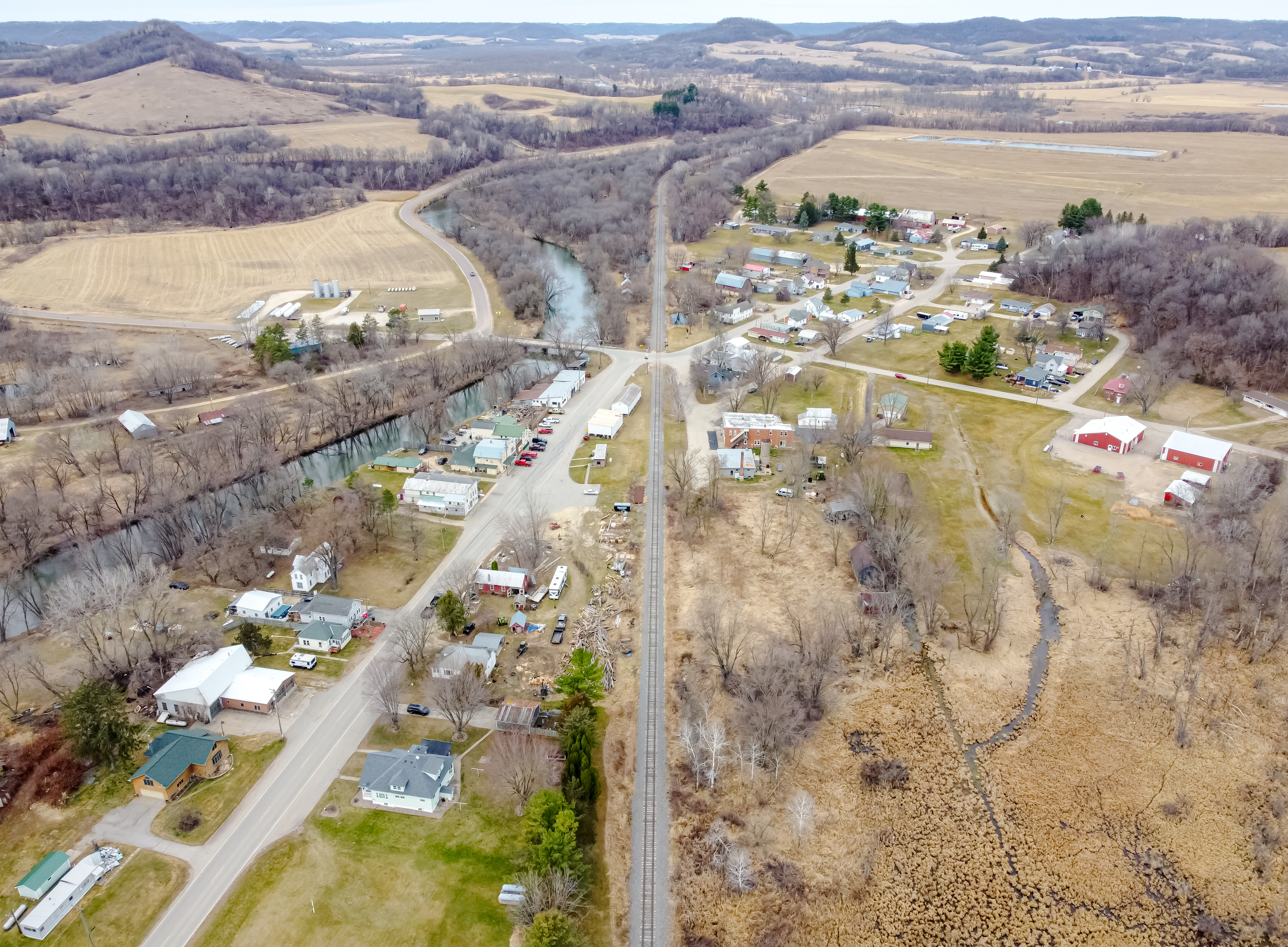
- The Trempealeau River runs through town

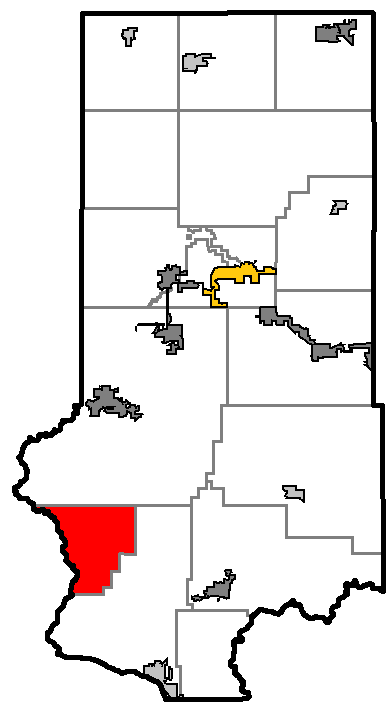
- Location of Dodge, Trempealeau County

- Location of Trempealeau County, Wisconsin
- Coordinates: 44°7′58″N 91°31′19″W
- Country: United States
- State: Wisconsin
- County: Trempealeau

Area
  - Total: 21.4 sq mi (55.4 km^{2})
  - Land: 21.4 sq mi (55.4 km^{2})
  - Water: 0 sq mi (0.0 km^{2})
- Elevation: 968 ft (295 m)

Population (2020)
  - Total: 394
  - Density: 18.4/sq mi (7.11/km^{2})
- Time zone: UTC-6 (Central (CST))
  - Summer (DST): UTC-5 (CDT)
- FIPS code: 55-20300
- GNIS feature ID: 1583086
- Website: https://townofdodgewi.com/

Dodge is a town in Trempealeau County, Wisconsin, United States. The population was 394 at the 2020 census. The census-designated place of Dodge is located in the town. The unincorporated community of Pine Creek is also located in the town.

== History ==
The town was named for William E. Dodge, a New York resident who co-founded the Phelps-Dodge Mining Corporation and YMCA of the US.

== Geography ==
According to the United States Census Bureau, the town has a total area of 21.4 square miles (55.4 km^{2}), all land.

=== Climate ===
Climate data for Dodge, Wisconsin (1991–2020)
| Month | Jan | Feb | Mar | Apr | May | Jun | Jul | Aug | Sep | Oct | Nov | Dec | Year |
|---|---|---|---|---|---|---|---|---|---|---|---|---|---|
| Mean daily maximum °F (°C) | 27.1 (−2.7) | 32.4 (0.2) | 45.5 (7.5) | 59.7 (15.4) | 71.5 (21.9) | 79.6 (26.4) | 83.5 (28.6) | 80.9 (27.2) | 74.3 (23.5) | 60.9 (16.1) | 44.6 (7.0) | 32.2 (0.1) | 57.7 (14.3) |
| Daily mean °F (°C) | 17.4 (−8.1) | 22.4 (−5.3) | 34.5 (1.4) | 47.6 (8.7) | 59.0 (15.0) | 68.3 (20.2) | 72.0 (22.2) | 69.6 (20.9) | 62.5 (16.9) | 49.9 (9.9) | 35.6 (2.0) | 23.3 (−4.8) | 46.8 (8.3) |
| Mean daily minimum °F (°C) | 7.8 (−13.4) | 12.4 (−10.9) | 23.5 (−4.7) | 35.5 (1.9) | 46.5 (8.1) | 56.9 (13.8) | 60.5 (15.8) | 58.3 (14.6) | 50.8 (10.4) | 38.8 (3.8) | 26.7 (−2.9) | 14.5 (−9.7) | 36.0 (2.2) |
| Average precipitation inches (mm) | 0.95 (24) | 1.05 (27) | 1.93 (49) | 3.72 (94) | 4.30 (109) | 4.99 (127) | 3.80 (97) | 4.32 (110) | 3.50 (89) | 2.72 (69) | 1.74 (44) | 1.37 (35) | 34.39 (874) |
| Average snowfall inches (cm) | 8.0 (20) | 9.5 (24) | 6.6 (17) | 1.7 (4.3) | 0.6 (1.5) | 0.0 (0.0) | 0.0 (0.0) | 0.0 (0.0) | 0.0 (0.0) | 0.1 (0.25) | 2.5 (6.4) | 13.4 (34) | 42.4 (107.45) |
Source: NOAA

== Demographics ==
As of the 2000 census, there were 414 people, 160 households, and 116 families residing in the town. The population density was 19.4 people per square mile (7.5/km^{2}). There were 176 housing units at an average density of 8.2 per square mile (3.2/km^{2}).

There were 160 households, out of which 35.6% had children under the age of 18 living with them, 62.5% were married couples living together, 5.6% had a female householder with no husband present, and 26.9% were non-families. 23.1% of all households were made up of individuals, and 9.4% had someone living alone who was 65 years of age or older. The average household size was 2.59 and the average family size was 3.08.

In the town, the population was 27.3% under the age of 18, 7.5% from 18 to 24, 28.3% from 25 to 44, 24.9% from 45 to 64, and 12.1% who were 65 years of age or older. The median age was 37 years. For every 100 females, there were 95.3 males. For every 100 females age 18 and over, there were 95.5 males.

The median income for a household in the town was $40,972, and the median income for a family was $42,625. Males had a median income of $30,625 versus $20,588 for females. The per capita income for the town was $15,167. About 7.6% of families and 10.2% of the population were below the poverty line, including 10.1% of those under age 18 and 15.4% of those age 65 or over.

== Gallery ==
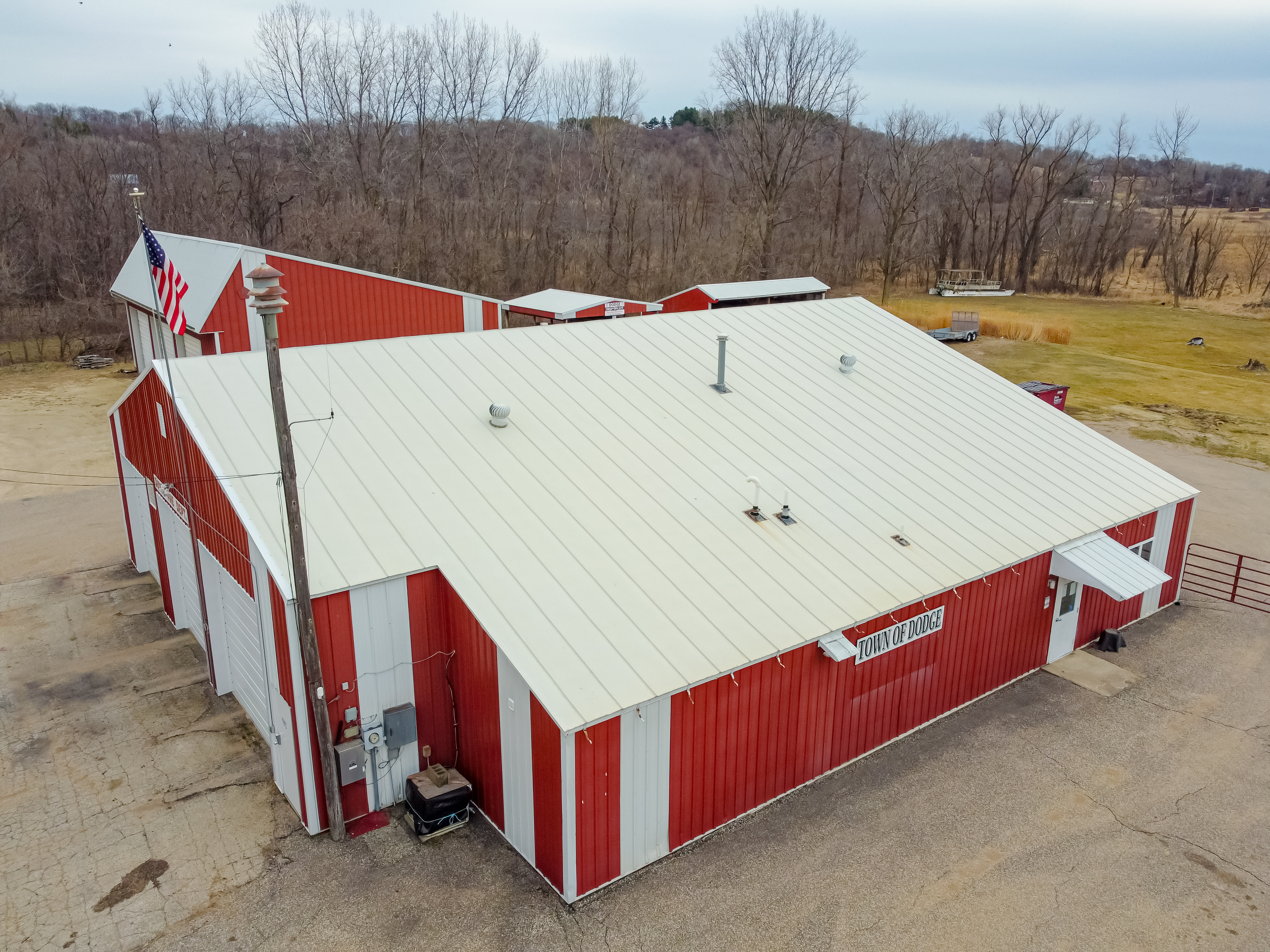
Town of Dodge town hall

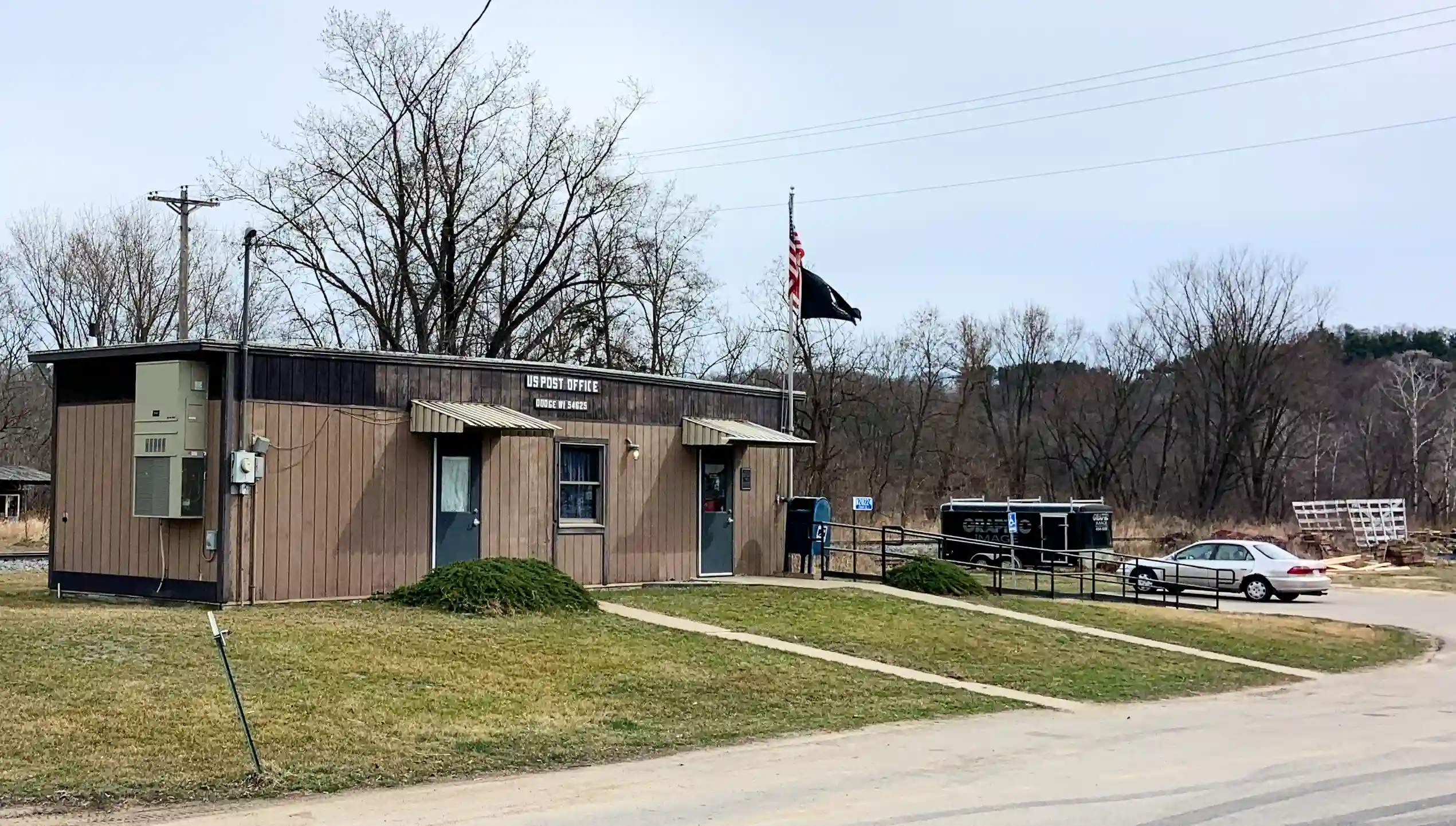
Post office

== Notable people ==
- Martin D. Brom, a member of the Wisconsin State Assembly, lived in the town
