= Helen Dodge Three-Decker =

- U.S. National Register of Historic Places
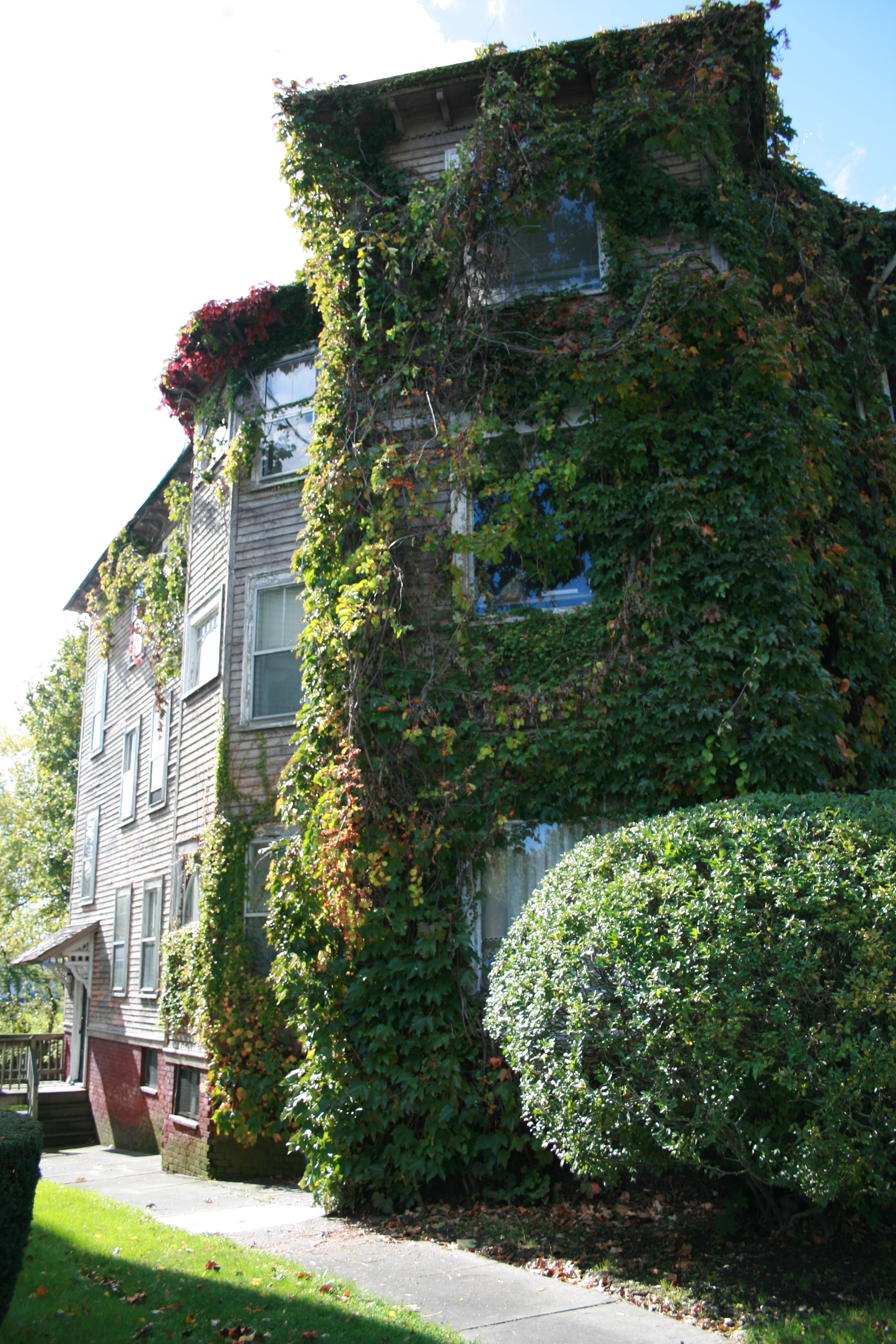

- Location within Massachusetts Location within the United States
- Location: 570 Pleasant St., Worcester, Massachusetts
- Coordinates: 42°15′53″N 71°49′21″W
- Area: less than one acre
- Built: c. 1912
- Architectural style: Queen Anne, Eclectic Queen Anne
- MPS: Worcester Three-Deckers TR
- NRHP reference No.: 89002427
- Added to NRHP: February 9, 1990

The Helen Dodge Three-Decker is an historic three-decker house at 570 Pleasant Street in Worcester, Massachusetts. Built in 1912, the well preserved, architecturally eclectic building is representative of the final stages of three-decker development, and its penetration into the fashionable upper-class west side of the city. The building was listed on the National Register of Historic Places in 1990.

== Description and history ==
The Helen Dodge Three-Decker is located in a residential setting west of downtown Worcester, on the south side of Pleasant Street opposite the city's Newton Hill Park. It is a three-story wood-frame structure, with a gable-on-hip roof and a mostly clapboarded exterior. Prominent features of its front facade include an angled projecting rectangular bay on the left side, and a stack of three porches on the right. The porch is distinctive for its semi-circular arch openings, and there are bands of decoratively cut shingles between the floors.

The house was built about 1912, and was one of a number of more architecturally sophisticated three-deckers built on the city's fashionable west side, its middle-class working residents gaining access to the downtown via a streetcar line that ran down Pleasant Street. Its early residents included clerks and telephone operators.

== See also ==
- National Register of Historic Places listings in northwestern Worcester, Massachusetts
- National Register of Historic Places listings in Worcester County, Massachusetts
