= Dodge Mansion =

Dodge Mansion may refer to:

- Dodge Mansion (Grosse Point Farms, Michigan), listed on the National Register of Historic Places in Wayne County, Michigan
- Dodge Mansion (Lansing, Michigan), listed on the National Register of Historic Places in Ingham County, Michigan

== See also ==
- Dodge House (disambiguation)
