= Edward Dodge House (Cambridge, Massachusetts) =

Historic house in Massachusetts, United States

- U.S. National Register of Historic Places
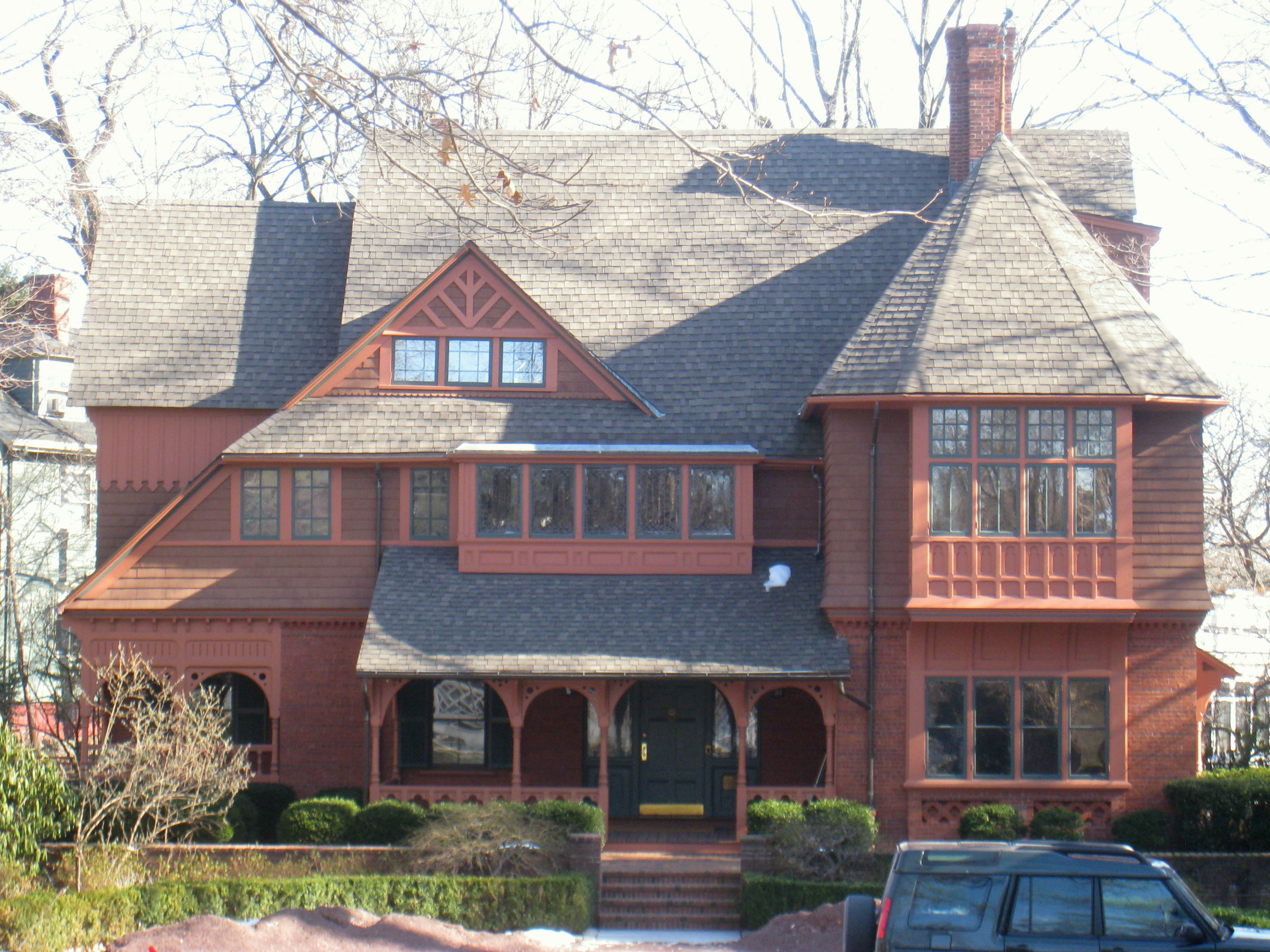
- View of the façade of the Edward Dodge House.

- Location within Massachusetts Location within the United States
- Location: Cambridge, Massachusetts
- Coordinates: 42°22′47″N 71°7′53″W
- Area: 2 acres (0.81 ha)
- Built: 1878
- Architect: Longfellow & Clark
- Architectural style: Queen Anne
- MPS: Cambridge MRA
- NRHP reference No.: 82001937
- Added to NRHP: April 13, 1982

The Edward Dodge House is a historic house at 70 Sparks Street in Cambridge, Massachusetts. The 2 1/2-story wood-frame house was built in 1878 to a design by Longfellow and Clark. It has asymmetrical massing typical of Queen Anne styling, and also has a style of half-timbering on its upper levels that was popular in England in the 1860s. The exterior surfaces have a variety of textures, create by different sheathing types, including vertical boards, wood paneling, and brick patternwork.

The house was listed on the National Register of Historic Places in 1982.

== See also ==
- National Register of Historic Places listings in Cambridge, Massachusetts
