= USS Abalone =

US patrol boat

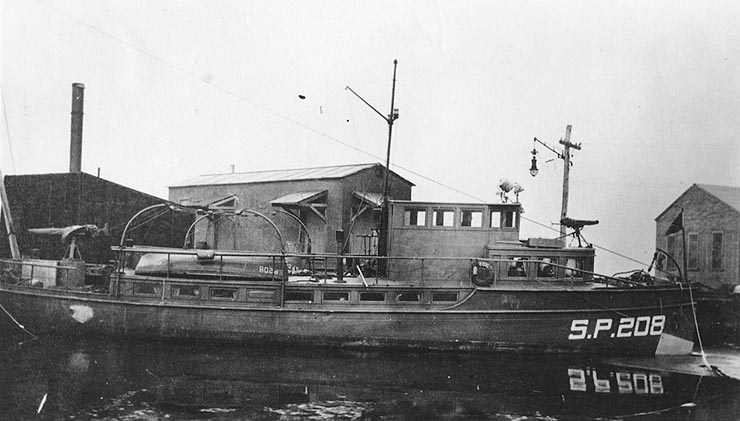
- USS Abalone (SP-208)

History

United States
- Name: USS Abalone
- Launched: 1913
- Acquired: by lease, 27 April 1917
- Commissioned: 10 May 1917
- Decommissioned: By 24 December 1918
- Fate: Returned to owner

General characteristics
- Type: Patrol boat
- Displacement: 33 long tons (34 t)
- Length: 60 ft (18 m)
- Beam: 12 ft 6 in (3.81 m)
- Draft: 3 ft 6 in (1.07 m)
- Speed: 10 knots (19 km/h; 12 mph)
- Complement: 8
- Armament: 1 × 1-pounder (450 g) gun; 1 × .30 cal. (7.62 mm) machine gun

USS Abalone (SP-208) was a wooden-hulled motorboat that was commissioned in the United States Navy as a section patrol craft during World War I. She was named after the abalone mollusk.

Built at Morris Heights in 1913, Abalone was acquired by the Navy on 27 April 1917 under a free lease from Arnold Schlaet of New York City and commissioned on 10 May 1917.

The sparse direct records of Abalone's day-to-day operations consist merely of a deck log, which does not even cover the craft's entire career. Other sources indicate that Abalone was attached to the 3rd Naval District local patrol forces and was based at New Haven, Connecticut. From that port, she performed patrol missions with Squadrons 5 and 20. Following the signing of the armistice, she was detached from this duty on 10 December 1918 and was returned to her previous owner a fortnight later, on 24 December 1918.
