= John Wood Dodge =

American painter

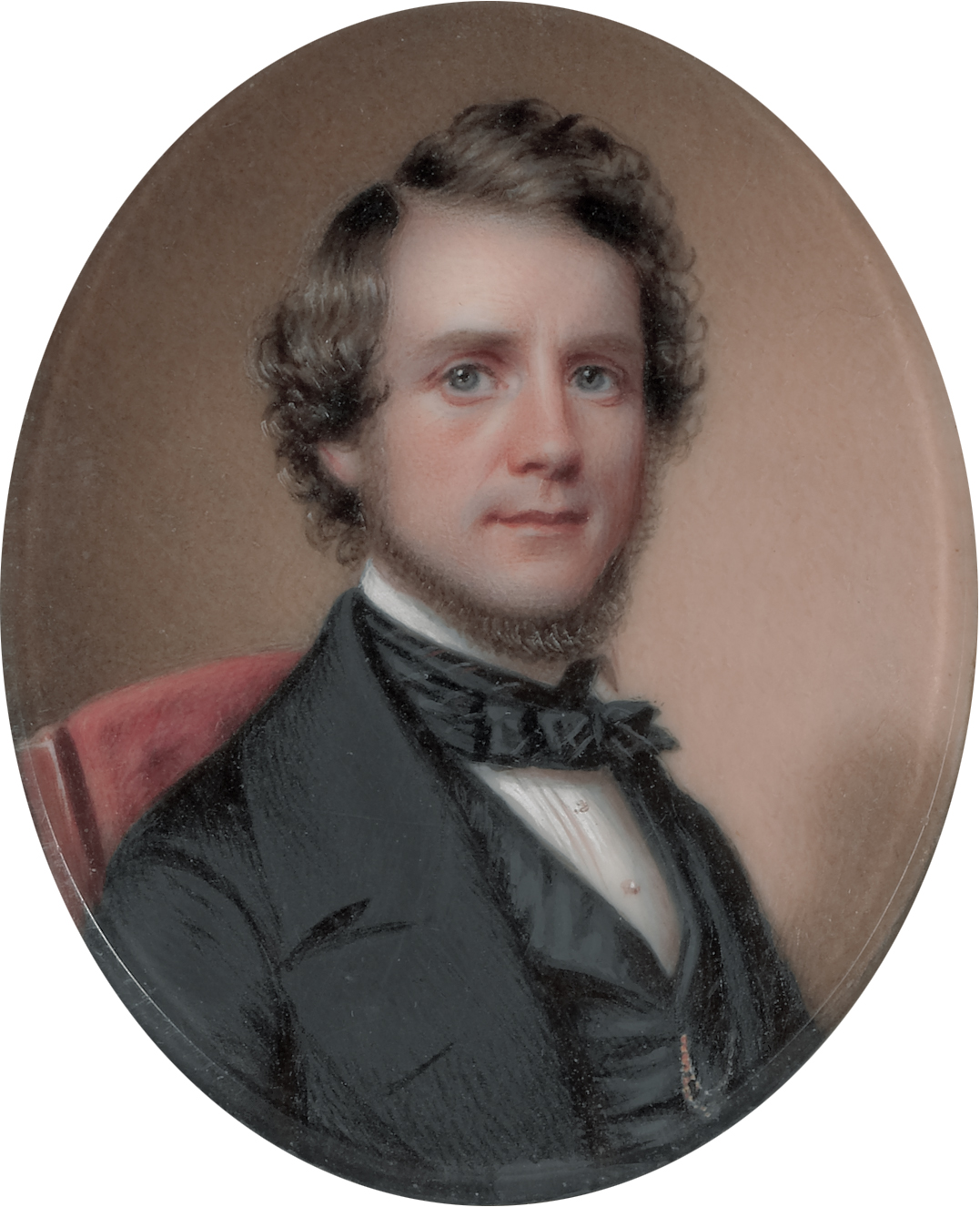
- John Wood Dodge
- Born: November 4, 1807; New York, New York
- Died: December 7, 1893 (aged 86); Pomona, Tennessee
- Occupation: Painter

John Wood Dodge (1807–1893) was an American painter. He is best known for his portrait miniatures of Southerners.

== Early life ==
John Wood Dodge was born on November 4, 1807, in New York City. His parents and grandparents were all from New York state, and the family home was near Poughkeepsie, New York. At the age of sixteen, he was apprenticed to a sign painter, where he painted tinned can of food. He then taught himself how to paint by copying borrowed paintings. He then practised drawings at the National Academy Museum and School in New York City from 1826 to 1827.

== Career ==
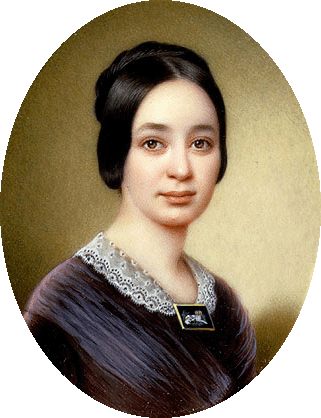
Varina Howell Davis by John Wood Dodge, 1849; National Portrait Gallery, Washington, D.C.

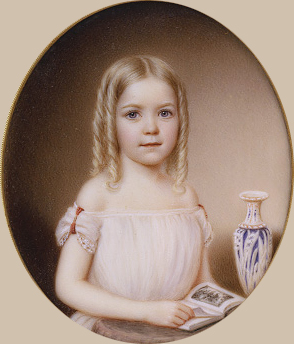
Kate Roselie Dodge by John Wood Dodge, 1854; Metropolitan Museum of Art, New York City

Dodge focused on painting miniatures on ivory. From 1830 to 1838, his work was exhibited at the National Academy Museum and School in New York City. He was also elected an associated of this academy in 1832.

Dodge moved to Alabama in 1838, finally settling down in Nashville, Tennessee, where he lived and worked for twenty-one years. In 1840, he published an article entitled 'Painting and Daguerreotype' in which he criticized the invention of the photography, as it made miniature paintings less popular. Still, in 1842, he did a portrait of Andrew Jackson (1767–1845), whose reproduction as a miniature was widely popular nationally. In 1849, he did a portrait of Varina Howell Davis (1826–1906), the second wife of Confederate President Jefferson Davis (1808–1889). However, by the 1850s, he began to take pictures.

In 1861, Dodge left Tennessee and returned to New York City, as he supported the Union. In 1865, his new portrait of Andrew Jackson was widely popular again, and widely reproduced. From 1870 to 1888, he moved to Chicago, where he served as Vice President of the (now-defunct) Chicago Academy of Design from 1874 to 1875. In 1888, he returned to his farm in Tennessee, where he continued to paint until 1893.

Some of his paintings are exhibited at the Metropolitan Museum of Art in New York City and the National Portrait Gallery in Washington, D.C., as well as the Cheekwood Botanical Garden and Museum of Art in Nashville, Tennessee.

In 1845, Dodge purchased land in the Cumberland Mountains near Nashville, which he developed into a homestead together with a log house and an apple orchard.

== Death ==
Dodge died on December 7, 1893, in Pomona, Tennessee.

== Selected paintings ==
- James O. Owens (Metropolitan Museum of Art, New York City, 1832).
- Portrait of a Gentleman (Metropolitan Museum of Art, New York City, 1833).
- Reverend William Lupton Johnson (Metropolitan Museum of Art, New York City, 1834).
- Portrait of a Lady (Metropolitan Museum of Art, New York City, 1835).
- Edward S. Dodge (Metropolitan Museum of Art, New York City, 1835).
- George Catlin (Metropolitan Museum of Art, New York City, 1835).
- Mrs. John Wood Dodge (Mary Louise Dodge) (Metropolitan Museum of Art, New York City, 1836).
- A. L. Clements (Metropolitan Museum of Art, New York City, 1838).
- Mrs. A. L. Clements (Mary Louisa Wells) (Metropolitan Museum of Art, New York City, 1838).
- Portrait of a Gentleman (Metropolitan Museum of Art, New York City, 1841).
- Varina Howell Davis (National Portrait Gallery, Washington, D.C.; 1849).
- Mrs. George P. Burne (Metropolitan Museum of Art, New York City, 1852).
- Kate Rosalie Dodge (Metropolitan Museum of Art, New York City, 1854).
- Mrs. Annie C. Hyde (Metropolitan Museum of Art, New York City, 1863).
