= Edward Dodge House (Port Washington, Wisconsin) =

Historic house in Wisconsin, United States

- U.S. National Register of Historic Places
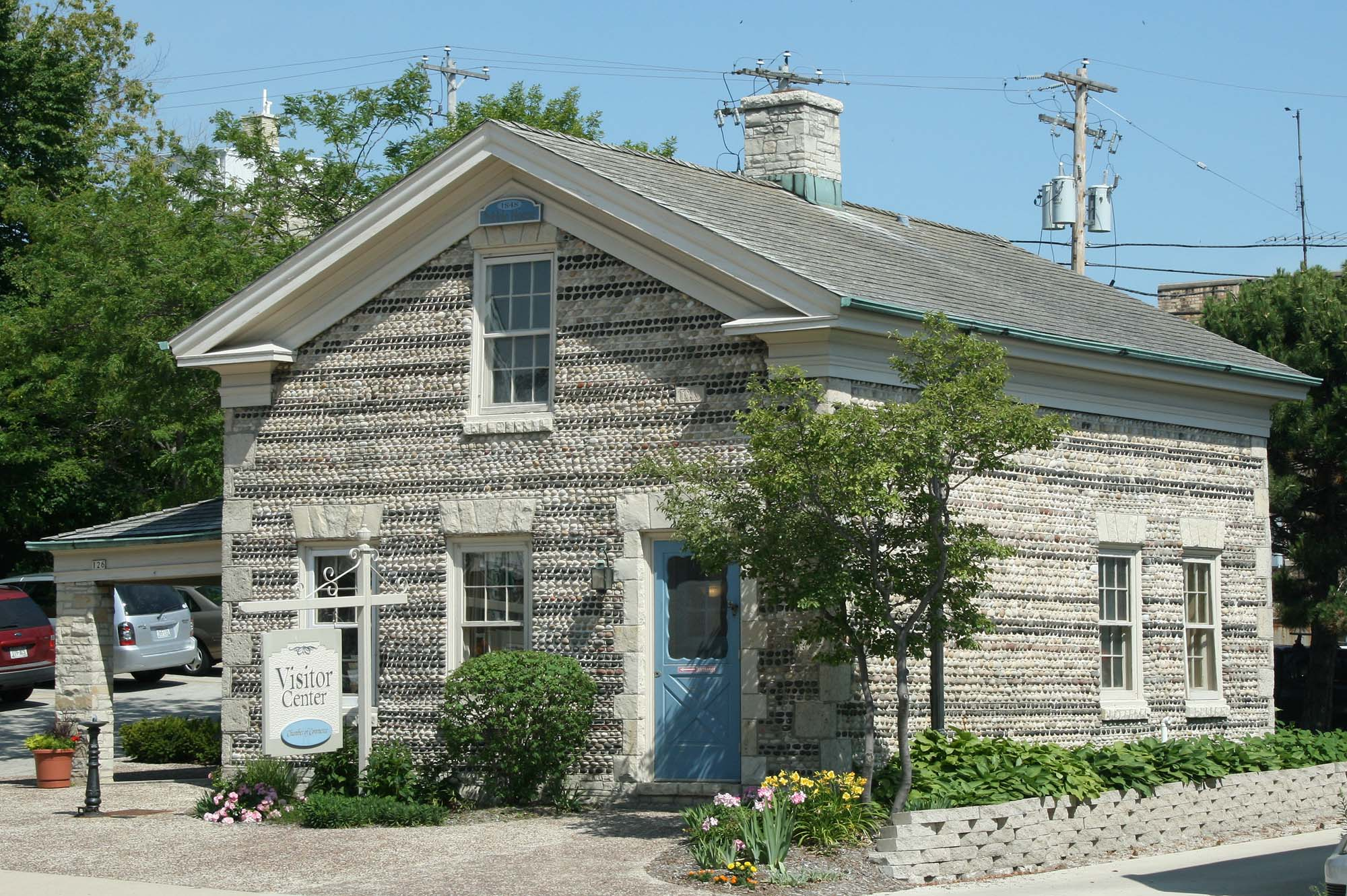
- Edward Dodge House

- Location within Wisconsin
- Location: 126 E. Grand Ave. Port Washington, Wisconsin
- Coordinates: 43.38779°N 87.8698°W
- Area: less than one acre
- Built: 1848
- Architect: Edward Dodge
- Architectural style: Greek Revival
- NRHP reference No.: 75000074
- Added to NRHP: July 24, 1975

The Edward Dodge House is a historic house located at 126 East Grand Avenue in Port Washington, Wisconsin.

== Description and history ==
The two-story house was built by Edward Dodge in 1848, in the Greek Revival style with walls of rubble-stone faced with cobblestone arranged in colored bands, and also a pitched roof typical for houses built in that particular style. Currently, it serves as the Visitor Center for the city of Port Washington.

It was added to the National Register of Historic Places on July 24, 1975.
