= Brooklyn Dodgers (basketball) =

The Brooklyn Dodgers were an American basketball team based in Brooklyn, New York that was a member of the Eastern Basketball Association.

== History ==
=== Background ===
The Brooklyn Dodgers baseball team played its last game at Ebbets Field on September 24, 1957, before moving to Los Angeles. The stadium was demolished in February 1960 to make way for apartment buildings.

The "Brooklyn Dodgers" name is primarily linked to the baseball team, but it has also been used by teams in other sports. The Brooklyn Dodgers were an NFL team from 1930 to 1943. After Ebbets Field was demolished, a minor league football team named the Brooklyn Dodgers was established in 1966, with Jackie Robinson as general manager.

One of the final teams to use the "Dodgers" name was the minor league Brooklyn Dodgers basketball team in 1977-1978. This team played in the Eastern Basketball Association (EBA), a league that had been around for 30 years, primarily holding weekend games in Pennsylvania, with occasional games in New York, New Jersey, New England, and Delaware.

=== Ownership and Operations ===
Al Verssen, a high school math teacher and print shop owner from Greenpoint, owned the Brooklyn Dodgers basketball team. Verssen's operation was small-scale, with him often working the door at Brooklyn College’s Roosevelt Hall gymnasium, where the team played most of its home games on Sunday evenings. The team had low attendance, usually attracting a few hundred fans per game, many of whom were admitted for free.

=== In Competition ===
The Dodgers had a difficult season, finishing second to last in the 10-team EBA with an 8-22 record. Despite their struggles, they had the league's top two scorers. Jacky Dorsey, a former University of Georgia player who averaged 32.8 points per game, was a 2nd round draft pick of the New Orleans Jazz in 1976. And Jeff Bezon. Dorsey played 17 games with the Dodgers and appeared in several NBA games with Denver and Portland during the 1977-78 season. He later played for the Houston Rockets and Seattle SuperSonics between 1978 and 1981.

Guard Glen Williams, a rookie from St. John’s, was the second-highest scorer in the league with an average of 31.8 points per game. Williams was a 2nd round draft pick of the Milwaukee Bucks in 1977 but never played in the NBA.

=== Demise ===
After the season, the EBA rebranded as the Continental Basketball Association (CBA) and aimed for nationwide expansion. This began a year earlier when the Anchorage Northern Knights joined the EBA and agreed to cover the travel costs for Eastern teams to make one trip per season to Alaska. The Brooklyn Dodgers played a two-game series in Anchorage on January 7-8, 1978, losing both games.

Due to the increased financial demands and the league's expansion plans, the Brooklyn Dodgers basketball team ceased operations in 1978.

== Year-by-year ==
Year	League	Reg. season	Playoffs
1977/78	EBA	5th, Eastern	Did not qualify
