= John Dodge (editor) =

American journalist

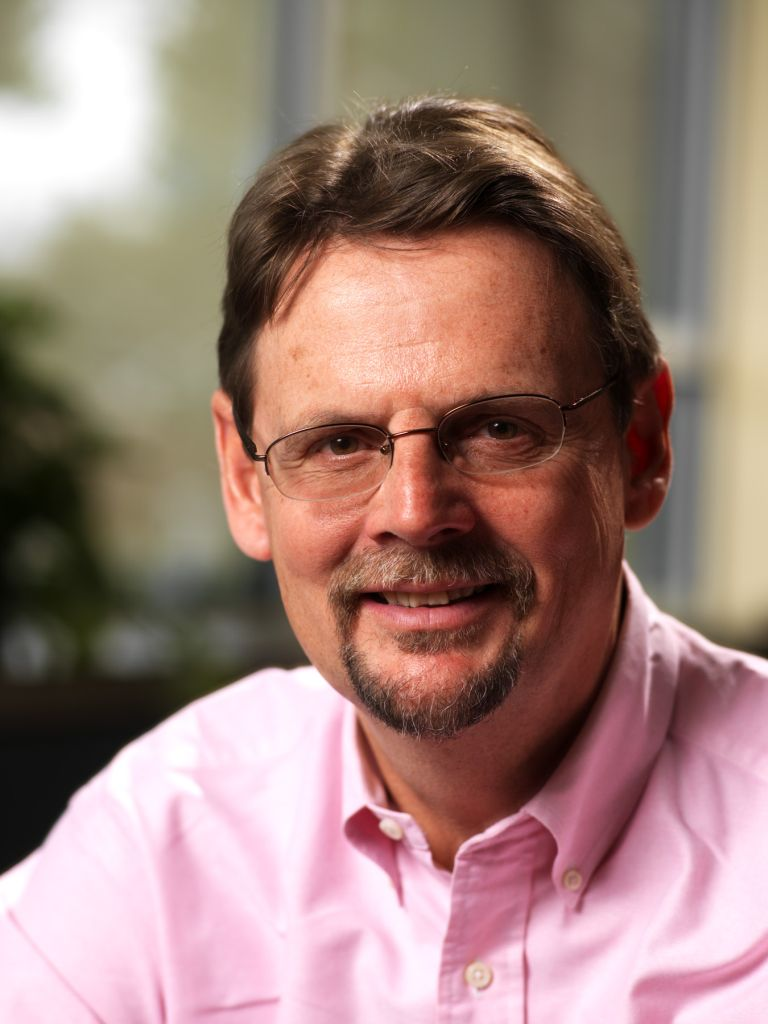
John Dodge

John M. Dodge is an American journalist. He worked for nearly 20 years in top editorial and management positions at Ziff Davis. He was editor and executive editor/news at eWeek and vice president of news for Ziff Davis, where he coordinated all of the technology news across the company's websites. Dodge worked at ZD from 1983 to 2002 except for two and a half years at CMP, another high tech publishing company.

Dodge was also a weekly e-business columnist for the Wall Street Journal online, author of a bi-weekly technology column for the Boston Globe, and a contributor to a technology column for the Atlanta Journal-Constitution. He has appeared on CBS News, CNN, Bloomberg News, ABC World News Tonight and other major broadcast outlets around the country.

Until January 2009, he was editor-in-chief of engineering publication Design News, a position he held for two years. He retired in from IDG in July 2015 and still writes for his favorite newspaper, The Boston Globe. He also blogs occasionally at The Dodge Retort.

From January 2002 to September 2004, he served in top editorial roles at Bio-ITWorld.
