= USS Dodger II =

Patrol vessel of the United States Navy

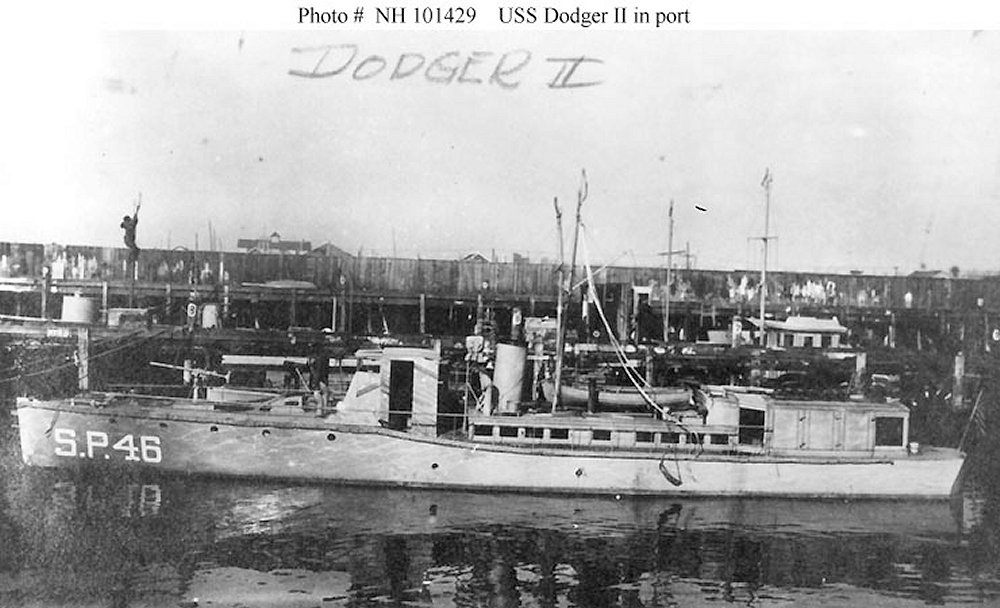
- USS Dodger II on 26 December 1917.

History

United States
- Name: USS Dodger II
- Namesake: Previous name retained
- Builder: Gas Engine and Power Company, Morris Heights, New York
- Completed: 1913
- Acquired: 25 May 1917
- Commissioned: 6 July 1917
- Stricken: 11 March 1919
- Fate: Sold 30 April 1919
- Notes: In private use as motorboat Dodger II 1913–1917

General characteristics
- Type: Patrol vessel
- Length: 76 ft 2 in (23.22 m)

USS Dodger II (SP-46) was an armed motorboat that served as a United States Navy patrol vessel from 1917 to 1919.

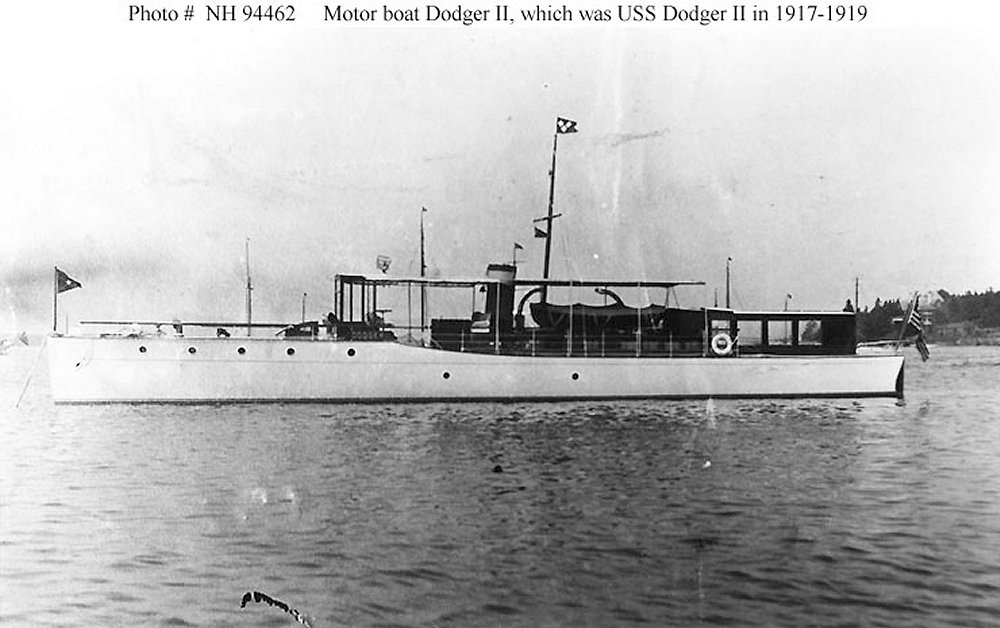
Dodger II in private use prior to her U.S. Navy service.

Dodger II was built in 1913 as a private motorboat of the same name by the Gas Engine and Power Company at Morris Heights, New York. The U.S. Navy acquired her for World War I service from her owner, Harold I. Pratt of New York City, on 25 May 1917, and commissioned her as patrol boat USS Dodger II (SP-46) on 6 July 1917.

Dodger II was assigned to the 3rd Naval District, where she was assigned patrol duty. She spent her naval career patrolling the New York Harbor area.

Dodger II was stricken from the Navy Directory on 11 March 1919 and sold on 30 April 1919.
